= Märkischer Kreis II =

Federal electoral district of Germany

149 Märkischer Kreis II
- Electoral district for the Bundestag
- Märkischer Kreis II in 2025
- State: North Rhine-Westphalia
- Population: 268,100 (2019)
- Electorate: 195,816 (2021)
- Major settlements: Iserlohn; Menden; Hemer
- Area: 611.7 km^{2}

Current electoral district
- Created: 1980
- Party: CDU
- Member: Paul Ziemiak
- Elected: 2021, 2025

Märkischer Kreis II is an electoral constituency (German: Wahlkreis) represented in the Bundestag. It elects one member via first-past-the-post voting. Under the current constituency numbering system, it is designated as constituency 149. It is located in southern North Rhine-Westphalia, comprising the northern part of the Märkischer Kreis district.

Märkischer Kreis II was created for the 1980 federal election. Since 2002, it has been represented by Paul Ziemiak of the Christian Democratic Union (CDU).

== Geography ==
Märkischer Kreis II is located in southern North Rhine-Westphalia. As of the 2021 federal election, it comprises the entirety of the Märkischer Kreis district excluding the municipalities of Halver, Herscheid, Kierspe, Lüdenscheid, Meinerzhagen, and Schalksmühle.

== History ==
Märkischer Kreis II was created in 1980. In the 1980 through 1998 elections, it was constituency 123 in the numbering system. From 2002 through 2009, it was number 151. In the 2013 through 2021 elections, it was number 150. From the 2025 election, it has been number 149.

Originally, the constituency comprised the municipalities of Lüdenscheid, Altena, Meinerzhagen, Kierspe, Plettenberg, Werdohl, Halver, Herscheid, and Schalksmühle from the Märkischer Kreis district. It acquired its current borders in the 2002 election.

Election	No.	Name	Borders
1980	123	Märkischer Kreis II	Märkischer Kreis district (only Lüdenscheid, Altena, Meinerzhagen, Kierspe, Plettenberg, Werdohl, Halver, Herscheid, and Schalksmühle municipalities)
1983	123	Märkischer Kreis II	Märkischer Kreis district (only Lüdenscheid, Altena, Meinerzhagen, Kierspe, Plettenberg, Werdohl, Halver, Herscheid, and Schalksmühle municipalities)
1987	123	Märkischer Kreis II	Märkischer Kreis district (only Lüdenscheid, Altena, Meinerzhagen, Kierspe, Plettenberg, Werdohl, Halver, Herscheid, and Schalksmühle municipalities)
1990	123	Märkischer Kreis II	Märkischer Kreis district (only Lüdenscheid, Altena, Meinerzhagen, Kierspe, Plettenberg, Werdohl, Halver, Herscheid, and Schalksmühle municipalities)
1994	123	Märkischer Kreis II	Märkischer Kreis district (only Lüdenscheid, Altena, Meinerzhagen, Kierspe, Plettenberg, Werdohl, Halver, Herscheid, and Schalksmühle municipalities)
1998	123	Märkischer Kreis II	Märkischer Kreis district (only Lüdenscheid, Altena, Meinerzhagen, Kierspe, Plettenberg, Werdohl, Halver, Herscheid, and Schalksmühle municipalities)
2002	151	Märkischer Kreis II	Märkischer Kreis district (excluding Halver, Herscheid, Kierspe, Lüdenscheid, Meinerzhagen, and Schalksmühle municipalities)
2005	151	Märkischer Kreis II	Märkischer Kreis district (excluding Halver, Herscheid, Kierspe, Lüdenscheid, Meinerzhagen, and Schalksmühle municipalities)
2009	151	Märkischer Kreis II	Märkischer Kreis district (excluding Halver, Herscheid, Kierspe, Lüdenscheid, Meinerzhagen, and Schalksmühle municipalities)
2013	150	Märkischer Kreis II	Märkischer Kreis district (excluding Halver, Herscheid, Kierspe, Lüdenscheid, Meinerzhagen, and Schalksmühle municipalities)
2017	150	Märkischer Kreis II	Märkischer Kreis district (excluding Halver, Herscheid, Kierspe, Lüdenscheid, Meinerzhagen, and Schalksmühle municipalities)
2021	150	Märkischer Kreis II	Märkischer Kreis district (excluding Halver, Herscheid, Kierspe, Lüdenscheid, Meinerzhagen, and Schalksmühle municipalities)
2025	149	Märkischer Kreis II	Märkischer Kreis district (excluding Halver, Herscheid, Kierspe, Lüdenscheid, Meinerzhagen, and Schalksmühle municipalities)

== Members ==
The constituency has been held by the Social Democratic Party (SPD) during all but two Bundestag terms since its creation. It was first represented by Günter Topmann from 1980 to 1983. Wolfgang Lohmann of the Christian Democratic Union (CDU) won it in 1983 and served a single term. Lisa Seuster regained it for the SPD in 1987, and served until 1998. Dieter Dzewas was then representative from 1998 to 2002. Dagmar Freitag was elected in 2002 and served until 2021. Paul Ziemiak won the constituency for the CDU in 2021 and was re-elected in 2025.

Election	Member	Party	%
1980	Günter Topmann	SPD	51.0
1983	Wolfgang Lohmann	CDU	47.0
1987	Lisa Seuster	SPD	47.3
1990	Lisa Seuster	SPD	45.2
1994	Lisa Seuster	SPD	48.8
1998	Dieter Dzewas	SPD	52.0
2002	Dagmar Freitag	SPD	49.7
2005	Dagmar Freitag	SPD	47.5
2009	Dagmar Freitag	SPD	41.0
2013	Dagmar Freitag	SPD	41.7
2017	Dagmar Freitag	SPD	38.6
2021	Paul Ziemiak	CDU	33.6
2025	Paul Ziemiak	CDU	38.8

== Election results ==
=== 2025 election ===
Federal election (2025): Märkischer Kreis II
Notes:	Blue background denotes the winner of the electorate vote. Pink background denotes a candidate elected from their party list. Yellow background denotes an electorate win by a list member, or other incumbent. A ✓ or ✗ denotes status of any incumbent, win or lose respectively.						
Party	Candidate	Votes	%	±%	Party votes	%	±%
CDU	✓ Paul Ziemiak	58,968	38.8	▲5.2	51,785	34.0	▲5.7
SPD	Bettina Lugk	34,522	22.7	▼7.7	27,788	18.3	▼11.3
AfD	Wolfgang Grudda	31,657	20.9	▲11.8	32,474	21.3	▲12.2
Left	Jana Finke	9,917	6.5	▲3.3	10,286	6.8	▲3.4
Greens	Marjan Eggers	8,878	6.5	▼2.5	11,435	7.5	▼2.9
BSW					6,553	4.3	
FDP	Lydia Timmer	4,577	3.0	▼5.9	6,027	4.0	▼8.0
Tierschutzpartei				▼3.1	2,350	1.5	▼0.6
BD	Christof Trippe	1,317	0.9		382	0.3	
Independent	Franz-Josef Schulte	961	0.6				
PARTEI					701	0.5	▼0.5
FW				▼1.4	649	0.4	▼0.4
Volt					546	0.4	
dieBasis				▼1.1	418	0.3	▼0.8
Team Todenhöfer					328	0.2	▼0.4
PdF					229	0.2	▲0.1
Values					103	0.1	▼0.1
MERA25					55	0.0	
MLPD					37	0.0	0.0
Pirates							▼0.4
Gesundheitsforschung							▼0.2
Humanists							▼0.1
Bündnis C							▼0.1
ÖDP							▼0.1
SGP						0.0	0.0
Informal votes		1,324			975		
Total valid votes		151,797			152,146		
Turnout		153,121	80.1	▲6.7			
CDU hold	Majority	24,446	16.1				

=== 2021 election ===
Federal election (2021): Märkischer Kreis II
Notes:	Blue background denotes the winner of the electorate vote. Pink background denotes a candidate elected from their party list. Yellow background denotes an electorate win by a list member, or other incumbent. A ✓ or ✗ denotes status of any incumbent, win or lose respectively.						
Party	Candidate	Votes	%	±%	Party votes	%	±%
CDU	Paul Ziemiak	47,937	33.6	▼4.2	40,368	28.3	▼5.7
SPD	Bettina Lugk	43,346	30.4	▼8.2	42,230	29.6	▲3.8
AfD	Daniel Bläsing	12,933	9.1		13,082	9.2	▼2.4
Greens	Ingo Stuckmann	12,866	9.0	▲5.3	14,880	10.4	▲5.5
FDP	Jochen Lipproß	12,749	8.9	▼1.8	17,125	12.0	▼1.4
Left	Michael Thomas-Lienkämper	4,668	3.3	▼4.5	4,804	3.4	▼3.2
Tierschutzpartei	Michael Siethoff	4,382	3.1		2,994	2.1	▲1.2
FW	Hans Herbers	2,004	1.4		1,228	0.9	▲0.6
dieBasis	Stefan Radtke	1,575	1.1		1,496	1.0	
PARTEI					1,300	0.9	▲0.3
Team Todenhöfer					925	0.5	
Pirates					540	0.4	0.0
Gesundheitsforschung					245	0.2	0.0
LIEBE					222	0.2	
Volt					215	0.2	
NPD					185	0.1	▼0.1
LfK					154	0.1	
Humanists					111	0.1	0.0
Bündnis C					105	0.1	
ÖDP					85	0.1	0.0
V-Partei3					75	0.1	0.0
du.					68	0.0	
MLPD					52	0.0	0.0
PdF					46	0.0	
DKP					32	0.0	0.0
LKR					28	0.0	
SGP					13	0.0	0.0
Informal votes		1,229			1,081		
Total valid votes		142,460			142,608		
Turnout		143,689	73.4	▲0.8			
CDU gain from SPD	Majority	4,591	3.2				

=== 2017 election ===
Federal election (2017): Märkischer Kreis II
Notes:	Blue background denotes the winner of the electorate vote. Pink background denotes a candidate elected from their party list. Yellow background denotes an electorate win by a list member, or other incumbent. A ✓ or ✗ denotes status of any incumbent, win or lose respectively.						
Party	Candidate	Votes	%	±%	Party votes	%	±%
SPD	✓ Dagmar Freitag	54,890	38.6	▼3.1	37,193	25.8	▼6.5
CDU	Christel Voßbeck-Kayser	53,714	37.8	▼3.8	49,061	34.0	▼7.5
FDP	Michael Schulte	15,221	10.7	▲8.8	19,328	13.4	▲8.9
AfD					16,688	11.6	▲6.6
Left	Christian Kißler	11,113	7.8	▲3.0	9,427	6.5	▲0.6
Greens	John Haberle	5,356	3.8	▲0.6	7,060	4.9	▼0.7
Independent	Konrad Maier	1,799	1.3				
Tierschutzpartei					1,262	0.9	
PARTEI					931	0.6	▲0.2
AD-DEMOKRATEN					729	0.5	
Pirates					604	0.4	▼1.9
FW					421	0.3	0.0
NPD					352	0.2	▼0.9
Gesundheitsforschung					189	0.1	
Volksabstimmung					187	0.1	▼0.1
DiB					138	0.1	
ÖDP					134	0.1	0.0
DM					133	0.1	
BGE					130	0.1	
V-Partei³					111	0.1	
Die Humanisten					59	0.0	
MLPD					56	0.0	0.0
DKP					15	0.0	
SGP					14	0.0	0.0
Informal votes		3,381			1,252		
Total valid votes		142,093			144,222		
Turnout		145,474	72.5	▲2.1			
SPD hold	Majority	1,176	0.8	▲0.7			

=== 2013 election ===
Federal election (2013): Märkischer Kreis II
Notes:	Blue background denotes the winner of the electorate vote. Pink background denotes a candidate elected from their party list. Yellow background denotes an electorate win by a list member, or other incumbent. A ✓ or ✗ denotes status of any incumbent, win or lose respectively.						
Party	Candidate	Votes	%	±%	Party votes	%	±%
SPD	✓ Dagmar Freitag	59,821	41.7	▲0.7	46,318	32.3	▲3.5
CDU	Christel Voßbeck-Kayser	59,768	41.6	▲5.3	59,536	41.5	▲6.0
Left	Manuel Huff	6,926	4.8	▼2.4	8,463	5.9	▼2.7
AfD		4,709	3.3		7,122	5.0	
Greens	Elke Olbrich-Tripp	4,498	3.1	▼1.1	7,971	5.6	▼1.7
Pirates	Hans-Joachim Ossenberg	3,114	2.2		3,284	2.3	▲0.8
FDP	Michael Schulte	2,792	1.9	▼6.1	6,431	4.5	▼9.7
NPD		1,874	1.3	▼0.3	1,620	1.1	▼0.2
PARTEI					625	0.4	
FW					389	0.3	
Volksabstimmung					363	0.3	▲0.1
PRO					317	0.2	
REP					284	0.2	▼0.2
Nichtwahler					194	0.1	
BIG					147	0.1	
ÖDP					145	0.1	0.0
RRP					119	0.1	▼0.1
Party of Reason					109	0.1	
MLPD					47	0.0	0.0
PSG					31	0.0	0.0
Die Rechte					27	0.0	
BüSo					18	0.0	0.0
Informal votes		1,695			1,637		
Total valid votes		143,502			143,560		
Turnout		145,197	70.4	▲0.8			
SPD hold	Majority	53	0.1	▼4.6			

=== 2009 election ===
Federal election (2009): Märkischer Kreis II
Notes:	Blue background denotes the winner of the electorate vote. Pink background denotes a candidate elected from their party list. Yellow background denotes an electorate win by a list member, or other incumbent. A ✓ or ✗ denotes status of any incumbent, win or lose respectively.						
Party	Candidate	Votes	%	±%	Party votes	%	±%
SPD	✓ Dagmar Freitag	59,521	41.0	▼6.5	41,755	28.7	▼11.1
CDU	Christel Voßbeck-Kayser	52,751	36.3	▼4.7	51,494	35.4	▼1.3
FDP	Rainer Eckehard Krause	11,740	8.1	▲4.3	20,616	14.2	▲4.7
Left	Karsten Renfordt	10,431	7.2	▲3.1	12,450	8.6	▲3.4
Greens	Elke Olbrich-Tripp	6,207	4.3	▲2.2	10,589	7.3	▲2.1
Pirates					2,181	1.5	
NPD	Timo Pradel	2,331	1.6	▲0.1	1,902	1.3	▲0.1
Tierschutzpartei	Michael Siethoff	2,217	1.5		1,310	0.9	▲0.3
FAMILIE					810	0.6	▲0.1
RENTNER					786	0.5	
REP					555	0.4	▼0.2
RRP					335	0.2	
Volksabstimmung					169	0.1	0.0
DVU					105	0.1	
ÖDP					105	0.1	
Centre					67	0.0	0.0
MLPD					48	0.0	0.0
BüSo					25	0.0	0.0
PSG					23	0.0	0.0
Informal votes		1,788			1,661		
Total valid votes		145,198			145,325		
Turnout		146,986	69.7	▼6.8			
SPD hold	Majority	6,770	4.7	▼1.8			

=== 2005 election ===
Federal election (2005): Märkischer Kreis II
Notes:	Blue background denotes the winner of the electorate vote. Pink background denotes a candidate elected from their party list. Yellow background denotes an electorate win by a list member, or other incumbent. A ✓ or ✗ denotes status of any incumbent, win or lose respectively.						
Party	Candidate	Votes	%	±%	Party votes	%	±%
SPD	✓ Dagmar Freitag	76,312	47.5	▼2.2	64,123	39.8	▼3.3
CDU	Thomas Gemke	66,020	41.1	▲2.4	59,238	36.8	▼0.2
Left	Karsten Renfordt	6,617	4.1	▲3.3	8,360	5.2	▲4.3
FDP	Jochen Lipproß	6,038	3.8	▼2.1	15,321	9.5	▲0.2
Greens	Barbel Keiderling	3,387	2.1	▼0.7	8,370	5.2	▼0.48
NPD	Timo Pradel	2,357	1.5	▲0.7	1,879	1.2	▲0.7
Tierschutzpartei					898	0.6	▲0.2
REP					886	0.6	0.0
Familie					729	0.5	▲0.3
GRAUEN					469	0.3	▲0.1
PBC					339	0.2	
From Now on... Democracy Through Referendum					206	0.1	
Centre					73	0.0	
Socialist Equality Party					70	0.0	
BüSo					49	0.0	
MLPD					39	0.0	0.0
Informal votes		2,403			2,085		
Total valid votes		160,731			161,049		
Turnout		161,134	76.5	▼2.4			
SPD hold	Majority	10,292	6.4				
