= Paul Ziemiak =

German politician

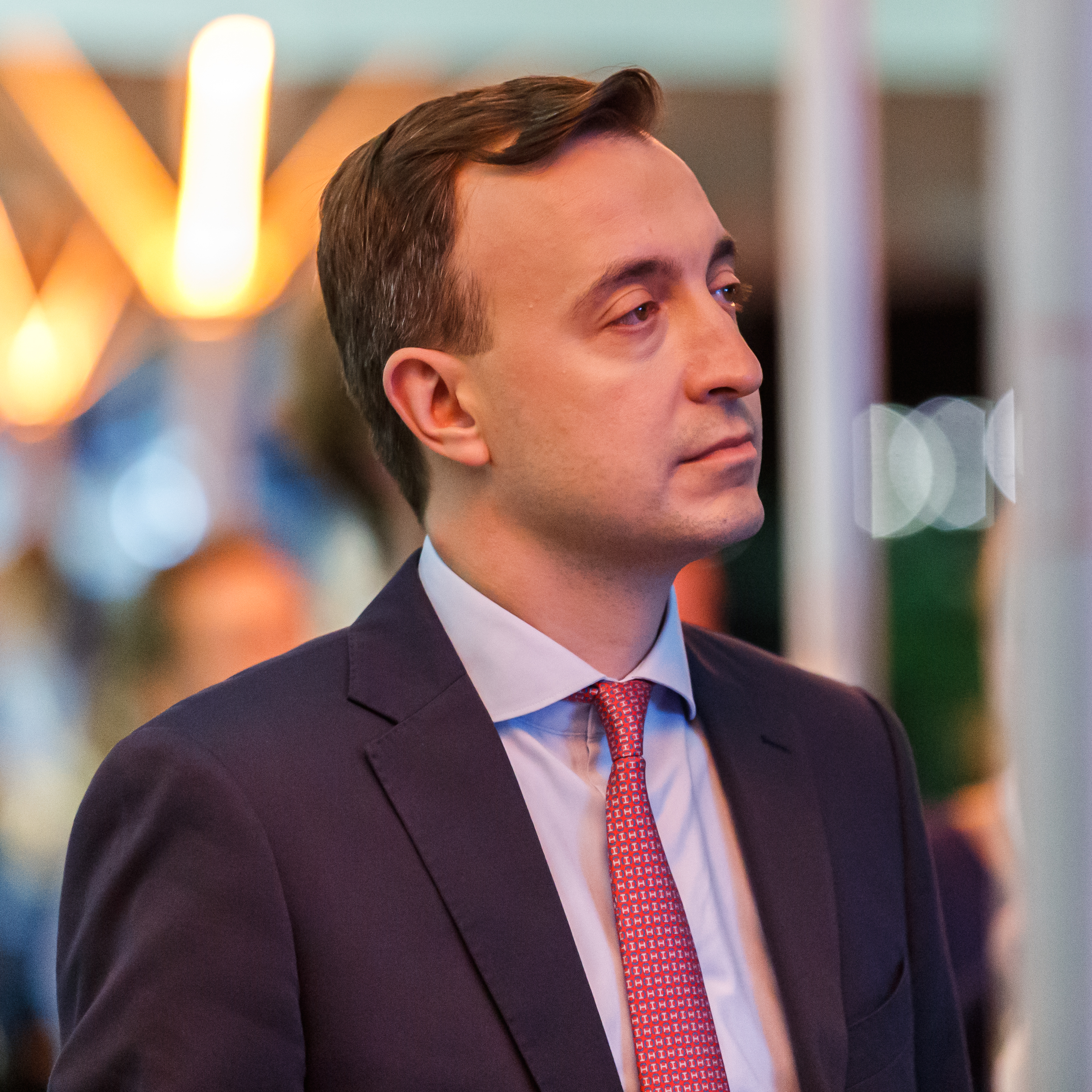

General Secretary of the Christian Democratic Union
- In office 8 December 2018 – 31 January 2022
- Leader: Annegret Kramp-Karrenbauer; Armin Laschet
- Preceded by: Annegret Kramp-Karrenbauer
- Succeeded by: Mario Czaja

Leader of the Young Union
- In office 20 September 2014 – 8 December 2018
- National Secretary: Conrad Clemens; Philipp Müller
- Preceded by: Philipp Mißfelder
- Succeeded by: Tilman Kuban

Member of the Bundestag for North Rhine-Westphalia
- Incumbent
- Assumed office 26 October 2021
- Preceded by: Christel Voßbeck-Kayser
- Constituency: Märkischer Kreis II
- In office 24 October 2017 – 26 October 2021
- Preceded by: Ingrid Fischbach
- Succeeded by: multi-member district
- Constituency: CDU List

Personal details
- Born: Paweł Ziemiak; 6 September 1985 (age 41) Szczecin, Polish People's Republic (now Poland)
- Citizenship: Polish; German (1988–)
- Party: Christian Democratic Union (2001–)
- Children: 2
- Education: Osnabrück University (no degree); University of Münster (no degree); University of Europe for Applied Sciences (no degree)
- Occupation: Politician; Consultant
- Website: Official website

Paul Ziemiak (born 6 September 1985 as Paweł Ziemiak) is a German politician of the Christian Democratic Union of Germany (CDU) who has been serving as a member of the German Bundestag since the 2017 federal election. In addition to his parliamentary work, he has been serving as the Secretary General of the CDU in North Rhine-Westphalia since 2022, under the leadership of chairman Hendrik Wüst.

Ziemiak previously was the party's General Secretary on the national level from 8 December 2018 to 31 January 2022, under the leadership of Annegret Kramp-Karrenbauer and Armin Laschet. From 2014 until 2018, he served as federal chairman of the Junge Union Deutschlands, in this capacity being a part of the CDU leadership under chairwoman Angela Merkel.

== Early life and career ==
Ziemiak was born in Szczecin, Polish People's Republic. He moved to then-West Germany in 1988 with his parents, who wanted to escape the conditions of Communist Poland and the Eastern Bloc. The Ziemiaks were among the around 140,000 Polish citizens who left for Germany in that year, shortly before the Fall of Communism. Claiming partial German descent, they obtained citizenship under Germany's right of return laws and lived for a year in a refugee camp in Massen next to non-western asylum seekers. Ziemiak has said the facility was often visited by the police and that he befriended a Roma family that also lived there. After a year they settled permanently in Iserlohn. Both his parents had been doctors in Poland, but their qualifications were not recognised in West Germany and they had to retrain as interns in German hospitals before obtaining their German licenses and finding employment. Ziemiak grew up bilingual, with parents who were native Polish speakers and who only spoke German as a foreign language. He has said the family was culturally Polish and that Germany only gradually felt like home.

After graduation Ziemiak studied law at the Universität Osnabrück and the Westfälische Wilhelms-Universität Münster but failed the first legal exam on both attempts. He then enrolled at the Business and Information Technology School in Iserlohn to study corporate communications.

Since 2005 Ziemiak has been a member of the Catholic fraternity AV Widukind Osnabrück within the CV. Furthermore, he is a member of the Catholic student fraternity KDStV Winfridia (Breslau) Münster.

== Political career ==
Ziemiak joined the Young Union in 1998, and in 2001 the CDU. From 1999 to 2001 he was the first chairman of the newly founded Children and Youth Parliament of the city of Iserlohn. In 2002 he became a member of the district council of the Junge Union in the Märkischer Kreis. In 2006 he was elected to the state board of the JU NRW. In 2007 he became a member of the executive state board. In 2009 he took over the leadership of the district association of the Junge Union Südwestfalen (South Westphalia). Since 2011 he has been serving as chairman of the CDU Iserlohn and member of the board of the CDU parliamentary group in the council of the city Iserlohn. In addition, he is a member of the district executive committee of the CDU Südwestfalen.

=== Chairman of the Young Union, 2012–2018 ===
On 25 November 2012 Ziemiak was elected state chairman of the Junge Union NRW and held this office until 15 November 2014. In 2014, he won the vote for the presidency of the Junge Union against Benedict Poettering and won with 63 percent of the vote. It was the first battle candidacy for this position since 1973. Ziemiak thus is a member of the CDU federal board and replaced Philipp Missfelder, who did not run again. On 14 October 2016, Ziemiak was again elected Federal Chairman with 85 percent of the vote.

In February 2017, Ziemiak was a member of the 16th Federal Assembly for the election of the Federal President.

In addition to his political career, Ziemiak worked with consultancy PricewaterhouseCoopers until entering parliament.

=== Member of Parliament, 2017–present ===
In the federal election 2017, Ziemiak ran as successor to Ingrid Fischbach in the constituency Herne – Bochum II, but lost to Michelle Müntefering. Nevertheless, he moved to the Bundestag via the state party list.

In parliament, Ziemiak served on the Committee on Foreign Affairs from 2018 to 2021 before moving to the Committee on Economic Cooperation and Development. In addition to his committee assignments, he is part of a cross-party group in support of Schützenverein culture.

In the negotiations to form a fourth coalition government under the leadership of Chancellor Angela Merkel following the 2017 federal elections, Ziemiak was part of the working group on families, women, seniors and youth, led by Annette Widmann-Mauz, Angelika Niebler and Katarina Barley.

=== Secretary General of the CDU, 2018–2022 ===
The new CDU party leader Annegret Kramp-Karrenbauer nominated Ziemiak on 8 December 2018 as secretary general. He was elected on the same day, with 63 percent of the delegates voting for him as the only candidate for the role. At the time of the vote, Ziemiak's nomination was widely interpreted as sign of Kramp-Karrenbauer' willingness to build bridges to the defeated conservatives around her opponents Friedrich Merz and Jens Spahn.

Amid the COVID-19 pandemic in Germany, Ziemiak co-chaired – alongside Silvia Breher, Tobias Hans, Hendrik Hoppenstedt and Yvonne Magwas – the CDU’s first ever digital national convention in 2021.

=== Secretary General of the CDU in North Rhine-Westphalia, 2022–present ===
In November 2022, Ziemiak was appointed by Hendrik Wüst as Secretary General of the CDU in North Rhine-Westphalia.

== Political positions ==
Within the CDU, Ziemiak represents the party’s more conservative wing. For example, he has stated that he is opposed to a revision of German criminal law paragraph 219a, which prohibits public advertisement of abortion procedures.

== Other activities ==
=== Corporate boards ===
- Bädergesellschaft Iserlohn mbH, Member of the Supervisory Board
- Energie AG, Member of the Supervisory Board
- Stadtwerke Iserlohn GmbH, Member of the Supervisory Board

=== Non-profit organizations ===
- Konrad Adenauer Foundation (KAS), Member

Party political offices
Preceded by Annegret Kramp-Karrenbauer	General Secretary of the Christian Democratic Union; 2018–2022	Succeeded by Mario Czaja
