= Bettina Lugk =

German politician

Member of the Bundestag
- Incumbent
- Assumed office 2021
- Preceded by: Dagmar Freitag

Personal details
- Born: 3 February 1982 (age 44) Ludwigsfelde, East Germany (now Germany)
- Party: SPD
- Education: Free University of Berlin

Bettina Lugk (born 3 February 1982) is a German politician of the Social Democratic Party (SPD) who has been serving as a member of the Bundestag since 2021.

== Education and early career ==
Lugk was born 1982 in the East German town of Ludwigsfelde and studied geography. From 2013 to 2021, she worked as parliamentary advisor to Ulla Schmidt.

== Political career ==
Lugk became a member of the Bundestag in the 2021 national elections, representing the Märkischer Kreis II district.

In parliament, Lugk has since been serving on the Committee on Foreign Affairs, its Subcommittee on Foreign Cultural and Educational Policy, and the Sports Committee.

In addition to her committee assignments, Lugk has been a member of the German delegation to the NATO Parliamentary Assembly since 2022. In this capacity, she has been serving on the Political Committee and its Subcommittee on Transatlantic Relations.
