= Herscheid =

- Town
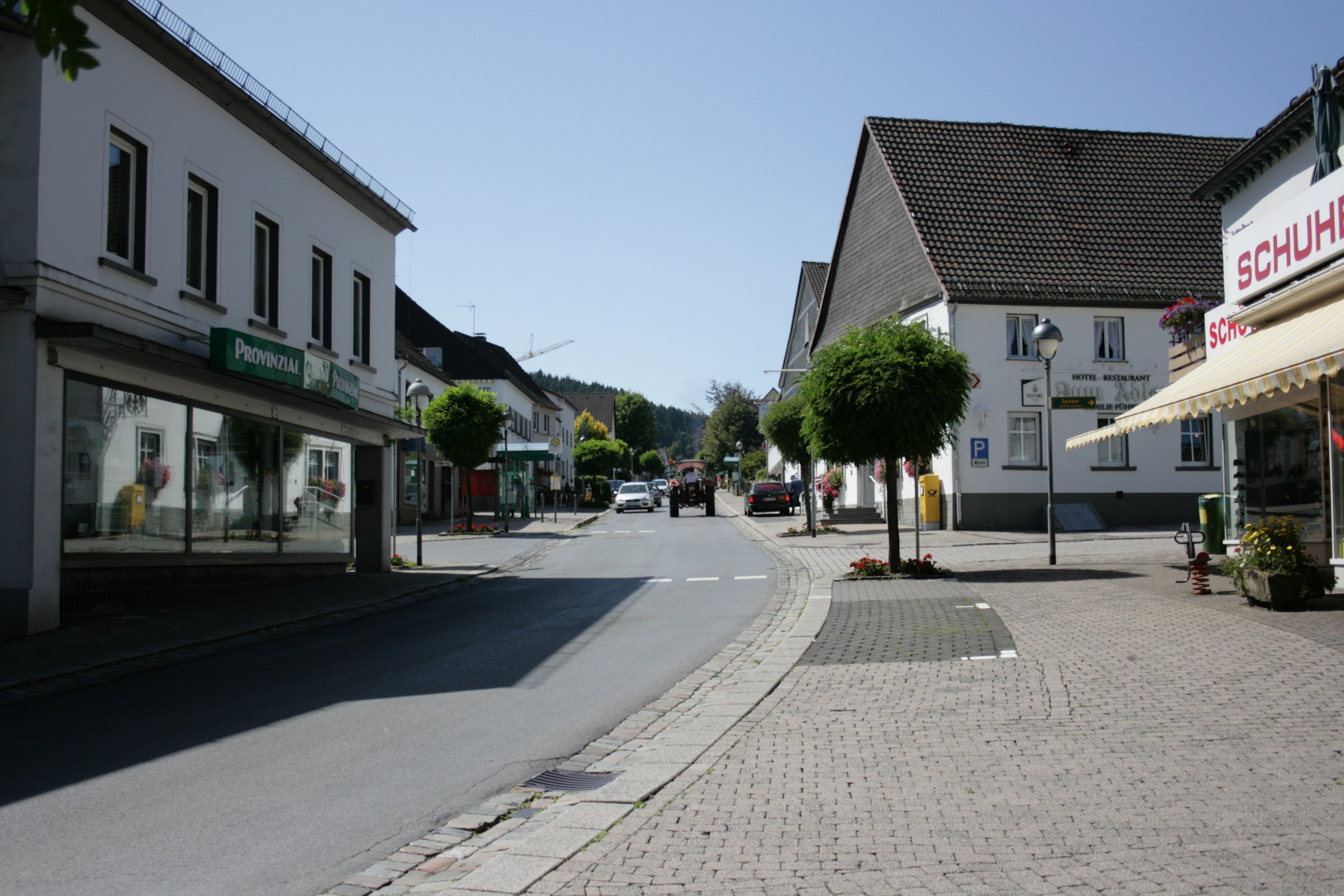

- Coat of arms

- Location of Herscheid within Märkischer Kreis district
- Interactive map of Herscheid
- Location within Germany Location within North Rhine-Westphalia
- Coordinates: 51°10′N 07°45′E
- Country: Germany
- State: North Rhine-Westphalia
- Admin. region: Arnsberg
- District: Märkischer Kreis

Government
  - Mayor (2020–25): Uwe Schmalenbach (Ind.)

Area
  - Total: 59.4 km^{2} (22.9 sq mi)
- Elevation: 250–663 m (820–2,175 ft)

Population (2025-12-31)
  - Total: 6,679
  - Density: 112/km^{2} (291/sq mi)
- Time zone: UTC+01:00 (CET)
  - Summer (DST): UTC+02:00 (CEST)
- Postal codes: 58849
- Dialling codes: 02357
- Vehicle registration: MK
- Website: www.herscheid.de

Herscheid (German pronunciation: [ˈheːɐ̯ʃaɪt]; Westphalian: Hiärschge) is a municipality in the southern Märkischer Kreis, in North Rhine-Westphalia, Germany.

== Geography ==
Herscheid is located in the Ebbegebirge ("Ebbe Mountains"), a part of the Sauerland mountains. Altitudes in the municipality extend from 250m above sea level in the valley of the Schwarze Ahe up to the highest elevation, the 663.3 metres (2,176 ft) high Nordhelle. The municipality covers an area of 58.924 square kilometres (22.751 sq mi), of which 58% is forest and 33% is used agriculturally. Most of the area is protected as a nature reserve, the Naturpark Ebbegebirge.

=== Neighbouring places ===
- Werdohl
- Plettenberg
- Meinerzhagen
- Lüdenscheid

== History ==
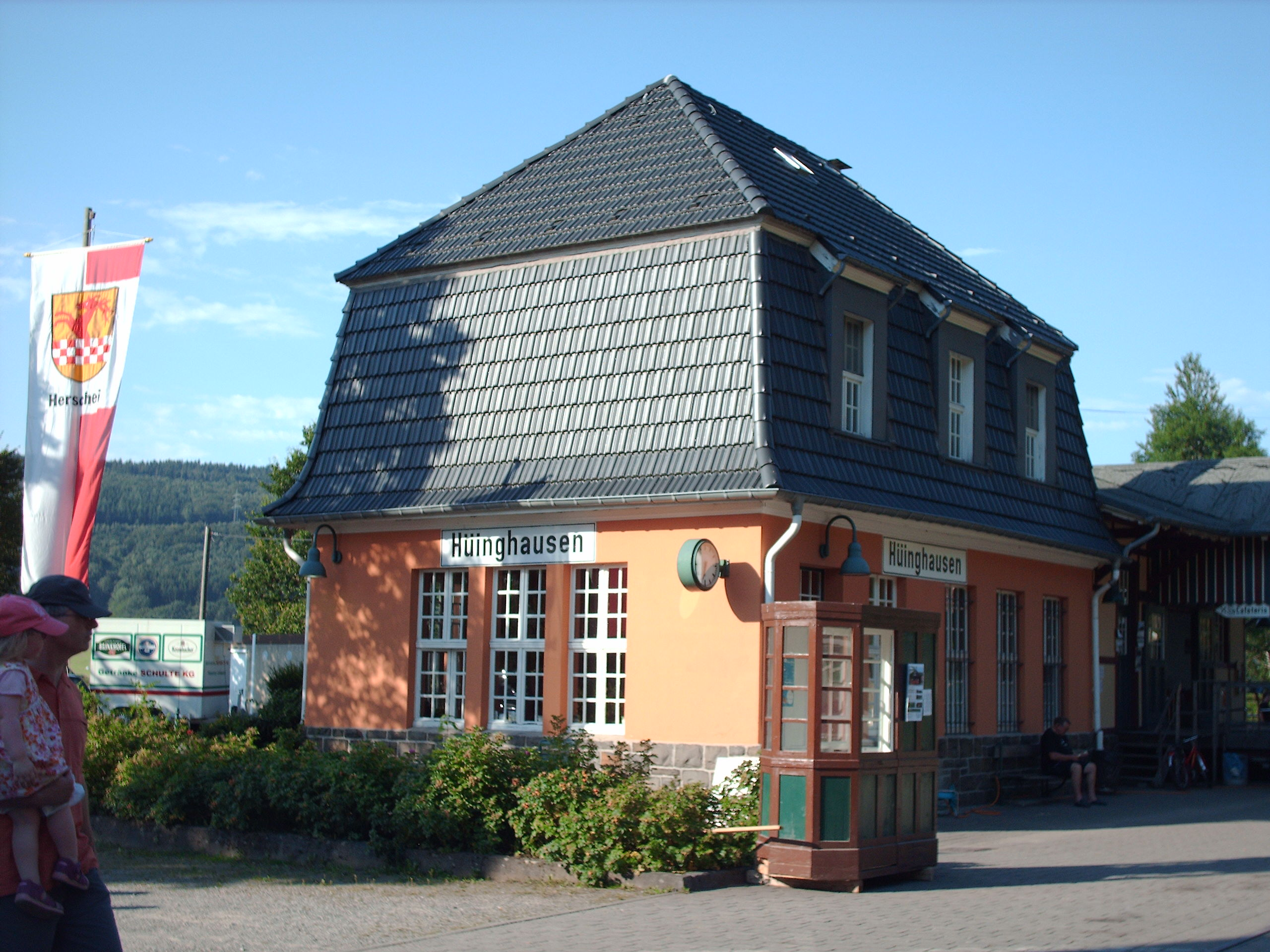
Station Hüinghausen

The first written document mentioning Hertsceido dates from 1072 in a charter from Grafschaft Abbey of Anno II, Archbishop of Cologne. However, the settlements in what is now the municipal area probably date back to the 4th century. From the 12th century till 1753 the parish of Herscheid formed a court district. During the French occupation (1806 till 1814), the Mairie Ebbe covered Herscheid and neighbouring Valbert.

The station Hüinghausen was made for narrow gauge railway.

== Population ==
Historical population

Year	Pop.	±% p.a.
1965	4,957	—
1970	5,504	+2.12%
1975	6,111	+2.11%
1980	6,651	+1.71%
1985	6,767	+0.35%
1990	7,141	+1.08%
1995	7,492	+0.96%

Year	Pop.	±% p.a.
2000	7,574	+0.22%
2005	7,602	+0.07%
2010	7,216	−1.04%
2015	7,217	+0.00%
2020	6,988	−0.64%
2025	6,679	−0.90%

Source: Landesdatabank Nordrhein-Westfalen

== Coat of arms ==
The coat of arms of Herscheid is above a fess abased chequy of three rows gules and argent, a demi-stag salient proper. The stag, or deer, (German Hirsch) has a double significance: it refers both to the etymological origin of the name Herscheid as area where deer live and also to the old hunting privileges formerly enjoyed here (said to have been given by one of the Counts of the Mark as reward for help in fighting in the Ebbe mountains against the episcopal state of Cologne). The red-and-white chequered fess of the Counts also appears, Herscheid having been formerly part of their territory. The coat of arms was designed by Otto Hupp, and was granted on October 17, 1935. The coat of arms is also featured on the town flag.

== Persons of interest ==
- Wilhelm Ackermann, (1896–1962) German mathematician
- Otto Corbach, (1877–1938) journalist
