= Christel Voßbeck-Kayser =

German politician (born 1961)

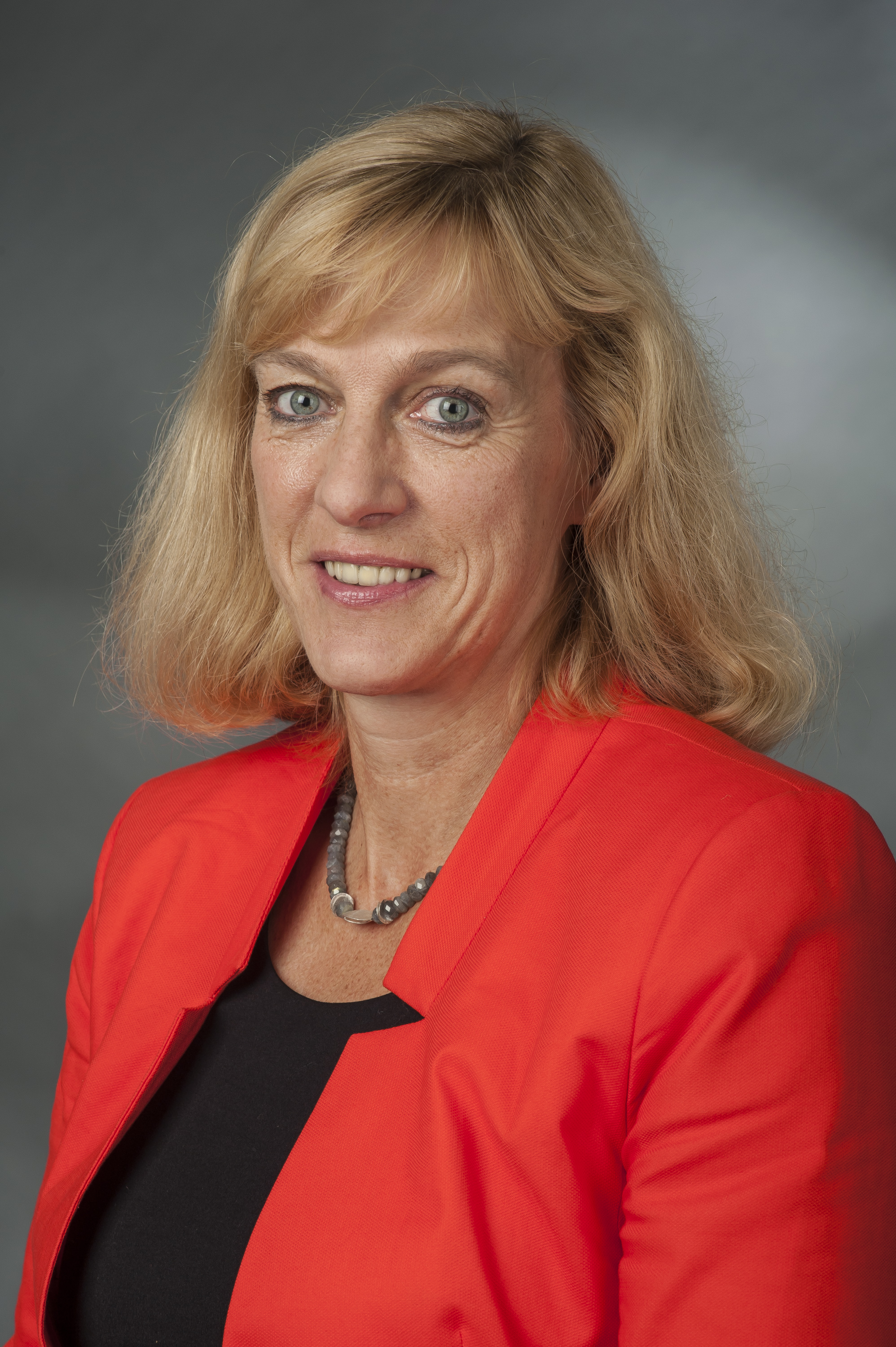

Personal details
- Born: Christel Hedwig Ernestine Voßbeck-Kayser; 1 June 1961 (age 65) Recke, Germany
- Party: CDU
- Education: Catholic University of North Rhine-Westphalia

Christel Hedwig Ernestine Voßbeck-Kayser (born 1 June 1961 in Recke, Germany) is a German politician (CDU).

== Biography ==
In 1980, she passed her Abitur at the Goethe-Gymnasium Ibbenbüren. Four years later, she graduated from the Catholic University of North Rhine-Westphalia with a degree in social pedagogy. From 1985, she initially worked at the Westphalian State Hospital in Münster, and since 1986 she has been employed by the district administration of the Märkischer Kreis in the social psychiatric service. Christel Voßbeck-Kayser lives with her family in Altena.

== Political career ==
In the 2013 Bundestag election, Voßbeck-Kayser was elected as a member of the German Bundestag via position 34 on the CDU state list for North Rhine-Westphalia, but lost out as a direct candidate by a margin of just 53 votes to her competitor Dagmar Freitag (SPD). In the 2017 election, the result in the first votes was also close: she fell short of victory as a direct candidate by 1,173 votes, which corresponded to 0.8% of the first votes. Since she was not secured with one of the front places via the state list, she dropped out of the Bundestag.
