= Otto Corbach =

German journalist and publicist

- Born: 1877; Herscheid
- Died: 1938 (aged 60–61)
- Occupation(s): Journalist, publicist, editor
- Years active: 1900-1938 (approximate)
- Employer: Deutsch-Asiatische Warte (as editor)
- Known for: Criticism of Wilhelminian Germany, association with Die Aktion

Otto Corbach (1877–1938) was a German journalist and publicist.

== Biography ==
Corbach was born in Herscheid and moved to Qingdao in 1900, at that time the administrative centre of the Kiautschou Bay concession. He had a position as an accountant, probably for Kappler & Sohn as he was staying in Kappler's house. He started editing the paper Deutsch-Asiatische Warte (German-Asian Viewpoint). However in 1902 he got in trouble for criticising the authorities and returned to Germany. He worked as an editor first in Kassel and then in Wrocław before moving to Berlin.

Corbach was a friend of Franz Pfemfert and shared his readiness to use the writings of Friedrich Nietzsche to criticise Wilhelminian Germany. He was a regular contributor to Pfemfert's Die Aktion.

== Texts in English ==
- "Air Strategy in Asia", (1935), The Living Age, July 1, 1935, pp. 397–398 translation of an article in Berliner Tageblatt
- "Japan and Siam", (1936), The Living Age, April 1, 1936, pp. 128–129 translation of an article in Berliner Tageblatt
