= Halver =

- Town
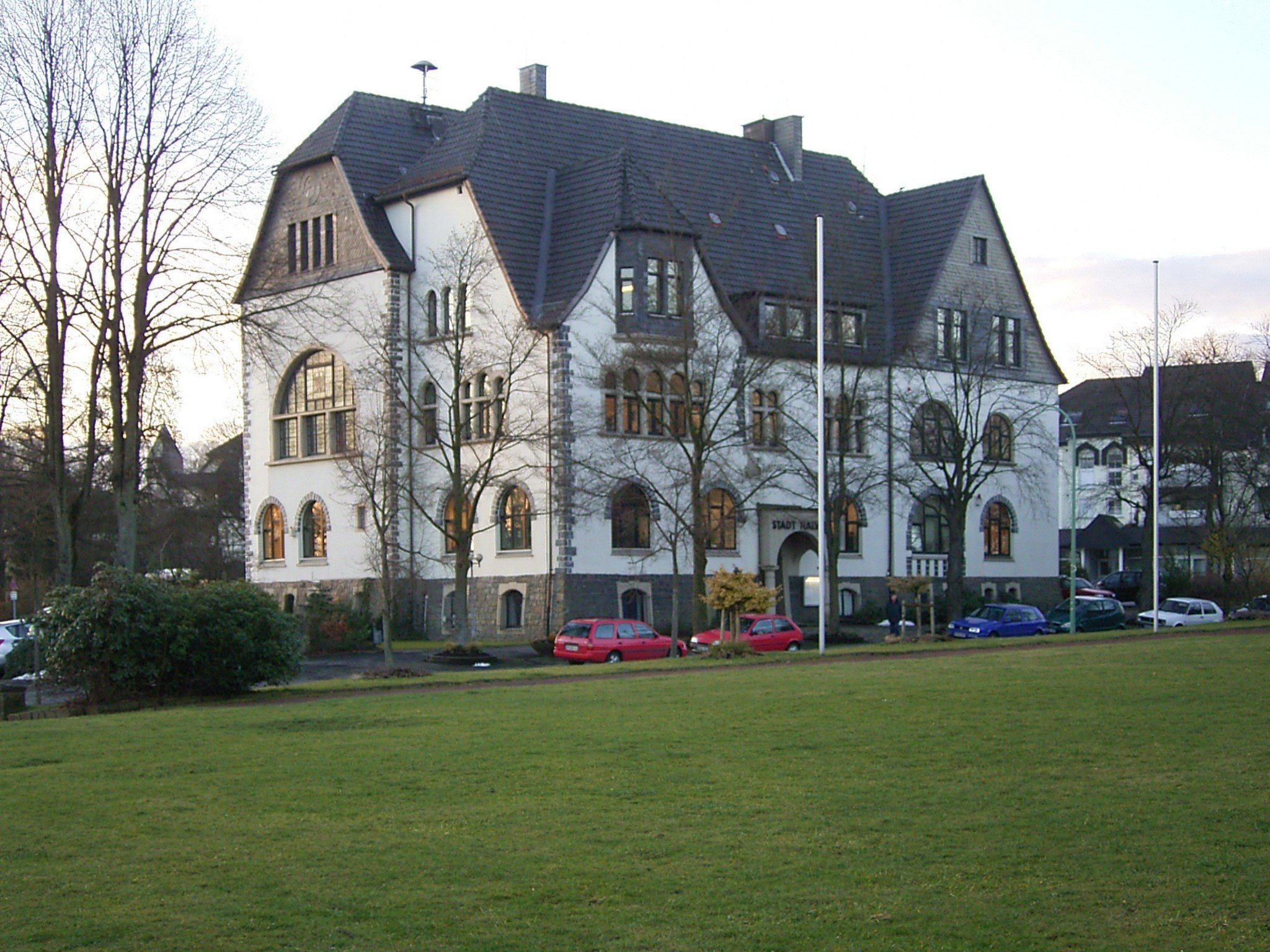
- Halver town hall in 2008

- Coat of arms

- Location of Halver within Märkischer Kreis district
- Interactive map of Halver
- Location within Germany Location within North Rhine-Westphalia
- Coordinates: 51°11′N 07°28′E
- Country: Germany
- State: North Rhine-Westphalia
- Admin. region: Arnsberg
- District: Märkischer Kreis

Government
  - Mayor (2020–25): Michael Brosch (SPD)

Area
  - Total: 77.23 km^{2} (29.82 sq mi)
- Elevation: 440 m (1,440 ft)

Population (2025-12-31)
  - Total: 16,176
  - Density: 209.5/km^{2} (542.5/sq mi)
- Time zone: UTC+01:00 (CET)
  - Summer (DST): UTC+02:00 (CEST)
- Postal codes: 58553
- Dialling codes: 02353
- Vehicle registration: MK
- Website: www.halver.de

Halver (German pronunciation: [ˈhɑlfɐ]) is a town in the Märkischer Kreis district, in North Rhine-Westphalia, Germany.

== History ==
Around 950 the Oberhof Halvara was first mentioned in the Werdener Probsteiregister. For more than 500 years Halver was the seat of a Fehmic court, the earliest definite evidence of which is in 1243; it ceased to exist in 1753. This court was most famous because of the trial of duke Henry XVI the Rich of Bavaria-Landshut and the knight of Toerring on May 2, 1430.

With effect from October 1, 1912, the municipality Halver was split, Schalksmühle becoming an independent municipality. Both were administered together in the Amt Halver. As part of the communal reforms of the district of Altena the Amt was dissolved on January 1, 1969, and Halver was granted city rights.

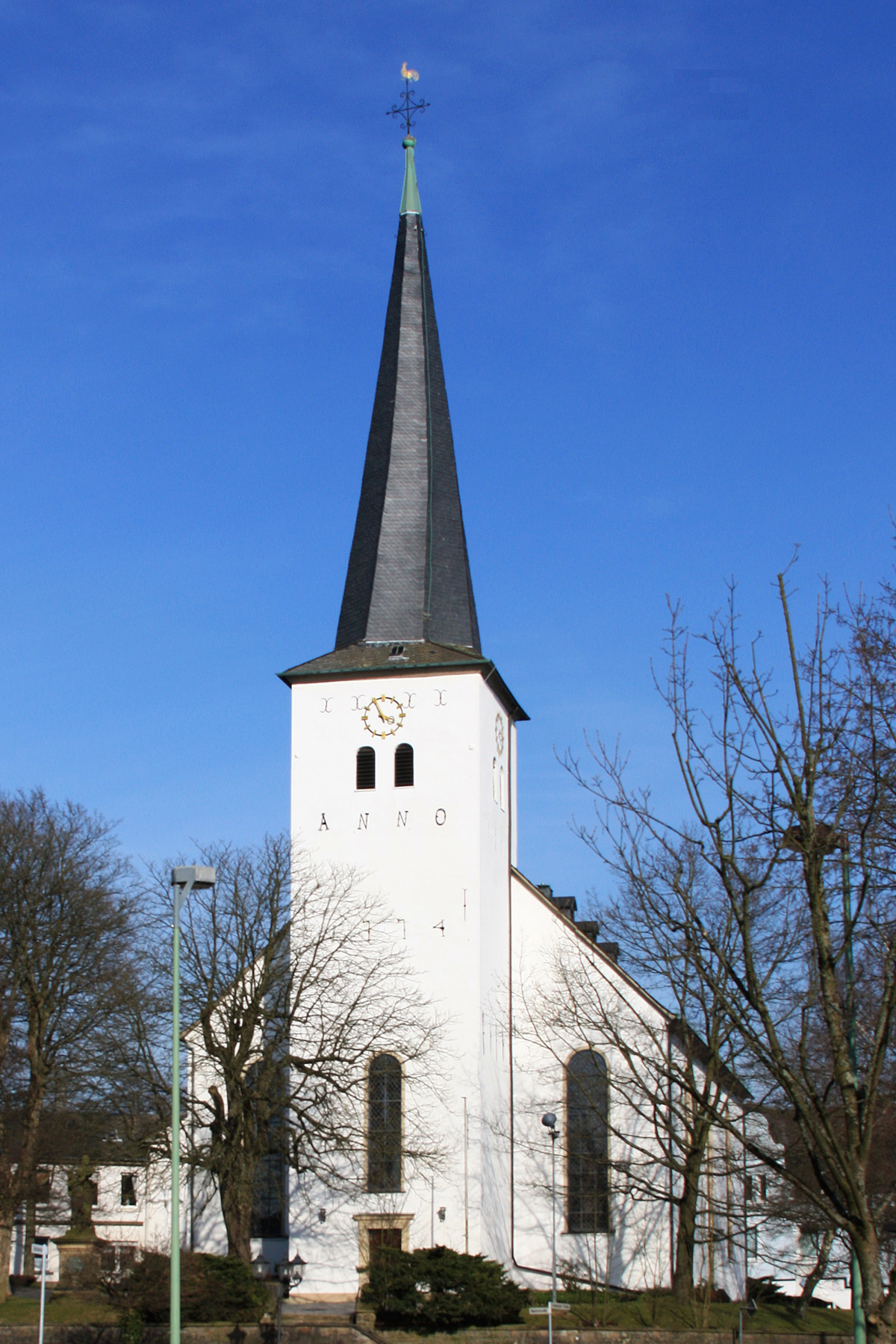
Nicolai church

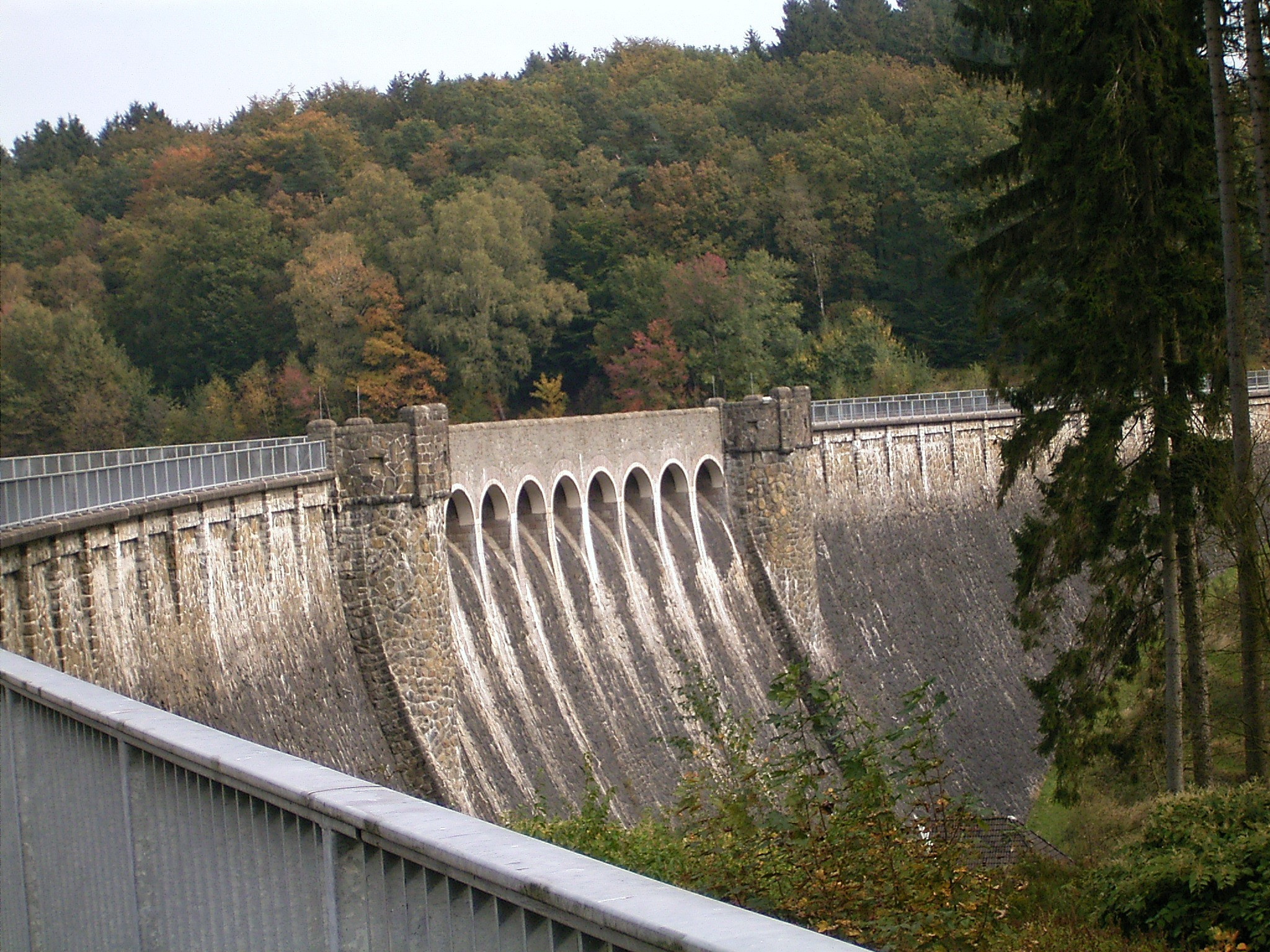
Kerspetalsperre (Dam)

Station

== Coat of arms ==
The red and white checked base refers to the fess from the arms of the Counts of the Mark. The stone judgement table under a linden tree represents the Feme court. It was designed by Otto Hupp, and was granted on March 29, 1935.

The Amt Halver had a separate coat of arms, which was also designed by Otto Hupp. It combined elements from the two member municipalities Halver and Schalksmühle: in the upper part is a linden branch symbolizing Halver, in the bottom the upper half of a black mill wheel as the symbol of Schalksmühle. Separating the two is the red and white checked fess, as above. The coat of arms was granted on June 8, 1936, and expired with the dissolving of the Amt in 1969.

== Number of inhabitants ==
Historical population

Year	Pop.	±% p.a.
1915	6,476	—
1925	7,729	+1.78%
1935	8,122	+0.50%
1939	8,772	+1.94%
1946	12,045	+4.63%
1961	13,684	+0.85%
1965	14,891	+2.14%
1970	15,576	+0.90%
1975	15,165	−0.53%
1980	15,340	+0.23%

Year	Pop.	±% p.a.
1985	14,807	−0.70%
1990	16,260	+1.89%
1995	17,168	+1.09%
2000	17,534	+0.42%
2005	17,480	−0.06%
2010	16,717	−0.89%
2015	16,117	−0.73%
2020	16,108	−0.01%
2025	16,176	+0.08%

Source: Landesdatabank Nordrhein-Westfalen (1965-2025)

== Mayor ==
At the election in 2015, Michael Brosch (SPD) became the new mayor in Halver, he won against his predecessor Dr. Bernd Eicker.

== International relations ==
The town twinning with the Swedish city Katrineholm originated from the connection between a music group from Halver and a traditional dancing group from Katrineholm. It was officially signed on September 30, 1963.

On April 25, 1975, the twinning agreement with the French city Hautmont was signed. There has also been a city friendship with Pardess-Hanna in Israel since 1989.

== Sons and daughters of the town ==
- Eugen Schmalenbach (1873-1955), economist, the local commercial vocational school was named after him
