= Nachrodt-Wiblingwerde =

- Town
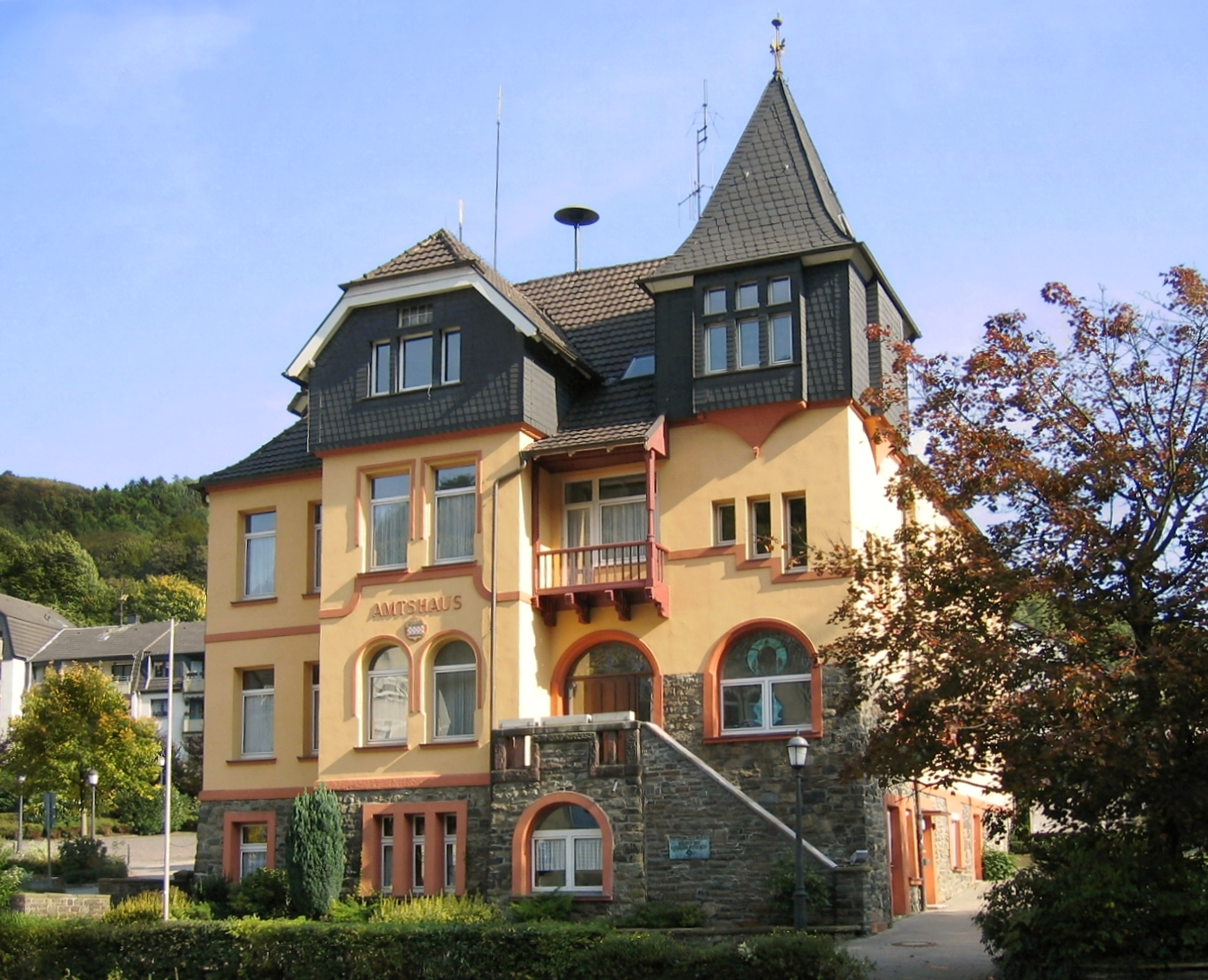
- Old town hall (Amtshaus)

- Coat of arms

- Location of Nachrodt-Wiblingwerde within Märkischer Kreis district
- Interactive map of Nachrodt-Wiblingwerde
- Location within Germany Location within North Rhine-Westphalia
- Coordinates: 51°19′N 07°39′E
- Country: Germany
- State: North Rhine-Westphalia
- Admin. region: Arnsberg
- District: Märkischer Kreis
- Subdivisions: 7

Government
  - Mayor (2018–23): Birgit Tupat (Ind.)

Area
  - Total: 29.03 km^{2} (11.21 sq mi)
- Elevation: 305 m (1,001 ft)

Population (2025-12-31)
  - Total: 6,022
  - Density: 207.4/km^{2} (537.3/sq mi)
- Time zone: UTC+01:00 (CET)
  - Summer (DST): UTC+02:00 (CEST)
- Postal codes: 58769
- Dialling codes: 02352 u. 02334
- Vehicle registration: MK
- Website: www.nachrodt-wiblingwerde.de

Nachrodt-Wiblingwerde (German pronunciation: [ˈnaːxʁɔt ˌvɪblɪŋˈvɛʁdə]) is a municipality in the Märkischer Kreis, North Rhine-Westphalia, Germany.

== Geography ==
The municipality is split into two main settlements. Nachrodt is located in the valley of the river Lenne at an altitude of 140 m above sea level, while Wiblingwerde is located at an altitude of 480 m on the hills of the Lennegebirge, one of the hill chains in the Sauerland mountains.

=== Division of the municipality ===
- Nachrodt:
  - Obstfeld
  - Einsal
  - Opperhusen
  - Holensiepen
- Wiblingwerde:
  - Veserde
  - Rennerde
  - Brenscheid
  - Sassenscheid
  - Eilerde
  - Herlsen
  - Wörden
  - Kaltenborn

== History ==
The municipality was formed in 1907, when the Amt Altena was dissolved. The two municipalities Kelleramt and Wiblingwerde were merged into the new municipality Nachrodt-Wiblingwerde, which was no longer member in an Amt anymore.

== Population ==
Historical population

Year	Pop.	±% p.a.
1965	6,303	—
1970	6,819	+1.59%
1975	6,720	−0.29%
1980	6,824	+0.31%
1985	6,525	−0.89%
1990	6,469	−0.17%
1995	6,964	+1.49%

Year	Pop.	±% p.a.
2000	7,011	+0.13%
2005	6,890	−0.35%
2010	6,724	−0.49%
2015	6,644	−0.24%
2020	6,466	−0.54%
2025	6,022	−1.41%

Source: Landesdatabank Nordrhein-Westfalen

== Coat of arms ==
The coat of arms of the municipality shows in the top part the red and silver rose from the church seal of the Kirchspiel Wiblingwerde. In the bottom is a wavy line representing the river Lenne and thus Nachrodt. Both symbols are separated by the red-and-silver chequered bar of the Mark. The coat of arms was designed by Otto Hupp, and was granted on October 17, 1935.
