= Hager Group =

German company

- Type: Societas Europaea
- Industry: Electrical manufacturing
- Founded: 1955
- Headquarters: Blieskastel, Germany
- Key people: Sabine Busse (CEO); Mike Elbers (CMO); Michael Flieger (CFO); Franck Houdebert (CHRO); Ralph Fürderer (CTO)
- Revenue: ▲€3.2 billion (2023)
- Number of employees: ▲13,000 (2023)
- Website: hager.com

Hager SE is a manufacturer of electrical installations specialized in electrical installations for residential, commercial and industrial buildings, based in Blieskastel, Germany. The company has been family-run and owned ever since its foundation in Ensheim (Saarland) in 1955 by family Hager.

Hager is producing wiring components mainly for residential homes. Due to acquisitions of specialized companys worldwide since the 1990this, Hager SE offers products ranging from energy distribution, cable management to building automation and security systems today by the brand Hager. The group operates in over 120 countries and employs approximately 13,000 people, generating revenue of €3.2 billion in 2023.

The company's products, marketed under the Hager brand, include electrical energy distribution, cable management, smart building management and security devices. Hager Group owns the brands Berker, Bocchiotti, Daitem, Diagral, Elcom, E3/DC and Pmflex, as well as energy management companies Eficia and Advizeo.

== History ==
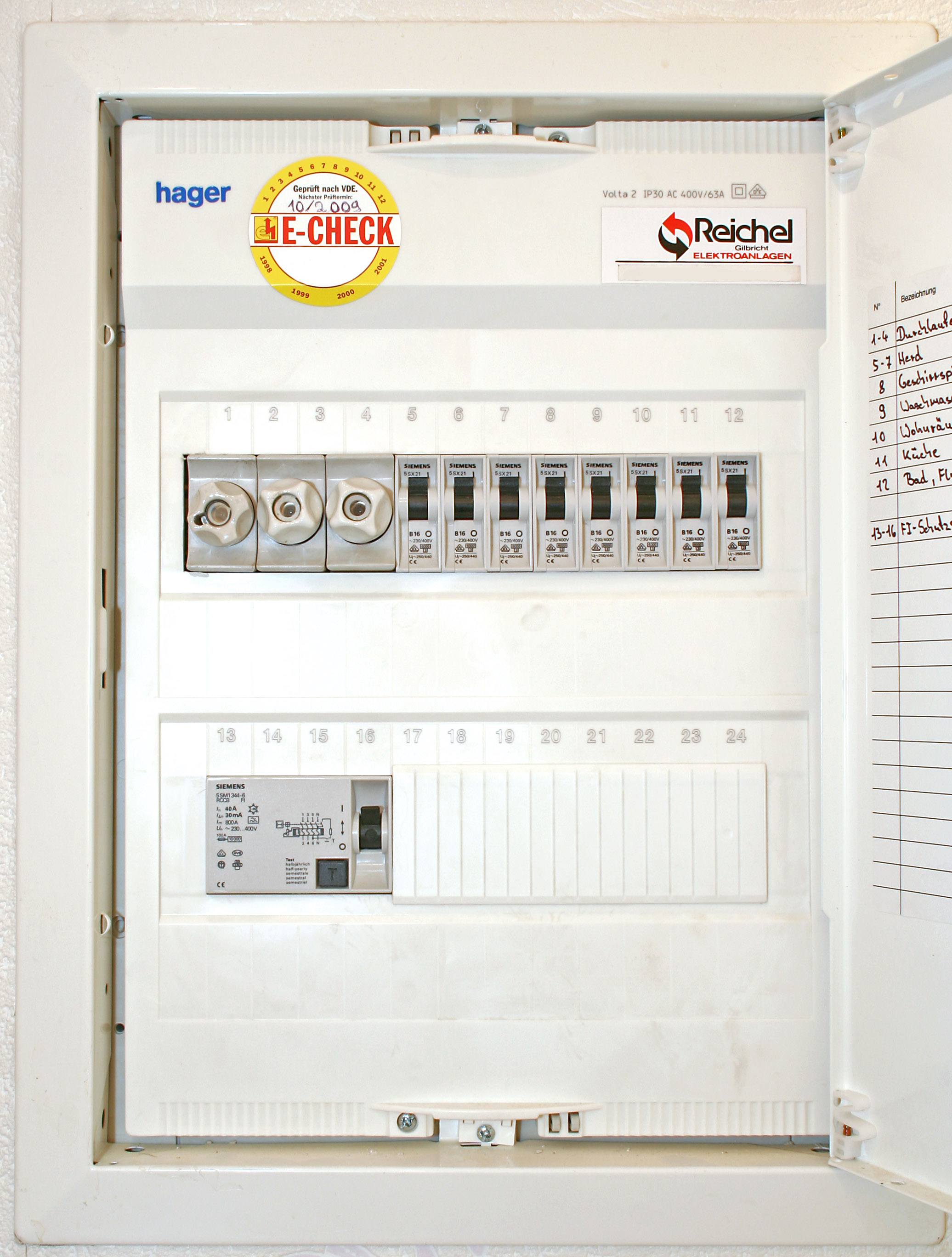
Hager distribution board

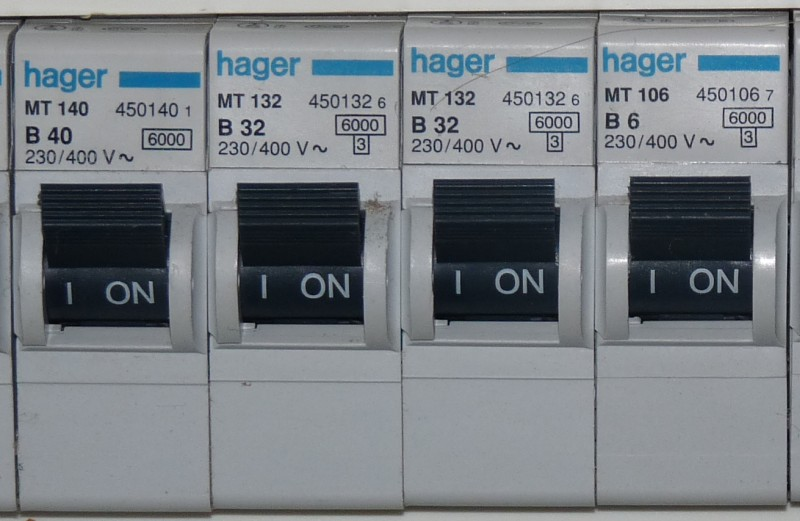
Hager miniature circuit breakers

In 1955, Hager oHG, elektrotechnische Fabrik was founded by brothers Oswald and Hermann Hager, together with their father Peter Hager in Ensheim in the Saarland region of Germany. Since 1945, Saarland had been under the economic control of France and had no access to the German market. However, Hager wanted to gain a foothold in both markets. In 1959, the Hager brothers founded their first foreign subsidiary, Hager Electro S. A., in Obernai, Alsace, in north-eastern France.

Hager's modular rotary fuse carrier was patented in Germany in 1968 and in France in 1970. At the same time, the first mass-produced distribution board, the Hager-Rapid-System, was launched on the French market. In 1973, Hager achieved sales of 43 million Deutsche Marks in Germany and in 1974 the company reached a turnover of 22 million francs in France.

In 1976, Hager launched the mini Gamma enclosure, in 1982 the company started producing the first Residual-current circuit breakers (RCCB) in Germany. A new production facility with a high-bay warehouse was opened in Blieskastel.

Hager Group began to market itself as a complete service provider for electrical installations in buildings in the 1980s, setting up sales companies in Europe (Switzerland and Great Britain). In the mid-1990s, Hager set up distribution channels in the United Arab Emirates (Dubai), Singapore, Malaysia, Hong Kong, China, Australia and New Zealand.

In 2007, Hager Group became a European Company: Hager SE.

In August 2019, the group was ranked number 128 in the top 500 family-owned businesses in Germany according to the magazine Die Deutsche Wirtschaft.

== Locations ==
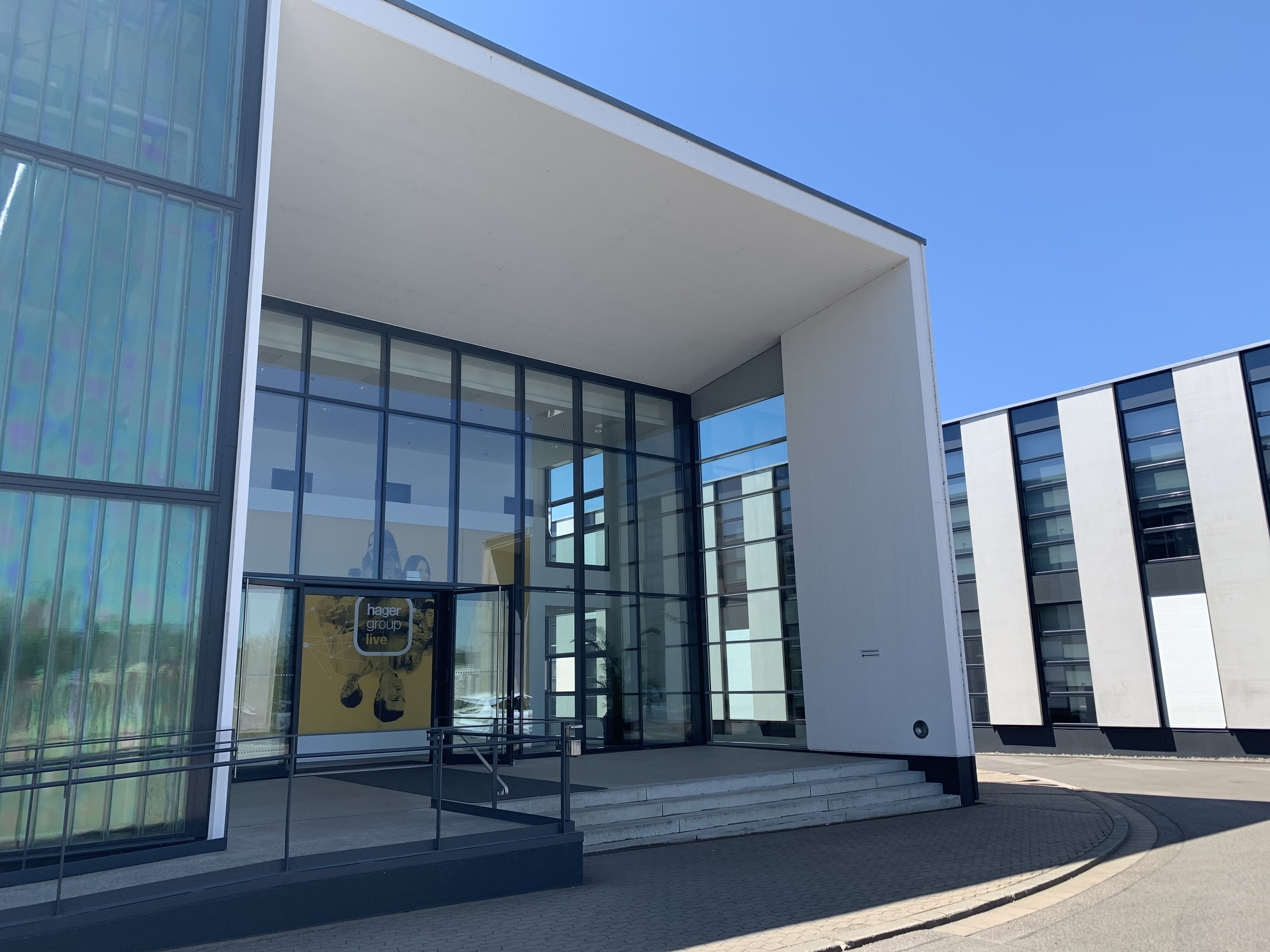
Entry to production hall of Hager Group in Blieskastel, Germany. Photo: Hager Group

Hager Group has 22 manufacturing sites in 10 countries across the world. Components for the respective markets are manufactured at the local production facilities in order to accommodate local installation requirements. The biggest production site is in Obernai, France. Hager Forum was established there in 2015 as a training and meeting place for partners, customers and employees of the company.

== Acquisitions ==
In 1992, the group acquired Lumetal, a manufacturer of distribution boards from Porcia, Italy. Hager Group acquired the German company Tehalit in 1996, a manufacturer of cable management systems and cable ducts.

In 1998, the group acquired the French electronic timer manufacturer Flash, whose registered office was in Saverne. Prior to this, Hager Group manufactured only mechanical timers. The same year, the company also acquired British manufacturer Ashley & Rock from Ulverston, whose products were manufactured according to British Standards.

In 2002, the Polish company Polo, whose registered office was in Tychy, was integrated into the company, in 2004, Hager Group acquired Swiss company Weber AG and French manufacturer Atral. In addition to Hager brand security systems, Atral also manufactures products for the brands Diagral, Daitem and Logisty.

In 2006, Hager entered the Brazilian market when it acquired 100 % of the shares in the company Eletromar. Hager Group opened a plant in Pune, India in 2008 and on 30 September of the same year, the foundation stone for a new Eletromar production site in Brazil was laid. On 1 January 2009, Hager acquired Electraplan Solutions GmbH, and in 2010, Hager acquired Berker, a German manufacturer of switches, whose registered offices were in Schalksmühle and Ottfingen.

2012 Hager gained the German family firm Elcom, a producer of intercoms.

In 2018, it acquired E3/DC GmbH, a German developer of inverters and energy storage systems. in the same year, Hager Group has been working on electromobility with Audi AG. The aim of the collaboration is to connect the Audi e-Tron model with Hager Group's Home Energy Management System (HEMS).

== Brands and products ==
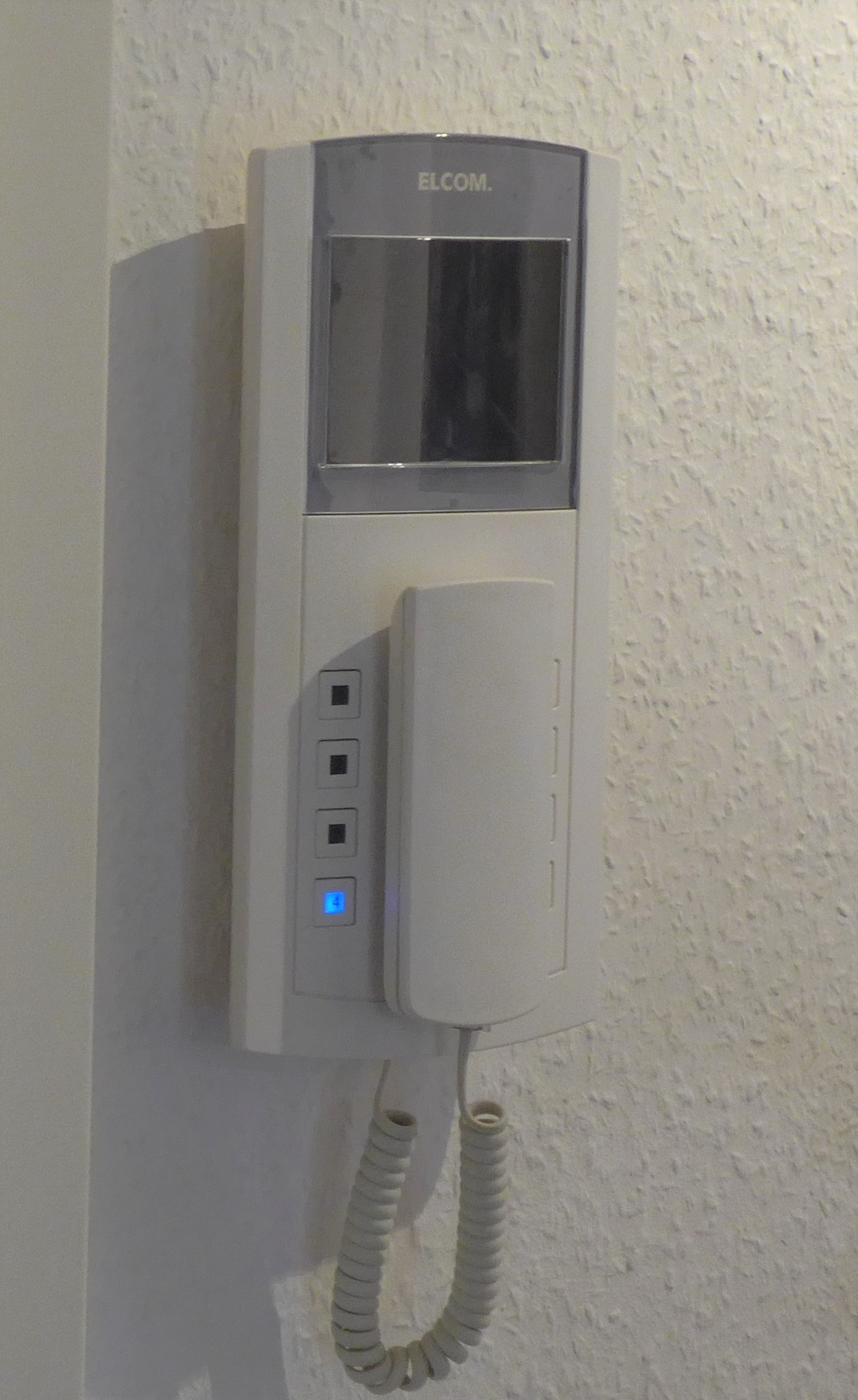
Elcom intercom with colour screen

Under the Hager brand, the group markets solutions and services for electrical installations in residential, commercial and industrial buildings. Since 2009, the former brands Tehalit, Weber, Lume, Klik, Flash, Polo, Ashley & Rock and Logisty have been united under the Hager brand.

Alarms and security systems are sold under Daitem and Diagral. Berker manufactures switches and switch systems as part of Hager Group. Bocchiotti/Iboco, the Italian market leader in cable management and room distribution systems, is also part of Hager Group whilst Elcom produces intercom systems for residential and office buildings. Since 2023, this activity has been strengthened by the integration of Pmflex, a European specialist in electrical conduits.

=== Product types ===
There are four different areas of application for Hager Group's products and services:

- Energy distribution and metering systems, including energy management and VDI concepts for electrical installation
- Cable management systems for power and data distribution
- Switch ranges and building control
- Security systems

=== Brands ===
- Bocchiotti/Iboco, Italian producer of room distribution systems
- Berker, German brand for electrical installation applications, switches and switch systems
- Daitem
- Diagral

== Corporate culture ==
6% of sales are invested in research and development. In 2019, the company filed around 3,000 patents. The group employs around 800 people in research and development, which mainly focuses on electromobility, intelligent building technology (for smart homes) and energy efficiency.

== Sustainability ==
In November 2024, Hager Group obtained EcoVadis Platinum certification with a score of 83/100.

== Sponsorship ==
From October 2010 to June 2014, Hager Group sponsored football club 1. FC Saarbrücken. In 2015 the football club sued Hager for missing sponsor payments. Hager argued that as the club was demoted to the third division, the sponsor contract was no longer valid. The two parties settled out of court for half of the total paymetn, 150.000 euro. In 2017, the group became the main partner of Racing Club de Strasbourg Alsace, under a three-year sponsorship agreement.
