= Philipp Mißfelder =

German politician (1979–2015)

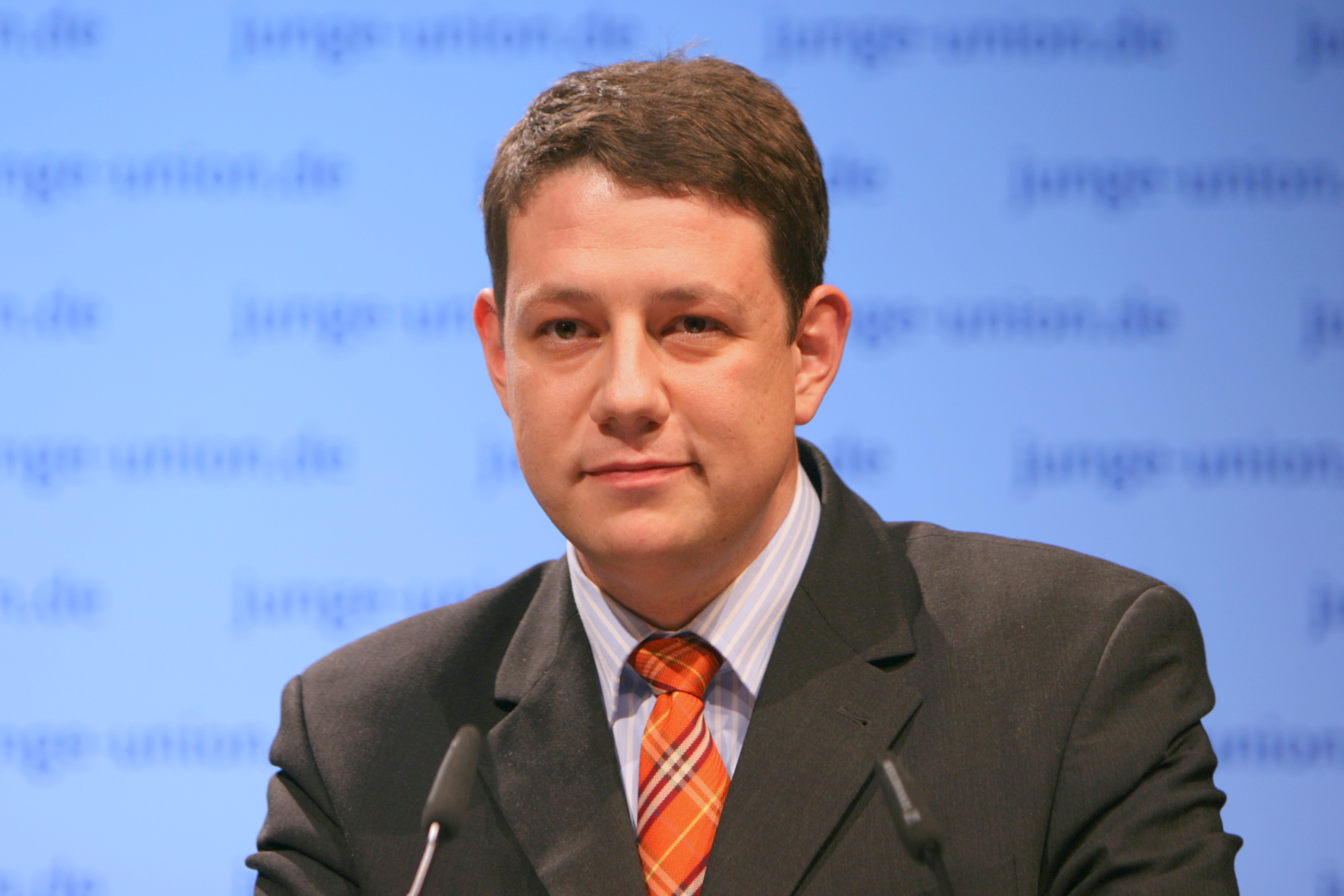

Member of the Bundestag
- In office 18 October 2005 – 13 July 2015

Personal details
- Born: 25 August 1979 Gelsenkirchen, Northrhine-Westphalia, West Germany
- Died: 13 July 2015 (aged 35) Dülmen, Northrhine-Westphalia, Germany
- Party: Christian Democratic Union
- Education: Technische Universität Berlin
- Profession: Historian

Philipp Mißfelder (25 August 1979 – 13 July 2015) was a German politician and a member of the German Bundestag. From January through March 2014, he served in the German government as the Coordinator for Transatlantic Cooperation in the Field of Intersocietal Relations, Cultural and Information Policy.

== Life ==
=== Training ===
Mißfelder was born in Gelsenkirchen, Northrhine-Westphalia. After receiving his secondary school certificate in 1999, Mißfelder served as a conscript in the German military. He began studying law in 2000 but changed his course of study to history at the Technische Universität Berlin in 2003. He finished his studies in 2008 while serving in the Bundestag.

=== Party activities ===
Mißfelder joined the Junge Union (JU) in 1993 and the Christian Democratic Union in 1995 and was head of the offshoot Schüler Union from 1998 to 2000. He had been on the CDU's board of directors since 1999 and was voted onto the Junge Union's board of directors in 2002.

Since 2002 Mißfelder had co-chaired a party working group dedicated to improving relations between younger and older citizens. He had been an elected member of the CDU's leadership council, known as the Präsidium, since 2008, and was its youngest member.

=== German Bundestag ===
Mißfelder was a member of the German Bundestag from 2005. He was the CDU/CSU foreign policy spokesman in the Bundestag and a member of the Bundestag's foreign relations committee.

=== Other activities ===
Since 2006, Mißfelder had been a member of the Konrad Adenauer Foundation and was in the Bundestag's European Union parliamentary group. He served as a deputy member of the Haus der Geschichte Foundation in Bonn. Additionally, Mißfelder was on the German-British Society's Königswinter Conference steering and executive committee of the German Council on Foreign Relations (DGAP), among other engagements. In June 2013, he was appointed to the board of directors of the Atlantik-Brücke e.V transatlantic network.
Mißfelder was married since 2006 and had two daughters. He was Roman Catholic.

=== Death and legacy ===
Philipp Mißfelder died unexpectedly on 13 July 2015 of a pulmonary embolism. The chairman of his parliamentary group, Volker Kauder said about Mißfelder: "Our group loses one of its most profiled politicians in foreign affairs and I personally lose a great friend, who accompanied me on many travels. I am distraught, stunned and sad."

The Philipp-Mißfelder Forest in the Negev desert, Israel was named in his honor.

== Political positions ==
=== Within the CDU ===
In the Christian Democratic Union, Mißfelder was known for launching discussions about the party's conservative roots. In 2007, he played a key role in forming the CDU's Einstein Connection, an internal group which aims to reinforce conservatism within the party.

Mißfelder was a key defender of party member Karl-Theodor zu Guttenberg, the German defense minister who was forced to resign his office after a scandal, calling internal criticism of Guttenberg "offensive".

=== Domestic politics ===
Mißfelder was known for his outspoken positions on social and fiscal issues. He gained international attention in 2003 when he said, "I take no stock in 85-year-old people getting hip replacements paid by social welfare". The statement led to demands that he resign from party organs and helped launch a debate over the failing German social welfare system. A similar controversy arose in February 2009 after Mißfelder asserted that a social welfare increase would essentially be a subsidy to the cigarette and liquor industry.

Mißfelder was on-record saying that the German retirement age of 67 should be increased to 70. Additionally, he had argued that German healthcare funding reforms were putting too much of a strain on the younger generation. He voted against the 2008 German healthcare funding reform in the Bundestag, calling it "neither intergenerationally just, nor appropriate for the older generation".

He took a hard line against G8 protestors in Germany, comparing them to the demobilised domestic terror organisation, the Red Army Faction.

=== Foreign politics ===
An influential voice on German foreign affairs, Mißfelder had spoken out against the possible entry of Turkey into the European Union but had supported UN actions in Libya, despite strong internal opposition within Germany.

He strongly criticised famed German author Günter Grass when the latter controversially wrote a poem largely interpreted as being critical of Israel.

After it was revealed that the US government was able to intercept encrypted communications from smartphones, Mißfelder declared that the situation was not one for politicians to engage in, but instead "is a topic between the American government, the NSA and the producers (of the phones)".

In March 2013, Mißfelder praised former German chancellor Gerhard Schröder for speaking out against the War in Iraq. In May 2014, he made headlines when he was one of few German politicians to take part in a birthday celebration for Schröder in St. Petersburg, at which he spoke with Vladimir Putin, on the height of the Russo-Ukrainian War. He had not informed chancellor Angela Merkel or his parliamentary group chairman Volker Kauder of the visit.
