= Kierspe =

- Town
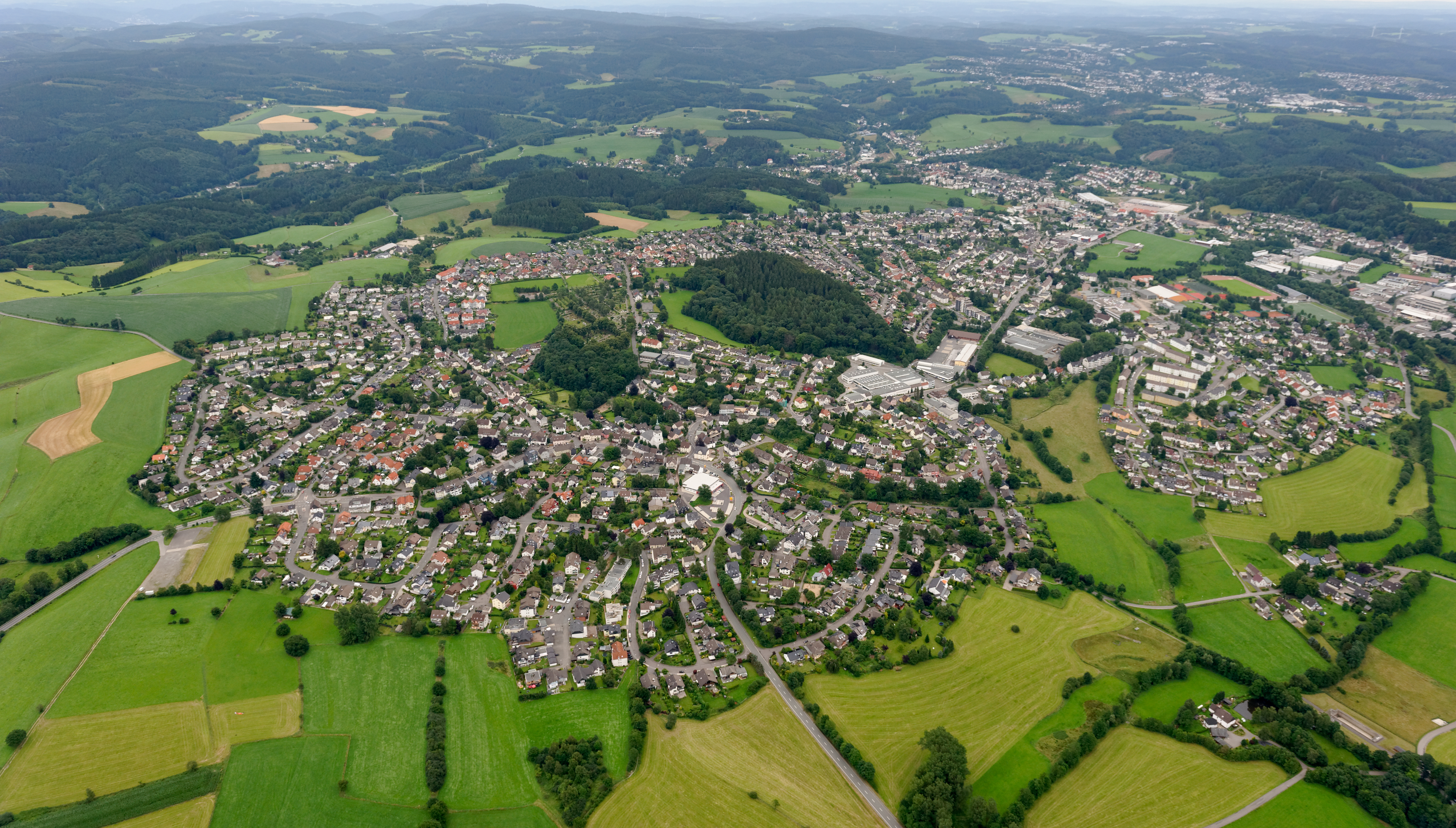
- Aerial view

- Coat of arms

- Location of Kierspe within Märkischer Kreis district
- Interactive map of Kierspe
- Location within Germany Location within North Rhine-Westphalia
- Coordinates: 51°08′N 07°34′E
- Country: Germany
- State: North Rhine-Westphalia
- Admin. region: Arnsberg
- District: Märkischer Kreis

Government
  - Mayor (2020–25): Olaf Stelse (Ind.)

Area
  - Total: 71.91 km^{2} (27.76 sq mi)
- Elevation: 280–552 m (919–1,811 ft)

Population (2025-12-31)
  - Total: 16,192
  - Density: 225.2/km^{2} (583.2/sq mi)
- Time zone: UTC+01:00 (CET)
  - Summer (DST): UTC+02:00 (CEST)
- Postal codes: 58566
- Dialling codes: 02359 (Kierspe); 02269 (Rönsahl)
- Vehicle registration: MK
- Website: www.kierspe.de

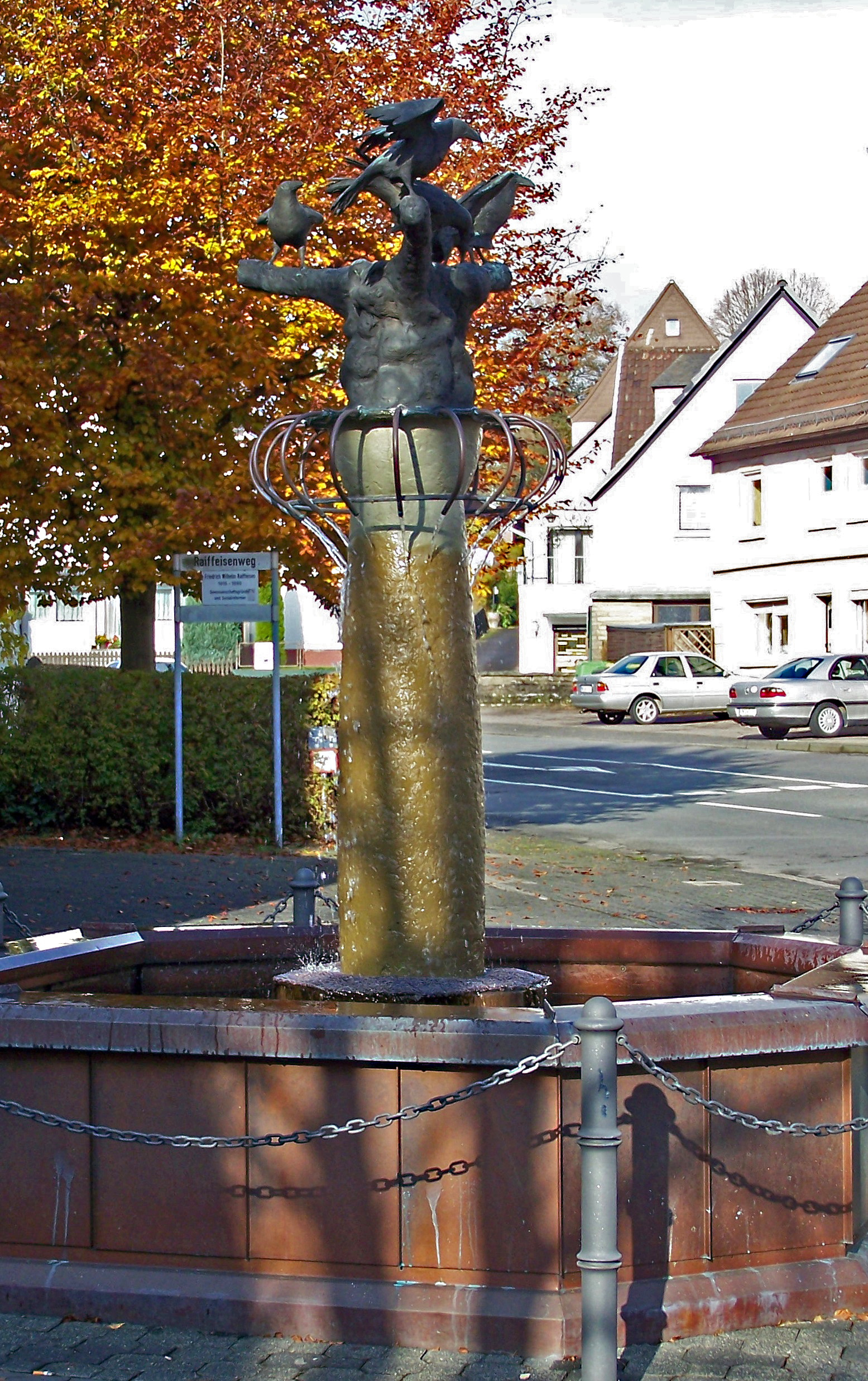
Raukbrunnen

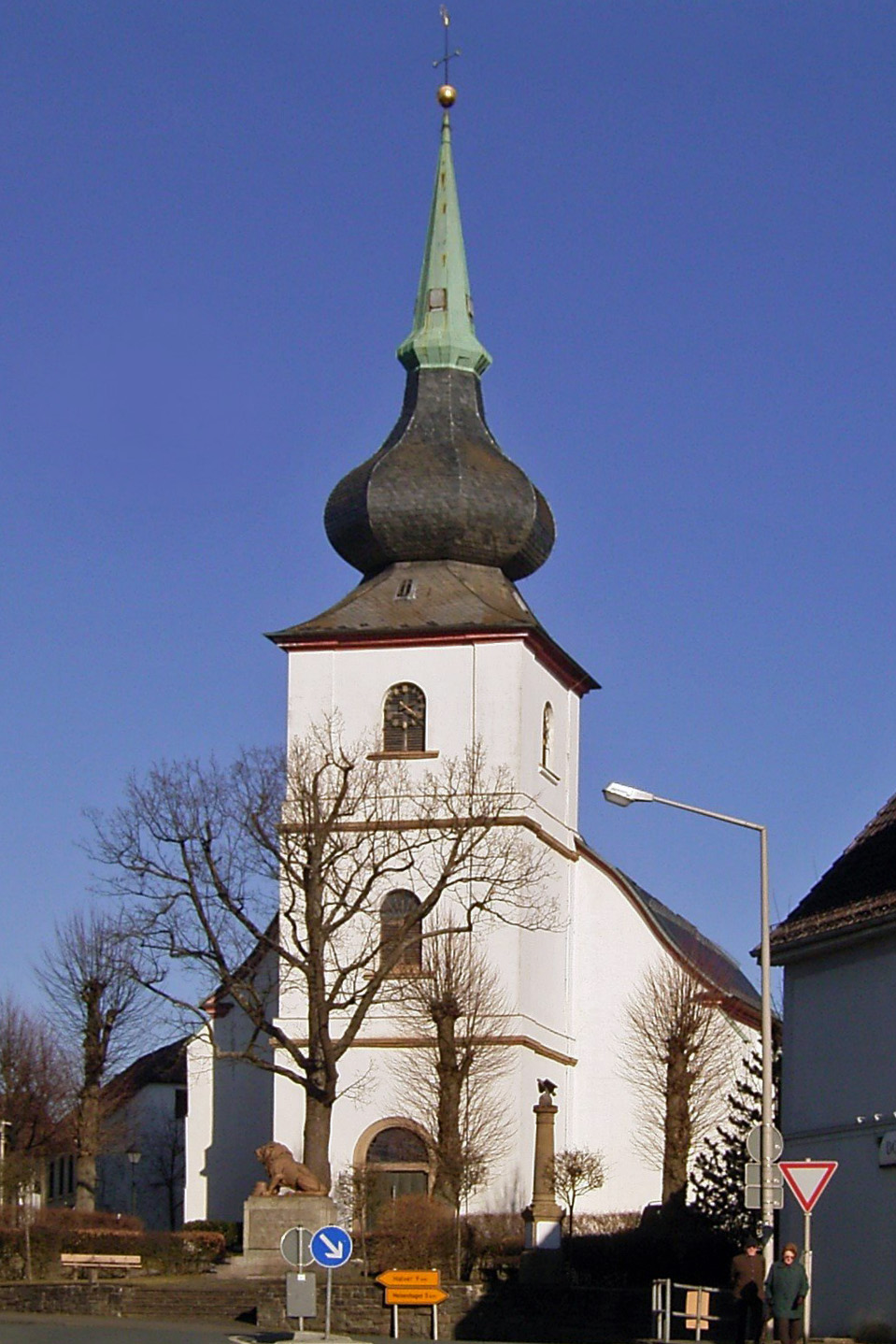
Kierspe - Margarethenkirche (Margarethen church)

Kierspe (German: [ˈkiːɐ̯spə]) is a town in the district Märkischer Kreis, in North Rhine-Westphalia, Germany. It is located at the western edge of the Sauerland on Volme River.

== History ==
The first mention of Kierspe was in 1003, when the castle 'Haus Rhade' was first mentioned in a manuscript. On this basis Kierspe celebrated its 1000th anniversary in 2003. Around 1490 Kierspe became the seat of the Heilige Feme, an independent jury of commoners with the right to mete out the death penalty. Such Feme juries were common in Westphalia at the time.

In 1968, as part of the reorganization of the former district Altena, the city of Kierspe was formed by merging the Amt of Kierspe with the municipality of Rönsahl. On 1 January 1969 Kierspe officially obtained city rights.

== Coat of arms ==
The city's coat of arms was derived from the former coat of arms of the Amt. It combines symbols for both of the member municipalities - Kierspe and Rönsahl - separated by the red-white checkered bar of the counts of the Mark. On the bottom of the coat of arms is a red lion with blue claws and tongue, the symbol of the counts of Berg and taken from the coat of arms of Rönsahl. On the top is a Rauk, a raven. It refers to the nickname given to young recruits, who imitated the sound of the raven when first wearing their blue uniform during mustering. The coat of arms was granted to the Amt on 20 August 1936, and to the city on 29 July 1969. It was designed by Otto Hupp.

The coat of arms of the municipality Kierspe was similar to that of the Amt, except the bottom was a blank yellow field. It was granted on 17 October 1935. The coat of arms of the municipality Rönsahl had Saint Servatius in the top, the patron saint of the church in Rönsahl.

== Population development ==
Historical population

Year	Pop.	±% p.a.
1634	2,570	—
1875	3,513	+0.13%
1905	5,002	+1.18%
1925	6,432	+1.27%
1935	6,899	+0.70%
1950	9,946	+2.47%
1961	10,530	+0.52%
1965	13,368	+6.15%
1970	13,384	+0.02%
1975	13,478	+0.14%

Year	Pop.	±% p.a.
1980	14,436	+1.38%
1985	14,665	+0.32%
1990	16,257	+2.08%
1995	17,541	+1.53%
2000	18,353	+0.91%
2005	18,209	−0.16%
2010	17,270	−1.05%
2015	16,300	−1.15%
2020	16,089	−0.26%
2025	16,192	+0.13%

Source: Landesdatabank Nordrhein-Westfalen (1965-2025)

== International relations ==
Kierspe has been twinned with the French town Montigny-le-Bretonneux since 1988. The partnership developed from a long-lasting student exchange of the Gesamtschule Kierspe with a high school in Montigny-le-Bretonneux.

The town is twinned with Denton, Greater Manchester, which is also twinned with Montigny-le-Bretonneux. A delegation from Denton arrived in April 2012 to discuss the twinning, which eventually took place in a ceremony in Denton on 22 September 2012. There was a large town festival including the planting of a German Linden tree in the town's park.

== Connections with Britain ==
For a number of years the Gesamtschule Kierspe had an English Partnerschule in the form of St. Aidan's C of E High School in Harrogate, and exchanges would take place between British Year 10 pupils studying German and pupils at the Gesamtschule of a similar age. This came to an end in the last few years as St. Aidan's changed its system for teaching modern languages and eschewed the exchange link for a trip to the Rhineland for the Year 9 pupils. However, Year 12s from the school still go to Kierspe for two-week-long work experiences.

== Notable people ==
- Wilhelm Kattwinkel (1866-1935), neurologist and paleontologist
- Roger Schmidt (born 1967), football coach
