= Werdohl =

- Town
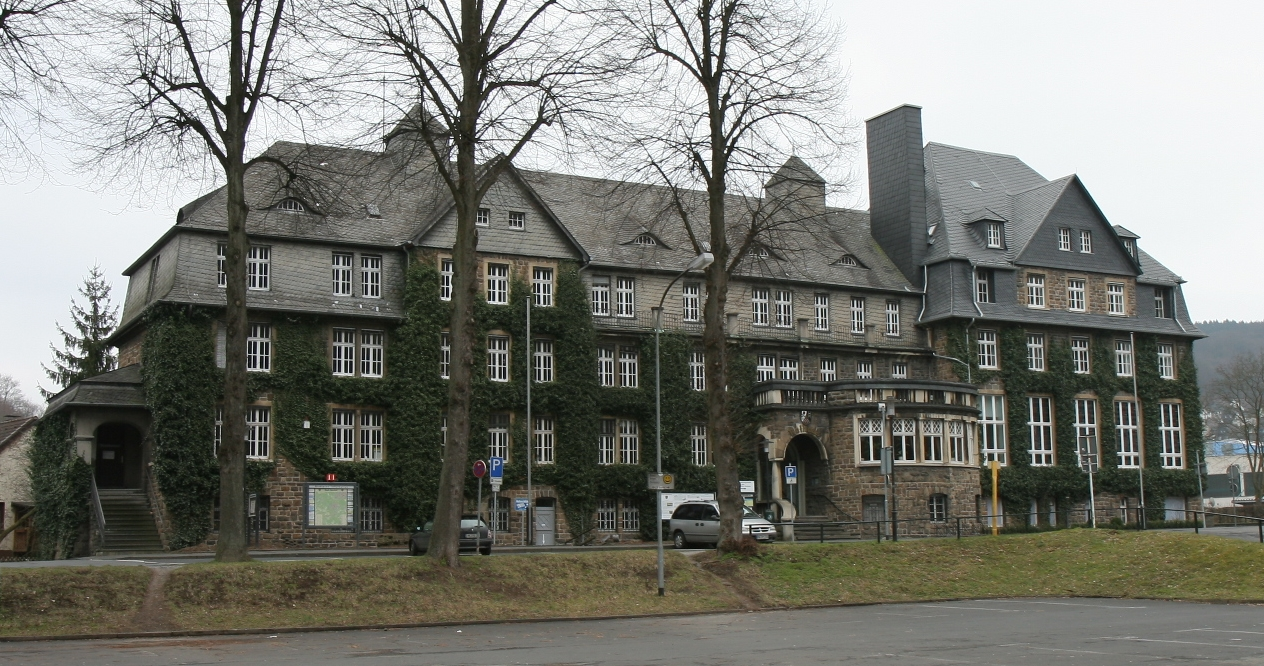
- Town hall

- Flag Coat of arms

- Location of Werdohl within Märkischer Kreis district
- Interactive map of Werdohl
- Location within Germany Location within North Rhine-Westphalia
- Coordinates: 51°16′N 07°46′E
- Country: Germany
- State: North Rhine-Westphalia
- Admin. region: Arnsberg
- District: Märkischer Kreis

Government
  - Mayor (2020–25): Andreas Späinghaus (SPD)

Area
  - Total: 33.38 km^{2} (12.89 sq mi)
- Elevation: 162–448 m (531–1,470 ft)

Population (2025-12-31)
  - Total: 17,500
  - Density: 524/km^{2} (1,360/sq mi)
- Time zone: UTC+01:00 (CET)
  - Summer (DST): UTC+02:00 (CEST)
- Postal codes: 58791
- Dialling codes: 02392
- Vehicle registration: MK
- Website: werdohl.de

Werdohl (German pronunciation: [vɛʁˈdoːl]) is a town in the district Märkischer Kreis, in North Rhine-Westphalia, Germany.

== Geography ==
Werdohl is located in the hills of the Sauerland, at a double meander of the river Lenne and its confluent, the Verse. The highest elevation is the Hölzerne Klinke with 448.8m above sea level, the lowest is in valley of Lenne at the boundary to the city Altena with 162m. Werdohl shares borders with (clockwise) Altena, Neuenrade, Plettenberg, Herscheid and Lüdenscheid. A large part of the area, about 19.2 km^{2}, is meadows and forests and is used for agriculture and forestry, followed by 3.18 km^{2} of residential areas and 1.24 km^{2} are commercial and industrial areas.

=== Urban districts ===
The city centre is located at the banks of the river Lenne and at the foot of surrounding hills. The townships are Versevörde, where the river Verse flows into the river Lenne, Königsburg, Rodt and Erlhagen.

Kettling lies upstream of the Lenne at the border to Plettenberg. Ütterlingsen, Dresel and Elverlingsen are downstream of the Lenne towards the border to Altena.

Following the Verse from upstream from Versevörde to Lüdenscheid, the townships Osmecke, Pungelscheid, Kleinhammer, Eveking, Bärenstein and Oberborbecke are located upstream in the valley of the Verse (Versetal) or on the hills forming the valley.

== History ==
The first document which mentions Werdohl dates to the year 1101. Bishop Heinrich II. from Paderborn mentions the church of Werdohl, which was donated by count Erpo of Padberg to the monastery Boke/Flechtdorf. In 1220 the Priorat Berentrop took over the ownership, which in 1300 was bought by count Everhard II. of the Mark.

Werdohl was long administered in the Amt Neuenrade, however at the end of the 19th century the population of Werdohl was higher than those of the other municipalities in the Amt together. On June 1, 1891 Werdohl left the Amt and became self-administered, after it failed to get the seat of the Amt administration to be moved to Werdohl. On April 19, 1936 the municipality received city rights.

== Population ==
Historical population

Year	Pop.	±% p.a.
1965	23,873	—
1970	24,226	+0.29%
1975	21,966	−1.94%
1980	21,657	−0.28%
1985	20,275	−1.31%
1990	21,875	+1.53%
1995	22,227	+0.32%

Year	Pop.	±% p.a.
2000	21,479	−0.68%
2005	20,177	−1.24%
2010	18,706	−1.50%
2015	18,002	−0.76%
2020	17,660	−0.38%
2025	17,500	−0.18%

Source: Landesdatabank Nordrhein-Westfalen

== Coat of arms ==
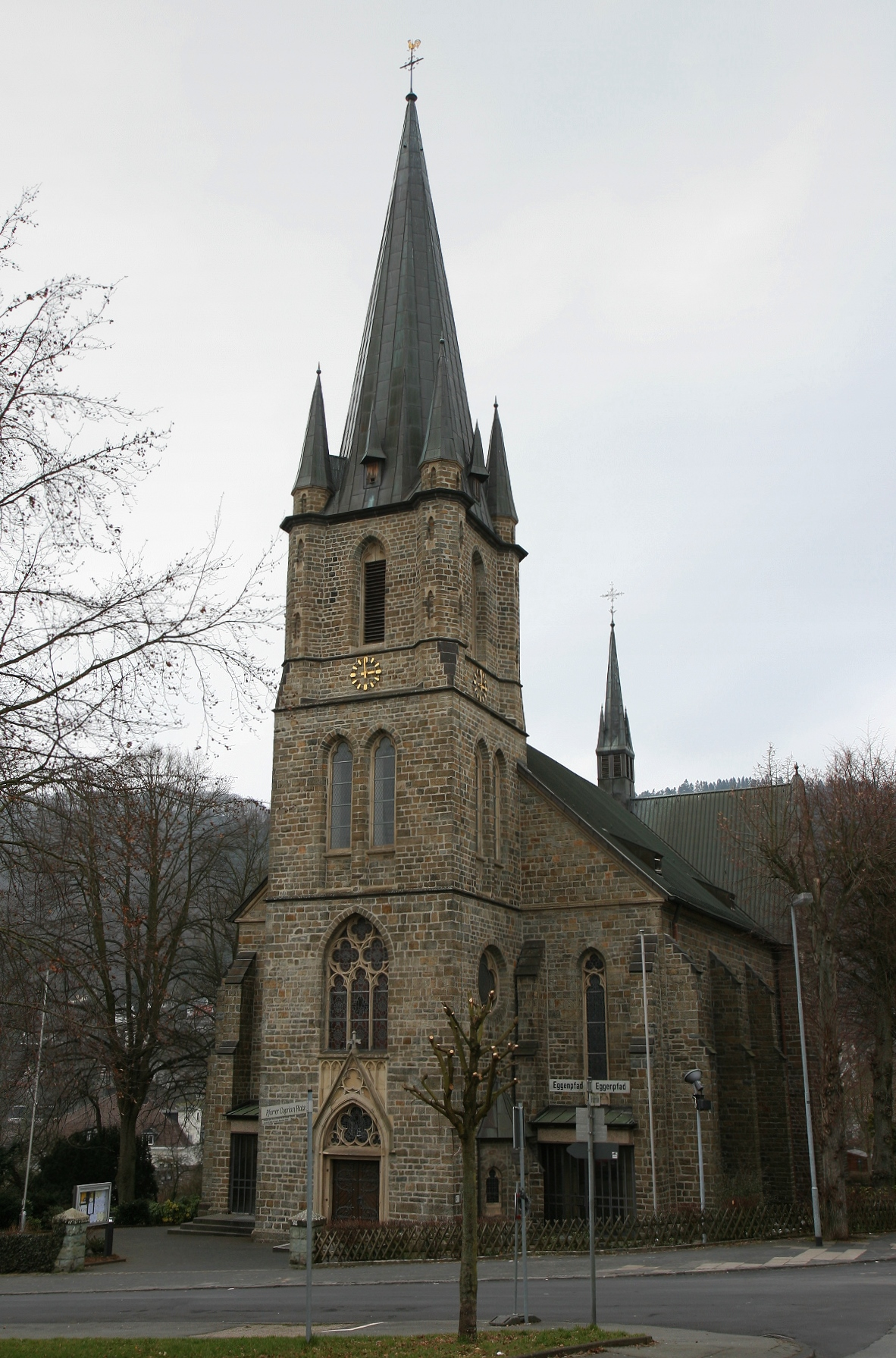
Church St Michael

The coat of arms of Werdohl shows a rose, which was already present in the seal of the church. To the right are three chain segments, the symbol of the family Neuhoff, a noble family which resided in the municipality in the past. The bottom part shows the red-white chequered bordure as the symbols of the counts of the Mark.

The first attempt of Werdohl to receive a coat of arms was started in 1915, when they asked Dr. Hildebrandt of the editorial staff of the Deutscher Herold in Berlin to create a concept for a coat of arms. The draft already resembled the later coat of arms, only the rose was in silver on black ground. However the war and then the end of monarchy in Germany delayed for several years. In 1929 Otto Hupp created two drafts of the coat of arms, one of which was then accepted by the municipality council on August 29, 1929. It later turned out that the coat of arms need to be officially granted, which happened on January 16, 1935.

In 1936 the Landrat of Westphalia lobbied to have the coat of arms changed. He requested a draft from the heraldic Waldemar Mallek, which showed a Zeppelin in the top part, the chain in bottom, separated by the chequered bordure. It was however not accepted by the mayor of Werdohl, and was not pursued further.

== Economy ==
Amongst the biggest employers headquartered in Werdohl are Schaeffler Engineering, a company of Schaeffler Group, nickel alloy producer VDM Metals and the technology company Vossloh, market leader for rail fasteners and switch systems.

== International relations ==
Werdohl is twinned with: Since April 6, 1975 Werdohl has a city partnership with the English district Derwentside. Since August 10, 1990 it has a partnership with the city Stavenhagen in Mecklenburg-Western Pomerania.
