= Schalksmühle =

- Municipality
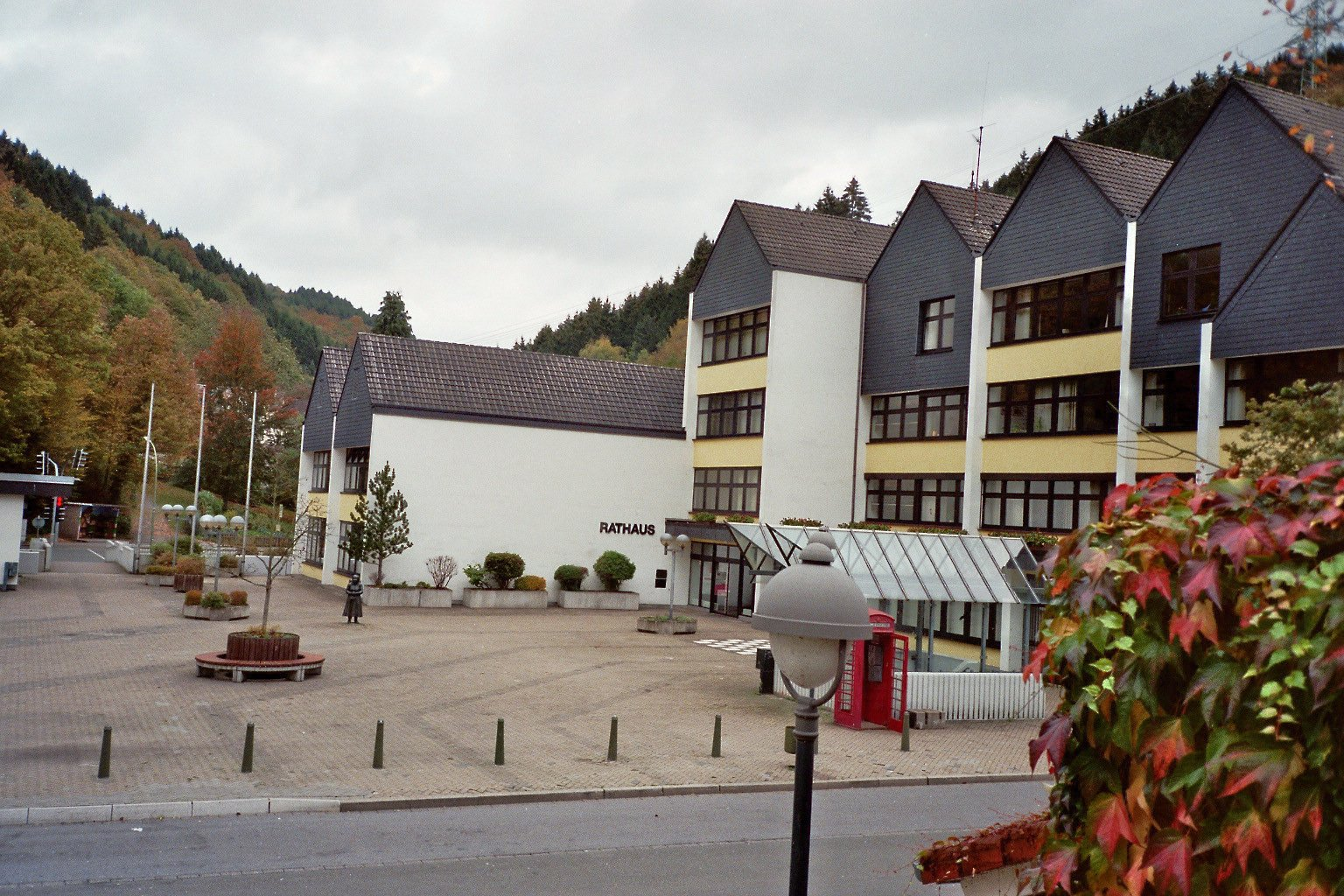
- Townhall in Schalksmühle

- Coat of arms

- Location of Schalksmühle within Märkischer Kreis district
- Interactive map of Schalksmühle
- Location within Germany Location within North Rhine-Westphalia
- Coordinates: 51°13′N 07°31′E
- Country: Germany
- State: North Rhine-Westphalia
- Admin. region: Arnsberg
- District: Märkischer Kreis
- Subdivisions: 15

Government
  - Mayor (2020–25): Jörg Schönenberg

Area
  - Total: 38.09 km^{2} (14.71 sq mi)
- Elevation: 183–502 m (600–1,647 ft)

Population (2025-12-31)
  - Total: 10,376
  - Density: 272.4/km^{2} (705.5/sq mi)
- Time zone: UTC+01:00 (CET)
  - Summer (DST): UTC+02:00 (CEST)
- Postal codes: 58579
- Dialling codes: 02355, 02351 (Heedfeld, Winkeln), 02337 (Albringwerde, Rölvede)
- Vehicle registration: MK (old: AL, LÜD, LS, EN)
- Website: www.schalksmuehle.de

Schalksmühle (German pronunciation: [ˈʃalksˌmyːlə]; Westphalian: Schalksmüehle) is a municipality in district Märkischer Kreis, in North Rhine-Westphalia, Germany. It is the town with the highest rate of millionaires relating to the population in North Rhine-Westphalia (2004).

== Geography ==
Schalksmühle is located in the hills of the Sauerland, and the altitude of the 38.2 km² area varies between 183 m (Pulvermühle) and 502 m (east of Sonnenscheid) above sea level. 45% of the area is covered by forest, another 35% is used for agricultural purposes. The main river is the Volme, a tributary of the Ruhr.

== History ==
The oldest written documents on the municipality date back to 1350, when the farmers of Hülscheid formed a free duchy. The largest extent of the Freigrafschaft Hülscheid was in 1478, when it contained not only the Kirchspiel Hülscheid, but also the northwestern part of the Kirchspiel Lüdenscheid.

Schalksmühle itself was first mentioned on May 1, 1407 in a document by archbishop Friedrich of Cologne, when Gerwin of Altenbreckerfeld, a merchant, donated an altar to the church of Breckerfeld. One of the villages leased by Gerwin was Schalksmollen in parrochia Halvere (Schalksmühle in the parish Halver).

The municipality in its modern boundaries was created during the communal reforms of 1969/70. Becoming effective on January 1, 1969 the municipality Schalksmühle was merged with the municipality Hülscheid (previously in the Amt Lüdenscheid). On January 1, 1970 the municipality Dahlerbrück (previously in the Amt Breckerfeld, district Ennepe-Ruhr) was also added to it.

== Population ==
Historical population

Year	Pop.	±% p.a.
1965	10,415	—
1970	10,915	+0.94%
1975	11,174	+0.47%
1980	11,303	+0.23%
1985	11,273	−0.05%
1990	12,232	+1.65%
1995	12,218	−0.02%

Year	Pop.	±% p.a.
2000	12,121	−0.16%
2005	11,813	−0.51%
2010	11,135	−1.18%
2015	10,528	−1.11%
2020	10,287	−0.46%
2025	10,376	+0.17%

Source: Landesdatabank Nordrhein-Westfalen

== Coat of arms ==
The coat of arms combined the symbols of the two municipalities merged in 1969. The top part shows the upper half of a black mill wheel (Mühle is German for mill), the symbol for Schalksmühle. In the bottom are three leaves of European Holly (Ilex aquifolium), which was taken from the coat of arms of the municipality Hülscheid. As no traditional symbols were found for Hülscheid a "talking symbol" was chosen - Hülsebusch is one of several traditional German names of the Ilex. The two symbols are separated by a red-and-white chequered bordure as the symbol of the counts of the Mark. The coat of arms was granted on July 21, 1970.

Before 1969 the coat of arms of the municipality was very similar to the current one, except that the bottom part of the shield was a simple golden field. That coat of arms was granted on March 29, 1935. The coat of arms of the municipality of Hülscheid had the Ilex leaves instead of the mill wheel in top. That coat of arms was granted on January 16, 1935. Both were designed by Otto Hupp, based on an idea of Fritz Thomée, former Landrat of the district Altena.

== Economy ==
The economy of Schalkmühle is determined by companies of the electrical business: Berker GmbH & Co. KG, Rutenbeck Fernmeldetechnik (Gebäude-Kommunikationstechnik), Albrecht Jung GmbH & Co. KG, Lumberg GmbH & Co. KG, Günther Spelsberg GmbH + Co.KG, Kaiser GmbH & Co. KG and Busch-Jaeger Elektro GmbH & Co. KG.

== Twin towns ==
Schalksmühle is twinned with two towns. Since July 1987 it has had a partnership with Ruhla in Thuringia (at that time in East Germany). Since 1970 it has had a partnership with the English district of Wansbeck in Northumberland. This originated when a young man (Klaus Floeren) from Iserlohn worked for some time in the town of Bedlington and met his future wife (Muriel Binks) there.

After moving to Schalksmühle with their young son Rolf, the couple suggested a partnership between the two communities. When Bedlington town council was merged with Ashington and Newbiggin-by-the-Sea to form the district of Wansbeck, the partnership was continued by the new district council.

One of the roads in Bedlington is named Schalksmühle road
