= Märkischer Kreis =

Coordinates: 51°13′30″N 7°36′52″E

- District
- Flag Coat of arms
- Country: Germany
- State: North Rhine-Westphalia
- Adm. region: Arnsberg
- Capital: Lüdenscheid

Government
  - District admin.: Ralf Schwarzkopf (CDU)

Area
  - Total: 1,058.95 km^{2} (408.86 sq mi)

Population (31 December 2024)
  - Total: 408,046
  - Density: 385.331/km^{2} (998.002/sq mi)
- Time zone: UTC+01:00 (CET)
  - Summer (DST): UTC+02:00 (CEST)
- Vehicle registration: MK
- Website: http://www.maerkischer-kreis.de

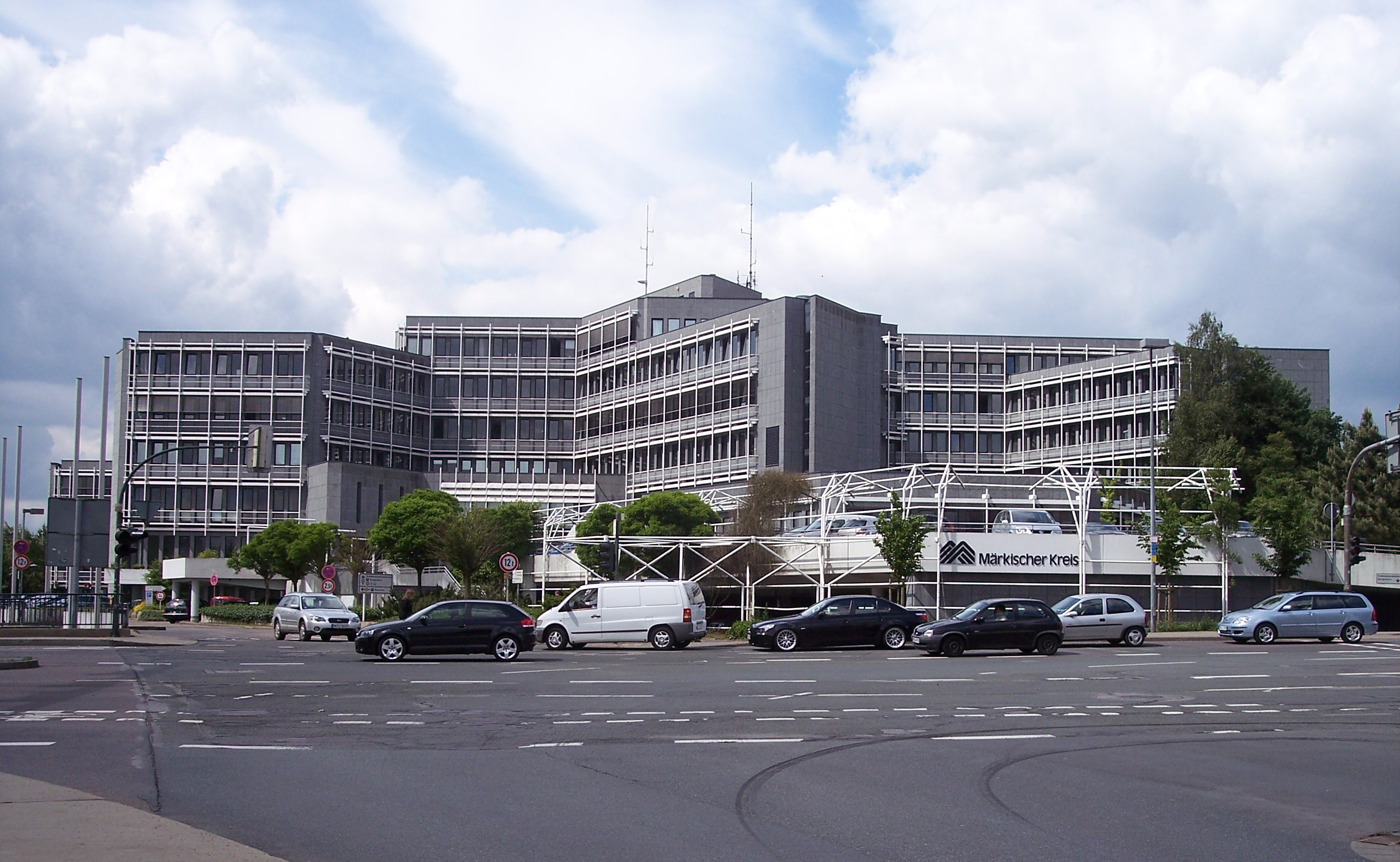
Kreishaus MK

The Märkischer Kreis (German pronunciation: [ˌmɛʁkɪʃɐ ˈkʁaɪs], lit. 'Markian District') is a district (Kreis) in central North Rhine-Westphalia, Germany. Neighbouring districts are Unna, Soest, Hochsauerland, Olpe, Oberbergischer Kreis, Ennepe-Ruhr, and the city of Hagen.

== History ==
The district was created in 1975 as part of the reorganization of North Rhine-Westphalian districts. The former districts of Lüdenscheid and Iserlohn, previously an urban district, plus the area around Balve (previously part of Arnsberg District) were amalgamated to form the new district. Lüdenscheid District itself had been created just a few years earlier, in 1968, when the city of Lüdenscheid was merged with Altena District (originally created in 1753). The name Märkischer Kreis was chosen in recognition of the fact that most of its territory formerly belonged to the county of the Mark.

== Twinning ==
Twinning with Wrexham County Borough (Wales, United Kingdom) dates from 1970 and was initiated by the precursor district, Iserlohn.

In 1992 a twinning agreement was reached with the Finsterwalde District of Brandenburg, unofficial relations between the two districts having existed since German reunification in 1990. Following Finsterwald's merger with the district of Elbe-Elster, twinning with the new district was reconfirmed in 1996.

In 2001 a twinning agreement was officially established with the district of Racibórz, in southern Poland.

Since 2023, Märkischer Kreis also has a twinning with County Waterford in Ireland.

== Geography ==
The Märkischer Kreis covers the northwestern part of the Sauerland mountains, south of the Ruhr valley. The highest point, at 663 metres above sea level, is the Nordhelle. The district's principal river is the Lenne, another river is the Hönne. Although most of the district is covered by forest and is rather sparsely inhabited, the area has had a long industrial history: it was, in fact, the very abundance of timber in the area which made steel-working possible here long before Ruhr coal became readily available.

== Coat of arms ==
The lion and fess chequy are taken from the old coat of arms of the district of Altena, which derived from the arms of the Counts of the Mark. In the first half of the 13th century a seal with both the fess and the lion was in use, as first used by Adolf I of Altena (1199–1241). Engelbert I of the Mark (1249–1277) removed the lion in his seal. The original colour of the lion was unknown, so a black lion with red tongue and claws was chosen, as in the arms of the Dukes of Jülich. The black cross comes from the arms of Cologne, as the eastern part of the area historically belonged to the Electorate of Cologne.

The coat of arms was designed by the herald Waldemar Mallek, and was granted on 6 May 1976.

== Towns and municipalities ==
Clickable map of towns and municipalities in the district

Cities (population)
1. Altena (20,997)
2. Balve (12,200)
3. Halver (17,550)
4. Hemer (37,790)
5. Iserlohn (102,456)
6. Kierspe (18,313)

7. Lüdenscheid (79,131)
8. Meinerzhagen (21,823)
9. Menden (58,184)
10. Neuenrade (12,402)
11. Plettenberg (28,149)
12. Werdohl (20,333)
Municipalities (population)
1. Herscheid (7,617)
2. Nachrodt-Wiblingwerde (6,856)
3. Schalksmühle (12,257)

== Politics and administration ==
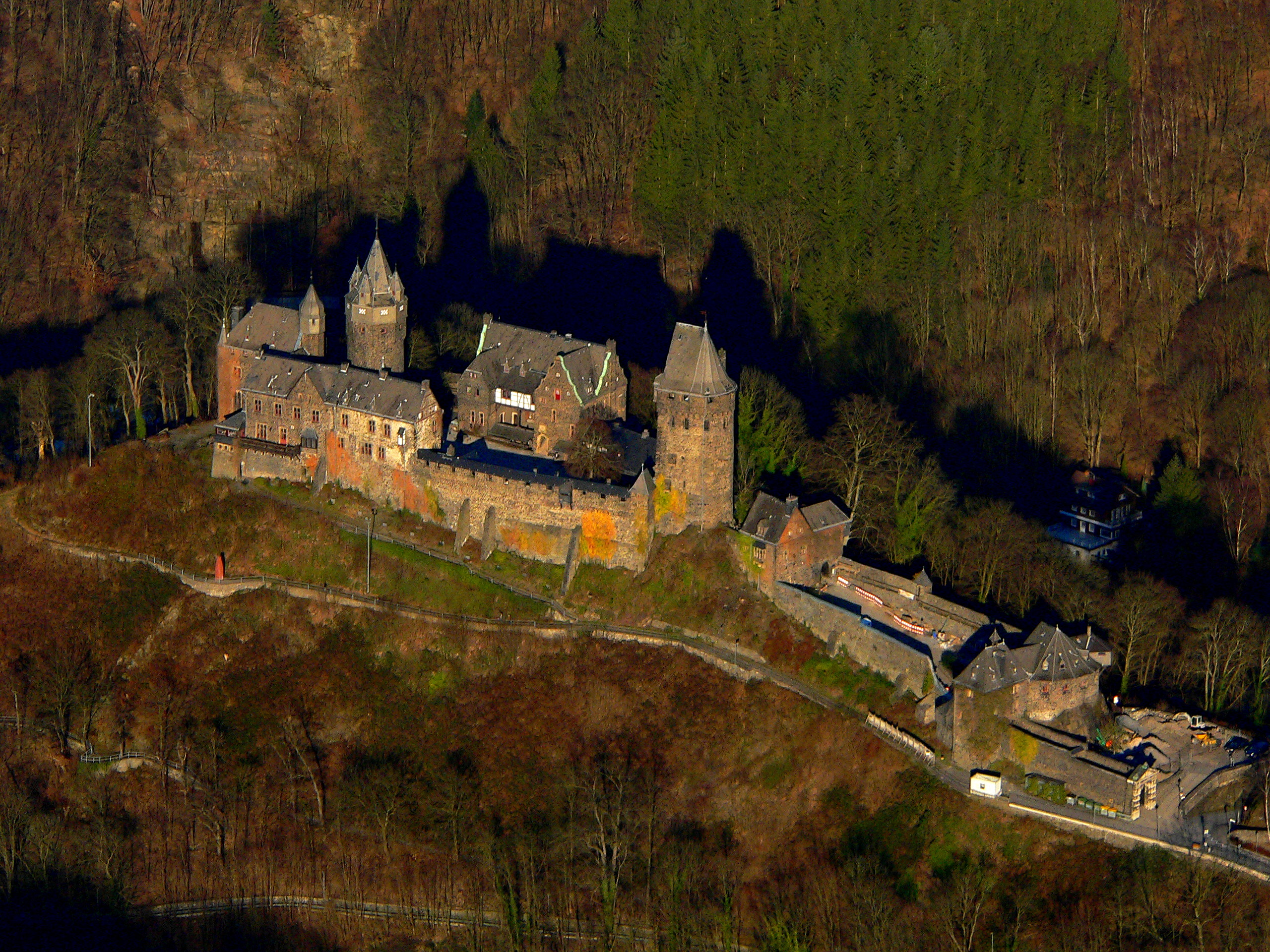
Castle in Altena

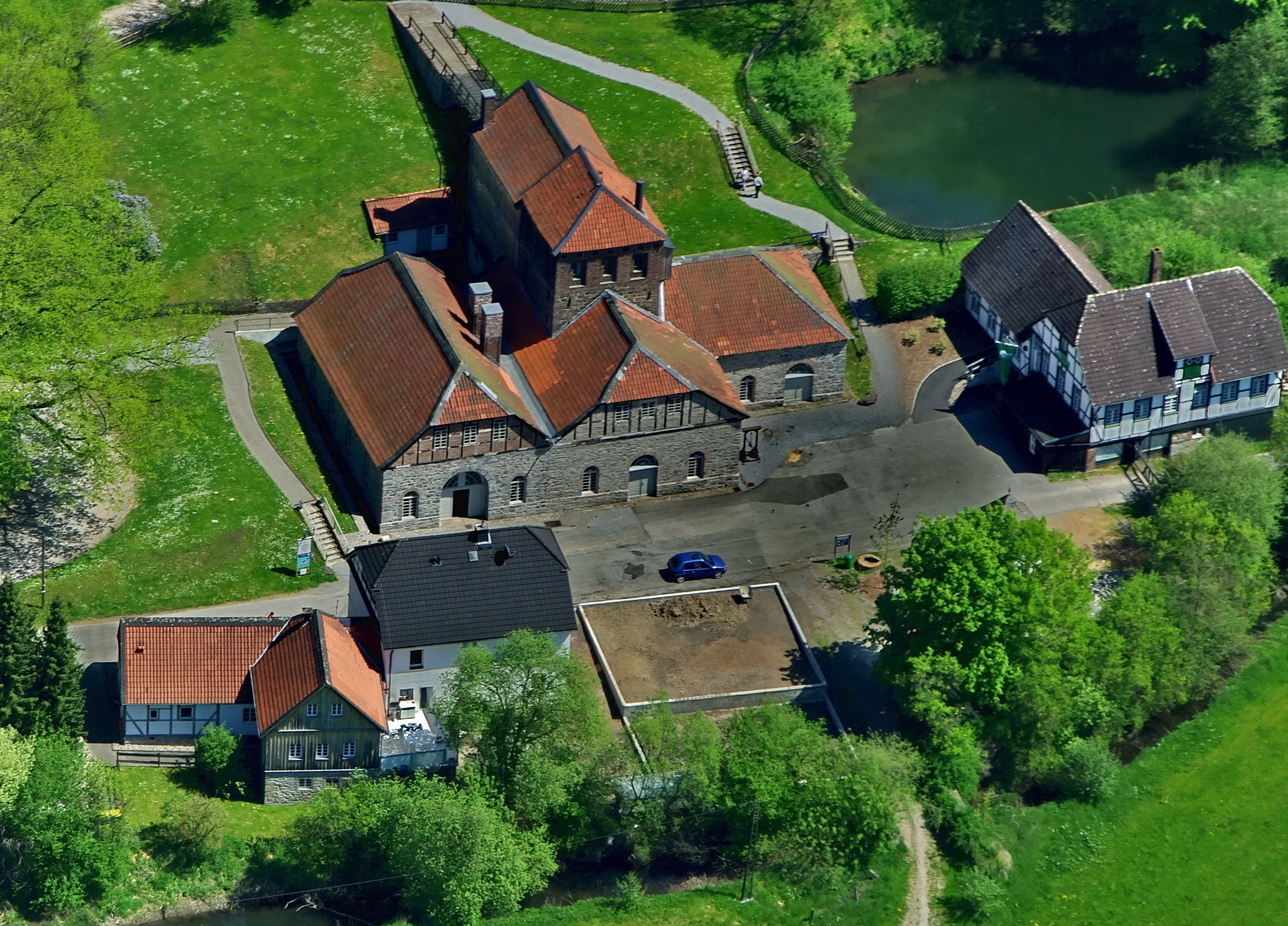
Luisenhütte

The district is led by a Landrat. Originally the Landrat was only a representative post, while the Oberkreisdirektor was the head of the administration; however, since 1999 the two posts have been unified. The headquarters of the administration of the county are located in Lüdenscheid, but there are county halls with parts of the administration in Iserlohn and Altena, too. The police headquarters of the county are in Iserlohn.

Landrat
- Heinz Bickmann (CDU) - 1975 (provisional)
- Dr. Walter Hostert (CDU) - 1975-1994
- Klaus Tweer (SPD) - 1994-1999
- Aloys Steppuhn (CDU) - 1999-2009
- Thomas Gemke (CDU) - 2009-2020
- Marco Voge (CDU) - 2020-2025
- Ralf Schwarzkopf (CDU) - since 2025
Oberkreisdirektor
- Wilfried Droste (SPD) - 1975 (provisional)
- Dr. Jürgen Albath (CDU) - 1975-1986
- Dr. Bernhard Schneider (CDU) - 1986-1999

The county council meets in the county hall in Iserlohn. Its last election was on 26 September 2004.

Party	Votes	Seats
CDU	44.4%	32
SPD	30.0%	22
Greens	7.7%	6
FDP	7.4%	5
Independent (UWG)	6.7%	5
NPD	1.9%	1
Republican	1.8%	1

== Culture ==
From 1970 to 2005 the Märkischer Kreis hosted an international Jazzfestival. Since 2002 the cave in Balve is the home of the Irish Folk & Celtic Music festival. Since 1991 the Balver Maerchenwochen are organized by the Festspiele Balver Höhle.

The Luisenhütte is an industrial monument in Balve.
