= Dagmar Freitag =

German politician

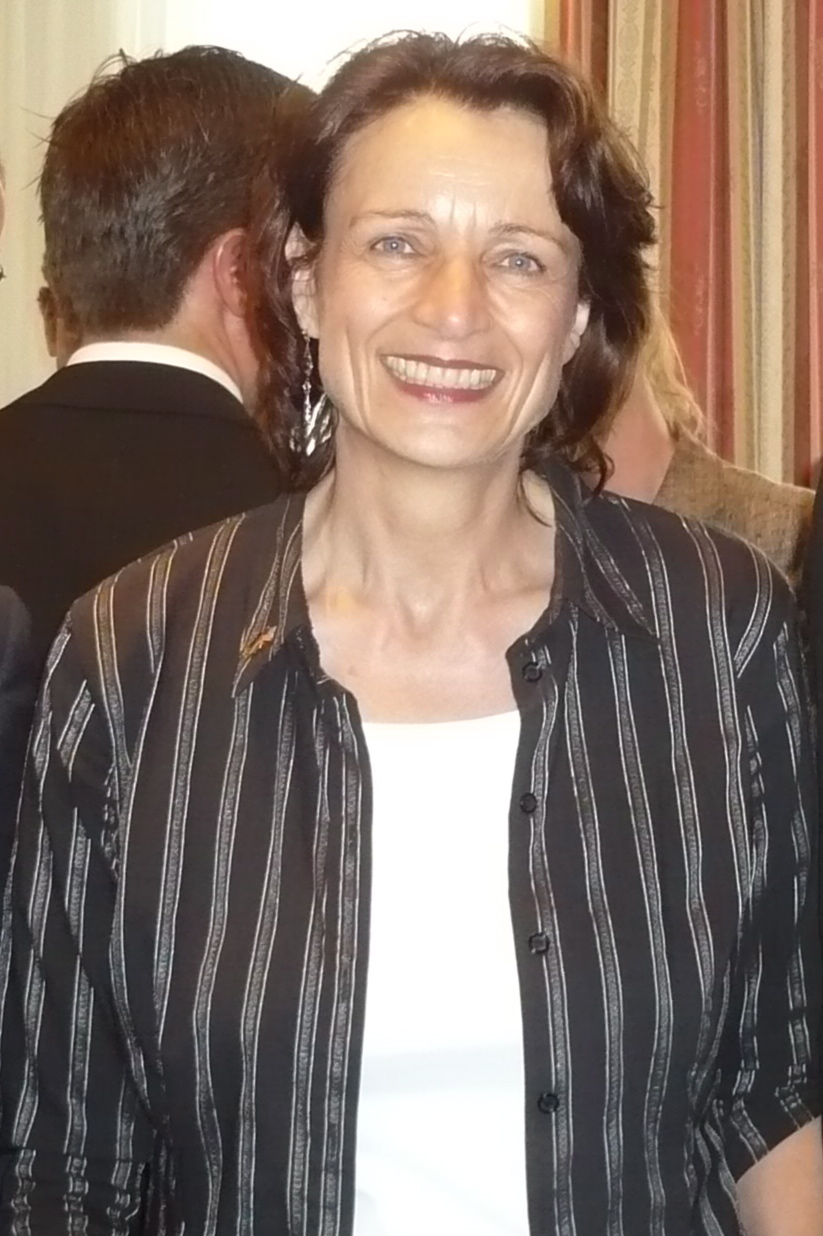
- Dagmar Freitag in 2008

Member of the Bundestag
- In office 1994–2021
- Preceded by: Cornelia Yzer

Personal details
- Born: 3 March 1953 (age 73) Iserlohn, West Germany (now Germany)
- Party: SPD
- Education: Ruhr University Bochum

Dagmar Freitag (born 3 March 1953) is a German teacher and politician of the Social Democratic Party (SPD) who served as a member of the Bundestag from the state of North Rhine-Westphalia from 1994 to 2021.

== Early life and career ==
After graduating from the Gymnasium Hohenlimburg in 1972, Freitag studied English language and literature and sports science at Ruhr University Bochum, which she completed in 1977 with the first state examination for teaching at secondary schools. She passed the second state examination in 1980 and worked as a teacher at the Wilhelm-Busch-Realschule in Schwerte. In 1992 she changed to the municipal comprehensive school in Schwerte.

== Political career ==
Freitag first became a member of the Bundestag in the 1994 German federal election. Throughout her time in parliament, she was a member of the Sports Committee, which she has chaired from 2014. In 2009, she also joined the Committee on Foreign Affairs.

Within her parliamentary group, Freitag served as part of the leadership team around chairman Peter Struck from 2005 until 2009. From 2014 until 2018, she also chaired an internal working group on relations with North America. From 2014, she was her group's deputy spokesperson on foreign policy.

In addition to her committee assignments, Freitag was a member of the German-American Parliamentary Friendship Group – which she chaired from 2016 until 2018 – and of the German delegation to the NATO Parliamentary Assembly (since 2014).

Ahead of the 2009 elections, German foreign minister Frank-Walter Steinmeier included Freitag in his shadow cabinet of 10 women and eight men for the Social Democrats’ campaign to unseat Chancellor Angela Merkel.

In October 2020, Freitag announced that she would not stand in the 2021 federal elections but instead retire from active politics by the end of the parliamentary term.

== Other activities ==
- Deutsche Welle, Member of the Broadcasting Council (since 2014)
- National Anti Doping Agency Germany (NADA), Member of the Supervisory Board
- German Sport University Cologne (DSHS), Member of the University Council (-2017)
- German Athletics Association (DLV), Vice-President (-2017)
- German Animal Welfare Federation, Member
