= Hagen-Rummenohl =

Quarter of Hagen (Westfalen), Germany

Coordinates: 51°16′42″N 7°31′44″E

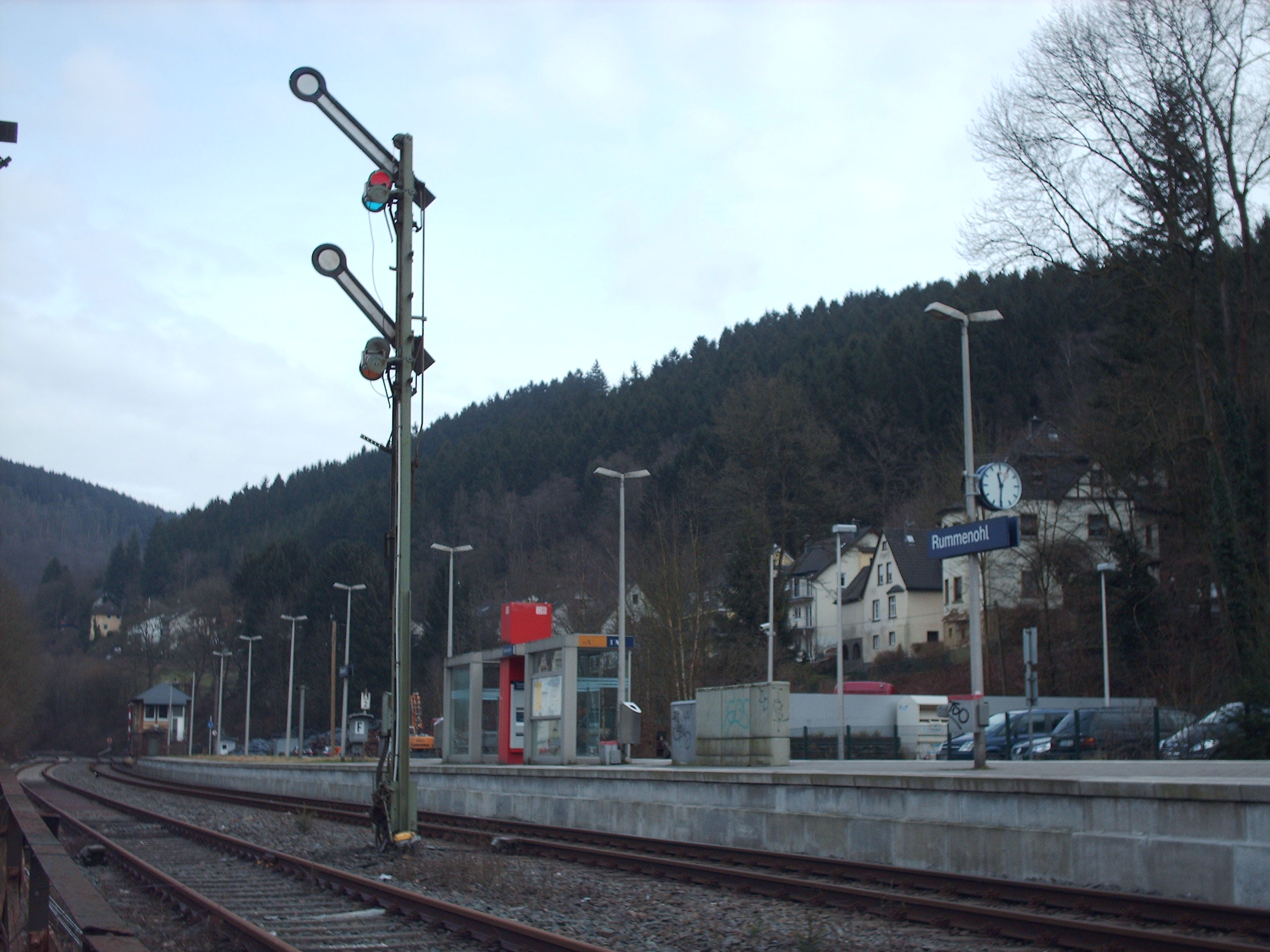
Rummenohl station

Rummenohl, now officially Hagen-Rummenohl, is a locality within the independent city of Hagen in the eastern part of the Ruhr region, in Germany. It lies in the valley of the river Volme, about 13 km upstream (south) of the city centre of Hagen.

== History ==
The former independent settlement of Dahl, consisting of Dahl, Priorei and Rummenohl, was incorporated in 1970 into the town of Breckerfeld in the district (Kreis) of Ennepe-Ruhr. In 1975, the Parliament of the state of North Rhine-Westphalia decided to transfer it to the metropolitan district of Hagen.

=== Industrial history ===
Rummenohl has for centuries been a centre of ironworking, using the power of the river Volme to process iron ore from the Siegerland. The opening on 16 March 1874 of the single-track Volmetalbahn, which made a connection for goods traffic to Brügge (Lüdenscheid) and beyond that to Meinerzhagen, improved its integration into the developing Ruhr. Goods traffic to Lüdenscheid via Brügge was discontinued in early 1996.

In the early 1870s, Alfred Nobel founded a factory in Rummenohl to manufacture dynamite. On 5 June 1910 it was struck by lightning and exploded.

Beginning in 1908, gunpowder was manufactured in the valley of the Sterbecke, which flows into the Volme in Rummenohl. In peacetime, 100 people worked there; during World War I, the number rose to over 2,000. In wartime, the factory primarily produced landmines, cartridges and charges for grenades; after the war, it once more produced explosives for road construction and mining. A spur railway connected the distant factory on the heights near Selkinghausen to the Volmetal-Bahn railway line, negotiating the difference in height by means of several switchbacks. Beginning in 1926, the factory was gradually closed down. After World War II, the buildings served as accommodations for bombing victims and refugees. The building was torn down in the 1960s in the course of construction of the A45 Autobahn.

In 1918, a new church was built. The grain mill and former smithy at Krummewiese, on the northern edge of Rummenohl, which had been in operation since 1824, was shut down in 1952.
