= Haspe–Voerde–Breckerfeld Light Railway =

Railway line in Germany

Coordinates: 51°18′02″N 7°24′18″E

The Haspe–Voerde–Breckerfeld Light Railway (German: Kleinbahn Haspe-Voerde-Breckerfeld) was a narrow-gauge railway linking the towns of Breckerfeld and Voerde with the Elberfeld–Dortmund railway at Haspe. Construction lasted from 1901 to 1906. The original owners were:

- The country of Prussia
- The Provinzialverband of Westphalia
- Voerde, formerly a municipality; now belongs to Ennepetal

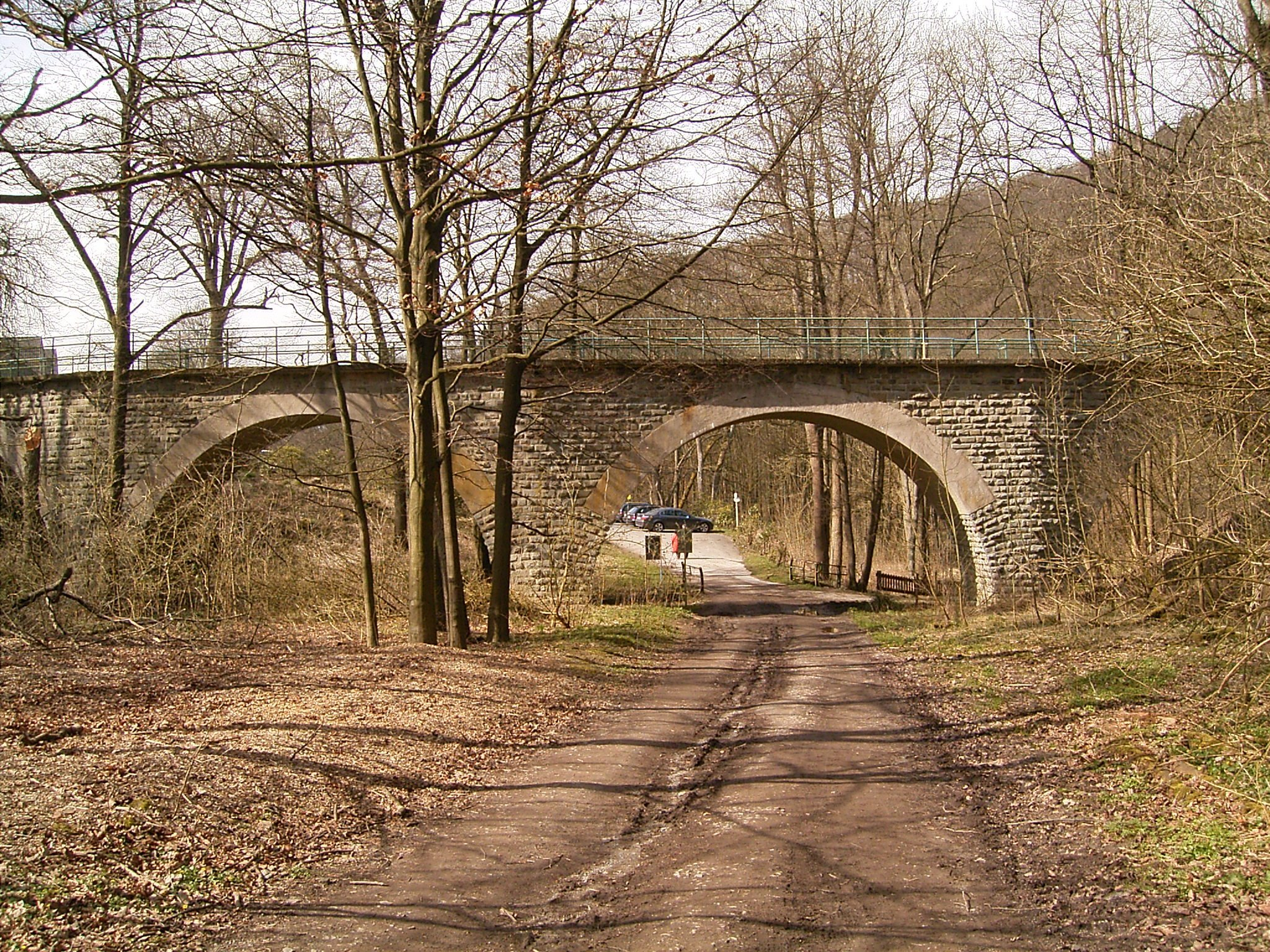
Plessen viaduct near Haspe dam

This narrow-gauge railway was 18.39 km (11.43 mi) long and ran 2.4 km (1.5 mi) over publicly owned roads. The majority of the span was sub-graded. The line's most important role was the provision of goods services in the valley of Hasperbach and from the Breckerfeld plateau. For this purpose, standard gauge freight wagons were put onto narrow gauge transporter wagons. One of the locomotives is preserved and operates on the Blonay-Chamby museum railway, in Switzerland.

After World War I, the company went into financial crisis and had to suspend passenger services in 1921 due to the economic downturn. The assets were bought by the streetcar company of the city of Hagen in 1927. The railway was then electrified, using 1200 V DC, and passenger and freight services were opened again. In 1954 freight services were suspended, and in 1963 the last passenger service was stopped.

Today only the station at Breckerfeld, the viaduct below the Haspe dam, the locomotive shed and the transformer works at Hagen-Haspe by the shooting range are left. The trackbed is now largely used as a walking route and cycle path. The inclines do not exceed 3% at any point, so it is a very comfortable route for those cycling from the Ruhrgebiet into the Sauerland.

The route of the Kleinbahn was one of the most picturesque rural railway lines in Germany. It runs out of the narrow valley of the Hasperbach with a horseshoe curve near the Haspe Dam and a reversing station at Voerde onto the broad plateau of Breckerfeld, that dominates the surrounding area at a height of 350 m above sea level.
