= Hagen-Dahl =

Locality in Hagen, Ruhr, Germany

Coordinates: 51°18′17″N 7°31′55″E

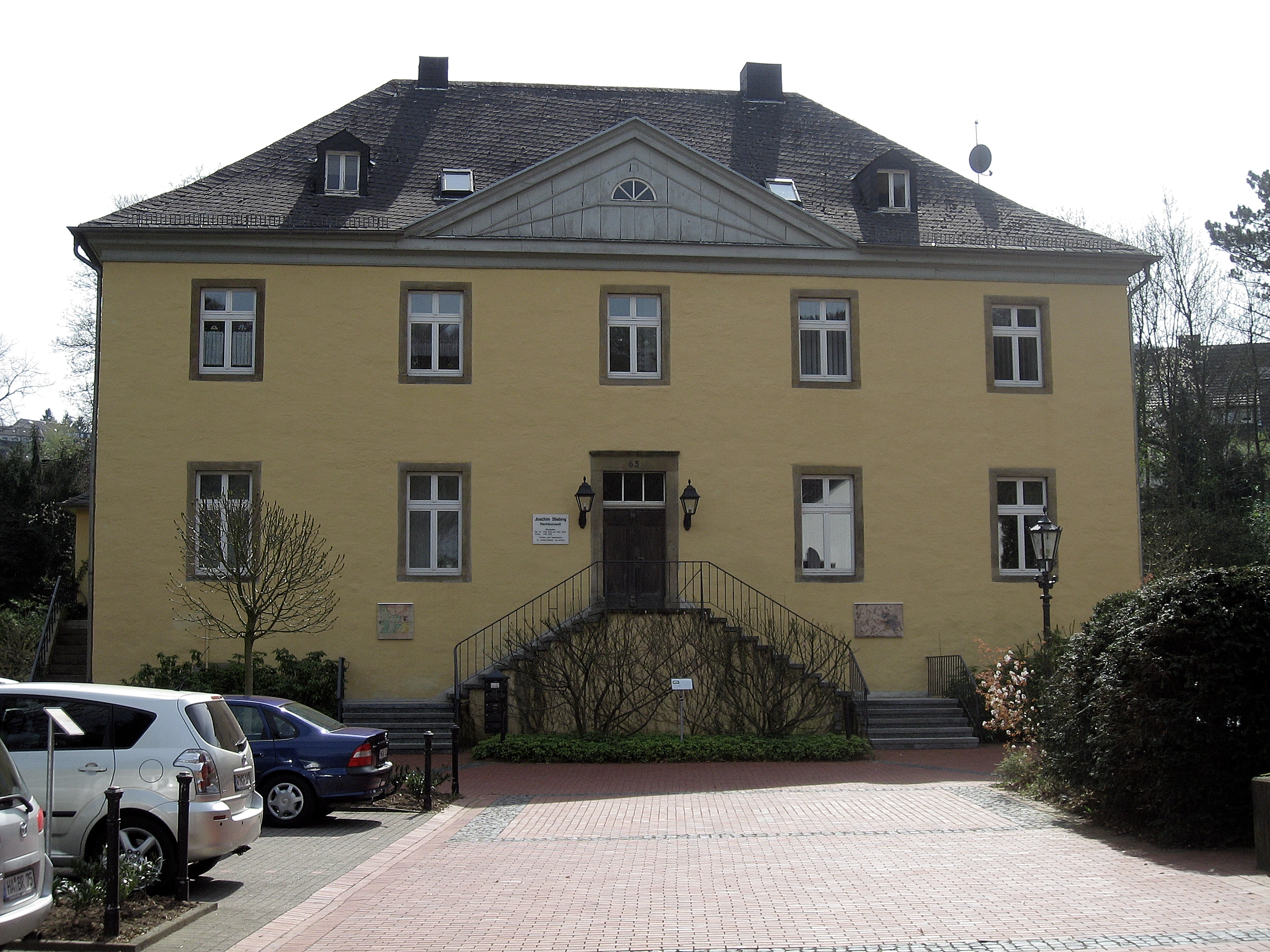
Haus Dahl (1823)

Dahl, now officially Hagen-Dahl, is a locality within the independent city of Hagen in the southeastern Ruhr, in Germany. It was incorporated into Hagen in 1975 together with Rummenohl and Priorei.

== History ==
=== Prehistory ===
The remains of an old hill fort, Ambrock, have been found under a farm in Dahl (previously in Delstern), the Ribberthof (formerly Unter-Ambrock; the farm was renamed in the 19th century to honor the chief donor to the Ambrock Clinic, which is located on the grounds of the former Ober-Ambrock farm). This indicates that it was a fortified encampment sometime in pre-Carolingian times, that is, prior to the 9th century. Two archaeological digs have not uncovered enough finds for a definite dating, but uninterpreted runic inscriptions found in material re-used for the construction of the farm indicate great age. The two estates of Ober- and Unter-Ambrock are mentioned in early mediaeval sources.

The earliest written mention of a location in Dahl is a 1050 deed of gift to Werden Abbey mentioning the estate of Rumenscetha (Rumscheid) and its owner, Aeluekin.

=== 1200–1800 ===
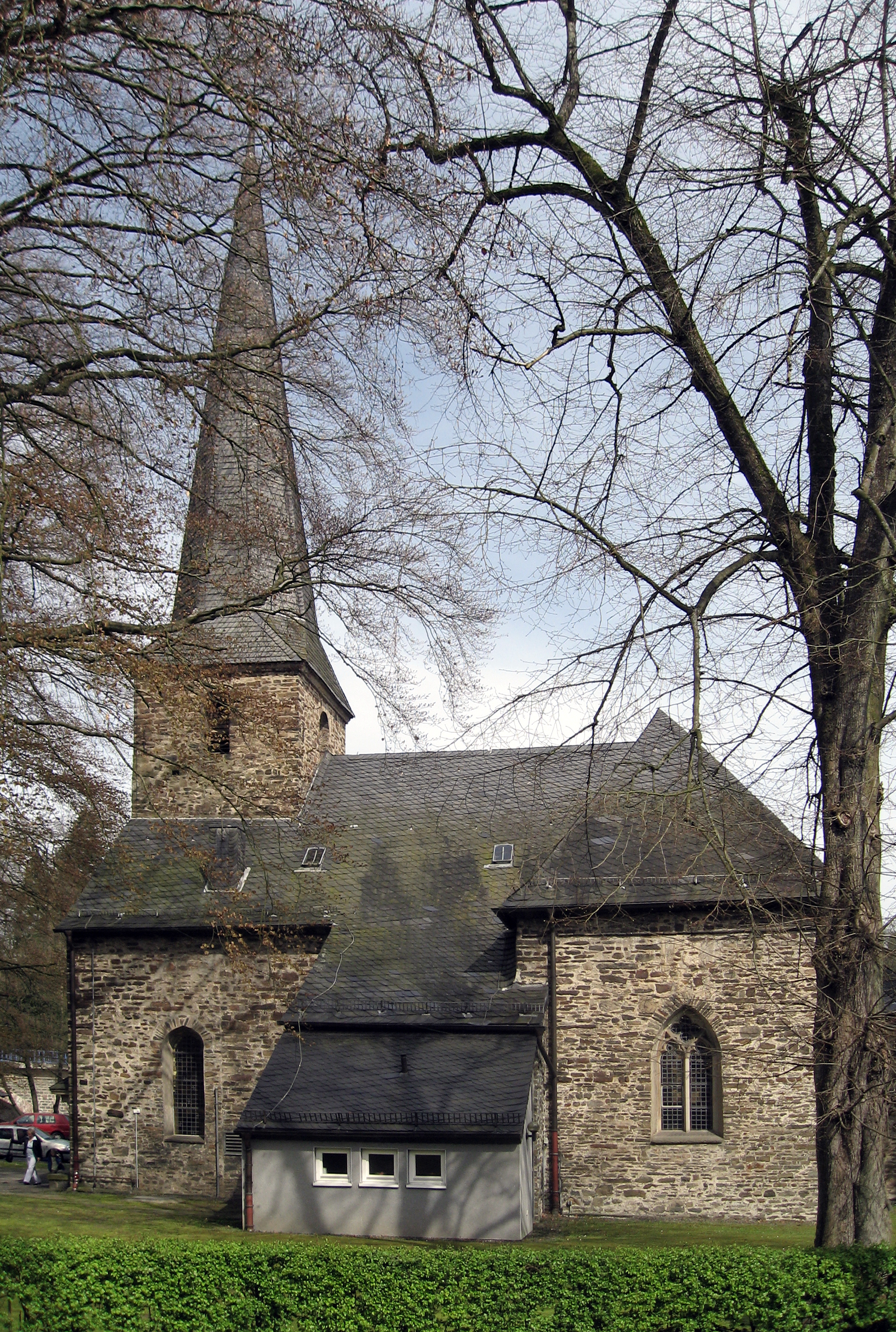
Protestant church of Dahl, with choir and sacristy remaining from before 1729 fire

In the late Middle Ages, a knightly manor of 'the Lord of Dael' is mentioned. Together with the stone church built in the second half of the 13th century, which is perhaps the oldest remaining building in the Volme valley, the site of this manor forms the centre of today's Dahl. The manor house and the church were both in large part destroyed by a catastrophic fire on 17 September 1729.

=== 19th century ===
After 1817, Dahl was an independent settlement, with its own mayor, within the district of Breckerfeld, but by order of the government of the Kingdom of Prussia was administratively subordinate to the district (Kreis) of Hagen.

In 1823, Felix Gerstein, the local governor, had a residence built in classical style, Haus Dahl. The estate included 1,600 acres (6.5 km^{2}) of land, a mill, and 32 smallholdings and farms on both sides of the River Volme.

In the course of increasing industrialisation and the associated economic expansion, in 1844–47 the country road in the Volme valley was expanded, and around 1850 a stone bridge was built across the river to accommodate the increased traffic.

In 1874 the Volmetal-Bahn railway line opened between Hagen and Brügge in Lüdenscheid, which considerably sped up transport of the raw materials needed by industry, wood and iron ore (from the Siegerland) into the Ruhr and to the small ironworking shops in the valleys near the Volme.

=== 20th century ===
In 1970 the former independent settlement of Dahl, consisting of Dahl, Priorei and Rummenohl, was incorporated into the town of Breckerfeld in the Kreis of Ennepe-Ruhr. In 1975, the Parliament of the state of North Rhine-Westphalia decided to transfer it to the metropolitan district of Hagen.

== Sources ==
- Ingrid Bischoff, Wilfried G. Vogt. "Die Inschriften des Dahler Kirchengestühls aus dem Jahre 1730. Mit einem Blick auf die Anfänge des Rittersitzes Haus Dahl an der Volme." Märkisches Jahrbuch für Geschichte 104 (2004) 47 ff.
- Andreas Daniel. Kleine Geschichte der Klinik Ambrock: Von der Tuberkulose-Heilstätte zum Zentrum für Pneumologie und Thoraxchirurgie. Münster : LVA Westfalen, Referat Presse- und Öffentlichkeitsarbeit, [1995]. OCLC 246966407
