= Breckerfeld =

- Town
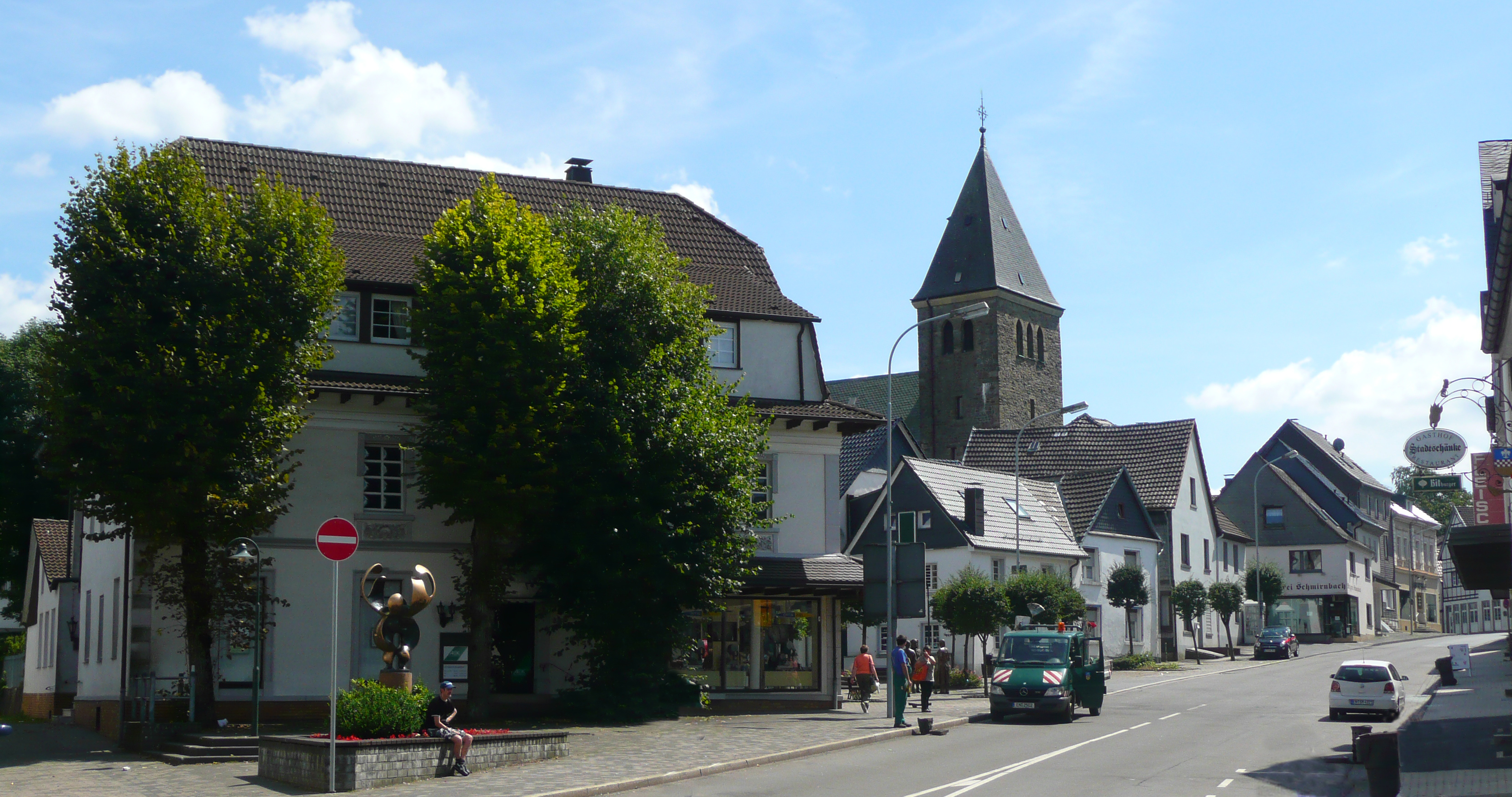
- Breckerfeld, Frankfurter Straße

- Flag Coat of arms

- Location of Breckerfeld within Ennepe-Ruhr-Kreis district
- Interactive map of Breckerfeld
- Location within Germany Location within North Rhine-Westphalia
- Coordinates: 51°16′N 07°28′E
- Country: Germany
- State: North Rhine-Westphalia
- Admin. region: Arnsberg
- District: Ennepe-Ruhr-Kreis
- Subdivisions: 2

Government
  - Mayor (2020–25): André Dahlhaus (CDU)

Area
  - Total: 59.09 km^{2} (22.81 sq mi)
- Elevation: 380–442 m (1,247–1,450 ft)

Population (2025-12-31)
  - Total: 8,703
  - Density: 147.3/km^{2} (381.5/sq mi)
- Time zone: UTC+01:00 (CET)
  - Summer (DST): UTC+02:00 (CEST)
- Postal codes: 58339
- Dialling codes: 02338
- Vehicle registration: EN
- Website: www.breckerfeld.de

Breckerfeld (German pronunciation: [ˈbʁɛkɐfɛlt]) is a town in the district of Ennepe-Ruhr-Kreis, in North Rhine-Westphalia (Germany). It is located in the southeasternmost part of the Ruhr area in northern Sauerland. The town is a member of Regionalverband Ruhr (association).

== Geography ==
Breckerfeld is a rural community in a hilly area. The weather around the city is generally cool with a substantial amount of rain. The town consists of two administrative parts: Breckerfeld proper and Waldbauer.

== History ==
Breckerfeld has had town rights since 1396 and was a member of the Hanseatic League. From 1907 until 1963 the Haspe–Voerde–Breckerfeld Light Railway connected Breckerfeld with the Elberfeld–Dortmund railway at Haspe. In 1970, the independent municipality of Dahl joined the town of Breckerfeld. In 1975, the federal parliament decided to reorganize this area into falling within the boundaries of the nearby district-free city, Hagen.

Nena, one of Germany's most successful pop-singers, spent the first several years of her life in Breckerfeld.

== Population ==
Historical population

Year	Pop.	±% p.a.
1965	5,779	—
1970	6,104	+1.10%
1975	6,629	+1.66%
1980	7,177	+1.60%
1985	7,628	+1.23%
1990	8,318	+1.75%
1995	8,892	+1.34%

Year	Pop.	±% p.a.
2000	9,108	+0.48%
2005	9,378	+0.59%
2010	9,265	−0.24%
2015	9,004	−0.57%
2020	8,912	−0.21%
2025	8,703	−0.47%

Source: Landesdatabank Nordrhein-Westfalen

== Politics ==
The current mayor of Breckerfeld is André Dalhaus of the CDU. In the most recent mayoral election on 13 September 2020, he was elected unopposed with 88% of votes in favour and 12% against.

=== Local council ===
Results of the 2020 council election.

The Breckerfeld municipal council governs the city alongside the Mayor. The most recent council election was held on 13 September 2020, and the results were as follows:

Party	Votes	%	±	Seats	±
Christian Democratic Union (CDU)	2,106	48.5	▲1.4	15	▲1
Social Democratic Party (SPD)	764	17.6	▼6.5	5	▼2
Alliance 90/The Greens (Grüne)	744	17.1	▲4.7	5	▲1
Voters' Association Breckerfeld	422	9.7	▼1.3	3	±0
Free Democratic Party (FDP)	308	7.1	▲1.6	2	±0
Valid votes	4,344	98.6			
Invalid votes	60	1.4			
Total	4,404	100.0		30	±0
Electorate/voter turnout	7,400	59.5			
Source: Hansestadt Breckerfeld

== Twin cities ==
- Gençay, Vienne, France
