= Hermann Peters =

- Company type: GmbH & Co. KG
- Industry: Auto parts suppliers
- Founded: 1947
- Headquarters: Ennepetal
- Key people: Juergen Freitag, Proprietor Markus Seitz, Managing Director
- Products: Spare parts for trucks and trailers
- Website: www.original-pe.com

Hermann Peters GmbH & Co. KG was founded 1947 by Hermann Peters in Ennepetal, Germany and known as Original PE since 1979.

The family business is a spare parts and wear parts manufacturer for trucks and trailers of vehicle manufacturers.

== History ==
- 1947: Foundation of the Hermann Peters KG
- 1967: Management take over by Juergen Freitag (nephew of the founder)
- 1976: Transfer of the ownership to Juergen Freitag
