= Sparkasse Hagen Tower =

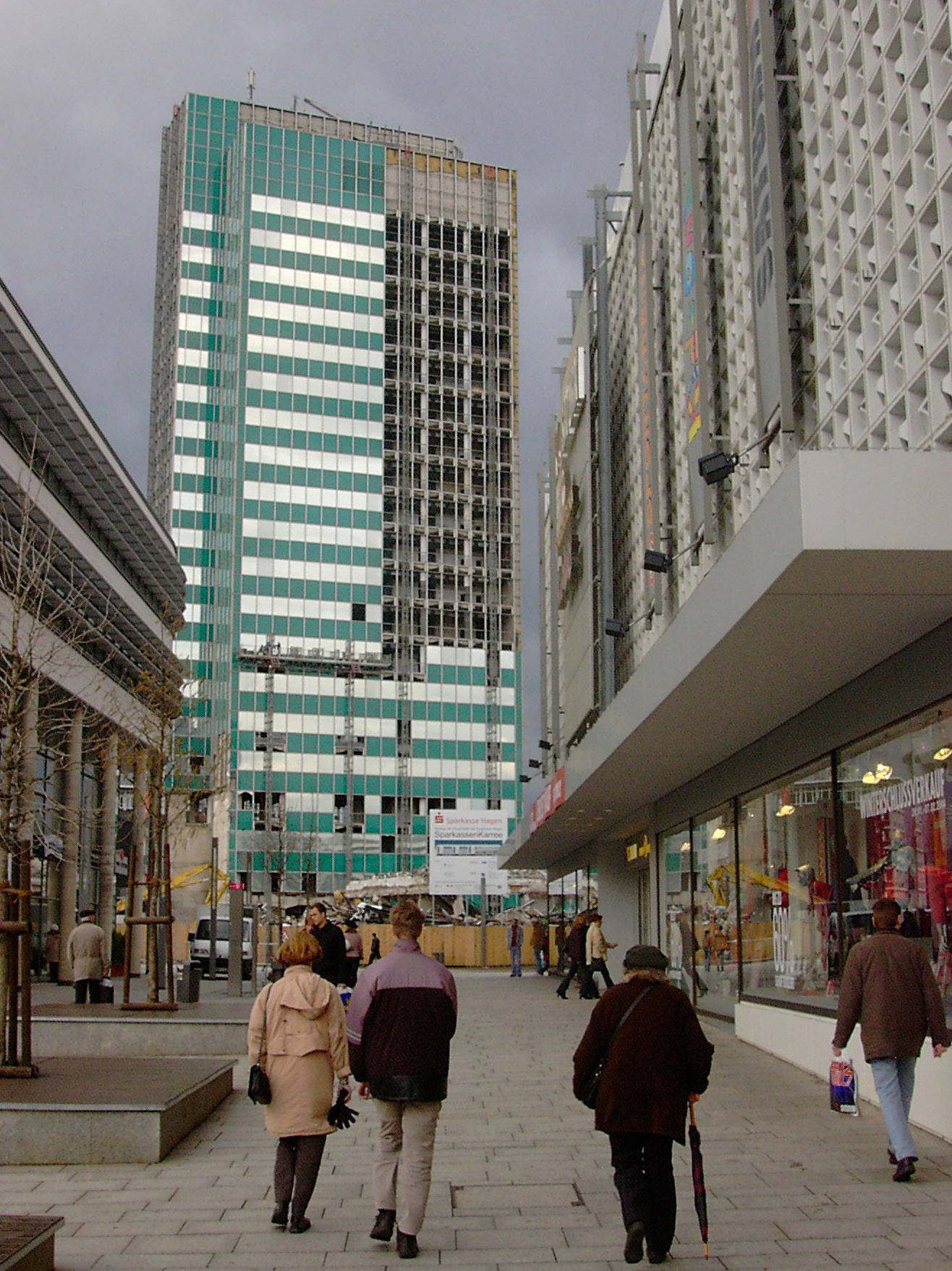
- The building a few weeks before implosion
- Interactive map of the Sparkasse Hagen Tower area
- Alternative names: Langer Oskar

General information
- Status: Demolished
- Type: Commercial offices
- Architectural style: Modernism
- Location: Körnerstraße 22; Hagen, Germany
- Coordinates: 51°21′35″N 7°28′18″E
- Construction started: 1 August 1972
- Completed: 29 November 1975
- Demolished: 7 March 2004
- Owner: Sparkasse Hagen

Height
- Antenna spire: 101 m (331 ft)
- Roof: 98 m (322 ft)
- Top floor: ca. 95 m (312 ft)

Technical details
- Floor count: 21; 2 below ground
- Floor area: 12,634 m^{2} (135,990 sq ft)

Design and construction
- Architect: Karl-Heinz Zernikow

The Sparkasse Hagen Tower (German: Sparkassenhochhaus Hagen, Verwaltungshochhaus/Verwaltungsgebäude der Sparkasse Hagen), often referenced as Langer Oskar (Long Oskar) by locals, was a 101 m (331 ft) skyscraper in the city centre of Hagen, North Rhine-Westphalia, Germany. The building served as the main office tower and part of the headquarters of the resident Sparkasse, Sparkasse Hagen. Built in the early 1970s it was a regional landmark for nearly three decades until demolition in 2004. It was replaced by a lower building complex, called Sparkassen-Karree Hagen, which was inaugurated in 2006.

== Construction ==
Construction began 1 August 1972 and finished on 29 November 1975. It was inaugurated on 29 November 1975. It was named after the director of the savings bank at that time, Oskar Specht. The architect of the building was Karl-Heinz Zernikow from Hagen.

The cultivated surface amounted to 634 m^{2} (6,820 sq ft) the effective area 12,634 m^{2} (135,990 sq ft) (office surface: 7.621 m (25.00 ft). The building had 22 storeys, of it 2 basements, the building height over the upper edge of the area was 98 m (322 ft), the building length of 37 m (121 ft), the building width approximately 18.5 m (61 ft).

The front consisted of a pre-hung aluminum construction with a surface of 10,300 m^{2} (111,000 sq ft). The converted area amounted to 57,000 m^{3} (2,000,000 cu ft). A characteristic was the constant reinforced concrete slab, which served the balance of the building for the elevator pits: 113 by 9 m (371 by 30 ft), and 1.72 m (5 ft 8 in) thick.

Water leakage penetrated, and damaged building insulation. Repairs would have required further measures, including improvements to the air conditioning system and installation of a second stairway for fire safety reasons. Repair costs were estimated at €42 million. It was estimated that demolition would cost 5 million euro and construction of a new building would cost €16.8 million. Therefore, it was decided to demolish the current building and construct a new one.

== Demolition ==
The building was explosively imploded at 10:53 on 7 March 2004, in the then-largest and riskiest breakup of a multistoried building in Europe. 1,450 explosive charges weighing 250 kilograms were used in timed sequence to cause 26,000 tons concrete and steel to first fold and then collapse into a predetermined 70 m (230 ft) bed without damaging neighboring structures. The successful breakup is considered as master achievement of the specialty firm from Thuringia and receives an entry in the Guinness World Records.

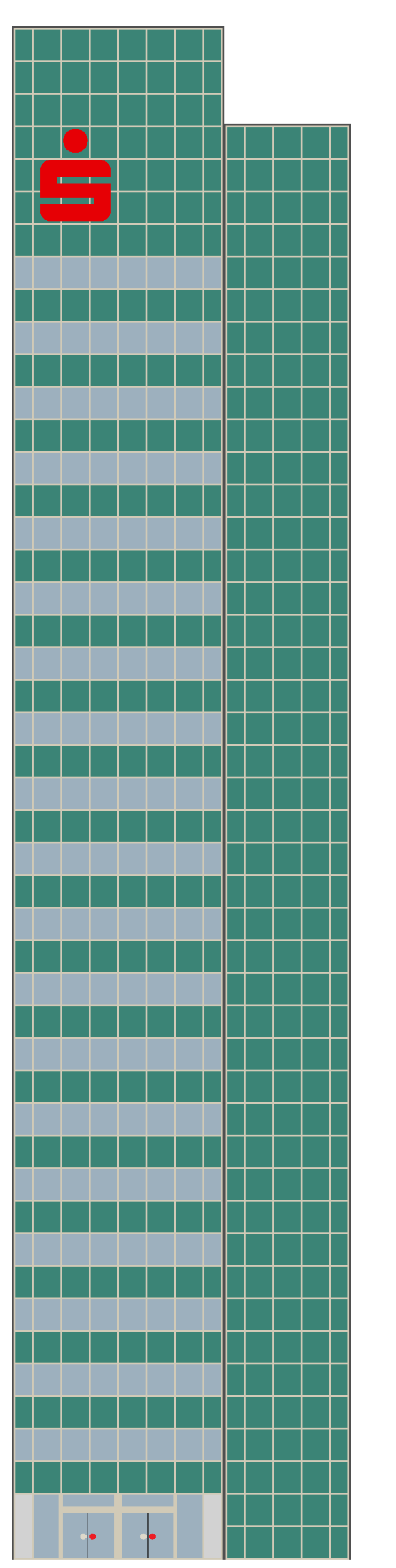
Layout of the original building's narrow side

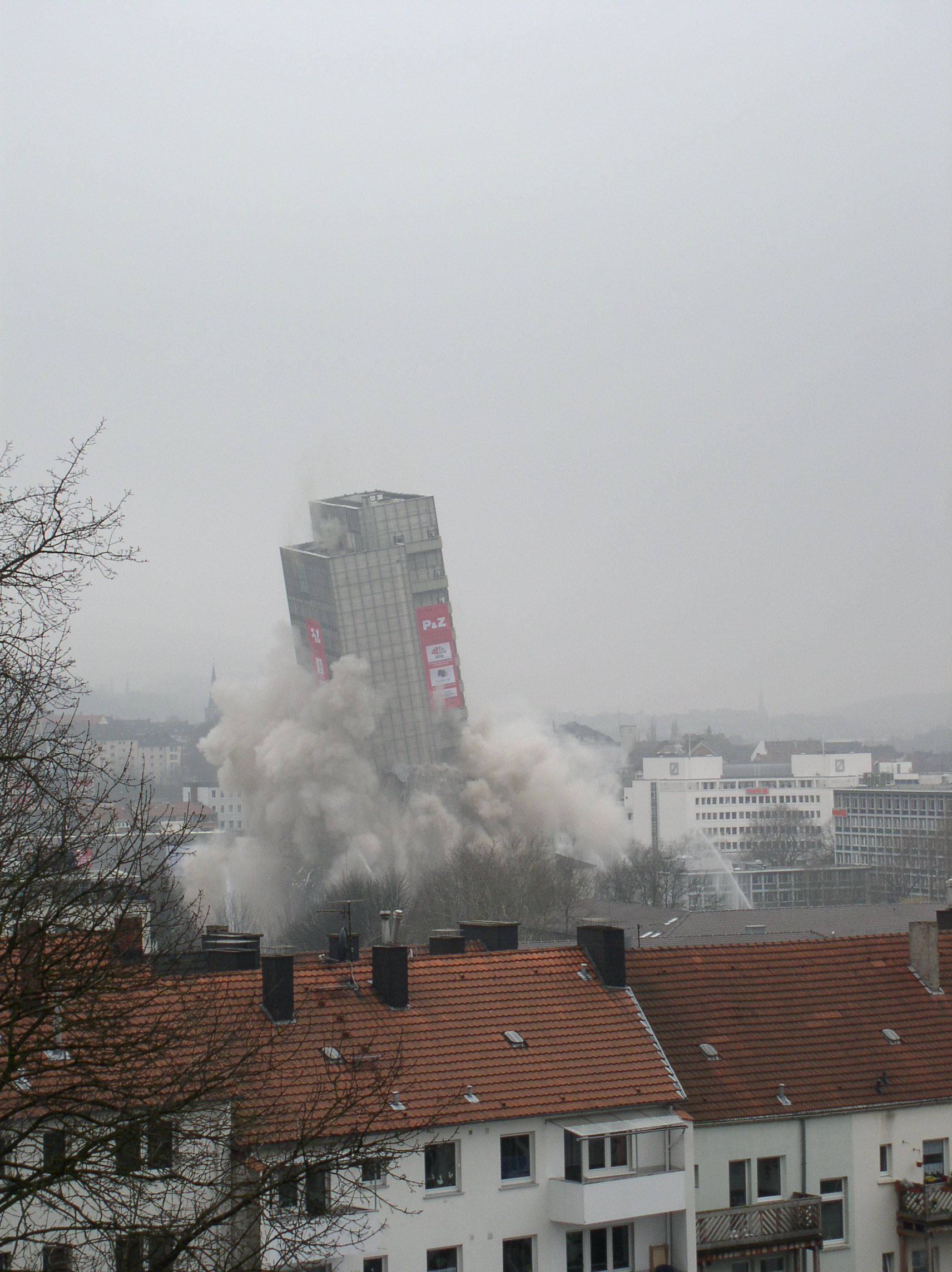
Implosion on 7 March 2004

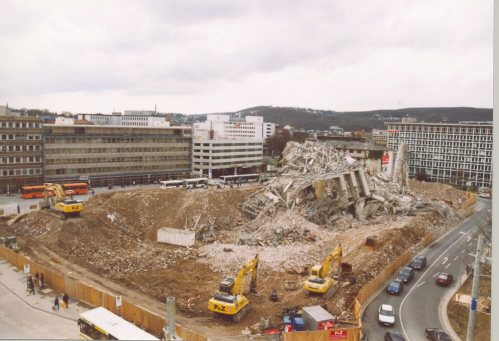
The building's place one week after the implosion
