= Sparkasse Hagen =

- Industry: Banking
- Headquarters: Hagen, Germany
- Number of locations: 26
- Key people: Jörg Dehm; Frank Walter; Rainer Kurth; Klaus Obermaier Liesen
- Total assets: €2.6 billion (2012)
- Number of employees: 547

Sparkasse Hagen is the Sparkasse of Hagen, North Rhine-Westphalia, serving the greater Hagen area. Its former main office, the Sparkasse Hagen Tower, was a regional landmark until its demolition in 2004.

== See also ==
- List of banks in Germany
