= Ennepetal =

- Town
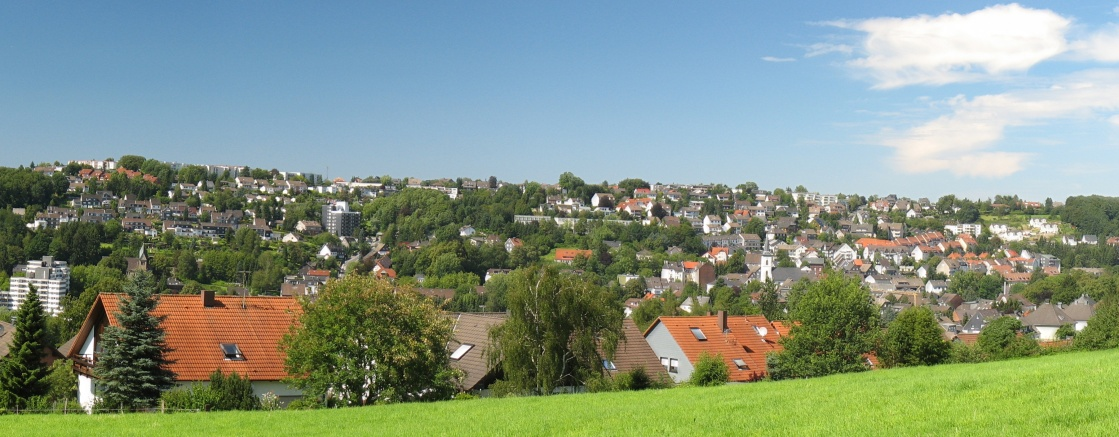
- Ennepetal-Voerde in summer

- Flag Coat of arms

- Location of Ennepetal within Ennepe-Ruhr-Kreis district
- Interactive map of Ennepetal
- Location within Germany Location within North Rhine-Westphalia
- Coordinates: 51°17′N 7°20′E
- Country: Germany
- State: North Rhine-Westphalia
- Admin. region: Arnsberg
- District: Ennepe-Ruhr-Kreis

Government
  - Mayor (2020–25): Imke Heymann

Area
  - Total: 57.77 km^{2} (22.31 sq mi)
- Elevation: 170–390 m (560–1,280 ft)

Population (2025-12-31)
  - Total: 29,266
  - Density: 506.6/km^{2} (1,312/sq mi)
- Time zone: UTC+01:00 (CET)
  - Summer (DST): UTC+02:00 (CEST)
- Postal codes: 58256
- Dialling codes: 02333
- Vehicle registration: EN
- Website: www.ennepetal.de

Ennepetal (German pronunciation: [ˈɛnəpəˌtaːl], lit. 'Ennepe Valley'; Westphalian: Iämpedal) is a town in the district of Ennepe-Ruhr-Kreis, in North Rhine-Westphalia, Germany. It was created in 1949 out of the former municipalities Milspe and Voerde. It was named after the river Ennepe, which flows through the municipality.

The town was featured in the headlines when on April 12, 2005, a hostage taker snatched several school children from a school bus, and took them as hostages, see Ennepetal hostage taking.

== Division of the town ==
Ennepetal is divided into nine quarters (Ortsteile), which resemble former towns and villages. The population is shown as of 10 June 2015:

- Altenvoerde (3663)
- Bülbringen/Oberbauer (1470)
- Büttenberg (3689)
- Hasperbach (1208)
- Königsfeld (1090)
- Milspe (9776)
- Oelkinghausen (573)
- Rüggeberg (1482)
- Voerde (7438)

== Population ==
Historical population

Year	Pop.	±% p.a.
1965	34,713	—
1970	37,137	+1.36%
1975	37,339	+0.11%
1980	35,728	−0.88%
1985	33,666	−1.18%
1990	34,270	+0.36%
1995	34,224	−0.03%

Year	Pop.	±% p.a.
2000	33,725	−0.29%
2005	32,234	−0.90%
2010	30,486	−1.11%
2015	29,926	−0.37%
2020	30,117	+0.13%
2025	29,266	−0.57%

Source: Landesdatabank Nordrhein-Westfalen

== Politics ==
The current mayor of Ennepetal is independent politician Imke Heymann. She was first elected in 2015 with the endorsement of the CDU, The Greens, Free Voters, and FDP. In the most recent mayoral election was held on 13 September 2020, Heymann was re-elected with 70.3% of votes with the backing of the SPD and CDU. She was opposed by Sotirios Kostas (18.2%) and Cornelia Born-Maijer (11.5%), who both ran as independents.

=== Local council ===
Results of the 2020 local council election

The Ennepetal municipal council governs the city alongside the Mayor. The most recent council election was held on 13 September 2020, and the results were as follows:

Party	Votes	%	+/-	Seats	+/-
Social Democratic Party (SPD)	3,792	31.5	▼7.1	11	▼5
Christian Democratic Union (CDU)	3,556	29.5	▲3.3	11	±0
Alliance 90/The Greens (Grüne)	2,252	18.7	▲8.9	7	▲3
Free Democratic Party (FDP)	1,089	9.0	▲2.9	3	▲1
Free Voters Ennepetal (FWE)	780	6.5	▼2.3	2	▼2
The Left (Die Linke)	572	4.8	▲0.8	2	±0
Valid votes	12,041	98.0			
Invalid votes	248	2.0			
Total	12,289	100.0		36	▼6
Electorate/voter turnout	24,726	49.7			
Source: City of Ennepetal

== Twin towns – sister cities ==
Ennepetal is twinned with:

- Vilvoorde, Belgium

== Transport ==
The Ennepetal (Gevelsberg) station on the Wuppertal–Dortmund railway is served by regional trains.

The town also had a station named "Voerde" on the Kleinbahn Haspe-Voerde-Breckerfeld, which in former times was the longest streetcar in Germany. Today, the former track is being used as a walk and bicycle way, connecting the Ruhr area to the nearby Sauerland.

== Notable places ==
The Klutert Cave is one of the largest natural caves of Germany with a length of over 5 km.

== Economy ==
- dormakaba
- febi - Ferdinand Bilstein
- ABC - Altenloh Brinck & Co (screws)
- Dahlhaus Leuchten, GmbH
- Ernst Mager KG (screws)

== Notable people ==
=== Sons and daughters of the town ===
- Karl-Heinz Peters (1903–1990), film actor

=== People who are connected to Ennepetal ===
- Dirk Rauin (born 1957), handball player and coach
- Ralf Waldmann (born 1966), motorcycle racing driver
