= Hagen-Priorei =

Coordinates: 51°17′24″N 7°31′13″E

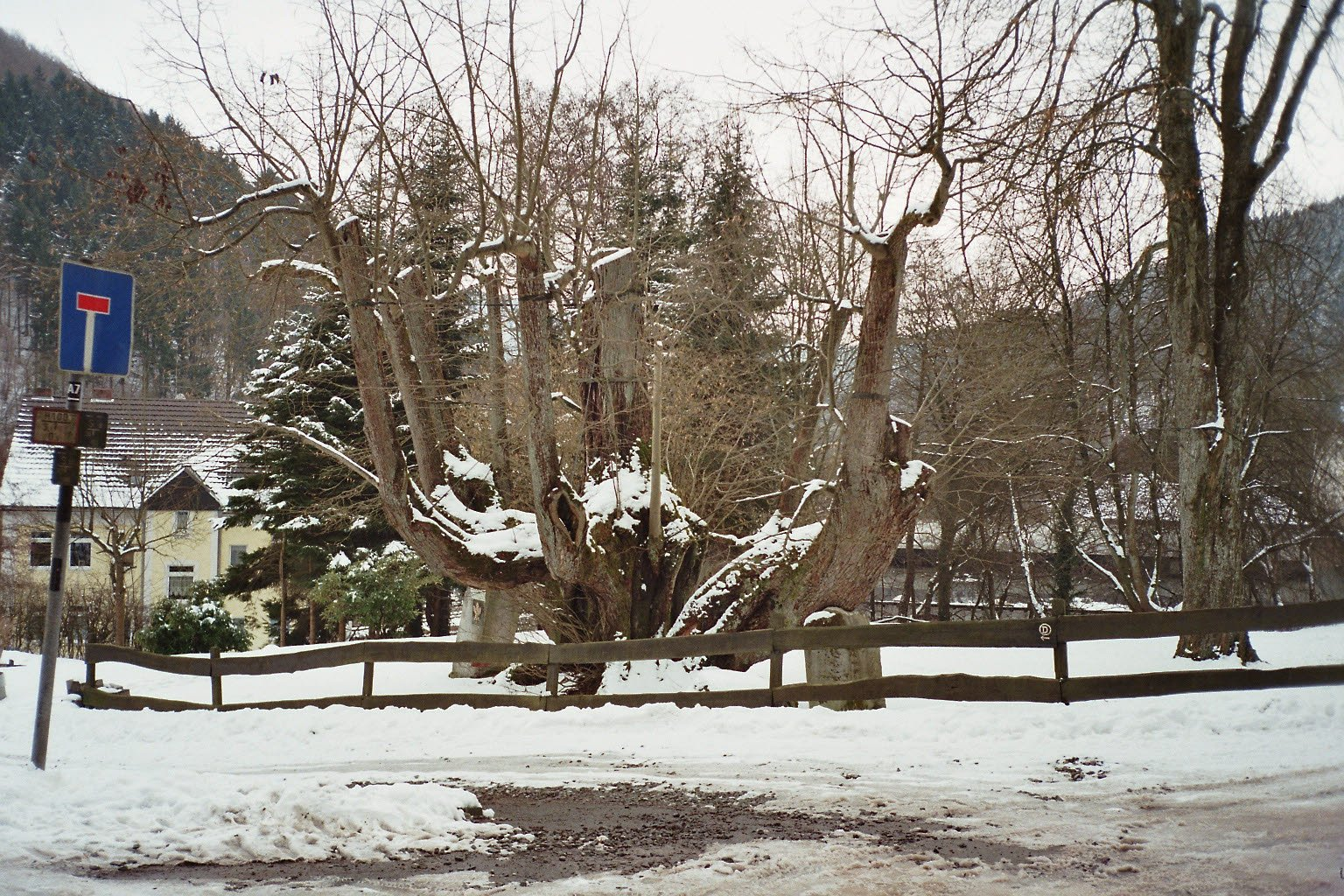
Priorlinde

Priorei (officially called Hagen-Priorei) is a small town on the River Volme in the Ruhr district of Germany. Administratively a part of the independent urban district of Hagen (North Rhine Westphalia) since 1975, it is situated some 12 km south of Hagen city centre.

Priorei is best known for an ancient tree, believed to be over 1,000 years old, the Priorlinde (the prior's lime). This is the basis of the town's name, although no priory ever existed here: it is a corruption of an Old High German word meaning a place of assembly for law making, and such assemblies were commonly held under a lime tree.

Numerous mills, smithies, and foundries arose along the Volme in the pre-industrial age, harnessing the river's power, and Priorei was one of the localities in which the iron industry developed during the 19th and early 20th centuries.

Priorei lies on federal road 54 (Gronau – Wiesbaden) and is served by bus route 510 (Baukloh – Hagen – Sterbecke).
