= Hagen-Haspe =

Coordinates: 51°20′52″N 7°25′25″E

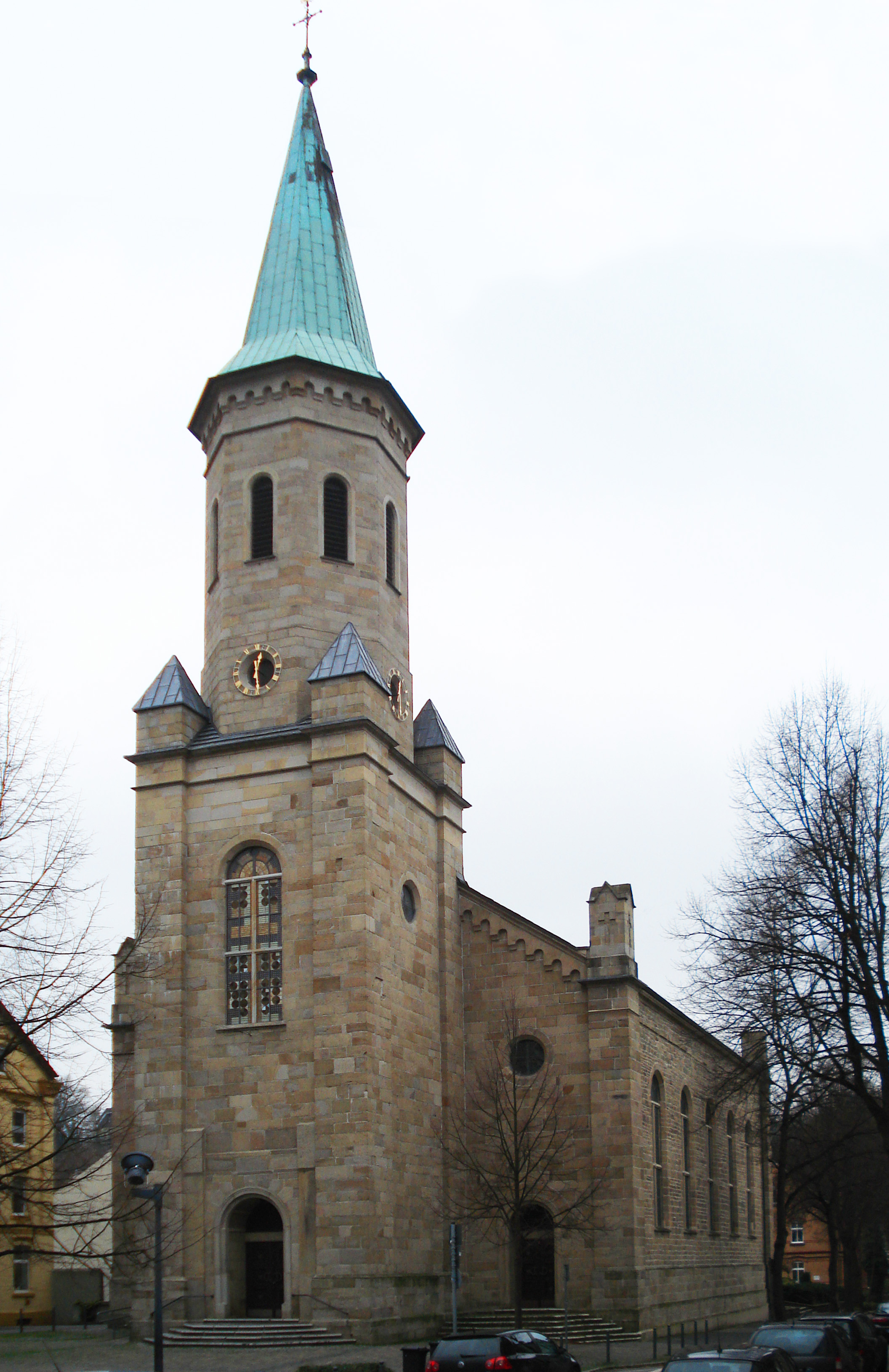
Church in Hagen-Haspe

Hagen-Haspe is a borough of the city of Hagen in the state of North Rhine-Westphalia, Germany. It is located in the valley of the Ennepe at the confluence of the Hasper.

As of 1911, Haspe was located on the railway from Düsseldorf to Dortmund, ten miles north-east of Barmen by rail. Its industries included iron foundries, rolling mills, puddling furnaces, and the manufacturing of iron, steel, and brass wares and of machines.

Haspe was raised to the rank of a town in 1873.
