= Hagen =

- City
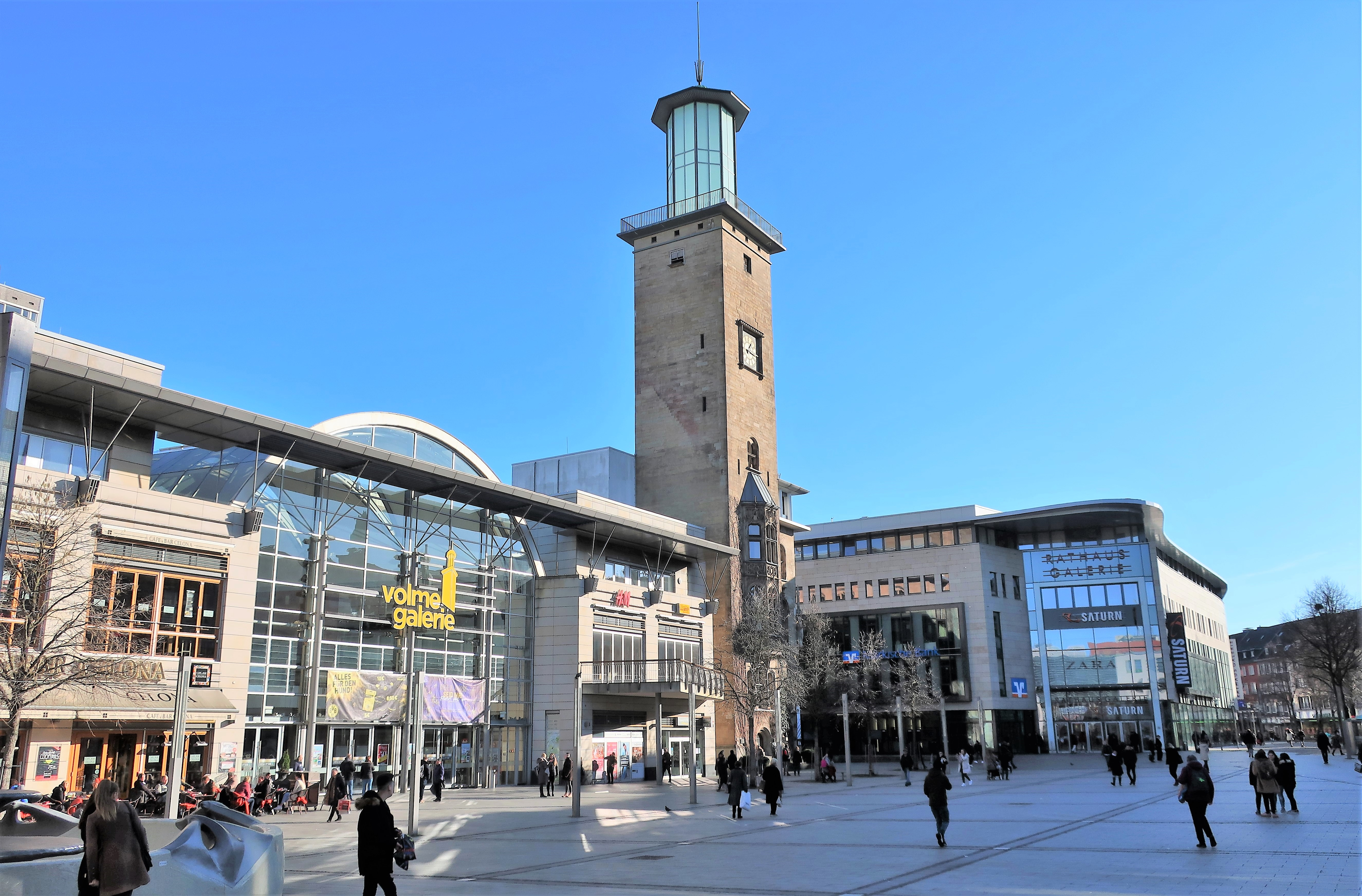
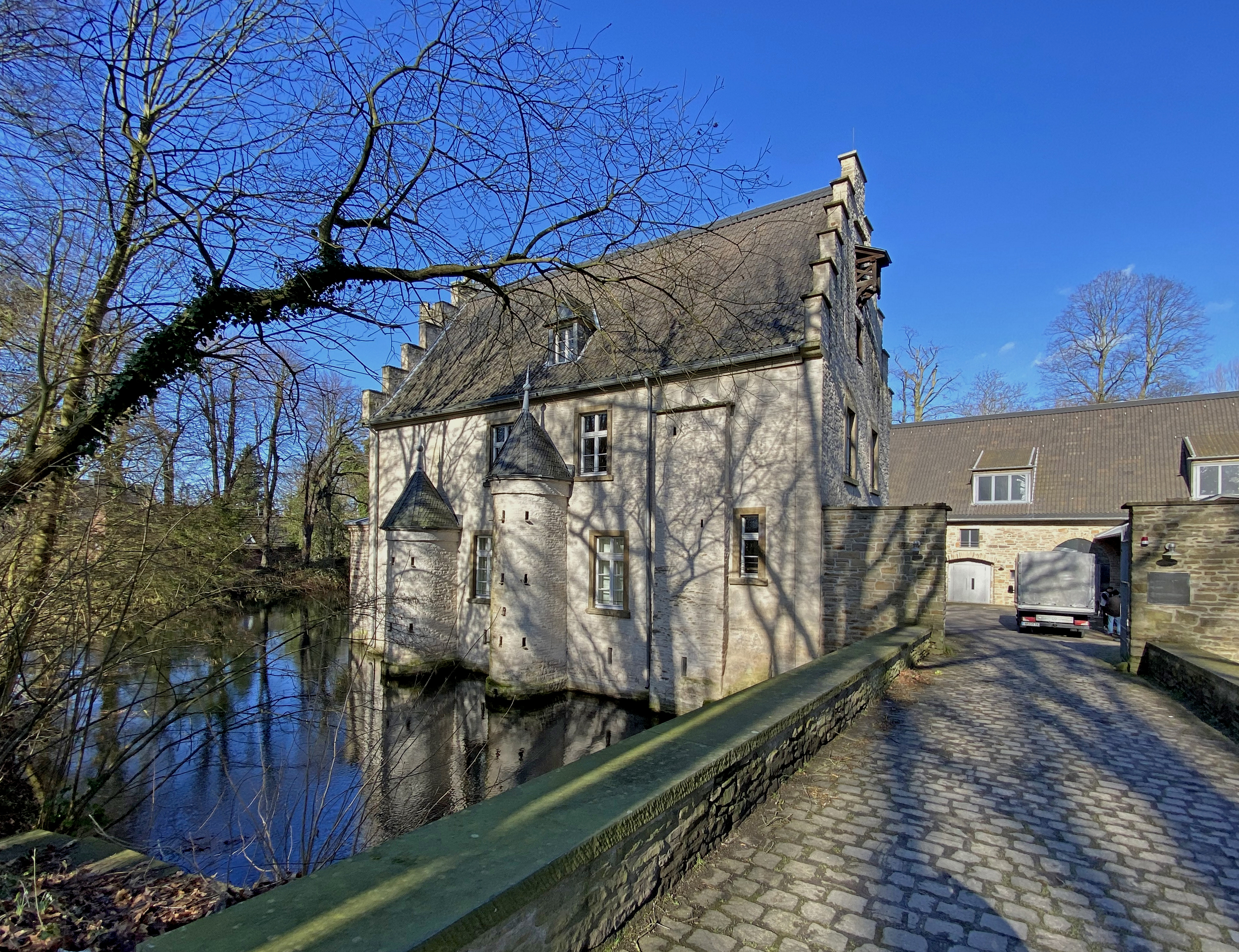
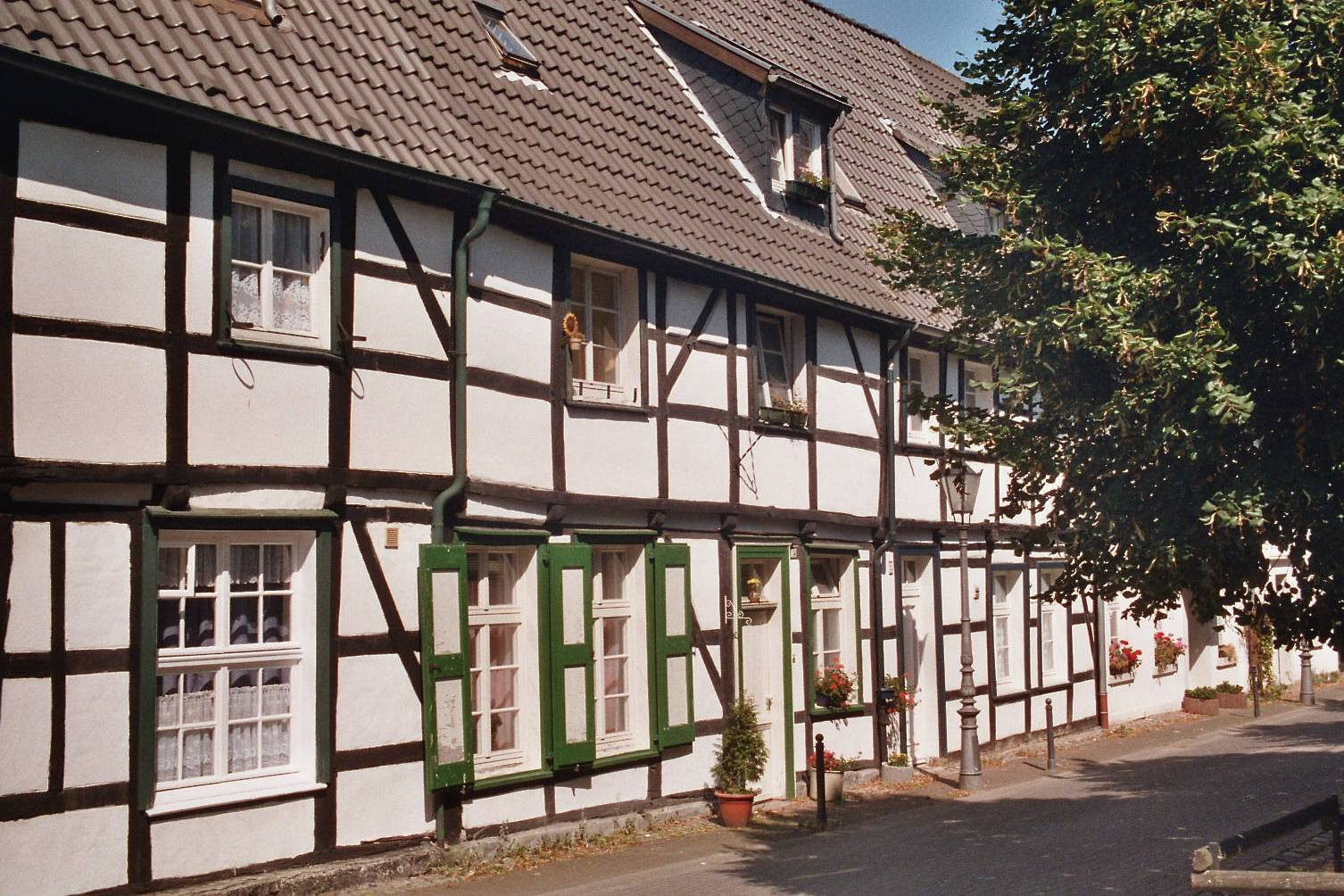
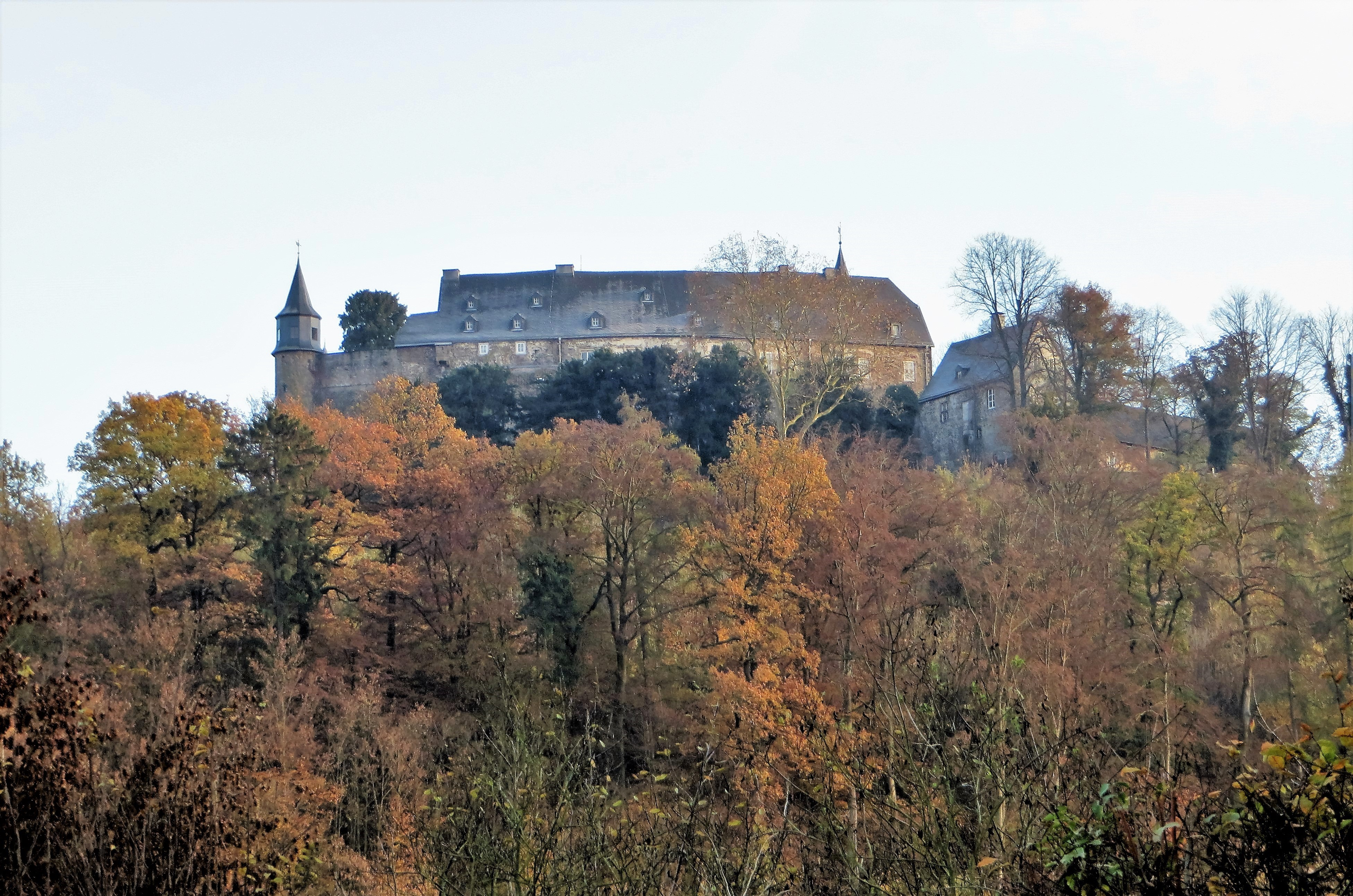
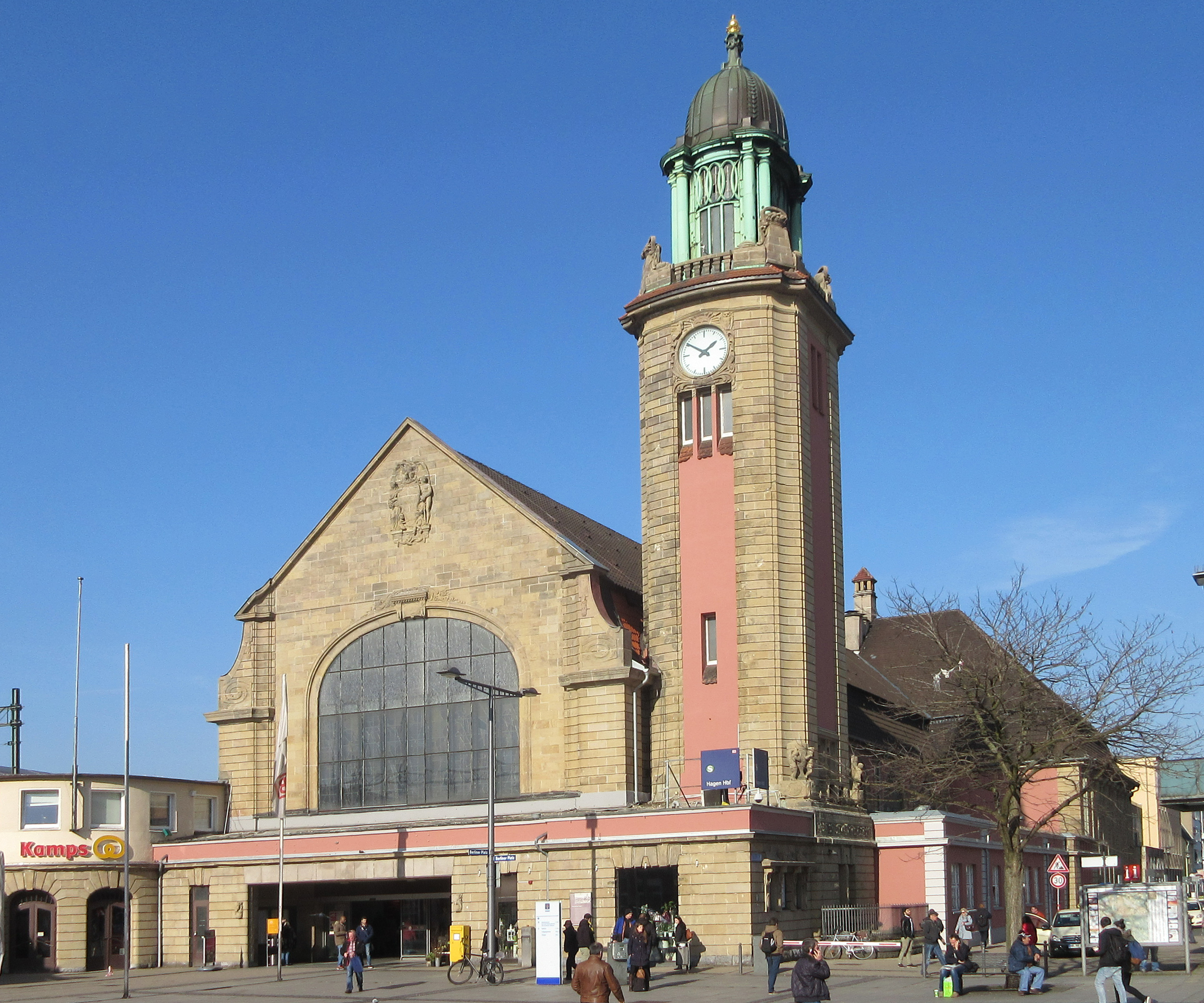
- Rathausplatz Werdringen Castle Lange Riege Schloss Hohenlimburg Train Station

- Flag Coat of arms
- Interactive map of Hagen
- Location within Germany Location within North Rhine-Westphalia
- Coordinates: 51°22′N 7°29′E
- Country: Germany
- State: North Rhine-Westphalia
- Admin. region: Arnsberg
- District: Urban district

Government
  - Mayor (2025–30): Dennis Rehbein (CDU)

Area
  - Total: 160.45 km^{2} (61.95 sq mi)
- Elevation: 106 m (348 ft)

Population (2025-12-31)
  - Total: 189,983
  - Density: 1,184.1/km^{2} (3,066.7/sq mi)
- Time zone: UTC+01:00 (CET)
  - Summer (DST): UTC+02:00 (CEST)
- Postal codes: 58089–58099, 58119, 58135
- Dialling codes: 02331, 02334, 02337, 02304
- Vehicle registration: HA
- Website: hagen.de

Hagen (German: [ˈhaːɡn̩]) is a city in the state of North Rhine-Westphalia, in western Germany, on the southeastern edge of the Ruhr area, 15 km south of Dortmund, where the rivers Lenne and Volme meet the Ruhr. In 2023, the population was 197,677.

The city is home to the FernUniversität Hagen (University of Hagen), the only state-funded distance education university in Germany.

== Geography ==
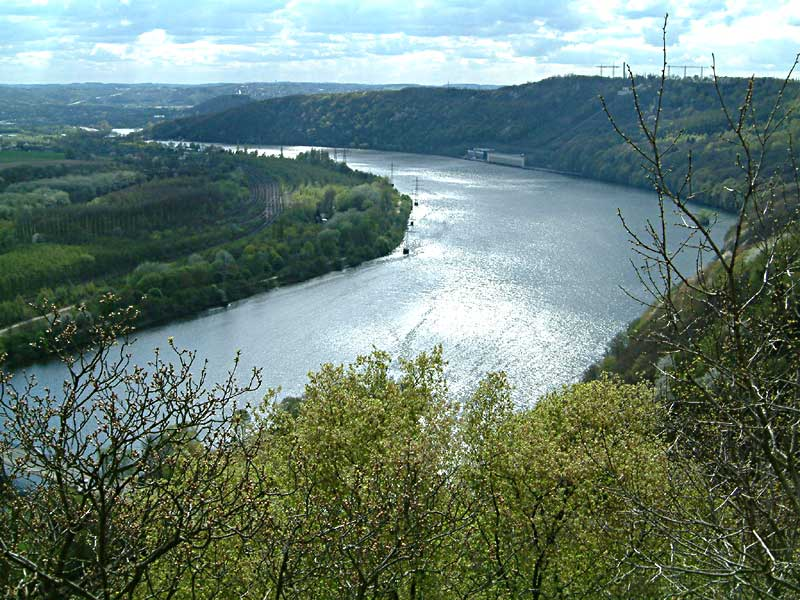
Hengsteysee

The largest extension of Hagen's municipal area is 17.1 km in a north-south direction and 15.5 km in a west-east direction. The city boundary of 89.7 km is made up of 3.3 km to Dortmund, 9 km to the district of Unna, 56.6 km to the Ennepe-Ruhr district and 20.8 km to the Märkisch district. The area of the city (160.36 km^{2}) is roughly the size of the Principality of Liechtenstein.

42 per cent of Hagen's municipal area consists of forest. The four rivers in Hagen stretch over a length of 52.2 km: Ruhr 11.5 km, Lenne 13.1 km, Volme 21.3 km and Ennepe 6.3 km. The difference in altitude from the lowest point on the Ruhr near Vorhalle (86 metres above sea level) to the highest point east of Bölling ♁51° 18′ N, 7° 34′ E (438 metres above sea level) is 352 metres.

=== Geology and palaeontology ===
Since the early 19th century, the Hagen area has been regarded as a classic discovery region for palaeontology and archaeology

There are various rocks and deposits from the Devonian to the Carboniferous in the municipal area. Marine and terrestrial deposits from the Cretaceous, Tertiary and Holocene periods have been preserved in karst caves in the mass limestone.

Other fossil sites with animal and plant remains from the Palaeozoic to the Mesozoic have also made important contributions to geoscientific research. In the area around Hagen, for example, the bones of land dinosaurs and early mammals as well as plant remains from the Lower Cretaceous period were found.

The former Hagen-Vorhalle brickworks quarry is considered an important site for the discovery of fossilised insects and other fossils, including early large dragonflies with wingspans of 40 cm, extinct primordial web-footed butterflies and giant centipedes and millipedes from the Upper Carboniferous period. The Hagen-Vorhalle quarry is considered a geotope of global importance for palaeontological research. Finds from the quarry and from the entire region can be seen in the Museum of Prehistory and Early History in Werdringen moated castle.

In a side valley of the Lenne near Holthausen, the remains of Stone Age people were discovered in the 'Blätterhöhle' cave. With a C14 age of up to 11,300 years, they date from the beginning of the Mesolithic period. This makes them the oldest evidence to date of anatomically modern humans in the post-glacial period on the European continent.

== History ==
=== Medieval times ===
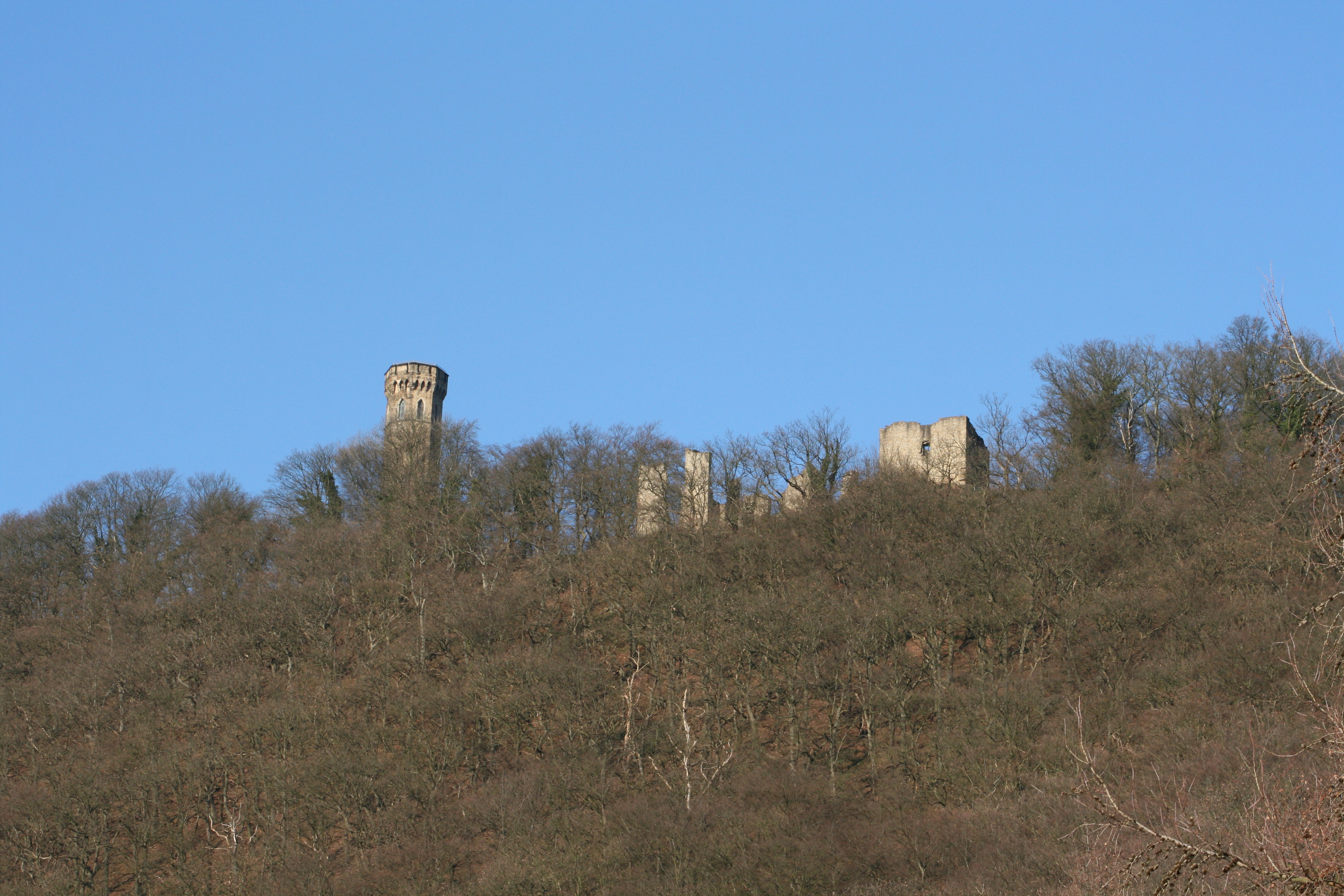
The ruins of Syburg

The Hagen region first appears in historical records in the Lorsch Annals (Latin: Annales Laureshamenses): In 775, Charlemagne's troops conquered the Saxon Hohensyburg (then called Sigiburg) castle located near the city limits of Dortmund above the Ruhr-Lenne estuary.

Hagen itself was first mentioned around the year 1200, and is presumed to have been the name of a farm at the confluence of the Volme and the Ennepe rivers. After the conquest of Burg Volmarstein in 1324, Hagen passed to the County of Mark.

=== Early modern period ===
After the Treaty of Xanten in 1614, it was granted to the Margraviate of Brandenburg, which became part of the newly founded Kingdom of Prussia in 1701.

A major fire destroyed a significant part of Hagen's buildings in 1724. With the help of the Prussian state administration, Hagen was rebuilt within a short time.

Hagen was granted town privileges on 3 September 1746.

=== 19th and early 20th Century ===
After the defeat of Prussia in the Fourth Coalition, Hagen was incorporated into the Grand Duchy of Berg founded by France from 1807 to 1813. It became part of the new Prussian province of Westphalia after the Congress of Vienna in 1815.

From 1817, Hagen was the seat of an office and a district within the administrative district of Arnsberg. In 1837, the revised town regulations and a magistrate were introduced.

In the course of industrialisation, Hagen was connected to the network of the Bergisch-Märkische Eisenbahngesellschaft in 1848 and developed into an important railway junction.

By 1865, Hagen had overtaken Iserlohn, which had previously been the leading town in South Westphalia in terms of population and economic power.

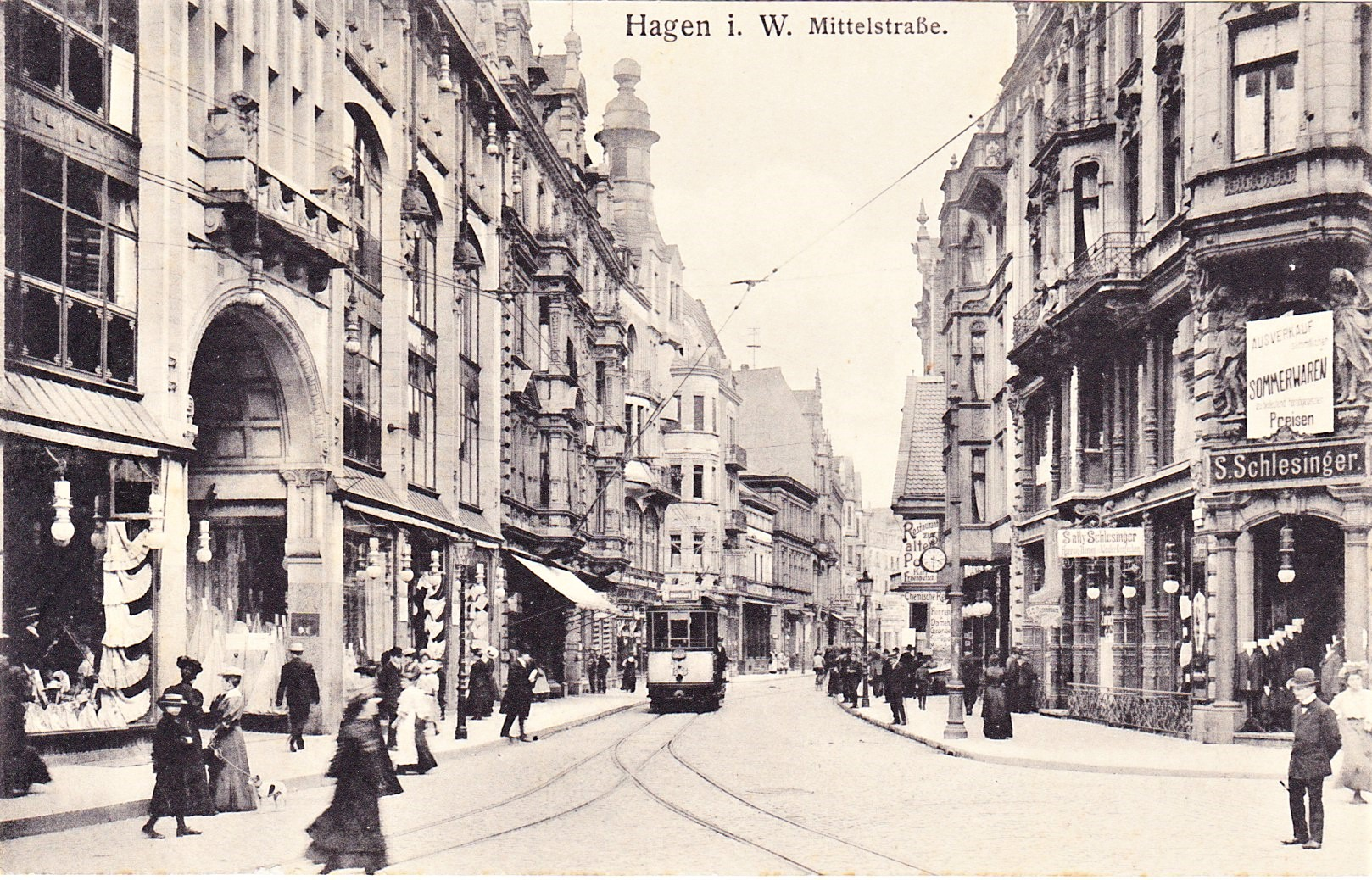
Mittelstraße, 1912

During the German Empire from 1871 to 1914, Hagen experienced a period of prosperity. Through urbanisation and industrialisation of the 19th century, the city developed into the main centre for the entire region south of the river Ruhr. In 1887, Hagen was administratively separated from the district of Hagen and became an independent city (urban district).

In the years following the turn of the century, the banker and patron Karl Ernst Osthaus brought many later important architects to the city, including Henry van de Velde, Peter Behrens and Walter Gropius. They established Hagen's reputation as a link between Art Nouveau and Modernism (Hagener Impul). The centrepiece of this initiative was the Folkwang Museum and the (only partially built) garden city of Hohenhagen (Gartenstadt Hohenhagen).

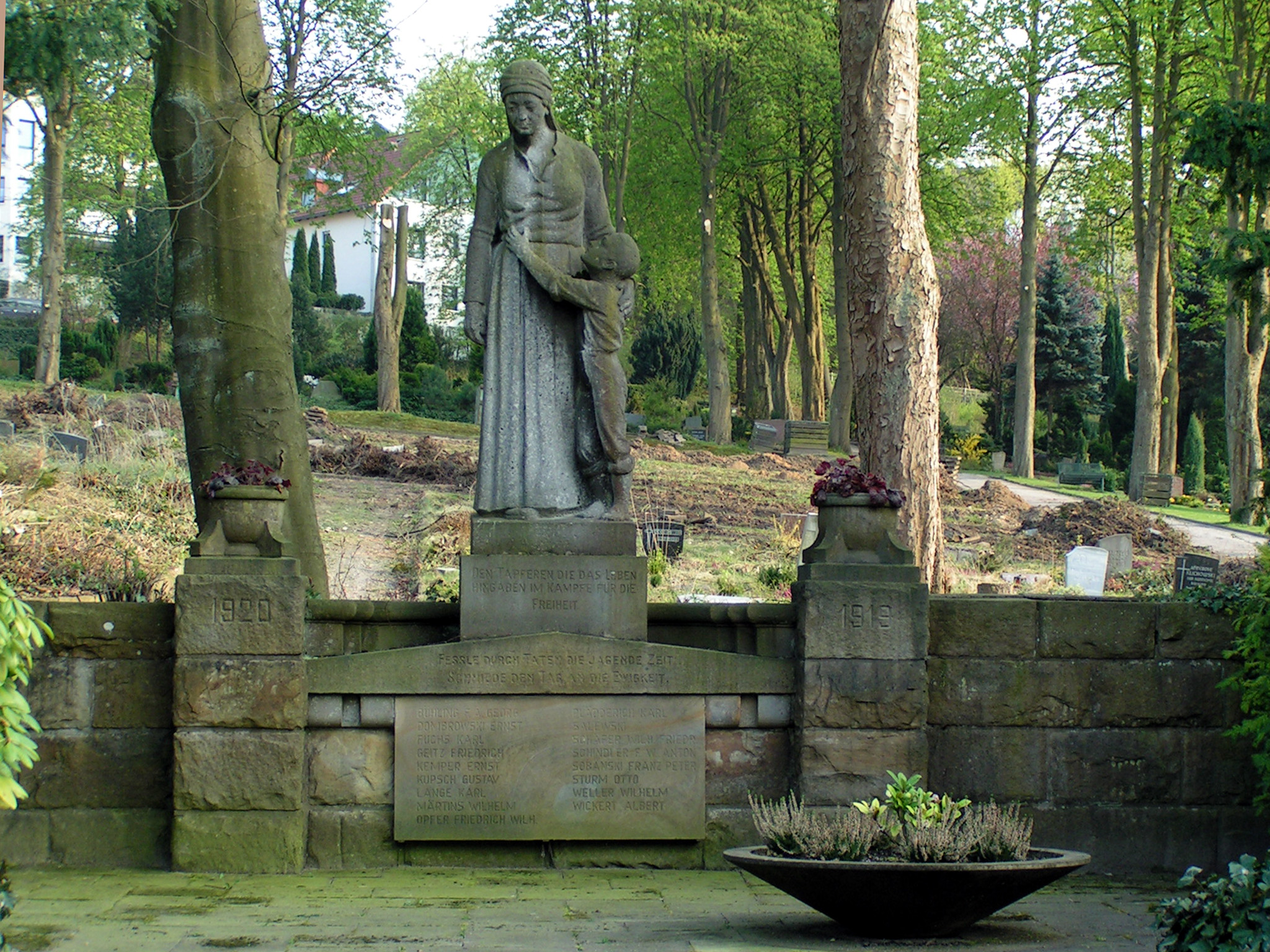
Memorial to the Ruhr Uprising, Hagen

In reaction to the Kapp Putsch in March 1920, when rightists tried to overthrow the elected government and set up an authoritarian regime, tens of thousands of leftist workers in the Ruhr Valley, Germany's most important industrial area, used the opportunity for a revolutionary uprising from the Left. In the Ruhr uprising of 13 March – 2 April 1920, the 50,000-man Ruhr Red Army took control of the industrial district. Government and paramilitary forces were ordered against the workers, suppressing the uprising, and killing an estimated 1,000 workers. A memorial to the uprising was installed in Hagen.

By 1928, Hagen had developed into a city of more than 100,000 inhabitants.

=== During the Nazi regime ===
During World War II, forced laborers of the 3rd SS construction brigade were dispatched in the town by the Nazis in 1943.

Hagen was bombed repeatedly, by both the Royal Air Force and the United States Eighth Air Force. On the night of 1 October 1943, 243 Lancasters and 8 Mosquitoes from the Royal Air Force's Bomber Command attacked the city. According to the Bomber Command Campaign Diary, "This raid was a complete success achieved on a completely cloud-covered target of small size, with only a moderate bomber effort and at trifling cost." Hagen sustained severe damage from that raid, and hundreds of civilians were killed. After the war, the city centre was almost completely destroyed, so that only the surrounding districts still partially reflect the city's Wilhelminian architectural character.

The victims of the Second World War and National Socialism in Hagen: more than 2,200 people died in Allied bombing raids between 1940 and 1945. Over 10,000 Hagen citizens died on the various fronts of the Second World War. Dozens of Hagen citizens were murdered in concentration camps and prisons for racial, religious, ideological and political reasons.

In August 2021, discovery of a cache of Nazi artifacts from a house was announced. A history teacher revealed a painted portrait of Adolf Hitler and medals decorated with eagles and swastikas, a newspaper from 1945, a pistol, gas masks, brass knuckles, and stacks of documents. It is also found out that the house once served as the headquarters of the Nationalsozialistische Volkswohlfahrt.

=== Post-war period ===
In April 1945, the US Army liberated the city, which was later part of the British occupation zone. In August 1948, Hagen was included in the new state of North Rhine-Westphalia and soon became part of the Federal Republic of Germany (FRG, also known as West Germany), founded in 1949.

In the 1950s and 1960s, Hagen experienced another period of rapid growth, spreading mainly into the flatter, northern plain. Today's city centre therefore lies somewhat to the south of the main residential areas.

=== Late 20th century to the present ===
At the beginning of the 1970s, the decline of heavy industry in Hagen began in the wake of the steel crisis. Hasper Hütte was completely shut down between 1972 and 1982, Gussstahlwerke Wittmann went bankrupt and two of the three plants of Stahlwerke Südwestfalen were closed. Further job losses affected the food industry with the breweries Bettermann and Andreas, the confectionery manufacturers Villosa and Grothe and the production plant of Zwieback Brandt.

The pedestrian zone in the city centre was opened in the 1970s.

In the early 1980s, Hagen made a name for itself as the 'Liverpool of New German Wave (Neue Deutsche Welle)'. Many well-known musicians and bands of this musical genre (including Nena, Extrabreit and the sisters Annette and Inga Humpe) have their roots in Hagen.

Economically, Hagen came under renewed pressure in the 1990s due to increasing globalisation. A further wave of deindustrialisation began in the steel sector, while Hagen's population declined at the same time. Hagen's debt level was €1.383 billion on 31 December 2012.

Since the 2000s, major new construction and renovation projects have been realised that have significantly shaped Hagen's cityscape today. Examples include the Volme- and Rathaus-Galerie, the redesign of Friedrich-Ebert-Platz and the station forecourt (Berliner Platz) as well as the construction of the new town hall on the riverside.

In mid-July 2021, Hagen was affected by a flood disaster caused by heavy rainfall. In particular, damage was caused in the Volme valley and Hohenlimburg.

== Economy ==
Owing to the extensive use of water power along the rivers Ruhr, Lenne, Volme and Ennepe, metal processing played an important role in the region of Hagen in and even before the 15th century. In the 17th and 18th centuries, textile and steel industries, as well as paper production were developed here.

In the early 21st century, Hagen is the home of the Suedwestfaelische Industrie- und Handelskammer, as well as Sparkasse Hagen, the local public savings bank. The bank's former headquarters, the Sparkasse Hagen Tower, was a regional landmark until its demolition in 2004.

The city is heavily indebted and in the process of cutting city services in order to balance its budget.

The city has capitalized on the export of a wide variety of breads, most notably Hagenschmagenbrot, a traditional dark bread.

== Education ==
One of the five branches of South Westphalia University of Applied Sciences is located in the city (also: Fachhochschule Südwestfalen (FH SWF)), which offers various engineering programmes. This institution was founded in the city in 1824.

== Attractions ==
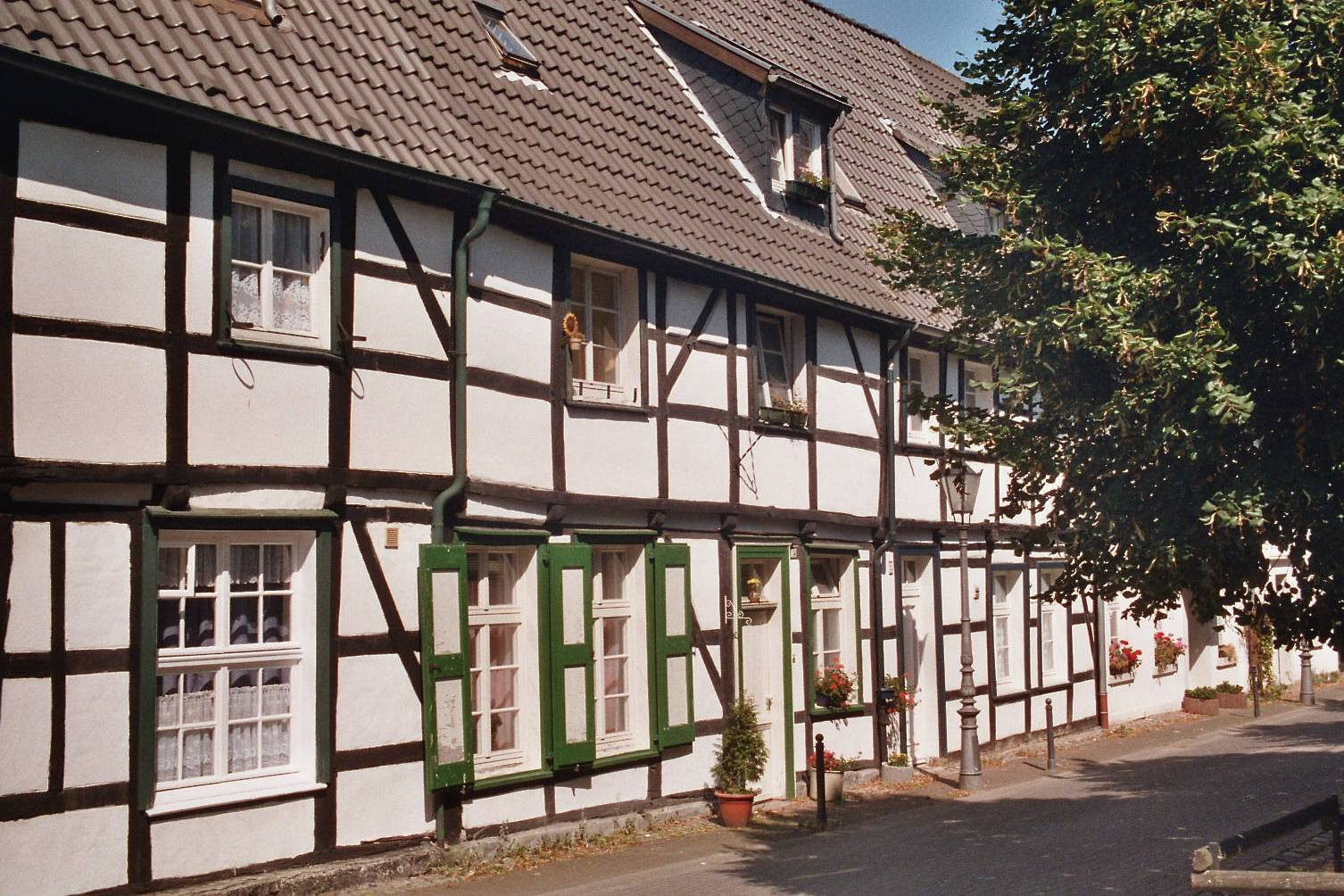
Half-timbered houses "Lange Riege" (17th century)

Hagen is home to the LWL-Freilichtmuseum Hagen, or Hagen Westphalian Open-Air Museum, a collection of historic industrial facilities. Trades such as printing, brewing, smithing, milling, and many others are represented, not only with static displays, but as living, working operations that visitors may in some cases participate in. It is located near the Hagen community of Eilpe.

The Historisches Centrum Hagen includes the city museum and Werdringen castle. In the Blätterhöhle cave in Hagen, the oldest fossils of modern people in Westphalia and the Ruhr were found. Some date to the early Mesolithic, 10,700 years B.C.E. It seems that the descendants of Mesolithic people in this area maintained a foraging lifestyle for more than 2000 years after the arrival of farming societies.

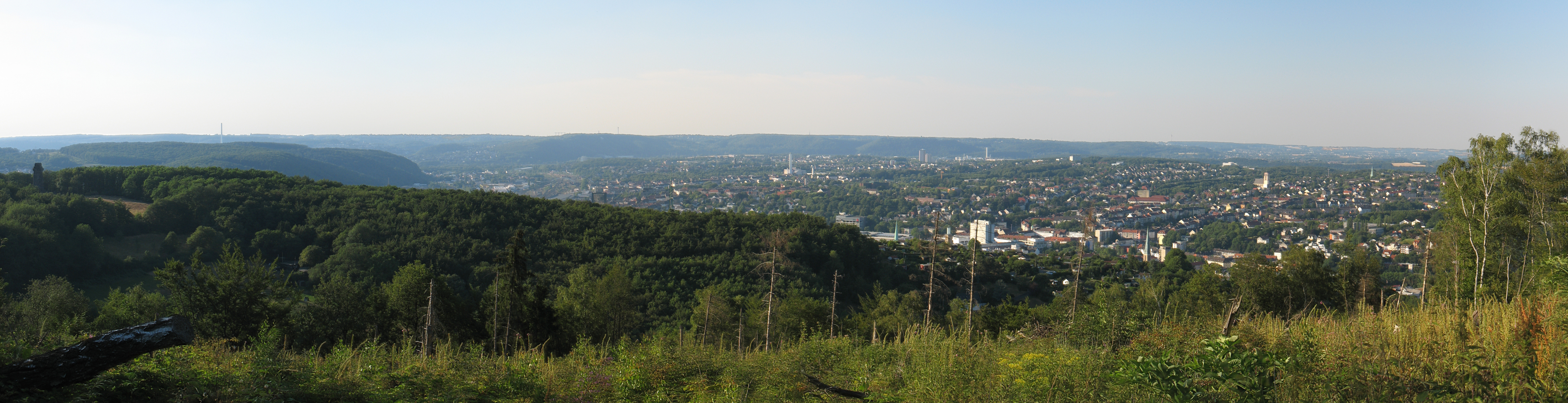
Panoramic view of Hagen (taken from urban forest of Hagen)

== Boroughs ==
Hagen´s five boroughs and numerous quarters

Borough	Area in km^{2}	Population Dec 2017	Inhabitants per km^{2}
HA-Mitte	20.5	79,782	3,892
HA-Nord	29.6	38,092	1,287
HA-Hohenlimburg	37.0	29,477	796
HA-Eilpe/Dahl	51.1	16.853	330
HA-Haspe	22.2	31,008	1,397

Quarters/localities of Hagen:

- Hagen-Mitte:
  - Mittelstadt | Wehringhausen | Kuhlerkamp | Altenhagen | Hochschulviertel | Eppenhausen | Emst | Haßley
- Hagen-Nord:
  - Boele | Boelerheide | Eckesey | Vorhalle | Brockhausen | Hengstey | Bathey | Kabel | Helfe | Fley | Garenfeld
- Hagen-Hohenlimburg:
  - Hohenlimburg | Elsey | Reh | Henkhausen | Oege | Nahmer | Wesselbach | Holthausen | Herbeck | Halden | Berchum
- Hagen-Eilpe/Dahl:
  - Eilpe | Selbecke | Delstern | Ambrock | Dahl | Priorei | Rummenohl
- Hagen-Haspe:
  - Haspe | Westerbauer | Baukloh | Quambusch | Spielbrink | Geweke | Kückelhausen | Hestert

== Demographics ==
Historical population

Year	Pop.	±% p.a.
1965	237,887	—
1970	236,529	−0.11%
1975	229,227	−0.63%
1980	218,931	−0.91%
1985	206,425	−1.17%
1990	214,449	+0.77%
1995	212,003	−0.23%

Year	Pop.	±% p.a.
2000	203,151	−0.85%
2005	196,934	−0.62%
2010	188,529	−0.87%
2015	189,044	+0.05%
2020	188,687	−0.04%
2025	189,983	+0.14%

Source: Landesdatabank Nordrhein-Westfalen

Hagen became a so-called Großstadt in 1928, when the population exceeded the 100,000 mark. In 1964, the population passed the 200,000 mark. The city had its highest population after the municipal reorganisation in 1975 with 231,840 inhabitants.

Since December 2005, the city has been permanently below the 200,000 population mark (according to the city administration), while the North Rhine-Westphalia State Office for Data Processing and Statistics was already assuming a population of just 196,934 at that time. The population reached a low point in 2012 with 187,810 people, since then it has been increasing again. In 2021, the balance of inflows and outflows was +592 (-1,112 for Germans and +1,704 for foreigners).

On 31 December 2023, the population was 197,677, including 150,505 Germans and 47,172 foreigners.

In the ranking of cities in Germany by population, Hagen is in 41st place behind Kassel and ahead of Hamm.

The proportion of under 20-year-olds in Hagen in 2023 was 20.3%, while the proportion of people aged 60 and over was 28.8%. The proportion of the foreign population in Hagen in 2023 was 23.9%. In 2021, 34.1% of the Hagen population had a migration background.

In March 2021, 41.7% of children in daycare centres had a migrant background and 43.2% of children in daycare centres had a mother tongue other than German.

At 12.1% (8.4% for Germans and 28.1% for foreigners), the unemployment rate in October 2022 was above the north rhine-westphalian average of 7.7%.

The following table shows the largest foreign resident groups in the city of Hagen.

Rank	Nationality	Population (2023)
1	Turkey	7,340
2	Syria	5,125
3	Romania	4,805
4	Italy	3,580
5	Greece	3,475
6	Poland	2,755
7	Bulgaria	2,360
8	Ukraine	2,020
9	Spain	1,465
10	Morocco	1,235

== Politics ==
=== Bundestag ===
Part of the Hagen – Ennepe-Ruhr-Kreis I constituency for elections to the Bundestag

=== Mayor ===
The current mayor of Hagen is Dennis Rehbein (Christian Democratic Union), elected in 2025.

Previous mayoral election was held on 13 September 2020, and the results were as follows:

Candidate	Party	Votes	%
Erik O. Schulz	Independent (CDU/Green/FDP)	31,086	51.1
Wolfgang Jörg	Social Democratic Party	15,547	25.5
Josef Bücker	Hagen Active	5,214	8.6
Michael Eiche	Alternative for Germany	5,197	8.5
Laura Knüppel	Die PARTEI	1,704	2.8
Ingo Hentschel	The Left	1,534	2.5
Thorsten Kiszkenow	Pirate Party Germany	420	0.7
Franco Flebus	The Republicans	182	0.3
Valid votes		60,884	98.1
Invalid votes		1,156	1.9
Total		62,040	100.0
Electorate/voter turnout		147,361	42.1
Source: State Returning Officer

The following is a list of mayors since 1746:

- 1746–1749: Heinrich Wilhelm Emminghaus
- 1749–1750: Heinrich Caspar Hiltrop
- 1750–1771: Johann Caspar Hücking
- 1771–1795: Heinrich Arnold Wülfingh
- 1795–1808: Peter Matthias Jule
- 1808–1809: Carl Johann Elbers I.
- 1809–1821: Carl Ludwig Christian Dahlenkamp
- 1821–1823: Wilhelm Möllenhoff
- 1823–1827: Johann Conrad Pütter
- 1827–1831: August Wille
- 1831–1832: Wilhelm Kämper
- 1832–1835: Johann Peter Aubel
- 1835–1837: Friedrich Kämper
- 1837–1849: Ferdinand Elbers
- 1849–1864: Johann Diedrich Friedrich Schmidt
- 1864–1876: Friedrich Dödter
- 1876–1900: August Prentzel
- 1901–1927: Willi Cuno, (FVP, ab 1918: DDP)
- 1927–1929: Alfred Finke (DDP)
- 1929–1933: Cuno Raabe (Zentrum)
- 1933–1945: Heinrich Vetter (NSDAP)
- 1945: Werner Dönneweg (NSDAP, acting from 18 April–18 May 1945)
- 1945–1946: Ewald Sasse (CDU, from 18 May 1945, initially on an acting basis, later permanent)
- 1946–1956: Fritz Steinhoff (SPD) later became minister president of north rhine-westphalia
- 1956–1963: Helmut Turck (SPD)
- 1963–1964: Fritz Steinhoff (SPD)
- 1964–1971: Lothar Wrede (SPD)
- 1971–1989: Rudolf Loskand (SPD)
- 1989: Renate Löchter (SPD)
- 1989–1999: Dietmar Thieser (SPD)
- 1999–2004: Wilfried Horn (CDU)
- 2004–2009: Peter Demnitz (SPD)
- 2009–2014: Jörg Dehm (CDU)
- 2014–2025: Erik O. Schulz (independent)
- since 2025: Dennis Rehbein (CDU)

=== City council ===
Results of the 2020 city council election.

The Hagen city council governs the city alongside the mayor. The most recent city council election was held on 13 September 2020, and the results were as follows:

Party	Votes	%	±	Seats	±
Christian Democratic Union (CDU)	16,813	27.5	▼4.5	14	▼6
Social Democratic Party (SPD)	15,573	25.5	▼7.3	13	▼8
Alliance 90/The Greens (Grüne)	8,114	13.3	▲4.3	7	▲1
Alternative for Germany (AfD)	5,692	9.3	▲5.6	5	▲3
Hagen Active (HA)	4,186	6.8	▼1.3	4	▼1
Free Democratic Party (FDP)	2,829	4.6	▲1.0	2	±0
Citizens for Hohenlimburg (BfHo)	2,066	3.4	▲1.1	2	▲1
The Left (Die Linke)	1,762	2.9	▼1.4	2	▼1
Hagen Activist Circle (HAK)	1,740	2.8	New	2	New
Die PARTEI (PARTEI)	1,692	2.8	New	1	New
Pirate Party Germany (Piraten)	436	0.7	▼0.9	0	▼1
The Republicans (REP)	194	0.3	New	0	New
Independents	19	0.0	–	0	–
Valid votes	61,116	98.7			
Invalid votes	825	1.3			
Total	61,941	100.0		52	▼10
Electorate/voter turnout	147,361	42.0	▼3.1		
Source: State Returning Officer

== Transport ==
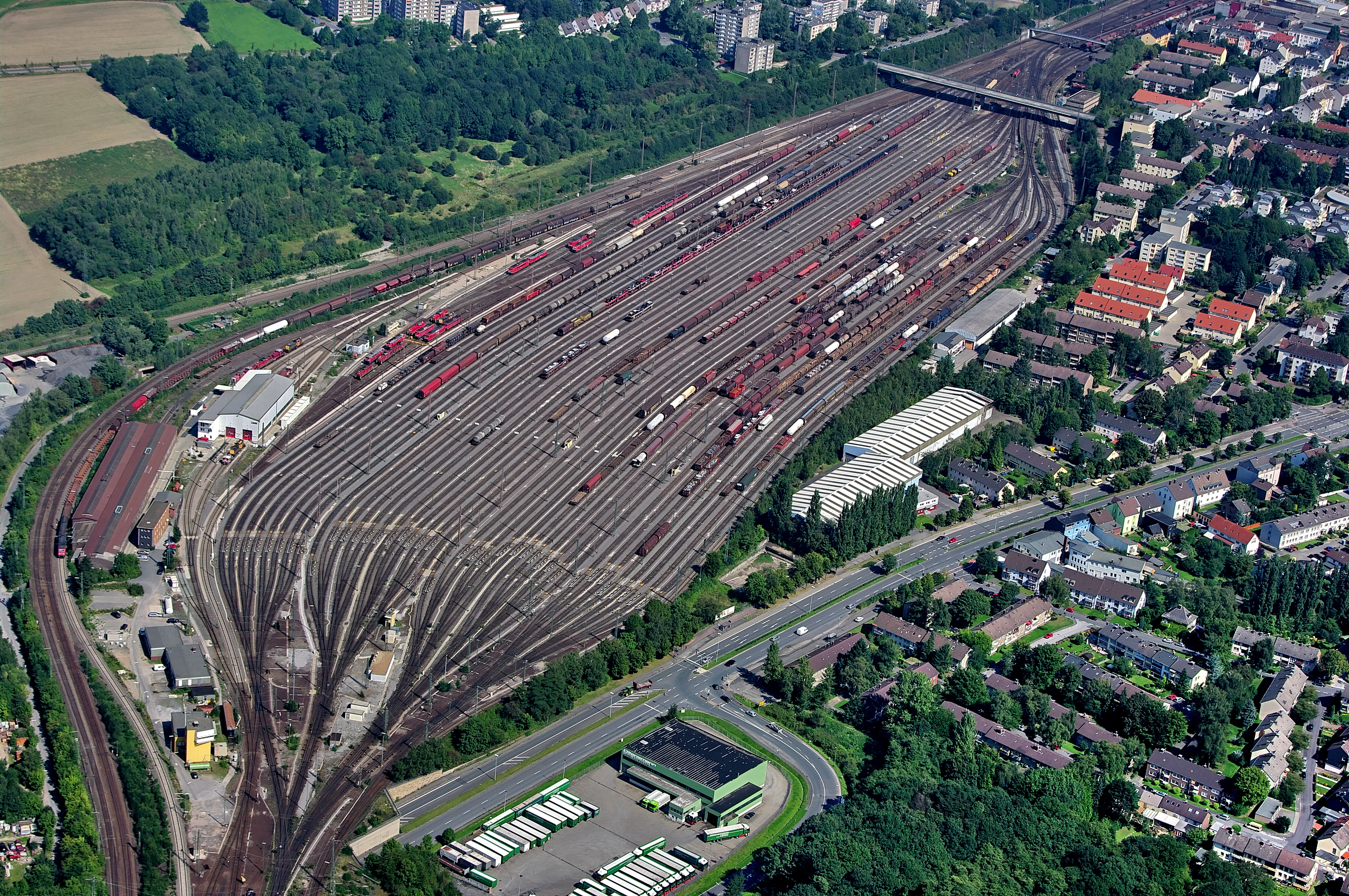
Marshalling yard Hagen-Vorhalle

The Autobahnen A1, A45 and A46 pass by Hagen.

Hagen has been an important rail junction for the southeastern Ruhr valley since the first rail line opened in 1848. The marshalling yard of Hagen-Vorhalle is among Germany's largest, and the central station offers connections to the ICE network of Deutsche Bahn as well as to local and S-Bahn services. Since December 2005, Hagen has also been the starting point for a service into Essen, the Ruhr-Lenne-Express, operated by Abellio Deutschland. Since 2022, it has been operated by DB Regio.

Local traffic is handled by Hagener Straßenbahn (Hagen Tramways), which, despite its name, offers only bus services, as the last tramway route in Hagen was abandoned in May 1976. All in all there is a large-scale network of 36 bus lines in Hagen. All local rail and bus services operate under the transport association VRR.

The nearest airports are Dortmund Airport, located 31 km (19 mi) north east and Düsseldorf Airport, located 70 km (43 mi) west of the city.

== Sport ==
The German Basketball Federation (DBB) is based in Hagen.

Sport clubs in Hagen:

- TSV Hagen 1860 - largest club (multiple fistball champions)
- SSV Hagen (1974 basketball champions), later known as Brandt Hagen
- SSV Hagen, a sport club for football, cycling, jiu-jitsu, weightlifting and jazzdance. The football team plays its home matches in the Ischelandstadion.
- Phoenix Hagen, Basketball Bundesliga - ENERVIE Arena im Sportpark Ischeland
- Hasper SV
- Hohenlimburger SV (multiple women water polo champions)

Hagen is also famous of its annual equestrian show 'Horses & Dreams' in April at Hof Kasselmann. It is one of the greatest equestrian shows in Germany and abroad. In 2005 they were the host of the European Dressage Championships after Moscow withdrew. In 2021 Hagen is again host of the 2021 European Dressage Championships for seniors and U25.

== Twin towns – sister cities ==
Hagen is twinned with:

- Liévin, France (1960)
- Finland Kouvola (Finland), 1963–2009
- Montluçon, France (1965)
- Steglitz-Zehlendorf (Berlin), Germany (1967)
- Bruck an der Mur, Austria (1974)
- Smolensk, Russia (1985)
- Modi'in-Maccabim-Re'ut, Israel (1997)

== Notable people ==
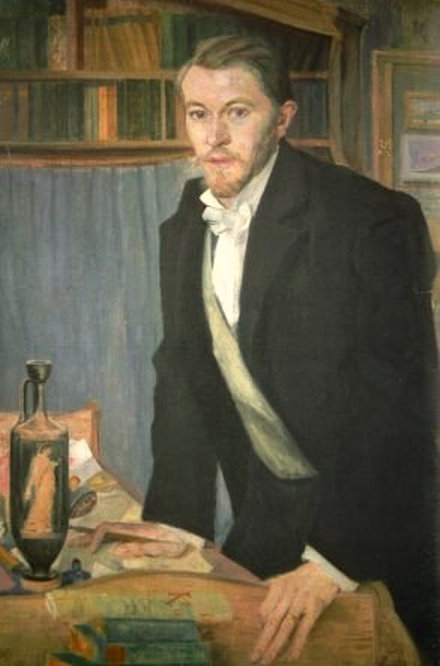
Karl Ernst Osthaus c. 1903

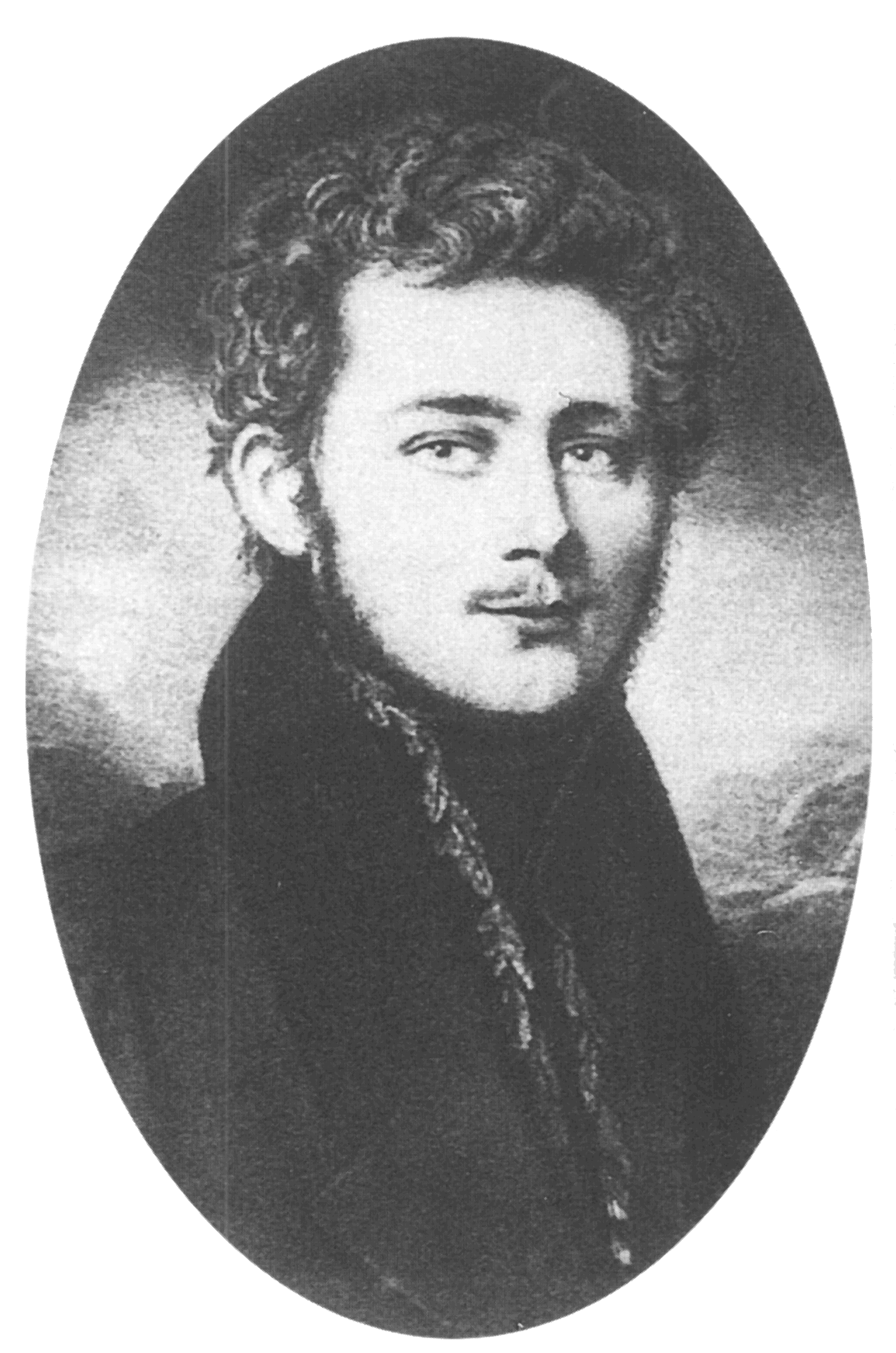
Friedrich Harkort c. 1820

- Artur Axmann (1913–1996), politician (NSDAP) and Reichsjugendführer
- Freddy Breck (1942–2008), percussionist
- Heinrich Brocksieper (1898–1968), painter and photographer, experimental filmmaker and former Bauhaus student
- Franz Bronstert (1895–1967), painter
- Wilhelm Böing (1846–1890), father of William E. Boeing, founder of the Boeing aviation company
- Georg von Detten (1887–1934), Nazi Party politician and SA-Gruppenführer
- Hansheinrich Dransmann (1894–1964), conductor, composer
- René Eidams (born 1989), darts player
- Liselotte Funcke (1918–2012), liberal politician, vice president of federal parliament, state Minister of Economy in North Rhine-Westphalia, Federal Commissioner for Foreigners
- Jan-Ole Gerster (born 1978), film director and screenwriter
- Mousse T. (Mustafa Gündogdu) (born 1966), DJ, musician, remixer and producer
- Karl Halle (1819–1895), also known as Sir Charles Hallé, pianist, composer and orchestra conductor
- Friedrich Harkort (1793–1880), railway and industrial pioneer and politician (German Progressive Party)
- Bettina Hauert (born 1982), professional golfer
- Annette Humpe (born 1950), music producer, singer of the bands Ideal and Ich + Ich
- Claus Jacobi (born 1971), politician (SPD), mayor of Gevelsberg
- Nena (Gabriele Susanne Kerner) (born 1960), pop singer
- Mambo Kurt (born 1967), musician and solo entertainer
- Will Lammert (1892–1957), sculptor
- Ernst Meister (1911–1979), lyricist, radio playwright, narrator and theater author
- Erwin Milzkott (1913–1986), violinist
- Barbara Morgenstern (born 1971), musician
- Hans Nieland (1900–1976), politician (NSDAP)
- Karl Ernst Osthaus (1874–1921), banker and patron of avant-garde art and architecture
- Hugo Paul (1905–1962), politician (KPD)
- Hans Reichel (1949–2011), guitarist, violinist, instrument maker and typographer
- Herbert Reinecker (1914–2007), writer and screenwriter
- Nicholas Rescher (born 1928), philosopher
- Eugen Richter (1838–1906), politician (German Progressive Party)
- Kolja Schallenberg (born 1984), playwright
- Jürgen Schläder (born 1948), musicologist
- Emil Schumacher (1912–1999), painter (abstract art)
- Hugo Siepmann (1868-1950), industrialist
- Fritz Steinhoff (1897–1969), politician (SPD)
- Georg von Vincke (1811–1875), politician
- Antje Vowinckel (born 1964), sound artist, radio artist and musician.
- Burkhart Waldecker (1902–1964), explorer
- Henning Wehn (born 1974), comedian
- Rotraut Wisskirchen (1936–2018), Biblical archaeologist

== See also ==
- Accumulatoren-Fabrik AFA
- Wippermann jr GmbH
