= Ennepe-Ruhr-Kreis =

Coordinates: 51°21′N 7°18′E

- District
- Flag Coat of arms
- Country: Germany
- State: North Rhine-Westphalia
- Adm. region: Arnsberg
- Founded: 1 August 1929
- Capital: Schwelm

Government
  - District admin.: Arnim Brux (SPD)

Area
  - Total: 408.44 km^{2} (157.70 sq mi)

Population (31 December 2025)
  - Total: 313,003
  - Density: 766.34/km^{2} (1,984.8/sq mi)
- Time zone: UTC+01:00 (CET)
  - Summer (DST): UTC+02:00 (CEST)
- Vehicle registration: EN, WIT
- Website: www.enkreis.de

The Ennepe-Ruhr-Kreis is a district in the center of North Rhine-Westphalia, Germany. It is part of the southern Ruhr urban area and has ca. 324,000 inhabitants (2012). The district's seat (capital city) is Schwelm; the largest of its nine towns is Witten.

== Geography ==
The name of the district describes its geographical location – it is located in the valleys of the rivers Ruhr and Ennepe. Geologically it is part of the north-eastern Rhenish Massif, a Mittelgebirge landscape; only small parts of Witten belong to the flat Westphalian Lowland.

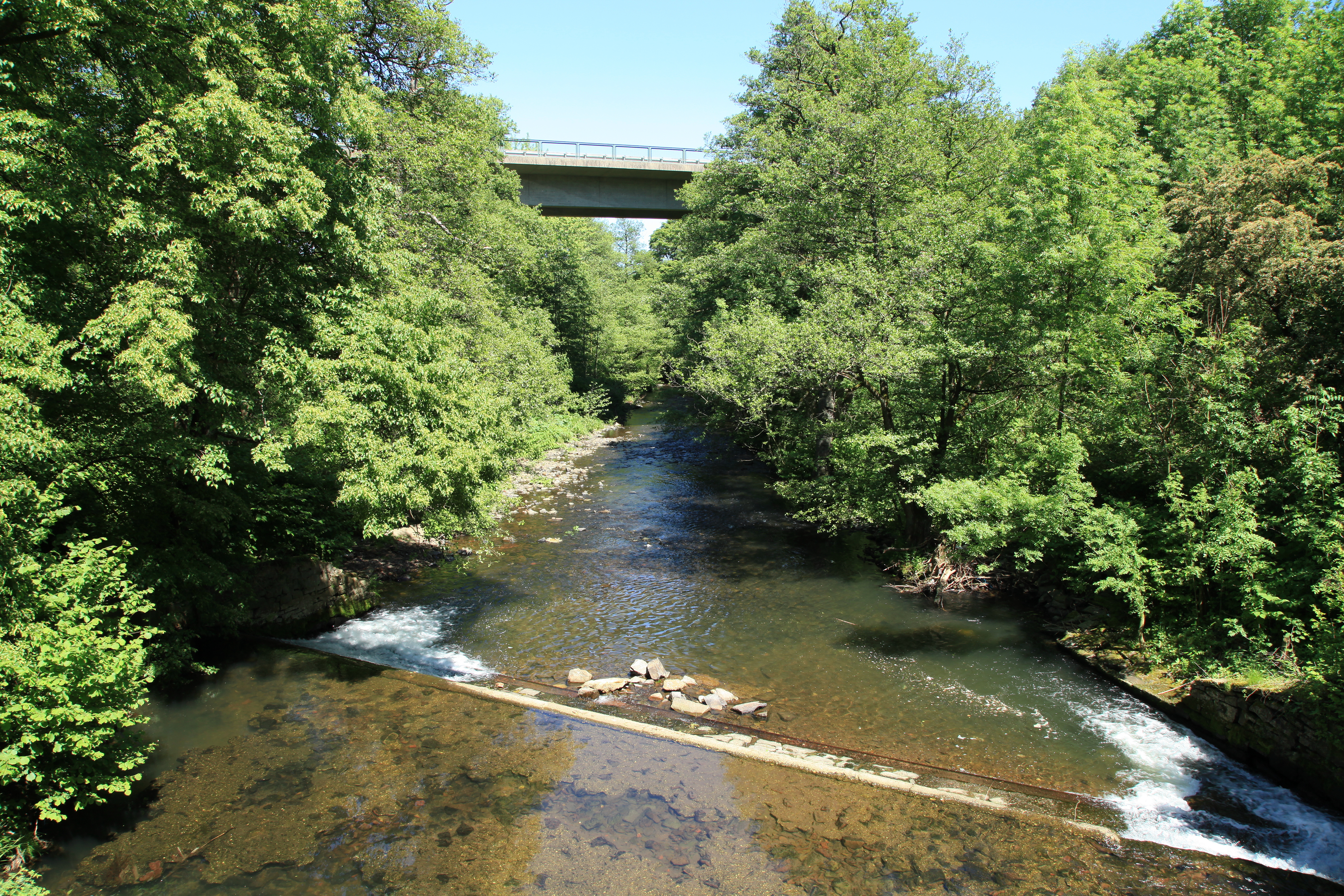
Ennepe in Gevelsberg

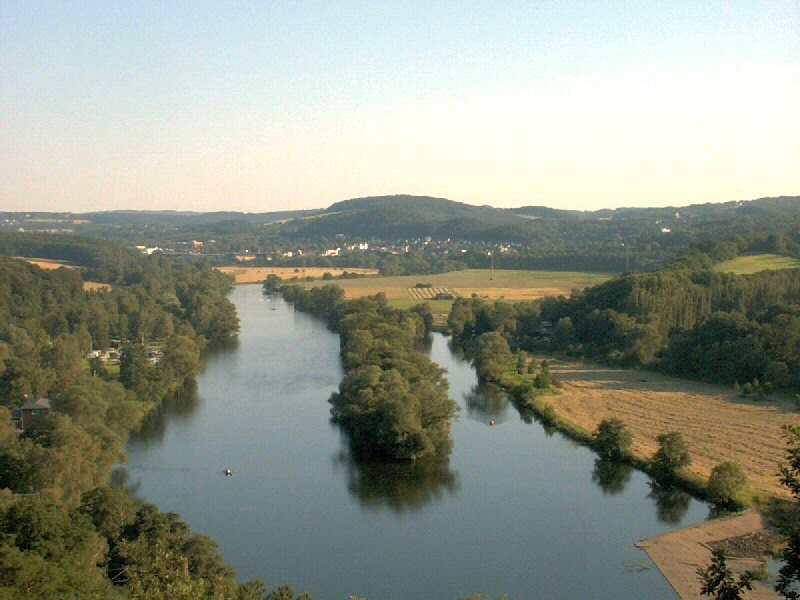
Ruhr valley in Witten

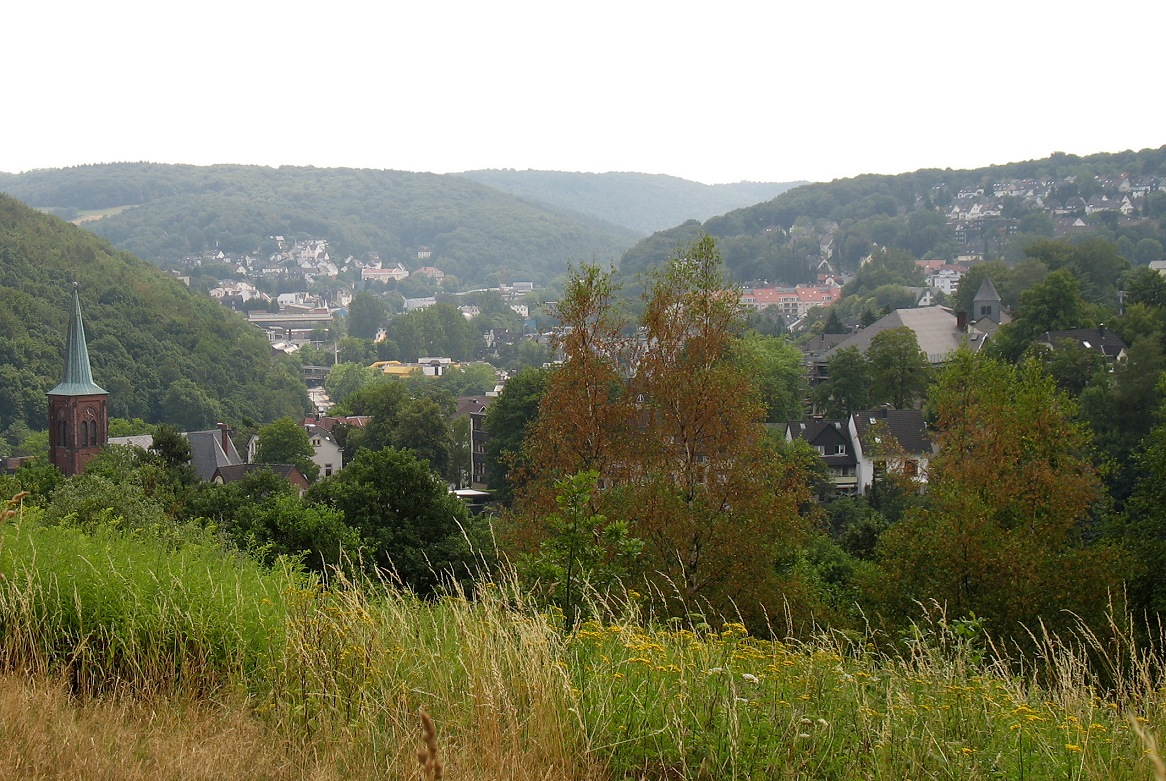
wooded hills in Ennepetal

=== Municipalities ===
The district consists of nine municipalities, all entitled "Stadt" (town or city).

| Municipality | Area |
|---|---|
| 1. Breckerfeld | 58.78 km^{2} (22.70 sq mi) |
| 2. Ennepetal | 57.43 km^{2} (22.17 sq mi) |
| 3. Gevelsberg | 26.29 km^{2} (10.15 sq mi) |
| 4. Hattingen | 71.40 km^{2} (27.57 sq mi) |
| 5. Herdecke | 22.40 km^{2} (8.65 sq mi) |
| 6. Schwelm | 20.50 km^{2} (7.92 sq mi) |
| 7. Sprockhövel | 47.80 km^{2} (18.46 sq mi) |
| 8. Wetter (Ruhr) | 31.47 km^{2} (12.15 sq mi) |
| 9. Witten | 72.37 km^{2} (27.94 sq mi) |
| Ennepe-Ruhr-Kreis, total | 408.44 km^{2} (157.70 sq mi) |

=== Adjacent cities and districts ===
The Ennepe-Ruhr-Kreis is bounded by (from the north and clockwise) the district-free cities of Bochum, Dortmund and Hagen, the districts of Märkischer Kreis (with Schalksmühle and Halver) and Oberbergischer Kreis (with Radevormwald), the city of Wuppertal, the district of Mettmann (with Velbert) and the city of Essen.

Largest groups of foreigners :

| Turkey | 6,474 |
| Italy | 3,416 |
| Poland | 2,655 |
| Greece | 1,864 |
| Syria | 1,433 |
| Portugal | 1,200 |

== History ==
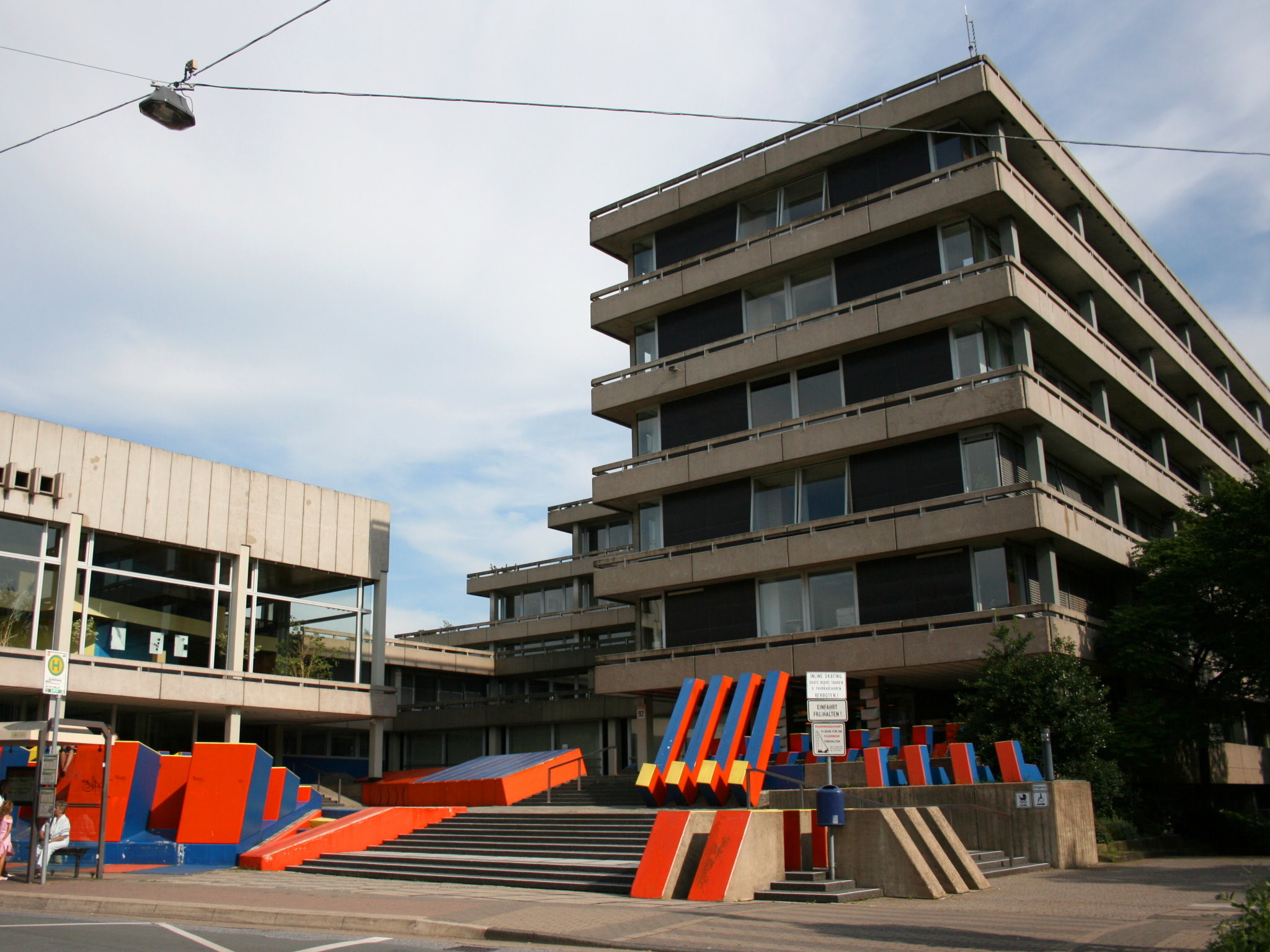
The Kreishaus (district administration building) in Schwelm

The district was created in 1929 by merging the former district of Schwelm with parts of the former districts of Hattingen and Hagen. In 1970 and 1975 it was modified a bit during the reorganization of the districts in North Rhine-Westphalia; most notable was the inclusion of the previously independent city of Witten in 1975.

== Politics ==
Results of the 2020 district administrator election

Since 2015, the district administrator of the Ennepe-Ruhr-Kreis has been Olaf Schade of the Social Democratic Party (SPD). In the most recent election on 13 September 2020, Schade was re-elected with the support of the SPD and The Greens, winning 61.6% of votes against Oliver Flüshöh, who was nominated by the Christian Democratic Union (CDU) and Free Democratic Party (FDP).

=== District council ===
Results of the 2020 district council election

The Ennepe-Ruhr-Kreis council governs the district alongside the administrator. The most recent district council election was held on 13 September 2020, and the results were as follows:

| Party | Votes | % | +/- | Seats | +/- |
|---|---|---|---|---|---|
| Social Democratic Party (SPD) | 42,403 | 31.3 | ▼8.1 | 19 | ▼7 |
| Christian Democratic Union (CDU) | 36,275 | 26.8 | ▼1.9 | 16 | ▼3 |
| Alliance 90/The Greens (Grüne) | 28,175 | 20.8 | ▲7.8 | 13 | ▲5 |
| Free Democratic Party (FDP) | 7,864 | 5.8 | ▲1.3 | 4 | ▲1 |
| Alternative for Germany (AfD) | 7,250 | 5.4 | ▲1.8 | 3 | ▲1 |
| The Left (Die Linke) | 5,174 | 3.8 | ▼1.6 | 2 | ▼2 |
| Pirate Party Germany (Piraten) | 3,326 | 2.5 | ▲0.2 | 1 | ▼1 |
| Free Voters (FW-EN) | 2,893 | 2.1 | ▼0.6 | 1 | ▼1 |
| Citizens' Forum (BF) | 2,224 | 1.6 | New | 1 | New |
| Valid votes | 135,584 | 98.4 | | | |
| Invalid votes | 2,199 | 1.6 | | | |
| Total | 137,783 | 100.0 | | 60 | ▼6 |
| Electorate/voter turnout | 267,170 | 51.6 | | | |
Source: District Ennepe-Ruhr

=== State Landtag ===
In the Landtag of North Rhine-Westphalia, the Ennepe-Ruhr-Kreis is divided between three constituencies: 104 Hagen II – Ennepe-Ruhr-Kreis III (containing Breckerfeld, Ennepetal, and Gevelsberg), 105 Ennepe-Ruhr-Kreis I (Hattingen, Schwelm, Sprockhövel, and Wetter), and 106 Ennepe-Ruhr-Kreis II (Herdecke and Witten). In the 2017–22 parliamentary term, all three constituencies were held by the SPD. Hagen II – Ennepe-Ruhr-Kreis III was represented by Falk Heinrichs, Ennepe-Ruhr-Kreis I by Rainer Bovermann, and Ennepe-Ruhr-Kreis II by Nadja Büteführ.

=== Federal parliament ===
In the Bundestag, the Ennepe-Ruhr-Kreis is divided between two constituencies: 138 Hagen – Ennepe-Ruhr-Kreis I (Breckerfeld, Gevelsberg, Schwelm, and Ennepetal) and 139 Ennepe-Ruhr-Kreis II (Hattingen, Herdecke, Sprockhövel, Wetter, and Witten). In the 20th Bundestag, both are held by the SPD. Hagen – Ennepe-Ruhr-Kreis I is represented by Timo Schisanowski, and Ennepe-Ruhr-Kreis II by Axel Echeverria.

== Coat of arms ==
In the middle of the coat of arms there is the checked red-white bar of the County of Mark, which owned the area in medieval times. The two wavy lines above and below depict the two rivers which gave the district its name, the Ruhr and the Ennepe.
