= European route E40 =

Road in trans-European E-road network

E40

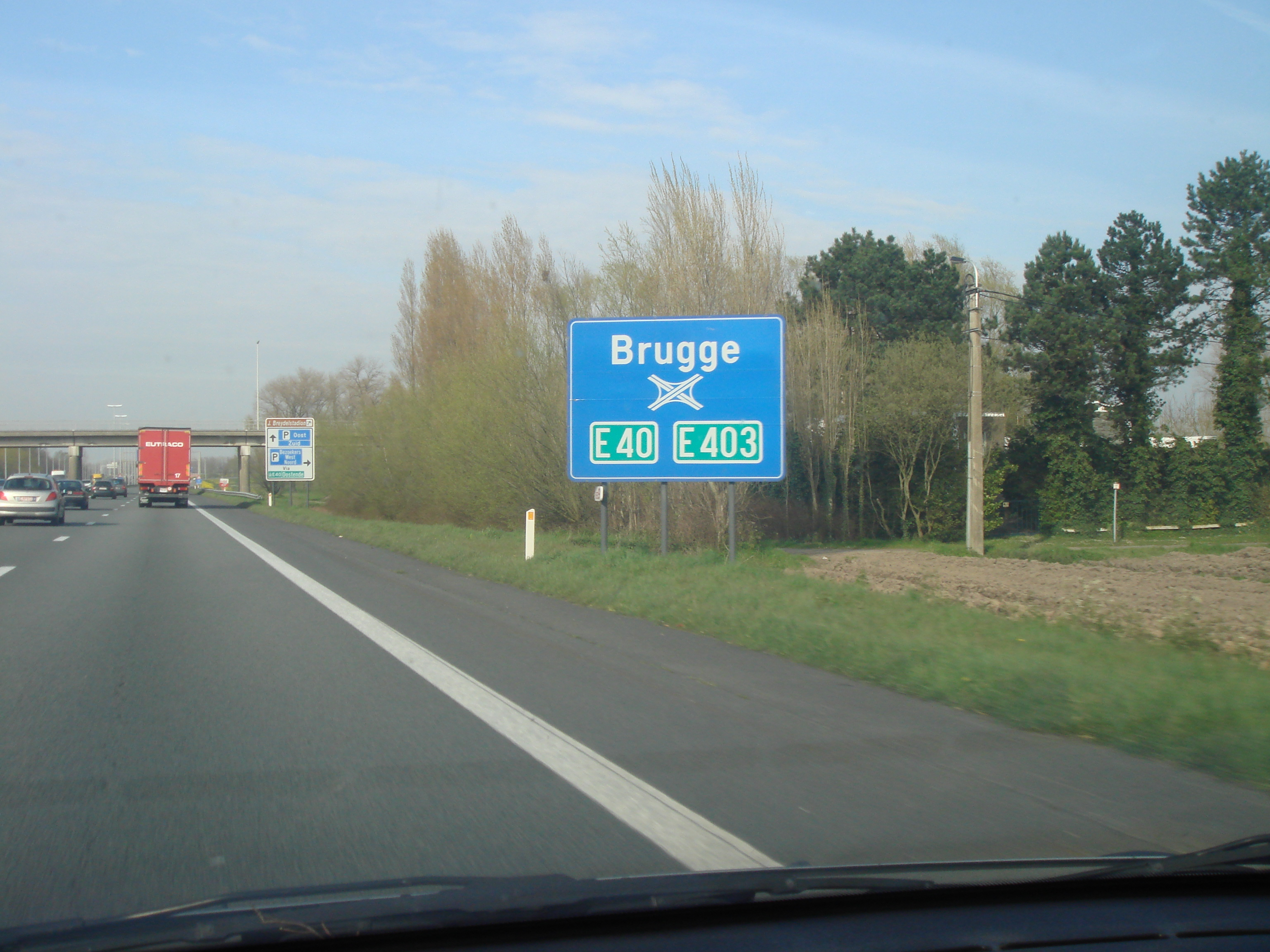
- E40 interchange near Bruges, Belgium

Route information
- Length: 8,641 km (5,369 mi)

Major junctions
- West end: E15 in Calais, France
- E25 in Liège, Belgium; E35 in Cologne, Germany; E45 in Kirchheim, Germany; E55 in Dresden, Germany; E65 in Legnica, Poland; E75 in Mysłowice, Poland; E85 in Dubno, Ukraine; E95 in Kyiv, Ukraine; E50 in Debaltseve, Ukraine; E60 / E004 in Bukhara, Uzbekistan
- East end: Ridder, Kazakhstan

Location
- Countries: France, Belgium, Germany, Poland, Ukraine, Russia, Kazakhstan, Uzbekistan, Turkmenistan, Kyrgyzstan

Highway system
- International E-road network; A Class; B Class
← E39	→ E41

European route E40 (E40) is a European route connecting Calais in France with Ridder in Kazakhstan near the border with Russia and China. 8,641 kilometres (5,369 miles) long, it is the longest route in the International E-road network. A different route, connecting Calais and Ridder, is about 2,000 kilometres (1,200 miles) shorter, mostly using the E30 via Berlin, Moscow, and Omsk. The E40 differs from that route in order to provide additional direct east–west access to Uzbekistan, Turkmenistan, and Kyrgyzstan, with a combined population base approaching 50 million people as of 2021.

From Dresden to Kyiv, it forms part of Pan-European Corridor III.

Since the start of the Russo-Ukrainian War in 2014, parts of the road in eastern Ukraine have been under the control of the separatist Donetsk People's Republic and Luhansk People's Republic. During the Russian invasion of Ukraine, Russia took direct control of the areas in Donbas.

== Route ==
=== France ===
- A 16: Calais (E15 / E402) - Dunkirk - Ghyvelde

=== Belgium ===
- A18: Adinkerke - Veurne - Jabbeke (E404)
- A10: Jabbeke (E404) - Bruges (E403) - Gent (E17) - Brussels (E19)
- R0 (Brussels Ring): Brussels (E19 Towards E411)
- A3: Brussels - Leuven (E314) - Liège (E25 / E42 / E313, Towards E46) - Verviers (E42) - Lichtenbusch (E421)

=== Germany ===
- A 44: Aachen (E 314)
- A 4: Aachen (E 314) - Cologne (E 31 / E 35, Towards E 29 / E 37) - Olpe (E 41)
- A 45: Olpe (start of concurrency with E 41) - Siegen - Gießen (E 44, end of concurrency with E 41)
- B 49: Gießen (E 41 / E 44)
- B 429: Gießen
- A 480: Gießen (E 451)
- A 5: Gießen (E 451) - Bad Hersfeld (E 45)
- A 7: Bad Hersfeld (E 45)
- A 4: Bad Hersfeld (E 45) - Eisenach - Erfurt - Zwickau (E 49 / E 51 / E 40) - Chemnitz (E 441) - Dresden (E 55) - Görlitz

=== Poland ===
- A 4: Zgorzelec - Bolesławiec (E36) - Legnica (E65) - Wrocław (E67) - Opole - Gliwice - Katowice - Mysłowice (E75, start of concurrency with E462) - Kraków (E77, end of concurrency with E462) - Rzeszów (E371) - Korczowa

=== Ukraine ===
- M 10: Krakovets - Lviv ( E372 E471)
- M 06: Lviv - Dubno (E85) - Rivne - Zhytomyr (E583) - Kyiv (E95 / E101)
- M 03: Kyiv (E95 / E101) - Lubny - Poltava (E584) - Kharkiv (E105) - Sloviansk - Debaltseve (E50)
- M 30: Debaltseve (E50) - Luhansk - Izvaryne

=== Russia ===
- R260: Kamensk-Shakhtinsky (E40) - Volgograd (E119)
- R 22: Volgograd (start of concurrency with E119) - Astrakhan (end of concurrency E119)
- 12A-235: Astrakhan - Krasny Yar

=== Kazakhstan (west) ===
- A 27: Kotyaevka - Atyrau (start of concurrency with E121) - Dossor
- A 33: Dossor - Beyneu (end of concurrency with E121)
- P 1: Beyneu (E121) - Akjigit - Border with Uzbekistan

=== Uzbekistan (west) ===
- A380 A380 Road: Border with Kazakhstan - Karakalpakstan - Qo'ng'irot - Xojeli - Nukus
- A381 A381 Road: Xojeli - Border with Turkmenistan

=== Turkmenistan ===
- Border with Uzbekistan - Konye-Urgench - Daşoguz ( E003)

=== Uzbekistan (east) ===
- 4P159 4P159 Road: Border with Turkmenistan - Shovot - Urgench
- 4P156 4P156 Road: Urgench - Hazorasp - A380
- A380 A380 Road: 4P156 - Bukhara ( E60 E004)
- M37 M37 Road: Bukhara ( E60 E004) - Navoiy - Samarqand ( E005)
- M39 M39 Road: Samarkand - Jizzax - Sardoba
- A373 A373 Road: Sardoba - Oqoltin
- M34 M34 Road: Oqoltin - Sirdaryo
- M39 M39 Road: Sirdaryo (start of concurrency with E123) - Chinoz - Tashkent ( E007) -G‘ishtko‘prik - Border of Kazakhstan

=== Kazakhstan (middle) ===
- A 2: Zhibek Zholy - Shymkent (end of concurrency with E123) - Taraz - Merki (Note: The A2 A-2 highway hasn't been fully built.)
- M 39: Merki - Chaldovar

=== Kyrgyzstan ===
- ЭМ-03 ЭМ-03 Road: Border of Kazakhstan - Chaldovar - Kara-Balta ( E010)
- ЭМ-04 ЭМ-04 Road: Kara-Balta ( E010) - Bishkek (Start of Concurrency with E125)
- ЭМ-02 ЭМ-02 Road: Bishkek Bypass
- ЭМ-01 ЭМ-01 Road: Bishkek - Border of Kazakhstan

=== Kazakhstan (east) ===
- A 2: Korday - Almaty (E012, end of concurrency with E125)
- A 3: Almaty (E125 / E012) - Sary-Ozek (E013) - Taldykorgan - Usharal (E014) - Ayagoz - Qalbatau (E127) - Öskemen
- A 10: Öskemen - Sekisovka
- A 9: Sekisovka - Ridder

== Gallery ==
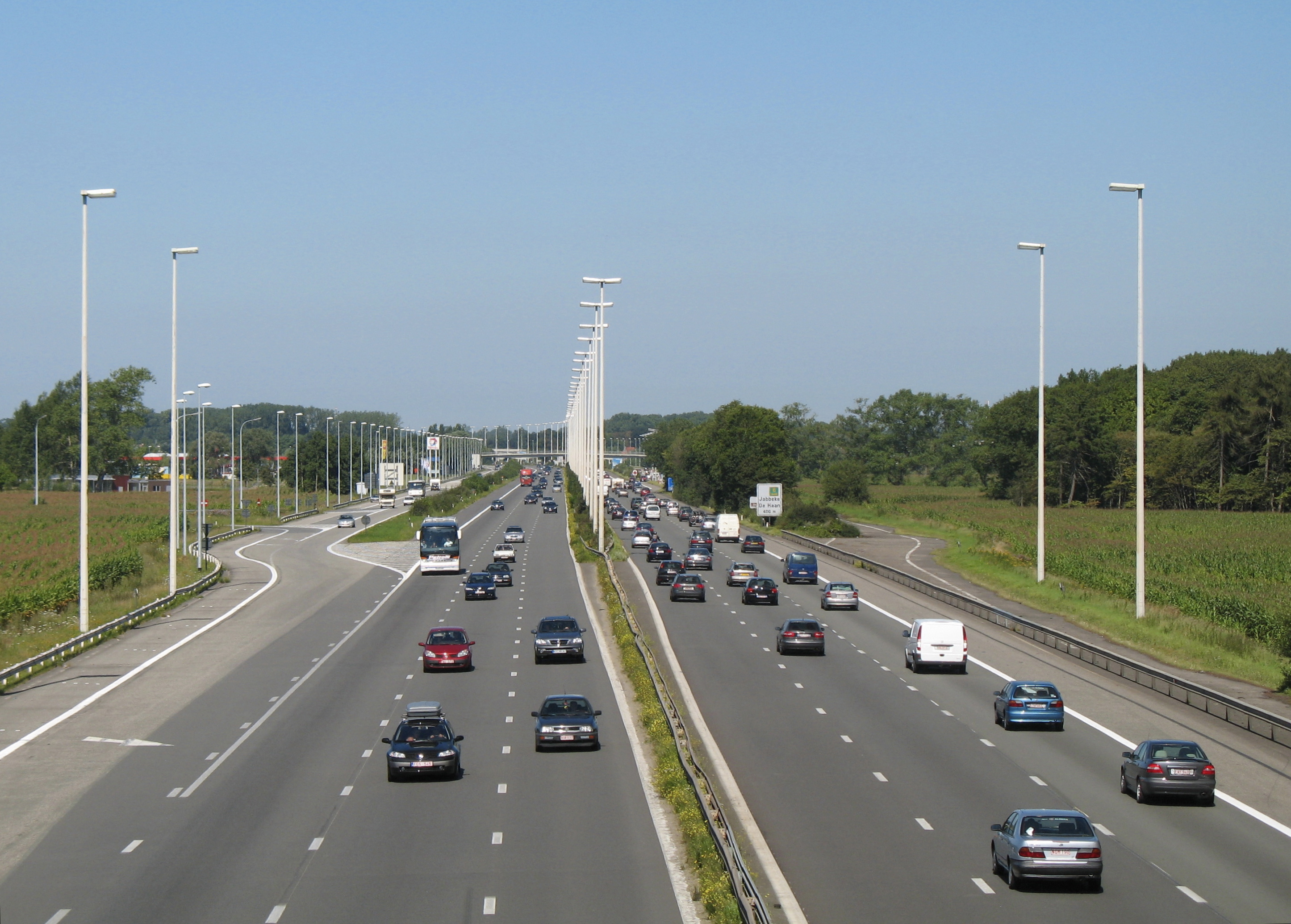
At Jabbeke in Belgium

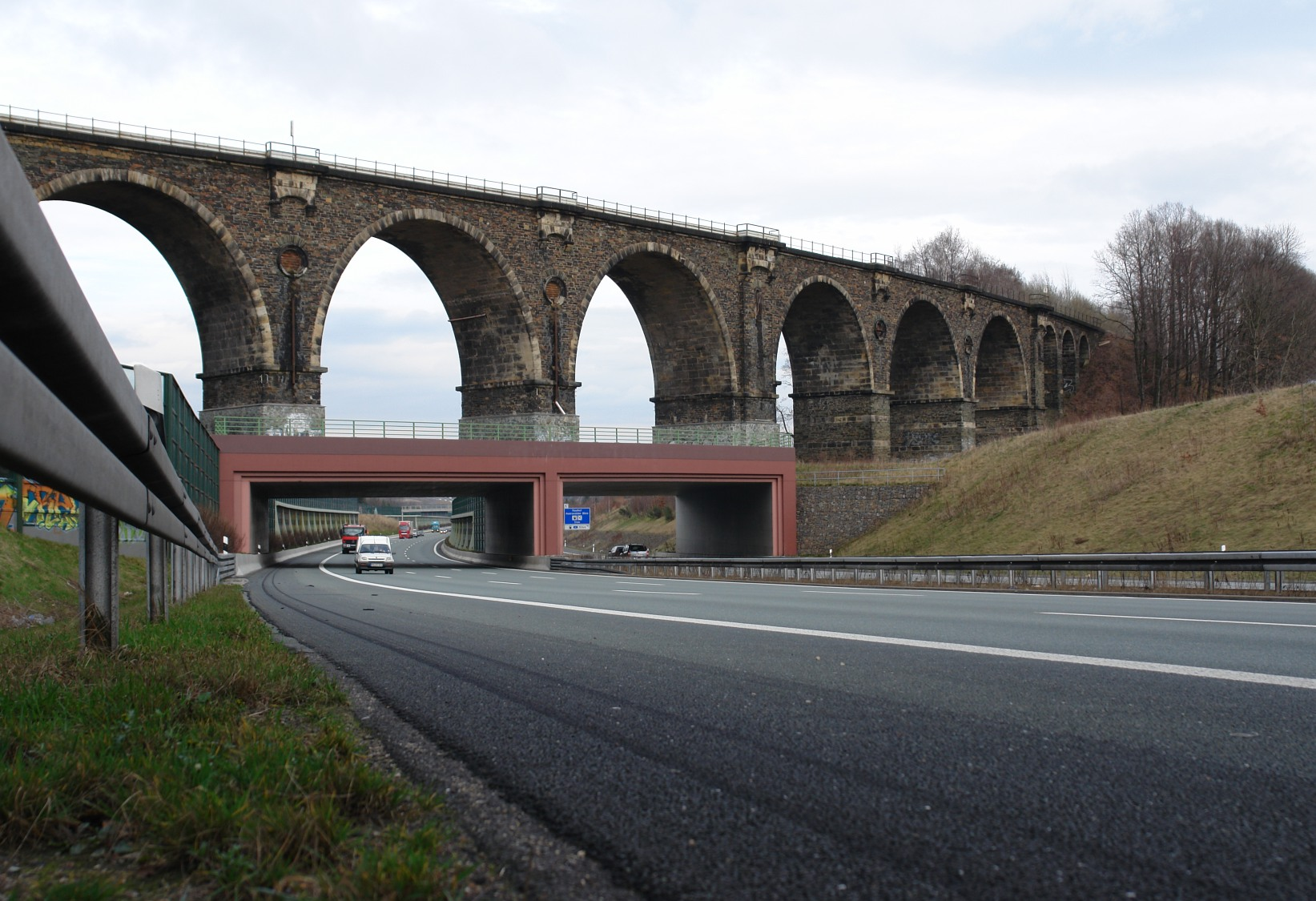
Crossing a railway at Chemnitz in eastern Germany

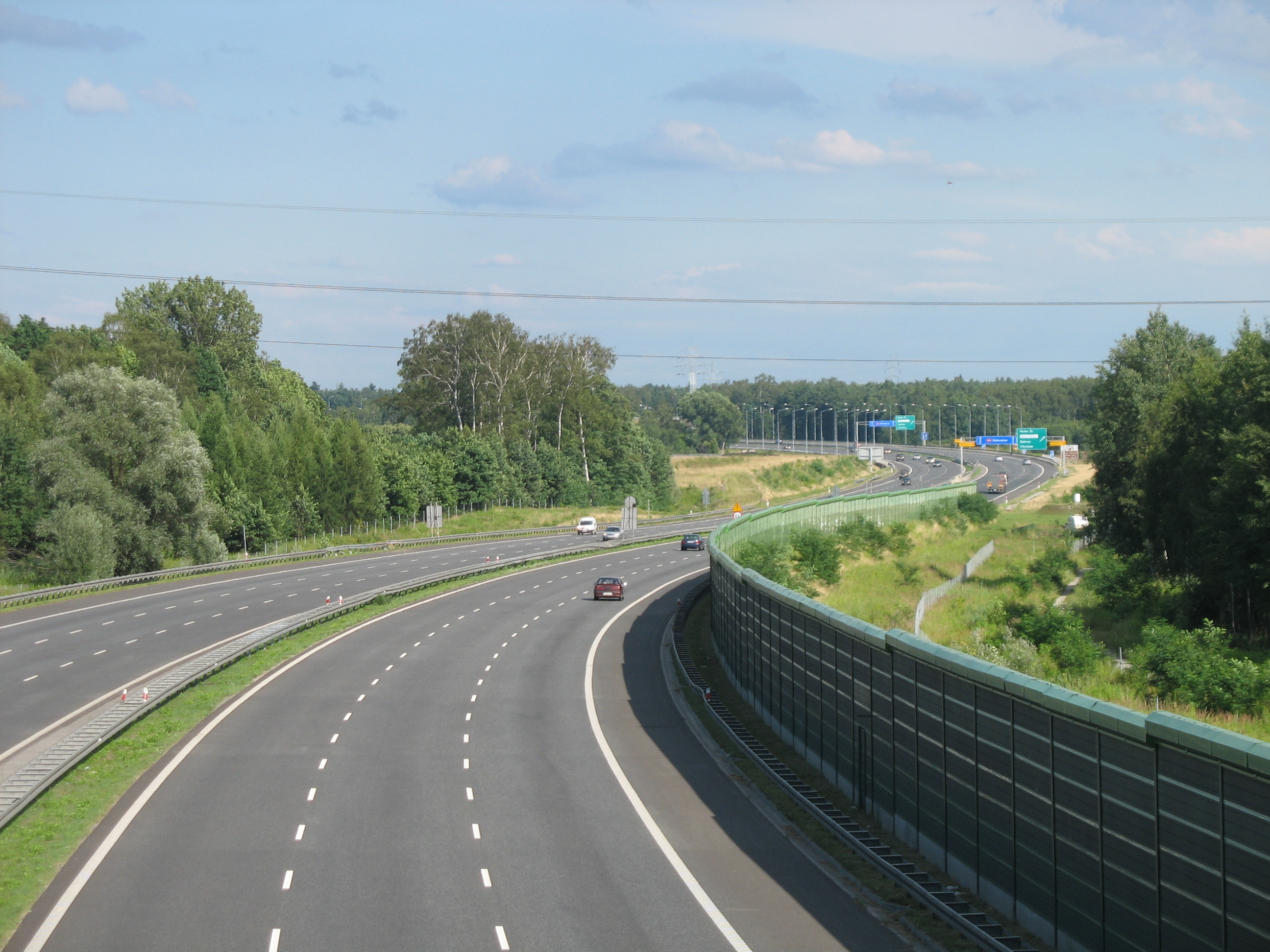
at Zabrze in Upper Silesian Industrial Region in Poland

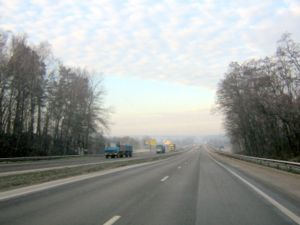
E40 road on Ukrainian highway Kyiv-Zhytomyr

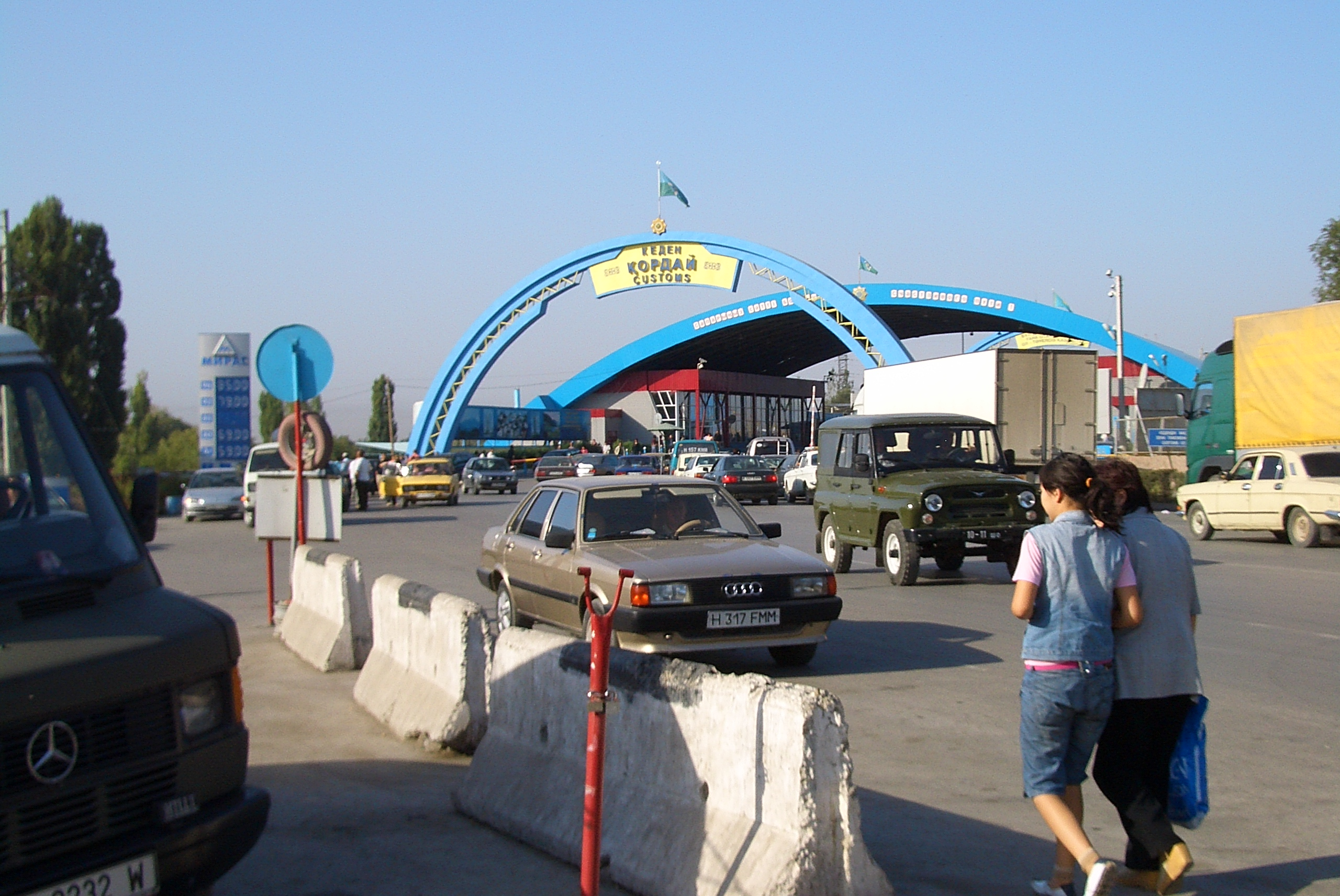
On Kazakh-Kyrgyz border at Korday

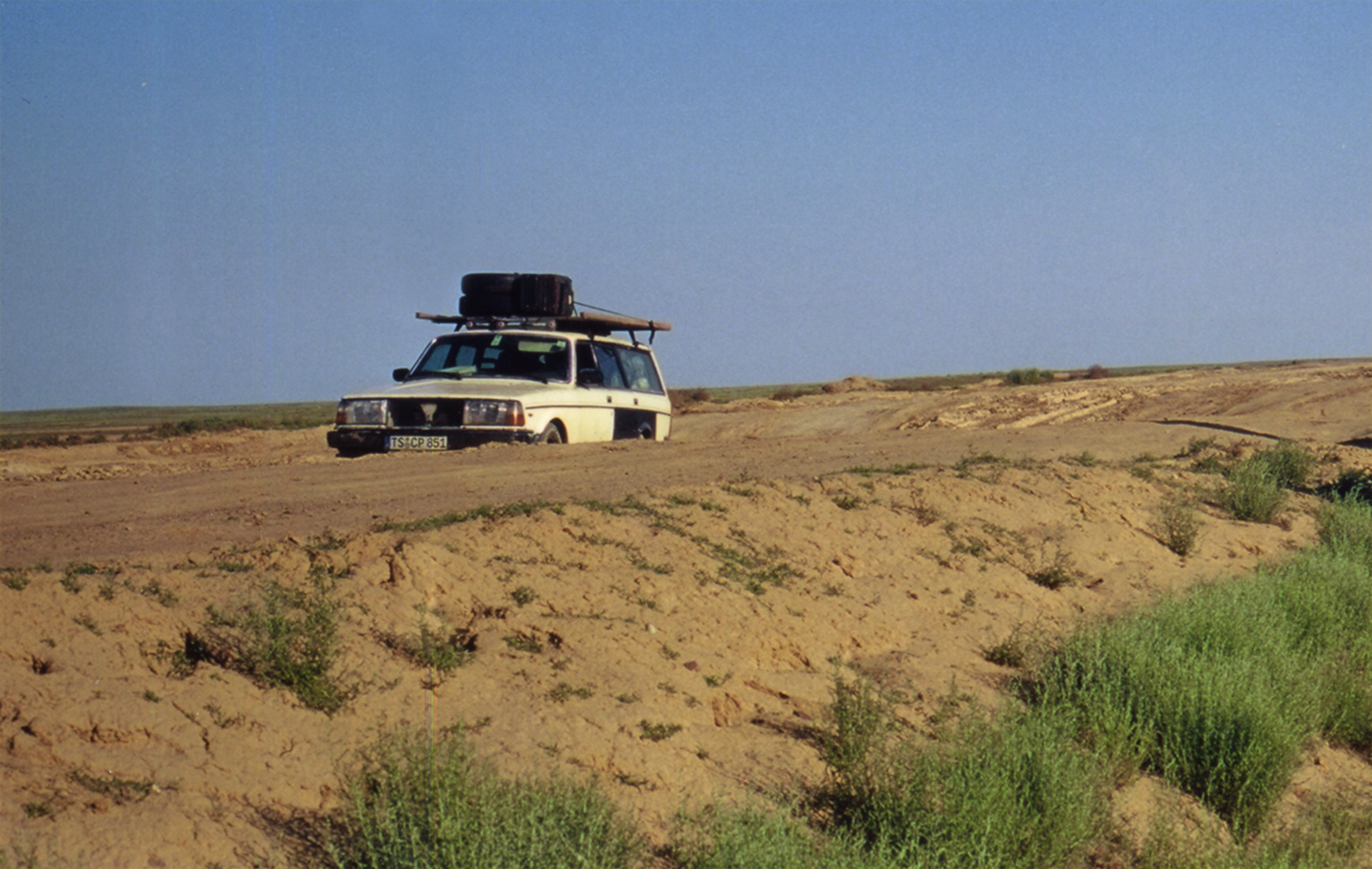
Road between Beyneu (Kazakhstan) and Kungrad (Uzbekistan)

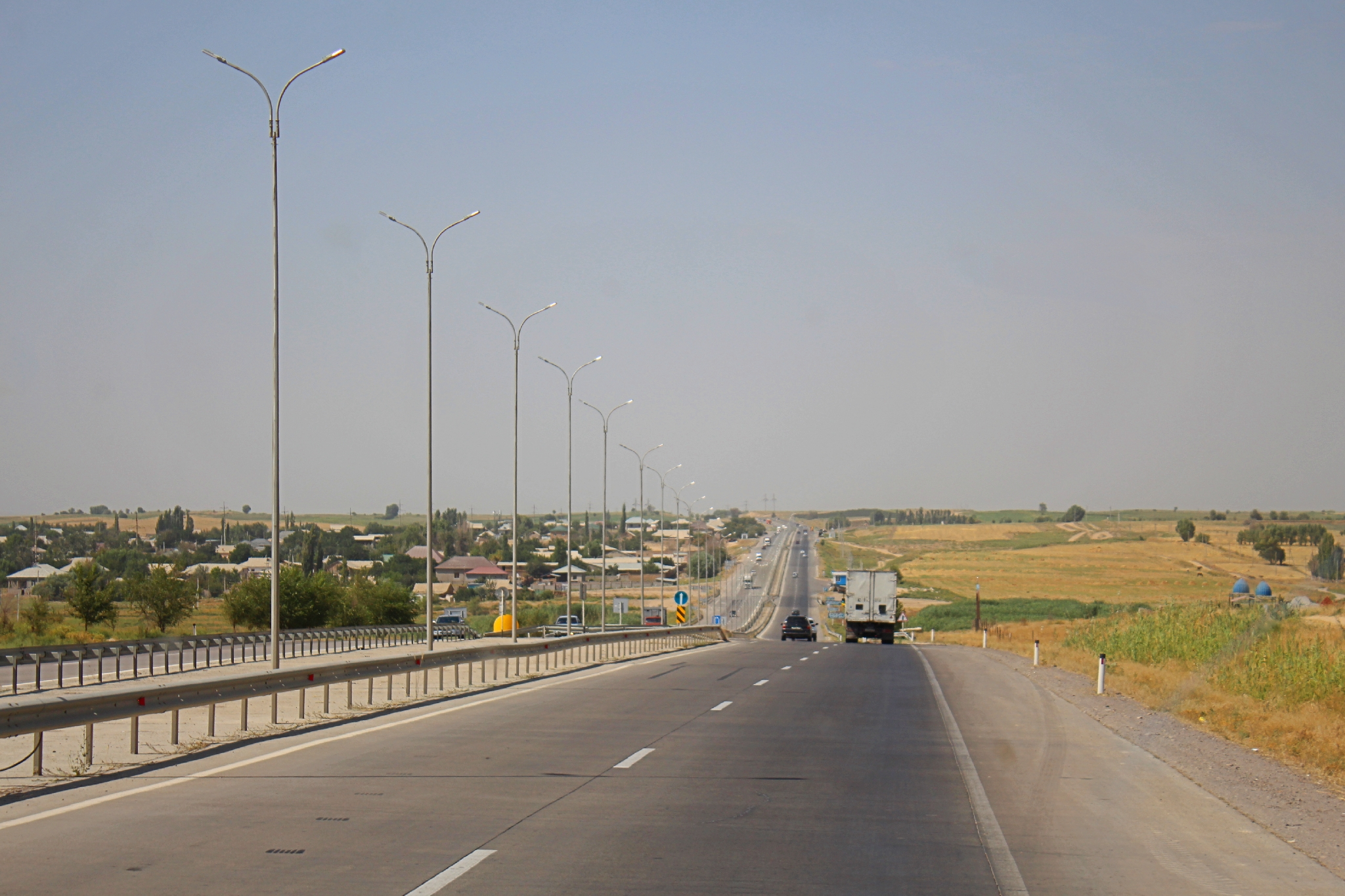
E40 in Kazakhstan. Between Tashkent and Shymkent in the direction to Almaty

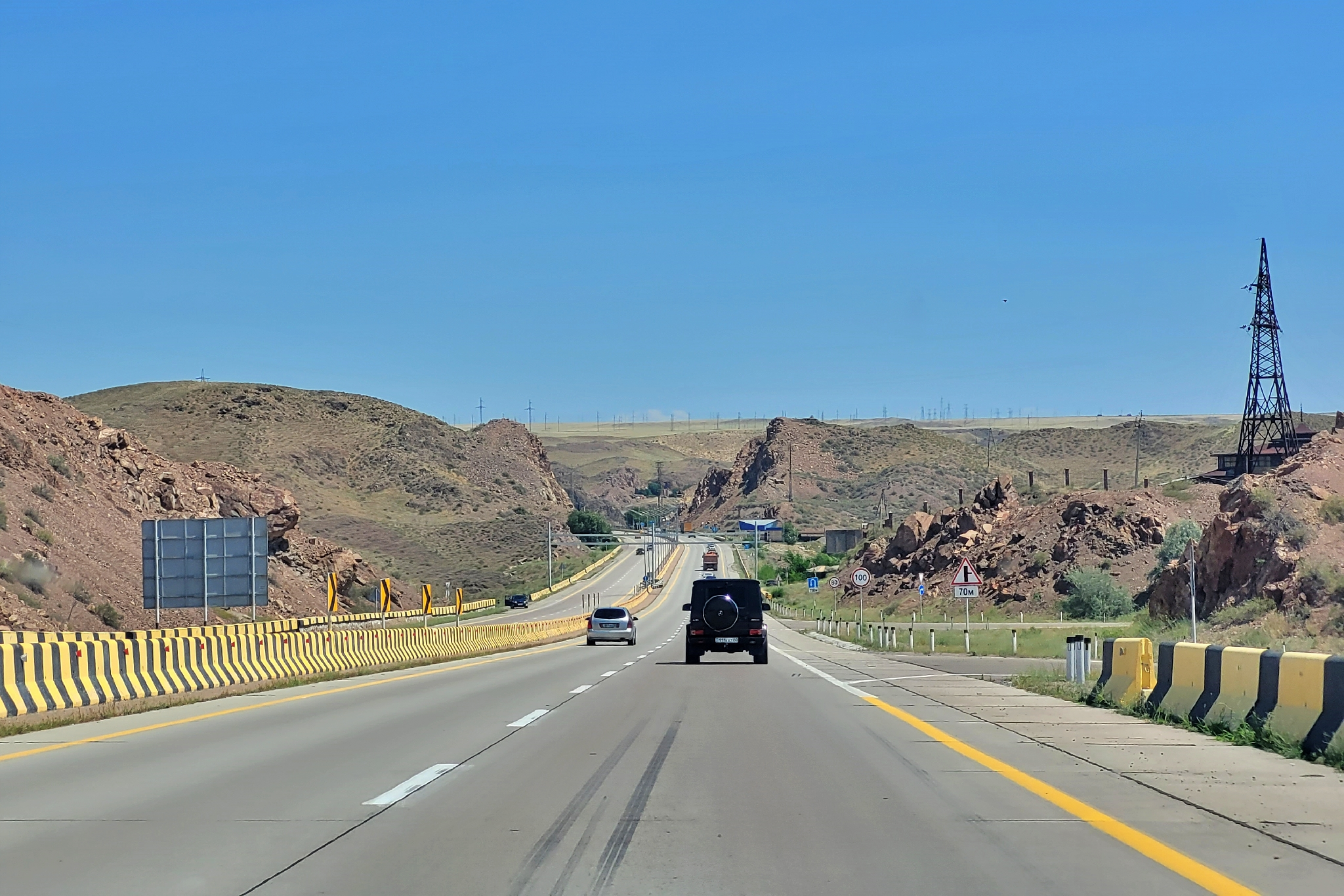
Between Almaty and Taldyqorghan near city Konaev (Kazakhstan)
