= Bundesstraße 429 =

Federal highway in Germany

B 429
- Bundesstraße 429

Route information
- Length: 4.9 km (3.0 mi)

Major junctions
- From: A480, Wettenberg
- To: B49, Giessen

Location
- Country: Germany
- States: Hesse

Highway system
- Roads in Germany; Autobahns; List; Federal; List; State; E-roads

The Bundesstraße 429 is a German federal highway. Forming part of the Gießener Ring, E40 and E44, it runs from A480 in Wettenberg to B49 in Giessen.
