= Bundesautobahn 480 =

Federal motorway in Germany

A 480
- Bundesautobahn 480

Route information
- Length: 17 km (11 mi)

Location
- Country: Germany
- States: Hesse

Highway system
- Roads in Germany; Autobahns; List; Federal; List; State; E-roads

Bundesautobahn 480 (translates from German as Federal Motorway 480, short form Autobahn 480, abbreviated as BAB 480 or A 480) is an Autobahn in Germany connecting Gießen and Wetzlar. It is part of the abandoned A 48 planning.

== Exit list ==
	(1)	Aßlar B 277
		Dillbrücke 260 m
	(2)	Wetzlarer Kreuz A 45 E41
	(-)	Blasbach (provisorisch)
		Heuchelheim / Biebertal (planned)
	(3)	Wettenberg B 429 E40 E44
		Rest area Silbersee/Gleiberger Land
		Lahnbrücke 370 m
	(4)	Gießener Nordkreuz A 485
		Staßenbrücke 140 m
		Krebsbachtalbrücke 680 m
Intersection	(5)	Reiskirchener Dreieck A 5 E40 E451
