= Bundesautobahn 485 =

Federal motorway in Germany

A 485
- Bundesautobahn 485

Route information
- Length: 20 km (12 mi)

Major junctions
- North end: Gießen
- South end: Langgöns

Location
- Country: Germany
- States: Hesse

Highway system
- Roads in Germany; Autobahns; List; Federal; List; State; E-roads

Bundesautobahn 485 (translates from German as Federal Motorway 485, short form Autobahn 485, abbreviated as BAB 485 or A 485) is an autobahn in Germany.

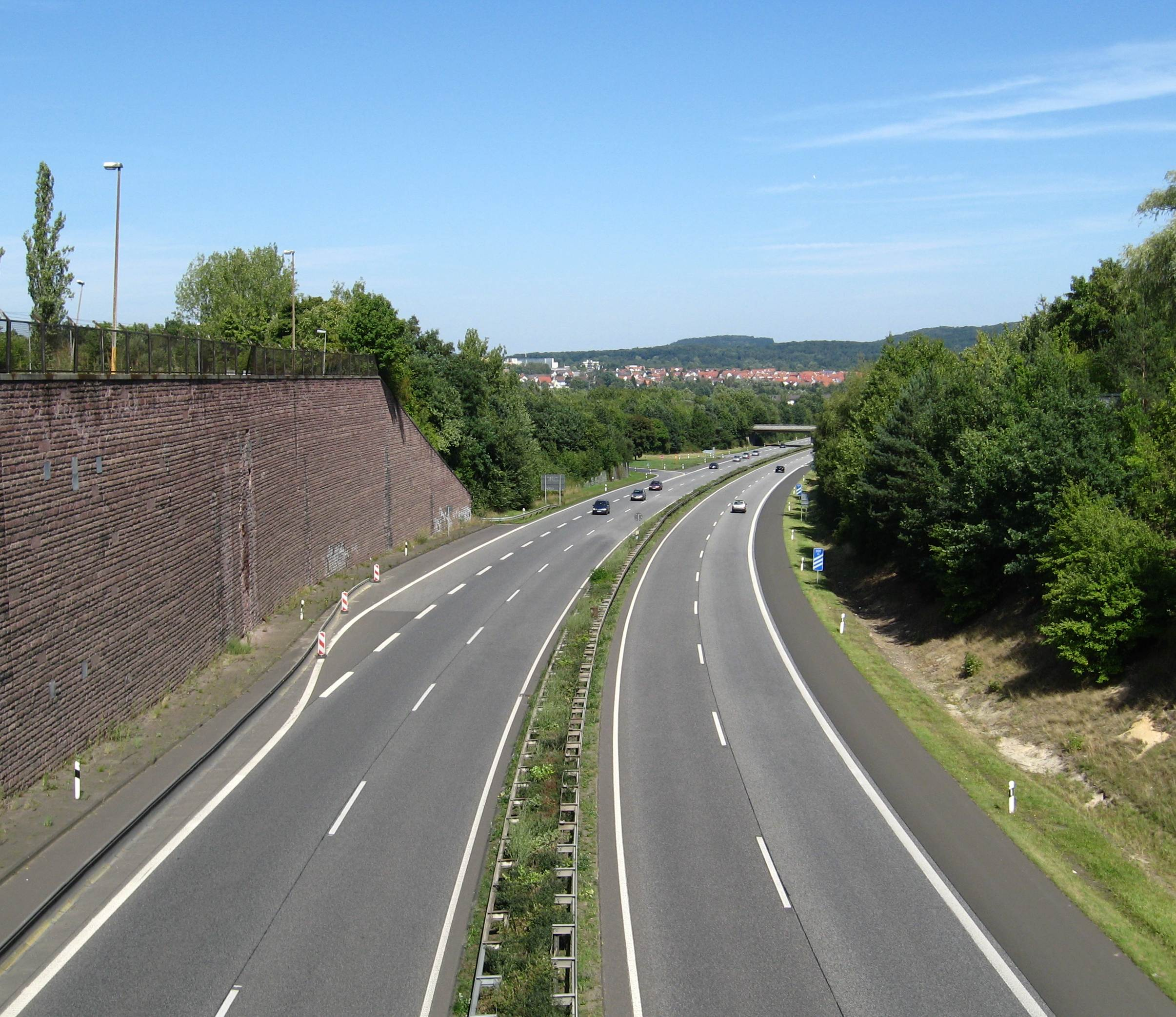
The A 485 northbound at the Rödgener Straße bridge, just after junction 4.

The A 485 is an eastern bypass of the town of Gießen. Between junctions 1 and 7, it is the eastern leg of the Gießener Ring.

The A 485 is one of two completed portions of an abandoned plan to extend the A 49 to Darmstadt. The other portion is the A 661 from junction 8 onwards.

Junction 1 is split into three parts. Heading northbound, the first part that is encountered is a trumpet interchange with the B 3a freeway. The B 3a continues northbound, while A 485 traffic is required to exit the freeway to the right. After exiting, the A 485 continues on a shorter stretch of freeway, passing the Marburger Straße junction before ending at a trumpet with the A 480. All three parts are signed as junction 1, and both trumpets are named Gießener Nordkreuz.

== Exit list ==
| (1) | Gießener Nordkreuz (western half) A 480 E40 |
| (1) | Gießen-Marburger Straße |
| (1) | Gießener Nordkreuz (eastern half) B 3a |
| (2) | Gießen-Wieseck |
| (3) | Gießen-Ursulum B 49 |
| (4) | Gießen-Grünberger Straße B 49 exit from northbound only, no entrance |
| (5) | Gießen-Licher Straße B 457 |
| (6) | Gießen-Schiffenberger Tal |
| | Oberhof (planned) |
| (7) | Bergwerkswald B 49 |
| (8) | Linden |
| (9) | Gießener Südkreuz A 45 E41 |
| (10) | Langgöns |
| B 3 | Freeway continues as the B 3 towards Frankfurt am Main |
