= European route E35 in Germany =

Segment of European route in Germany

European route E 35

Route information
- Maintained by administrative division jurisdictions

Major junctions
- North end: E35 / A 12 at Netherlands border
- E34 / A 2 / A 516 in Oberhausen; E34 / A 40 in Duisburg; E37 / A 1 in Leverkusen; E40 / A 4 / B 55a in Cologne; E40 / A 4 / A 59 in Cologne; E42 / A 3 / A 67 near Frankfurt; E451 / A 5 / A 67 in Darmstadt; E50 / A 6 near Walldorf
- South end: E35 / A 2 at Switzerland border

Location
- Country: Germany
- States: North Rhine-Westphalia, Rhineland-Palatinate, Hesse, Baden-Württemberg

Highway system
- International E-road network; A Class; B Class
← E34	→ E36

European route E 35 (E 35) is a north–south European route, running from Amsterdam in the Netherlands to Rome in Italy. In Germany, the highway runs from the Dutch border near Elten, through Oberhausen, Düsseldorf and Cologne to the Swiss border between Weil am Rhein and Basel.

== Exit list ==
State	District	Location	km	mi	Exit	Name	Destinations	Notes
North Rhine-Westphalia	Kleve	Emmerich am Rhein	0.0– 0.7	0.0– 0.43	1		E35 / A 12 west – Elten, Babberich; A 3 ends	Continuation into the Netherlands; eastern end of A12 concurrency; western end of A 3 concurrency; Elten border crossing
North Rhine-Westphalia	Kleve	Emmerich am Rhein	0.0– 0.7	0.0– 0.43	Raststätte Elten; Southbound entrance and exit only.			
North Rhine-Westphalia	Kleve	Emmerich am Rhein	2.4	1.5	2	Elten	Elten (U4), Beek, NL	L472 not signed
North Rhine-Westphalia	Kleve	Emmerich am Rhein	7.3	4.5	3	Emmerich	B 220 – Emmerich, Kleve, 's-Heerenberg	
North Rhine-Westphalia	Kleve	Emmerich am Rhein			3a	Emmerich East	Emmerich (U6a), Gendringen, Netterden	Netterdensche Straße not signed
North Rhine-Westphalia	Borken	Isselburg			4	Rees	B 67 – Rees, Kalkar, Bolcholt, Isselburg	
North Rhine-Westphalia	Wesel	Hamminkeln			5	Hamminkeln	B 473 – Hamminkeln, Bocholt	
North Rhine-Westphalia	Wesel	Hünxe			6	Wesel	B 58 – Wesel, Schermbeck	
North Rhine-Westphalia	Wesel	Hünxe			7	Hünxe	Hünxe, Voerde	
North Rhine-Westphalia	Wesel	Hünxe			Raststätte Hünxe			
North Rhine-Westphalia	Wesel	Dinslaken			8	Dinslaken north	L462	
North Rhine-Westphalia	Wesel	Dinslaken			9	Dinslaken south	B 8 / L21	
North Rhine-Westphalia	Oberhausen				10	Oberhausen	E34 / A 2 / A 516	
North Rhine-Westphalia	Oberhausen				11	Oberhausen-Holten	L287 / L215	
North Rhine-Westphalia	Duisburg				12	Oberhausen West	A 42	
North Rhine-Westphalia	Oberhausen				13		L447	
North Rhine-Westphalia	Duisburg				14		E34 / A 40	
North Rhine-Westphalia	Duisburg				15		L60 / L138	
North Rhine-Westphalia	Mettmann	Ratingen			16		A 52	
North Rhine-Westphalia	Mettmann	Ratingen			17		A 44	
North Rhine-Westphalia	Düsseldorf				18		B 7	
North Rhine-Westphalia	Mettmann	Hilden			19		A 46	
North Rhine-Westphalia	Mettmann	Langenfeld			20		B 229 / L402	
North Rhine-Westphalia	Mettmann	Langenfeld			21		A 542	
North Rhine-Westphalia	Leverkusen				22		B 8 / L288	
North Rhine-Westphalia	Leverkusen				23		E37 / A 1	
North Rhine-Westphalia	Leverkusen				24		Willy-Brandt-Ring	
North Rhine-Westphalia	Cologne				25		Mülheimer Zubringer	
North Rhine-Westphalia	Cologne				26		B 506	
North Rhine-Westphalia	Cologne				27		E40 / A 4 / B 55a	
North Rhine-Westphalia	Cologne				28		E40 / A 4 / A 59	
North Rhine-Westphalia	Cologne				29		L489	
North Rhine-Westphalia	Rheinisch-Bergischer Kreis	Rösrath			30a		L288	Southbound exit and northbound entrance
North Rhine-Westphalia	Rhein-Sieg-Kreis	Lohmar			30b		B 484 / B 507 / L288	Northbound exit and southbound entrance
North Rhine-Westphalia	Rhein-Sieg-Kreis	Lohmar			31		L16	
North Rhine-Westphalia	Rhein-Sieg-Kreis	Sankt Augustin			32		A 560	
North Rhine-Westphalia	Rhein-Sieg-Kreis	Königswinter			33		L331	
North Rhine-Westphalia	Rhein-Sieg-Kreis	Bad Honnef			34		L247	
Rhineland-Palatinate	Neuwied	Asbach			35			
Rhineland-Palatinate	Neuwied	Rengsdorf			36			
Rhineland-Palatinate	Neuwied	Dierdorf			37			
Rhineland-Palatinate	Westerwaldkreis	Wirges			38			
Rhineland-Palatinate	Westerwaldkreis	Wirges			39			
Rhineland-Palatinate	Westerwaldkreis	Montabaur			40			
Rhineland-Palatinate	Westerwaldkreis	Montabaur			41			
Hesse	Limburg-Weilburg	Limburg an der Lahn			42			
Hesse	Limburg-Weilburg	Limburg an der Lahn			43			
Hesse	Limburg-Weilburg	Bad Camberg			44			
Hesse	Rheingau-Taunus-Kreis	Idstein			45			
Hesse	Rheingau-Taunus-Kreis	Idstein			—			
Hesse	Wiesbaden				46			
Hesse	Main-Taunus-Kreis	Hochheim am Main			47			
Hesse	Groß-Gerau	Raunheim			48			
Hesse	Groß-Gerau	Raunheim			48 / 1			
Hesse	Groß-Gerau	Rüsselsheim			2			
Hesse	Groß-Gerau	Rüsselsheim			3			
Hesse	Groß-Gerau	Groß-Gerau			4			
Hesse	Groß-Gerau	Büttelborn			5			
Hesse	Darmstadt-Dieburg	Griesheim			6			
Hesse	Darmstadt				6 / 26			
Hesse	Darmstadt				27			
Hesse	Darmstadt-Dieburg	Pfungstadt			28			
Hesse	Bergstraße	Zwingenberg, Hesse			29			
Hesse	Bergstraße	Bensheim			30			
Hesse	Bergstraße	Heppenheim			31			
Baden-Württemberg	Rhein-Neckar-Kreis	Hemsbach			32			
Baden-Württemberg	Rhein-Neckar-Kreis	Weinheim			33			
Baden-Württemberg	Rhein-Neckar-Kreis	Hirschberg an der Bergstraße			34			
Baden-Württemberg	Rhein-Neckar-Kreis	Ladenburg-Schriesheim city line			35			
Baden-Württemberg	Rhein-Neckar-Kreis	Dossenheim			36			
Baden-Württemberg	Heidelberg				37			
Baden-Württemberg	Heidelberg				38			
Baden-Württemberg	Rhein-Neckar-Kreis	Walldorf			39			
Baden-Württemberg	Rhein-Neckar-Kreis	Walldorf-Sankt Leon-Rot city line			40			
Baden-Württemberg	Karlsruhe	Kronau			41			
Baden-Württemberg	Karlsruhe	Karlsdorf-Neuthard			42			
Baden-Württemberg	Karlsruhe				43			
Baden-Württemberg	Karlsruhe				44			
Baden-Württemberg	Karlsruhe				45			
Baden-Württemberg	Karlsruhe				46			
Baden-Württemberg	Karlsruhe				47			
Baden-Württemberg	Karlsruhe	Ettlingen			48			
Baden-Württemberg	Rastatt	Rastatt			49			
Baden-Württemberg	Baden-Baden				50			
Baden-Württemberg	Baden-Baden				—			
Baden-Württemberg	Baden-Baden				51			
Baden-Württemberg	Rastatt	Bühl			52			
Baden-Württemberg	Ortenaukreis	Achern			53			
Baden-Württemberg	Ortenaukreis	Willstätt-Offenburg city line			54			
Baden-Württemberg	Ortenaukreis	Offenburg			55			
Baden-Württemberg	Ortenaukreis	Lahr			56			
Baden-Württemberg	Ortenaukreis	Mahlberg			57a			
Baden-Württemberg	Ortenaukreis	Ringsheim			57b			
Baden-Württemberg	Emmerdingen	Herbolzheim			58			
Baden-Württemberg	Emmerdingen	Riegel am Kaiserstuhl			59			
Baden-Württemberg	Emmerdingen	Teningen			60			
Baden-Württemberg	Freiburg im Breisgau				61			
Baden-Württemberg	Freiburg im Breisgau				62			
Baden-Württemberg	Freiburg im Breisgau				63			
Baden-Württemberg	Breisgau-Hochschwarzwald	Bad Krozingen			64a			
Baden-Württemberg	Breisgau-Hochschwarzwald	Hartheim am Rhein			64b			
Baden-Württemberg	Breisgau-Hochschwarzwald	Neuenburg am Rhein			65			
Baden-Württemberg	Breisgau-Hochschwarzwald	Neuenburg am Rhein			66			
Baden-Württemberg	Lörrach	Efringen-Kirchen			67			
Baden-Württemberg	Lörrach	Weil am Rhein			68			
Baden-Württemberg	Lörrach	Weil am Rhein			69			
Baden-Württemberg	Lörrach	Weil am Rhein					E35 / A 2 south – Weil am Rhein, Basel	Continuation into Switzerland; southern end of A 5 concurrency; northern end of A2 concurrency
1.000 mi = 1.609 km; 1.000 km = 0.621 mi: Concurrency terminus; Incomplete access

== See also ==
European route E35
Previous country: Netherlands	Germany	Next country: Switzerland
