= Jasliq =

Jasliq Jaslıq
- urban-type settlement
- Location in Uzbekistan
- Coordinates: 43°58′24″N 57°29′38″E
- Country: Uzbekistan
- Autonomous Republic: Karakalpakstan
- District: Qoʻngʻirot District

Population (2016)
  - Total: 4,600
- Time zone: UTC+5 (UZT)

Jasliq (Karakalpak: Jaslıq/Жаслық, Uzbek: Jasliq/Жаслиқ, Russian: Жаслык) is an urban-type settlement of Qońırat District in Karakalpakstan in Uzbekistan. It is connected by road to Qaraqalpaqstan in the northwest, and Kunkhodzha in the southeast. Its population was 3,791 people in 1989, and 4,600 in 2016.

Jasliq contains the notorious Jaslyk Prison, where in 2010, the Independent Human Rights Defenders of Uzbekistan reported the deaths of 39 prisoners. Torture and deaths from violence are not uncommon at the prison.

== Climate ==
Jasliq has a cold desert climate (BWk) according to the Köppen climate classification.

Climate data for Jasliq (1991–2020 normals, extremes 1966–present)
Month	Jan	Feb	Mar	Apr	May	Jun	Jul	Aug	Sep	Oct	Nov	Dec	Year
Record high °C (°F)	12.4 (54.3)	23.0 (73.4)	31.0 (87.8)	36.9 (98.4)	43.4 (110.1)	44.2 (111.6)	46.2 (115.2)	46.7 (116.1)	42.3 (108.1)	32.0 (89.6)	25.5 (77.9)	18.3 (64.9)	46.7 (116.1)
Mean daily maximum °C (°F)	−2.8 (27.0)	−0.1 (31.8)	8.8 (47.8)	18.9 (66.0)	27.0 (80.6)	32.9 (91.2)	35.3 (95.5)	33.5 (92.3)	26.2 (79.2)	17.4 (63.3)	6.5 (43.7)	−0.7 (30.7)	16.9 (62.4)
Daily mean °C (°F)	−6.4 (20.5)	−4.6 (23.7)	3.3 (37.9)	12.6 (54.7)	20.6 (69.1)	26.2 (79.2)	28.5 (83.3)	26.2 (79.2)	18.7 (65.7)	10.2 (50.4)	1.4 (34.5)	−4.5 (23.9)	11.0 (51.8)
Mean daily minimum °C (°F)	−9.9 (14.2)	−8.6 (16.5)	−1.4 (29.5)	6.5 (43.7)	13.9 (57.0)	18.7 (65.7)	21.1 (70.0)	18.3 (64.9)	11.2 (52.2)	3.8 (38.8)	−2.9 (26.8)	−8.0 (17.6)	5.2 (41.4)
Record low °C (°F)	−34.0 (−29.2)	−31.4 (−24.5)	−24.8 (−12.6)	−6.7 (19.9)	0.0 (32.0)	3.7 (38.7)	10.7 (51.3)	6.0 (42.8)	−2.6 (27.3)	−15.2 (4.6)	−28.2 (−18.8)	−28.7 (−19.7)	−34.0 (−29.2)
Average precipitation mm (inches)	12 (0.5)	9 (0.4)	15 (0.6)	16 (0.6)	13 (0.5)	11 (0.4)	6 (0.2)	4 (0.2)	3 (0.1)	8 (0.3)	12 (0.5)	10 (0.4)	119 (4.7)
Average precipitation days (≥ 1.0 mm)	10	7	7	6	7	4	4	2	3	4	7	10	71
Source 1: Погода и Климат
Source 2: NOAA
