= Zhaslyk (airfield) =

- IATA: none; ICAO: none

Summary
- Location: 9 km northeast of Zhaslyk, Karakalpakstan, Uzbekistan
- Time zone: +5 ()
- Elevation AMSL: 423 ft / 129 m
- Coordinates: 44°03′16″N 57°32′52″E
- Interactive map of Zhaslyk

Runways
Direction	Length		Surface
Direction	ft	m	Surface
08/26		3,550x50	concrete

Zhaslyk was an airfield of the Soviet Armed Forces located 9 km north-east of Zhaslyk in the Republic of Karakalpakstan, in the Uzbek Soviet Socialist Republic of the Soviet Union. In English-language sources it is designated Beleuli North.

It was built in the mid-1980s to serve the “Eighth Chemical Defense Station” located near Zhaslyk, intended for testing chemical weapons and means of protection against them. The test site was operated by military personnel from units stationed in Nukus: a chemical testing regiment (Military Unit Number (V/ch) 44105) and a center for the development of means of protection against chemical weapons (military unit 26382). For aviation support of the test site, the 287th separate test aviation squadron (Antonov An-26 aircraft, Mi-8 helicopters), based at the Nukus Airport, was used.
