= Qubla-Ustyurt =

- urban-type settlement
- Location in Uzbekistan
- Coordinates: 44°01′39″N 58°14′50″E
- Country: Uzbekistan
- Autonomous Republic: Karakalpakstan
- District: Qo‘ng‘irot District

Population (1989)
  - Total: 520
- Time zone: UTC+5 (UZT)

Qubla-Ustyurt (Uzbek: Qubla-Ustyurt, Russian: Кубла-Устюрт) is an urban-type settlement of Qo‘ng‘irot District in Karakalpakstan in Uzbekistan.

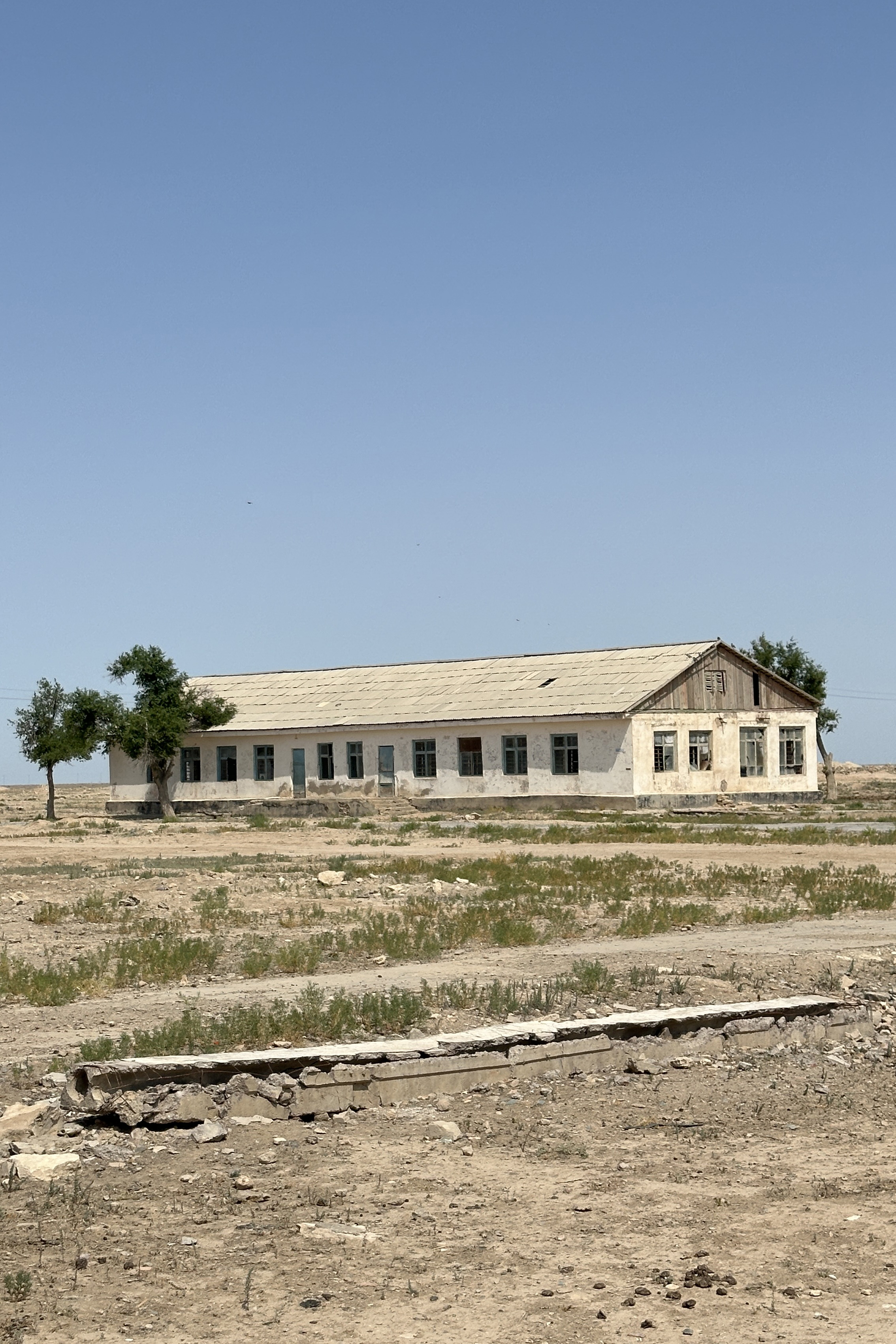
A building on the outskirts of the village

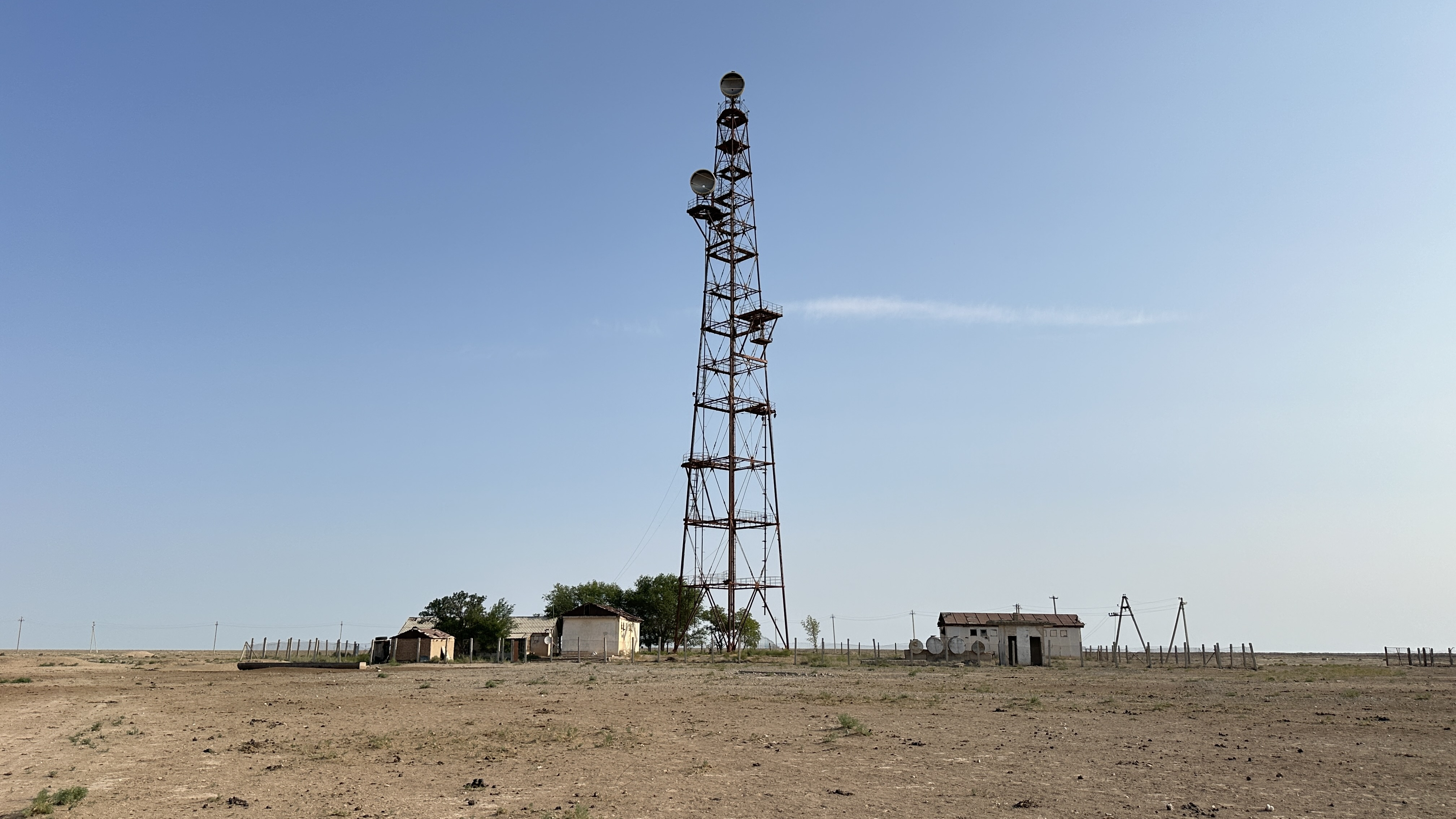
Telecommunication tower

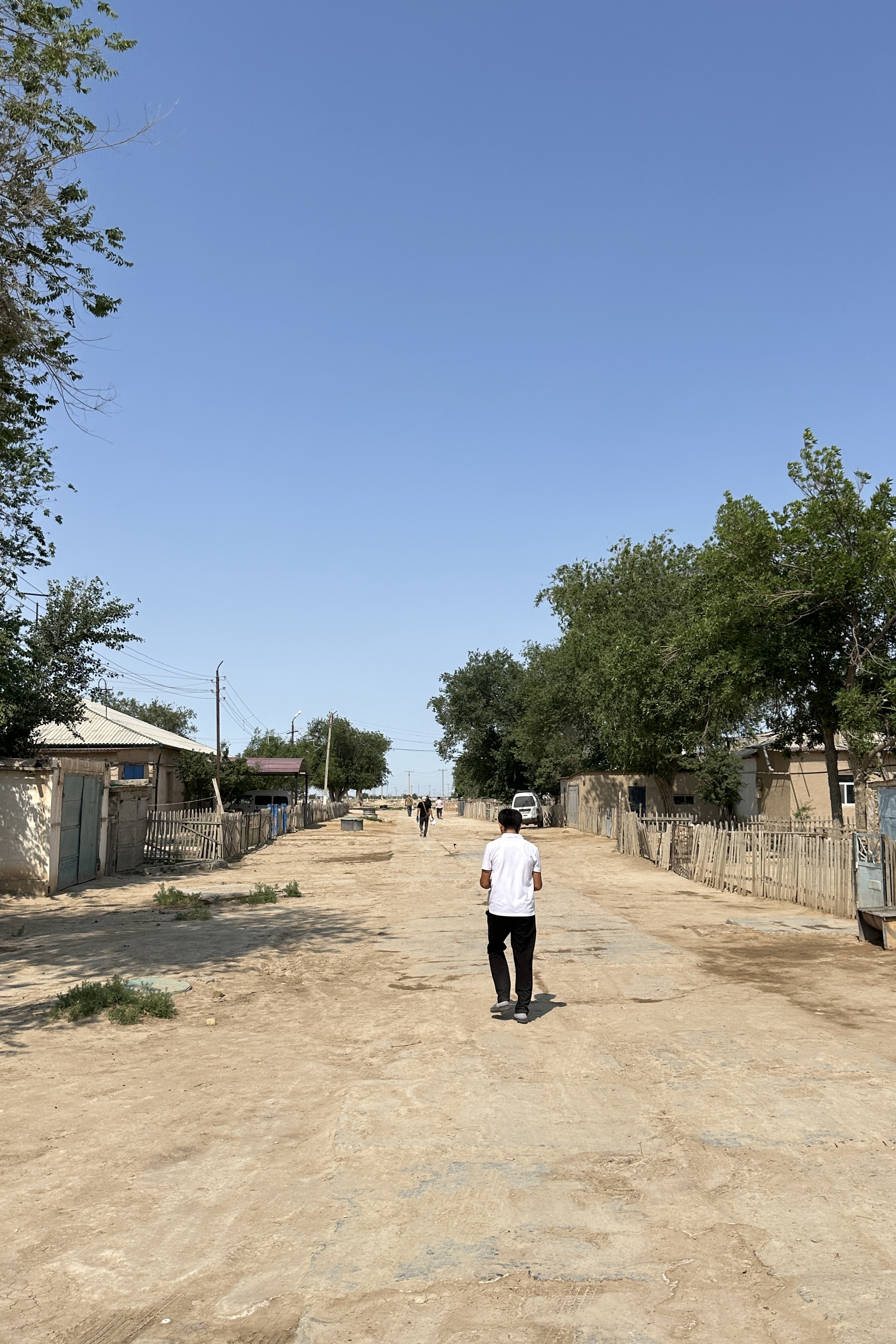
Qubla-Ustyurt village street
