= Qirqqiz =

- urban-type settlement
- Location in Uzbekistan
- Coordinates: 43°09′33″N 58°12′25″E
- Country: Uzbekistan
- Autonomous Republic: Karakalpakstan
- District: Qoʻngʻirot District

Population (2016)
  - Total: 1,200
- Time zone: UTC+5 (UZT)

Qirqqiz (Uzbek: Qirqqiz / Қирққиз, until 2010 Oqshoʻlaq / Оқшўлақ; Russian: Кириккиз) is an urban-type settlement of Qoʻngʻirot District in Karakalpakstan in Uzbekistan. Its population was 1,000 people in 2000, and 1,200 in 2016.
