= European route E404 =

Road in trans-European E-road network

E404

Route information
- Length: 0 km (0 mi; 0 ft)

Major junctions
- From: Jabbeke
- To: Zeebrugge

Location
- Countries: Belgium

Highway system
- International E-road network; A Class; B Class

E404 was supposed to be a European B class road in Belgium, connecting the cities Jabbeke and Zeebrugge. However, the road was not built according to the original plans. The number is nevertheless still given to a route between the two cities as a likely Easter egg referencing a HTTP response code 404 "Not Found", but it is not signposted on any existing roads between those cities nor found on maps.

== Route ==
- Belgium
  - E40 Jabbeke
  - E34, E403 Zeebrugge
