= Elobod =

- urban-type settlement
- Location in Uzbekistan
- Coordinates: 43°06′20″N 58°22′40″E
- Country: Uzbekistan
- Autonomous Republic: Karakalpakstan
- District: Qoʻngʻirot District

Population (2016)
  - Total: 900
- Time zone: UTC+5 (UZT)

Elobod (Uzbek: Элобод, Elobod, also Yelabad) is an urban-type settlement of Qoʻngʻirot District in Karakalpakstan in Uzbekistan. Its population is 900 (2016).
