= European route E125 =

Road in trans-European E-road network

E125

Route information
- Length: 2,397 km (1,489 mi)

Major junctions
- North end: Ishim, Russia
- South end: Torugart Pass, Kyrgyzstan-China

Location
- Countries: Russia; Kazakhstan; Kyrgyzstan; China

Highway system
- International E-road network; A Class; B Class

European route E125 is a Class A in Russia, Kazakhstan and Kyrgyzstan.

== Itinerary ==
The E125 routes through 3 countries:

Russia

- 71A-1011/71A-1109: Ishim - Kazanskoye - border with Kazakhstan

Kazakhstan

- A 12: Sokolovka – Petropavl – border of Russia
- A 1: Petropavl - Kokshetau - Astana
- M 36: Astana – Karaganda – Almaty
- A 2: Almaty - Kaskelen - Kenen
- A 2 (Branch): Kenen - Korday - Border of Kyrgyzstan

Kyrgyzstan

- ЭМ-01 ЭМ-01 Road: Border of Kazakhstan - Georgievka - Bishkek
- ЭМ-11 ЭМ-11 Road: Bishkek - Torugart Pass - Border of China ( connects G315))
