= Oltinkoʻl, Karakalpakstan =

Oltinkoʻl
- urban-type settlement
- Location in Uzbekistan
- Coordinates: 43°04′33″N 58°54′24″E
- Country: Uzbekistan
- Autonomous Republic: Karakalpakstan
- District: Qoʻngʻirot District

Population (2016)
  - Total: 28,300
- Time zone: UTC+5 (UZT)

Oltinkoʻl (Uzbek: Oltinkoʻl, Олтинкўл, Karakalpak: Altınkól, Алтынкөл) is an urban-type settlement of Qoʻngʻirot District in Karakalpakstan in Uzbekistan. Its population was 20,463 people in 1989, and 28,300 in 2016.
