= Qońırat district =

Coordinates: 43°04′12″N 58°54′00″E

Qońirat district Қоңырат районы, Qońırat rayonı
- District
- Qońirat district
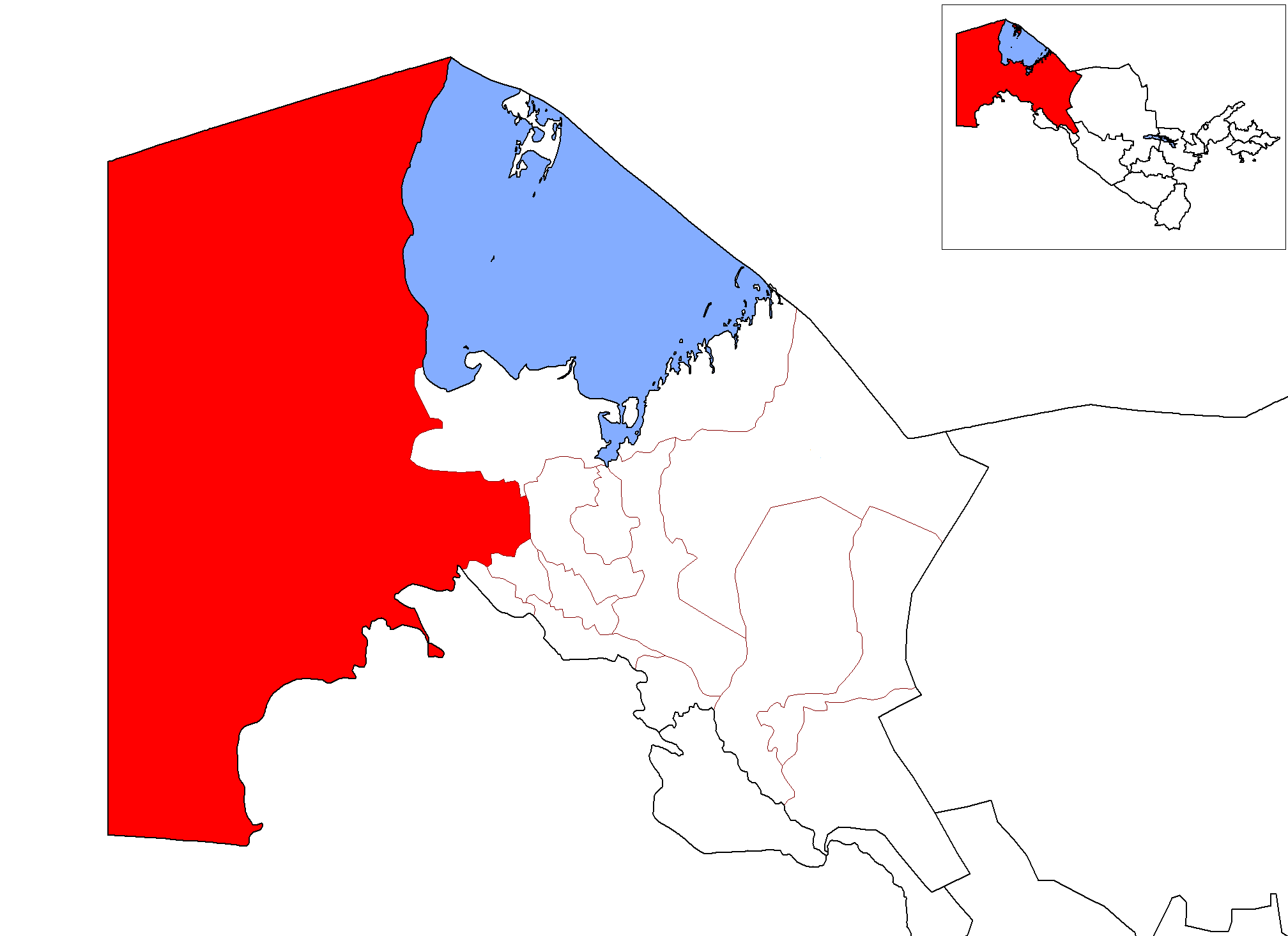
- Country: Uzbekistan
- Autonomous Republic: Karakalpakstan
- Seat: Qońirat

Area
  - Total: 76,000 km^{2} (29,000 sq mi)

Population (2022)
  - Total: 132,800
  - Density: 1.7/km^{2} (4.5/sq mi)
- Time zone: UTC+5 (UZT)

Qońirat district (Karakalpak: Қоңырат районы, romanized: Qońırat rayonı) is a district of the Republic of Karakalpakstan, with Qońirat as its seat. Its area is 76,000 km^{2} (29,000 sq mi) and it had 132,800 people in 2022.

The district contains one city, Qońirat, five towns Jasliq, Altinkól, Qiriq qiz (Aqsholaq), Elabat, and Qaraqalpaqstan, as well as twelve rural communities Ádebiyat, Ájiniyaz, Qońirat, Qańli, Órnek, Rawshan, Súyenli, Ustyurt, Xorezm, Kókdarya, Miynetabat and Qipshaq.
