= Elten =

Village in Germany

Coordinates: 51°52′16″N 6°09′35″E

Elten (German pronunciation: [ˈɛltn̩]) is a German village located in North Rhine-Westphalia. It has a population of around 4,500. Since 1975, it has been part of the town of Emmerich am Rhein. Between 1949 and 1963, Elten was part of the Netherlands (see Bakker-Schut Plan). There is a substantial minority of Dutch citizens.

Hochelten is part of Elten and is situated on the Elterberg.

== Gallery ==
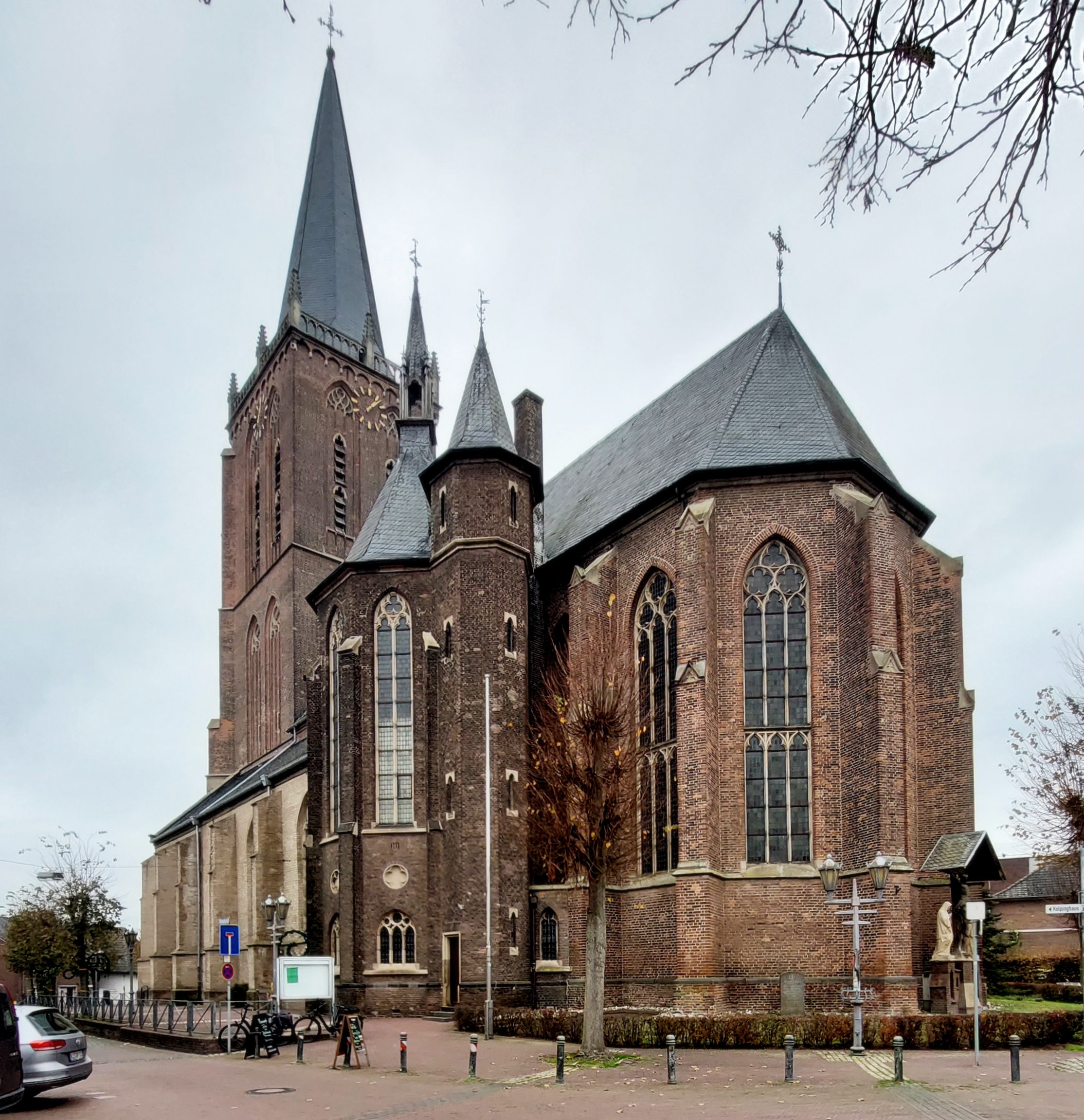
St. Martinus

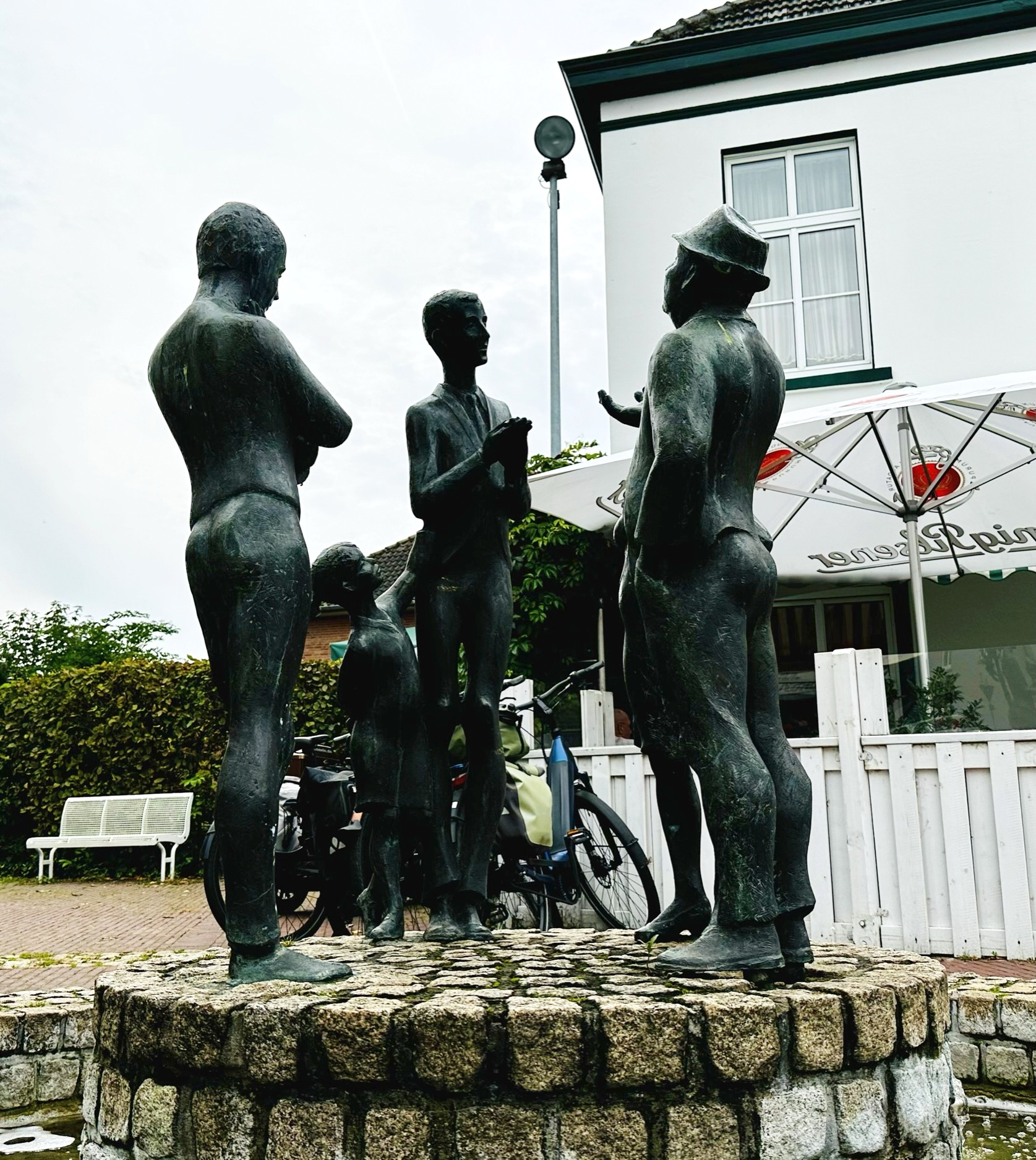
Eltener Marktbrunnen

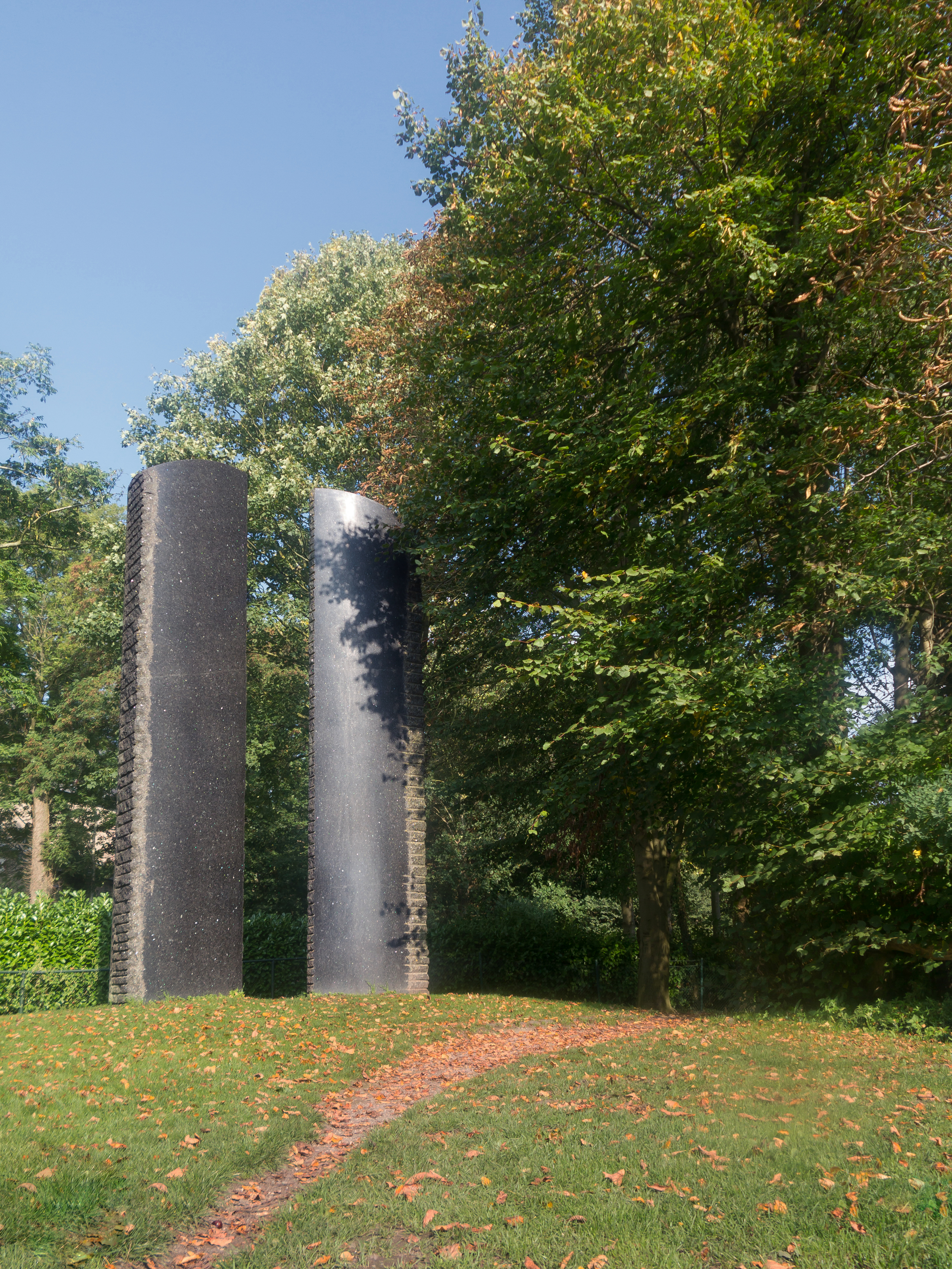
Hoch Elten

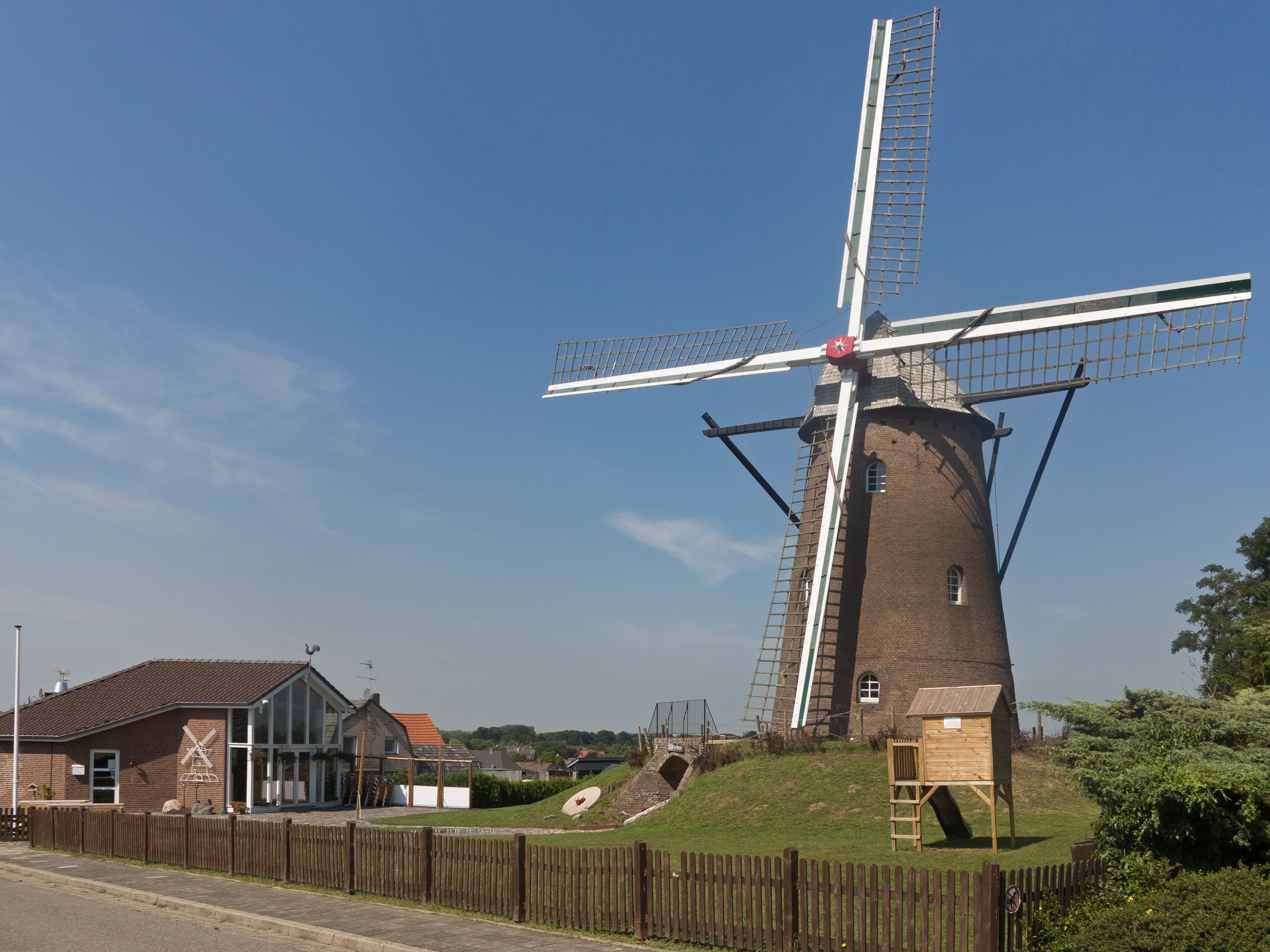
Gerritzens Mühle windmill

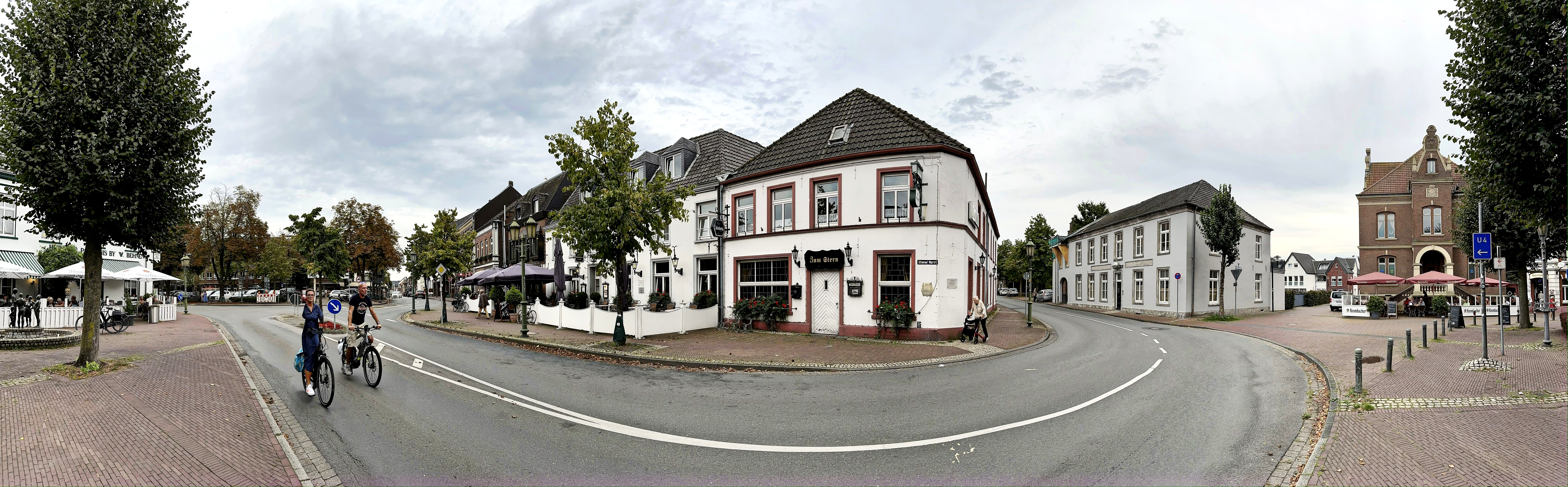
Panoramic of Elten street

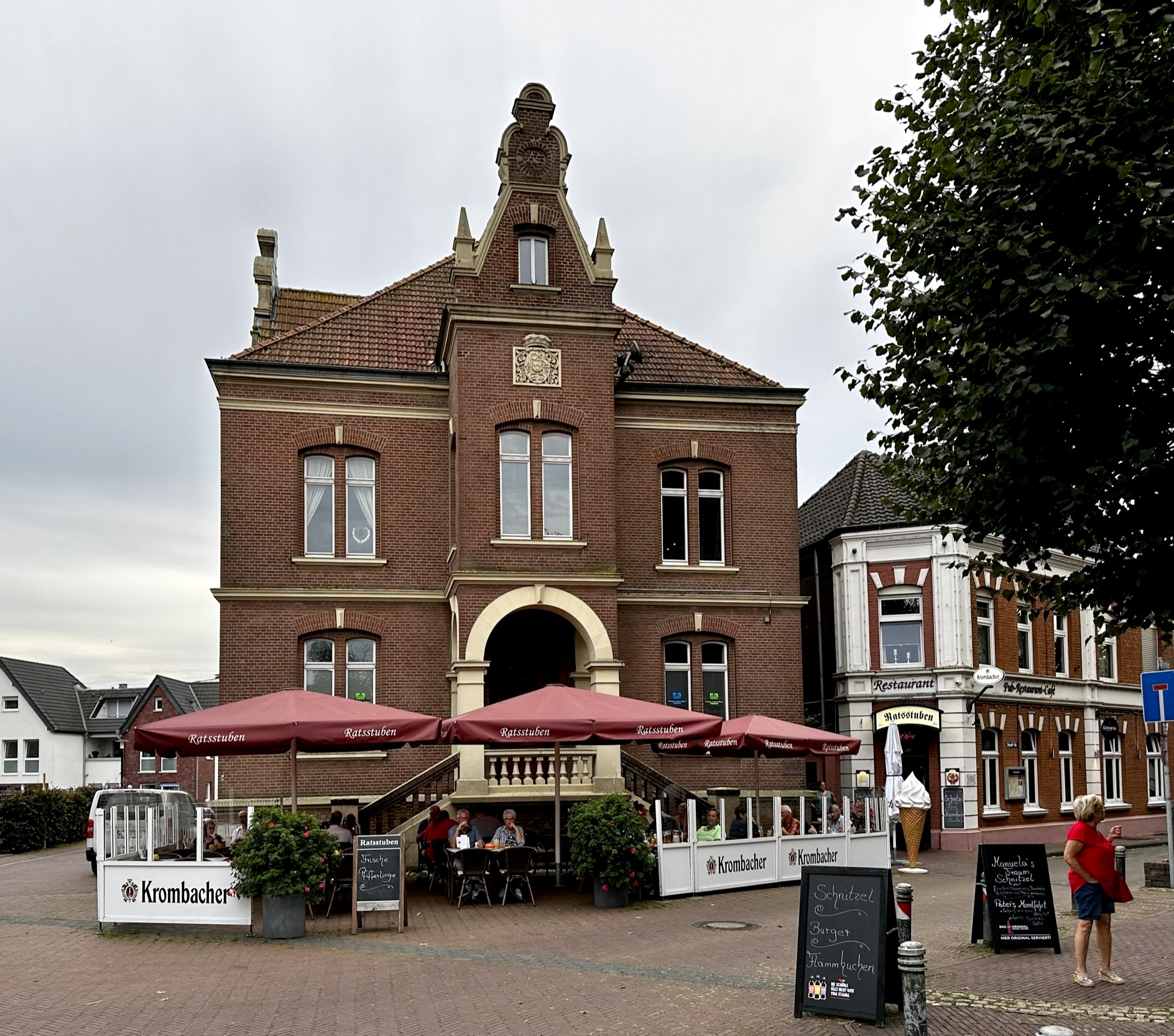
Ehemaliges Rathaus Elten

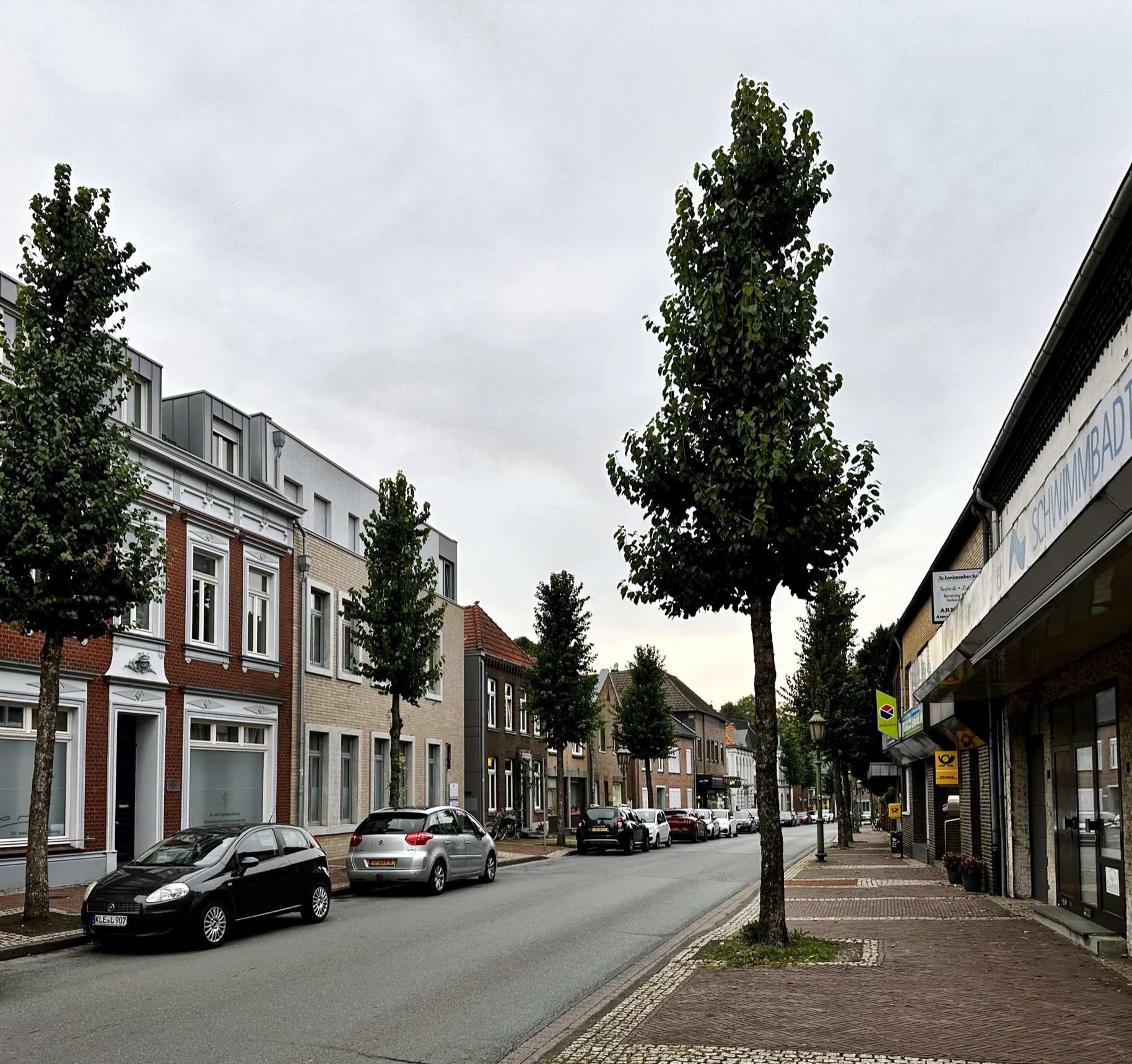
A street in Elten
