= A2 highway (Kazakhstan) =

Road in Kazakhstan

Route map.

A2 is a national highway in Kazakhstan that runs from the border of Uzbekistan to the selo of Horgos with a total length of 1,292 kilometres (803 mi). It is part of the European route E40 and Asian Highway 5.

The route starts at the border of Uzbekistan, near the city of Tashkent and in Kazakhstan it passes cities of Shymkent and Taraz until it reaches the border of Kyrgyzstan and goes through Bishkek. Then, it goes north back to the border and reaches Almaty, goes east and ends at the border of the country.
