= Gießener Ring =

Ring road in Germany

Route information
- Length: 23.6 km (14.7 mi)

Location
- States: Hesse

The Gießener Ring is the name given to the ring of federal roads and motorways that runs around the central Hessian city of Giessen.

== History ==
The Gießener Ring was completed on 19 November 1979 with the construction of the southern bypass and cost 317 million DM. Further costs arose in the following years due to road subsidence and several landslides. Nature conservationists in particular criticized the construction due to the large amount of land used and the impairment of the Bergwerkswald and Hangelstein nature reserves.

For years, there was also discussion about closing the former makeshift exit on Grünberger Straße, which leads the ring northwards directly onto Bundesstraße 49 towards Reiskirchen. However, this was not done because this exit is particularly important for heavy goods traffic and the alternative route via Ursulum is not designed for this. An expansion into a full-fledged junction proposed by the city of Giessen cannot be approved for technical reasons.
