= European route E004 =

Road in trans-European E-road network

E004

Major junctions
- From: Kyzylorda
- To: Bukhara

Location
- Countries: Kazakhstan; Uzbekistan

Highway system
- International E-road network; A Class; B Class

E 004 is a European B class road in Kazakhstan and Uzbekistan, connecting the cities Kyzylorda – Uchkuduk – Bukhara. It is not signposted in both countries.

== Route ==
- Kazakhstan
  - Kyzylorda
- Uzbekistan
  - Uchkuduk
  - Bukhara
