= Kotyaevka =

Coordinates: 46°33′N 48°45′E

Kotyaevka (Kazakh: Котяевка, Kotiaevka) is a small village situated on the right bank of the Kigash River in the Kurmangazy District of Atyrau Region, Kazakhstan. Geographical coordinates are: Latitude (DMS): 46° 32' 40 N, Longitude (DMS): 48° 45' 20 E.

It is located in 30 kilometers from Ganyushkino, administrative centre of Kurmangazy district. Kotyaevka is situated on the Kazakhstan's western border with Russia.

From October 2007 Kurmangazy single check-point has started to operate for all those crossing Kazakhstani-Russian border. The opening ceremony of the check point was held in September 2007 and was attended by Russian Prime Minister Viktor Zubkov and his Kazakh counterpart Karim Massimov.

== Sources ==
- KazIndex, Atyrau Province Book
- Government of Kazakhstan website
