= Jaslyk Prison =

1999–2019 detention facility in northwestern Uzbekistan

- Uzbekistan

Location
- Jaslyk in Uzbekistan
- Location within Uzbekistan
- Coordinates: 44.018142°N 57.527329°E

Site history
- Built: 1999
- Demolished: 2019

Jaslyk Prison (Uzbek: Jasliq, Жаслиқ, [d͡ʒasˈlək]) was a detention facility in Jasliq, Karakalpakstan in north-west Uzbekistan where human rights activists and ex-inmates alleged that torture was widespread. Former prisoners include Muzafar Avazov, who was apparently boiled to death.

The prison, officially known by the codename UYA 64/71, was located in a former Soviet military base once used for testing chemical warfare protection equipment. It was established in 1999. The prison was opened to contain thousands of people arrested following bombings in the capital, Tashkent, and as of 2012 held 5,000–7,000 people according to Human Rights Watch.

The prison was shut down by Uzbekistan's president, Shavkat Mirziyoyev, in September 2019.
