= Qońirat =

Qońırat Karakalpak: Қоңырат, Qońırat
- City
- Қоңырат
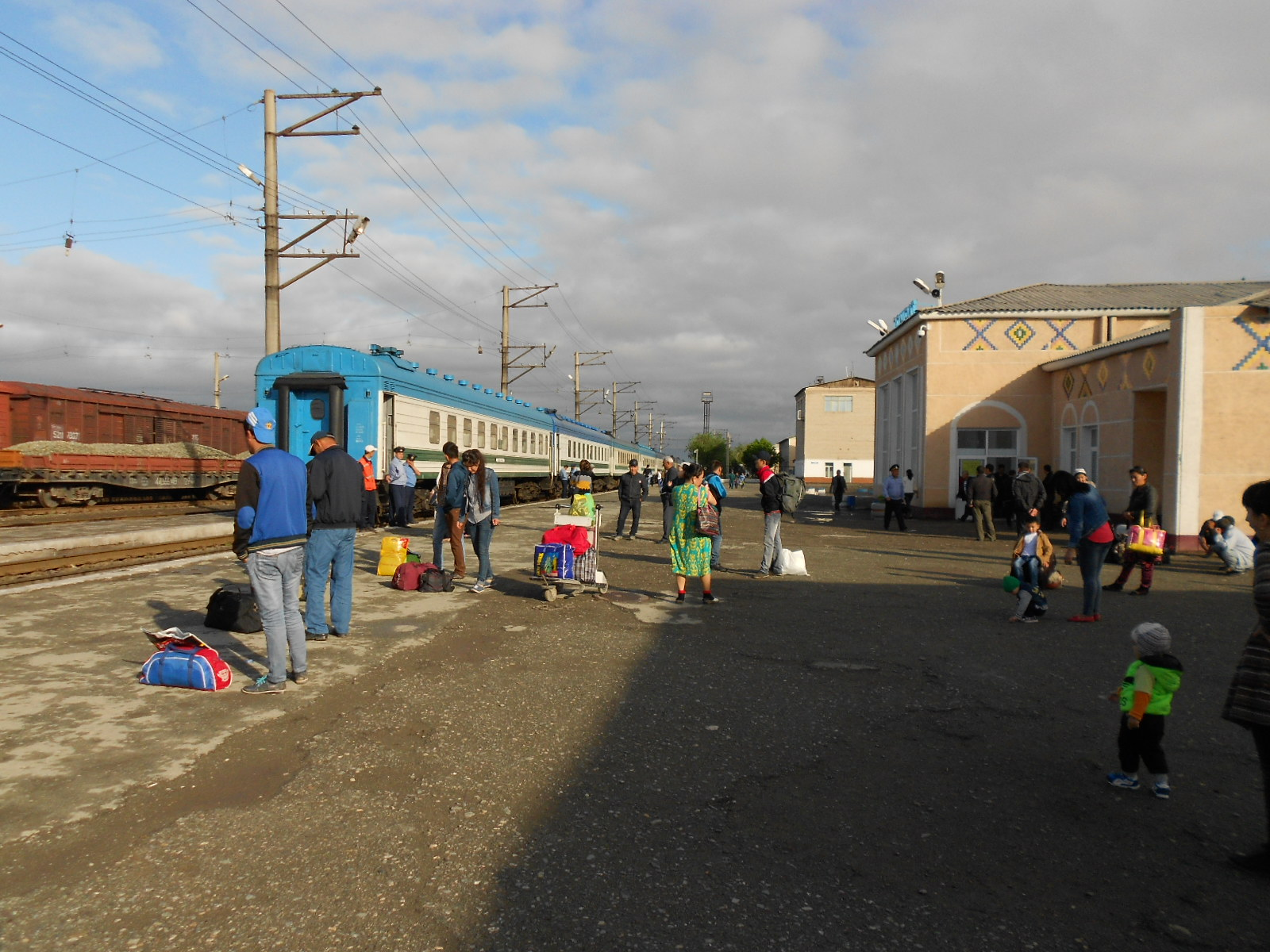
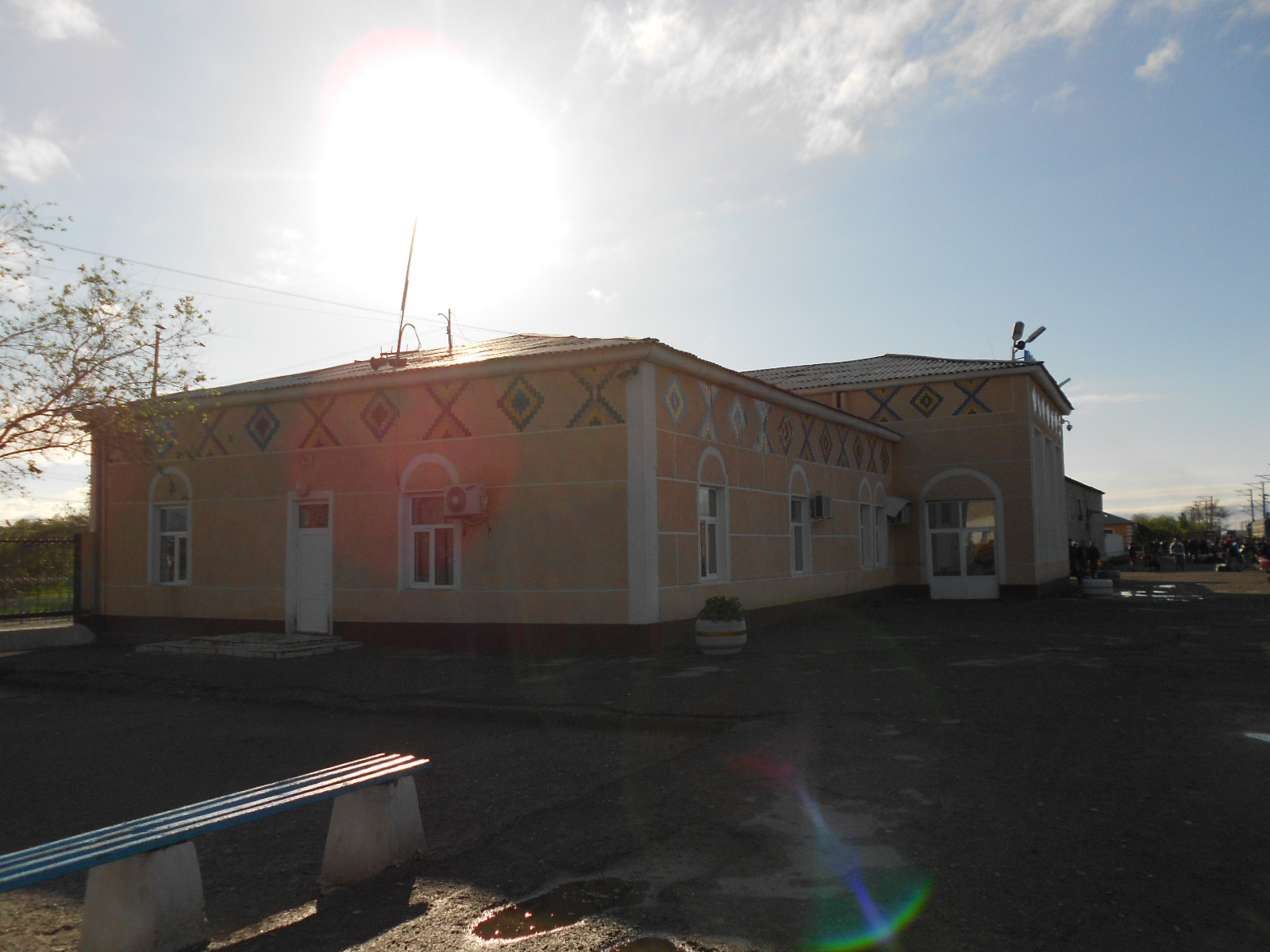
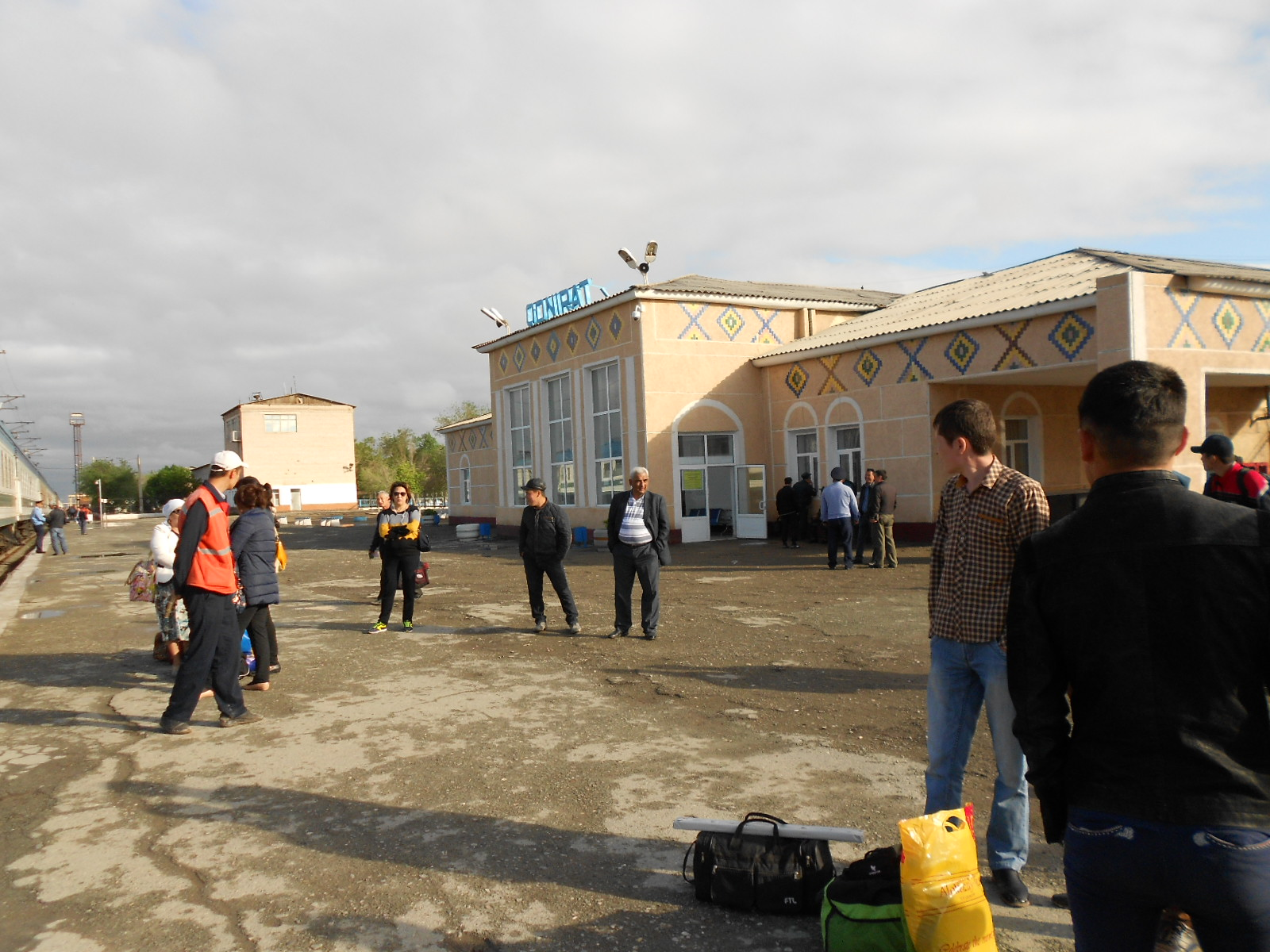
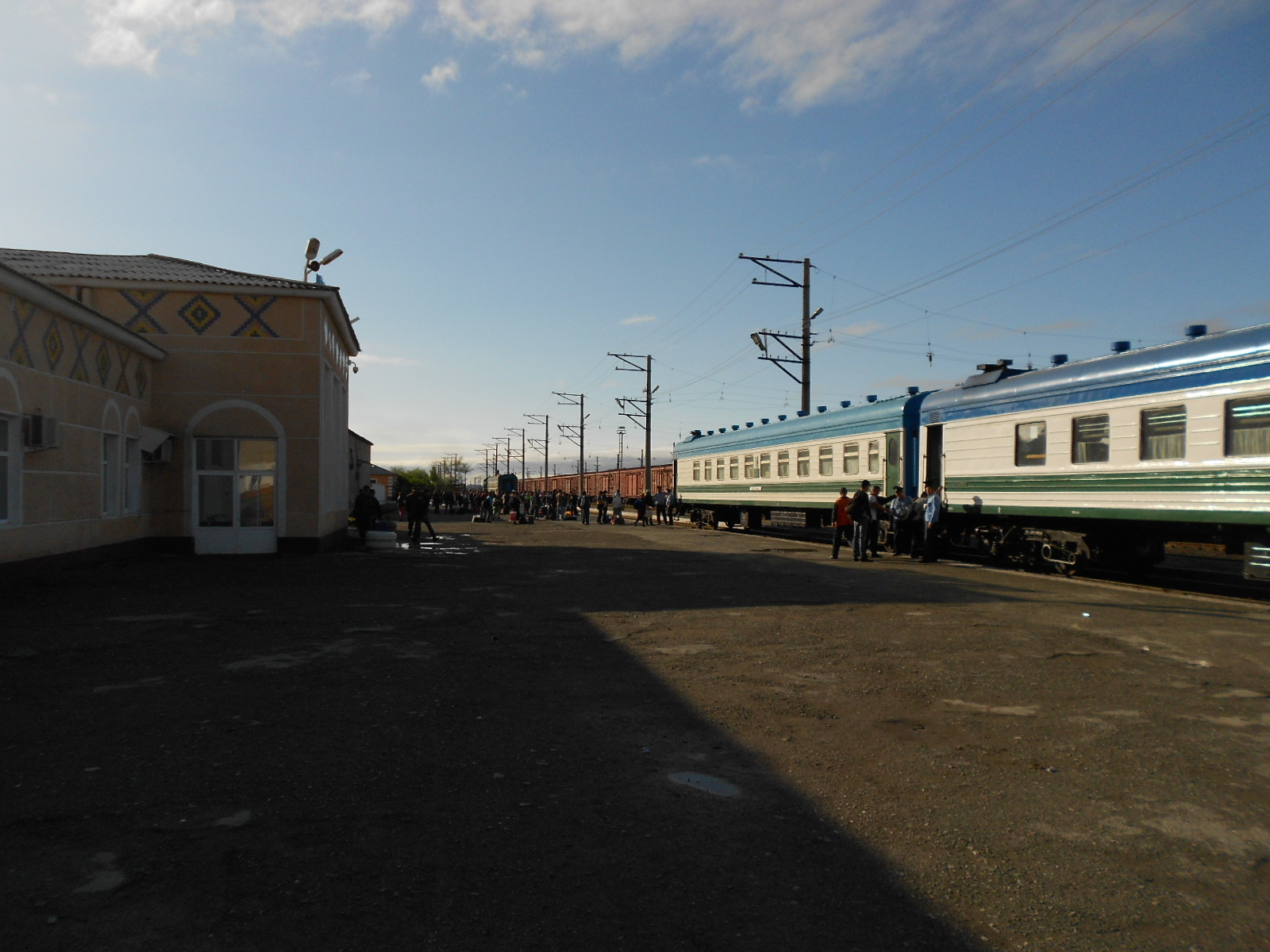

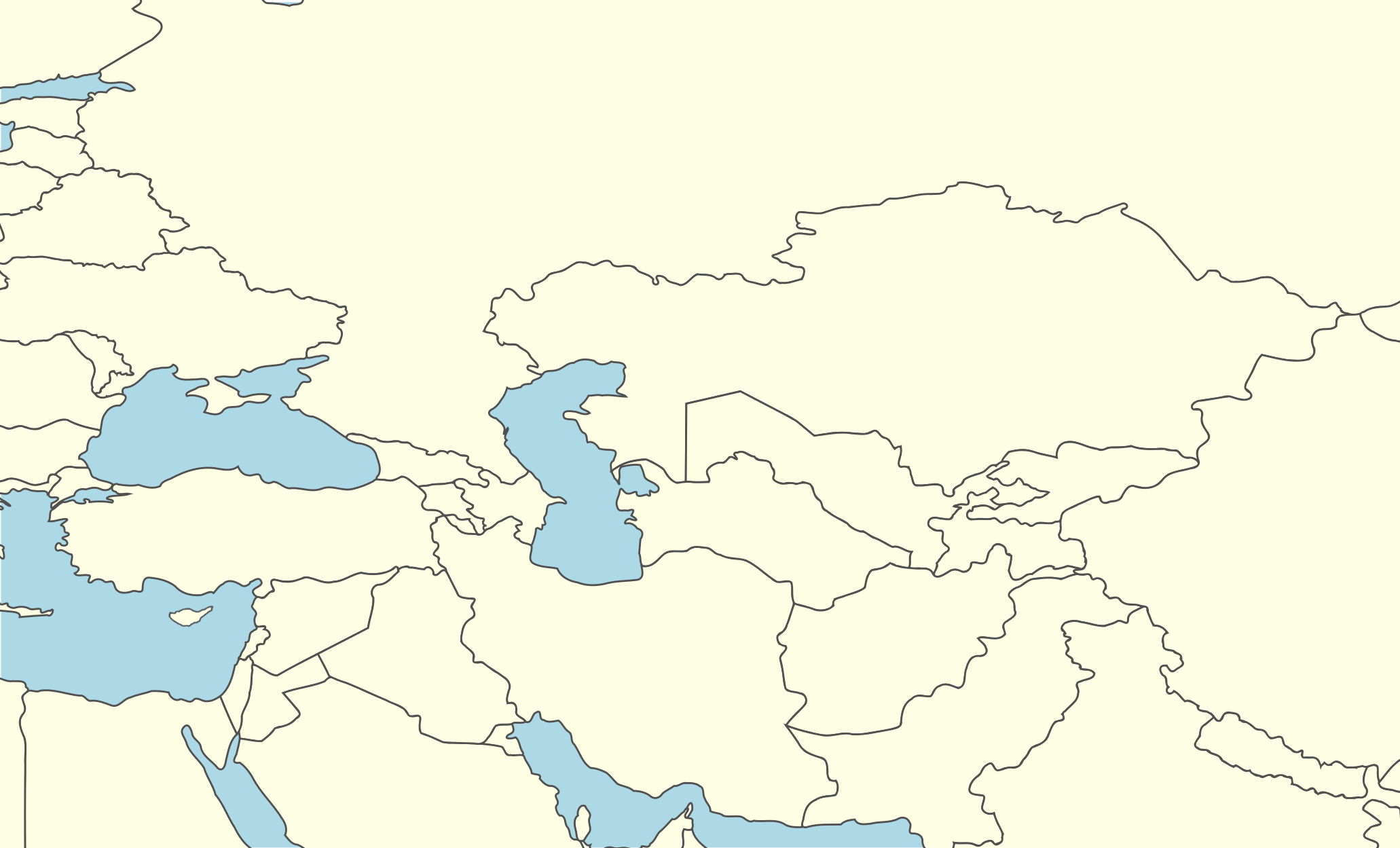
- Location in Uzbekistan Qońırat (Central Asia)
- Coordinates: 43°02′59″N 58°51′15″E
- Country: Uzbekistan
- Suveren Republic: Karakalpakstan
- District: Qońırat district
- Elevation: 60 m (200 ft)

Population (2016)
  - Total: 37,100
- Time zone: UTC+05:00 (UZT)
- Website: kungrad.com

Qońırat, also spelled as Kungrad (Karakalpak: Қоңырат, romanized: Qońırat), formerly known as Zheleznodorozhny (Russian: Железнодорожный, until 1969), is a city in Karakalpakstan, Uzbekistan, located in the Amu Darya delta on the left bank of the river. It is the seat of Qońırat district. Its population was 37,100 in 2016.

In the past it was the centre of caravan routes leading to the Caspian Sea and the Uralsk province.
