= Bundesstraße 49 =

German highway

B 49
- Bundesstraße 49

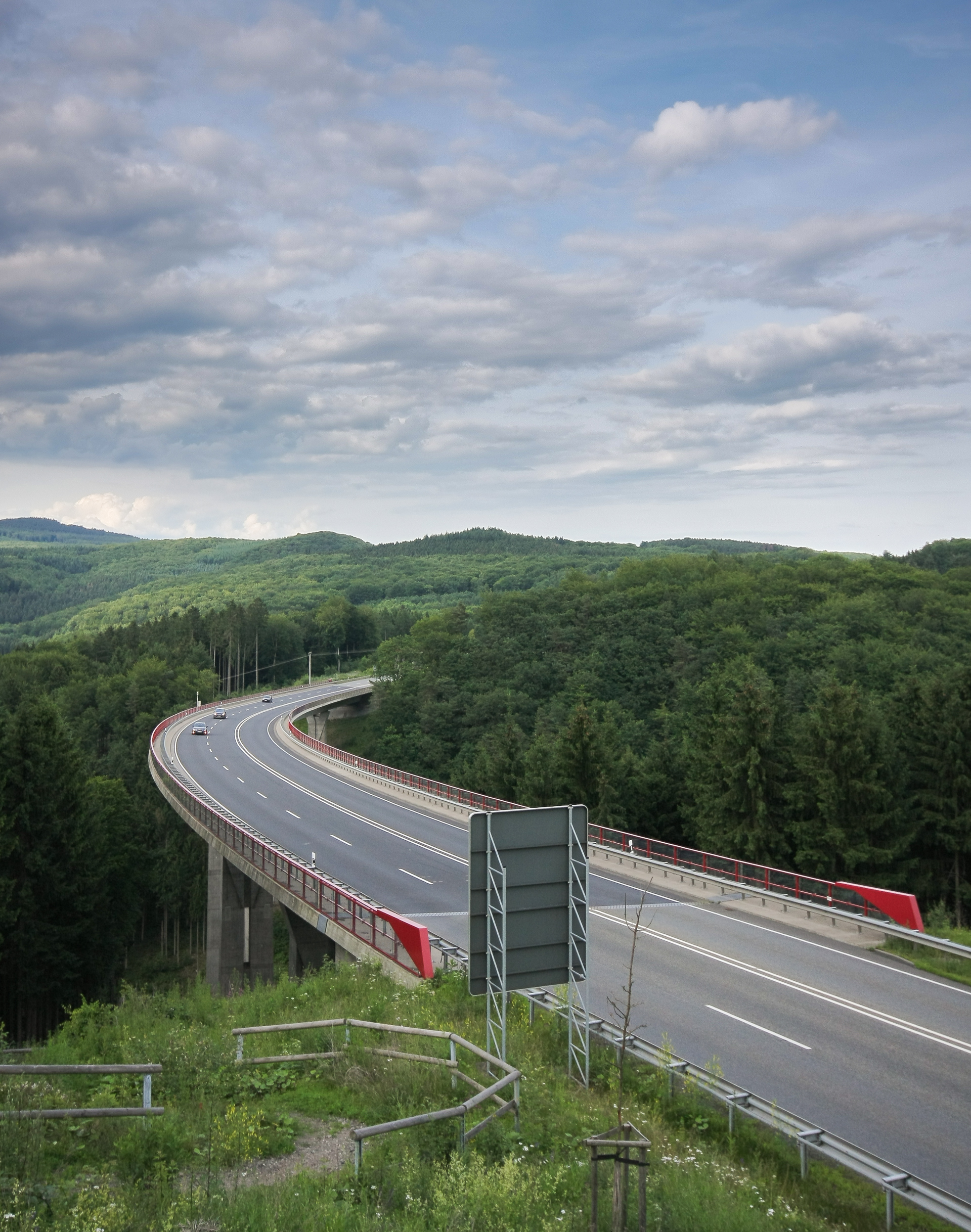

Route information
- Length: 317 km (197 mi)

Major junctions
- From: Alsfeld
- To: Langsur

Location
- Country: Germany
- States: Hesse, Rhineland-Palatinate

Highway system
- Roads in Germany; Autobahns; List; Federal; List; State; E-roads

The Bundesstraße 49 is a German federal highway. It forms part of E40 and E44, running from Alsfeld, Hesse to Langsur, Rhineland-Palatinate near the Luxembourg border.
