= European route E451 =

Road in trans-European E-road network

E451

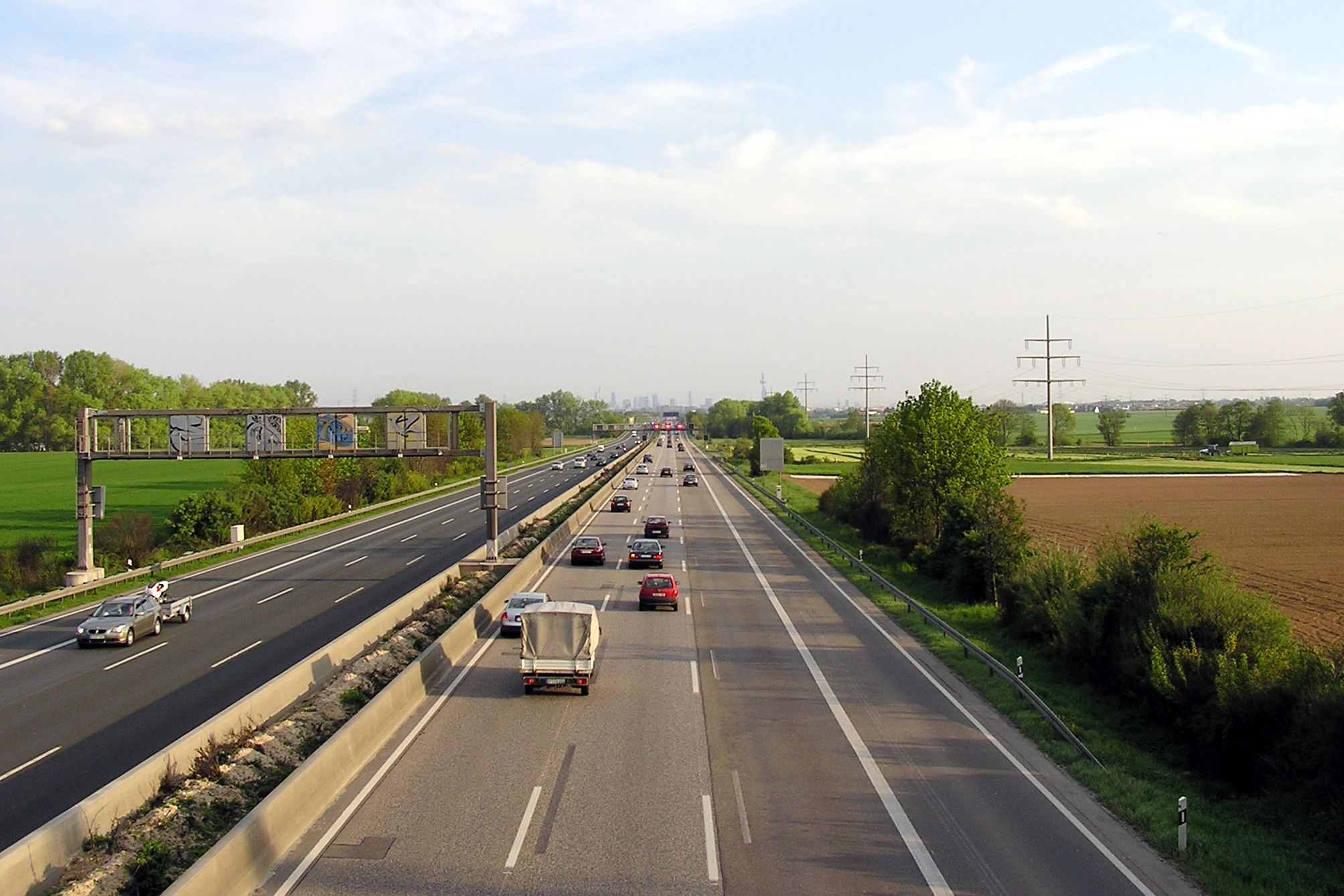
- E451 with Frankfurt in distance

Route information
- Length: 144 km (89 mi)

Major junctions
- From: Giessen
- Frankfurt
- To: Mannheim

Location
- Countries: Germany

Highway system
- International E-road network; A Class; B Class

European route E 451 is a Class B road part of the International E-road network. The E451 is at least 144 kilometres (89 mi) long.

== Route ==
- Germany
  - E40, E4, E44 Giessen
  - E35, E42 Frankfurt
  - E50 Mannheim

== E-routes ==
- The newest route is between 18 and 23 km (11 and 14 mi) above interchanges between E40 and E42 are more possible to extend the route to 111.3 or 116.3 km (69.2 or 72.3 mi).

== Details ==
- New route is at construction (it began in October 2008 and finishing in 2013).
