= Karakalpakia (town) =

Karakalpakia Karakalpakiya
- Urban-type settlement
- Location within Karakalpakstan Location within Uzbekistan
- Coordinates: 44°46′00″N 56°12′00″E
- Country: Uzbekistan
- Autonomous Republic: Karakalpakstan
- District: Qońırat District

Population (2016)
  - Total: 4,500
- Time zone: UTC+5 (UZT)

Karakalpakia (Karakalpak: Karakalpakiya) is an urban-type settlement of Qońırat district in the autonomous Republic of Karakalpakstan in Uzbekistan. Its population was 3,013 people in 1989, and 4,500 in 2016.

== Climate ==
Karakalpakia has a continental desert climate (Köppen: BWk),

Climate data for Karakalpakia (1991–2020)
Month	Jan	Feb	Mar	Apr	May	Jun	Jul	Aug	Sep	Oct	Nov	Dec	Year
Mean daily maximum °C (°F)	−2.8 (27.0)	−0.6 (30.9)	8.7 (47.7)	19.2 (66.6)	27.1 (80.8)	33.3 (91.9)	35.5 (95.9)	34.0 (93.2)	26.4 (79.5)	17.5 (63.5)	6.3 (43.3)	−0.6 (30.9)	17.0 (62.6)
Daily mean °C (°F)	−6.5 (20.3)	−5.2 (22.6)	2.8 (37.0)	12.2 (54.0)	20.0 (68.0)	26.0 (78.8)	28.4 (83.1)	26.4 (79.5)	18.6 (65.5)	10.1 (50.2)	1.3 (34.3)	−4.4 (24.1)	10.8 (51.4)
Mean daily minimum °C (°F)	−9.8 (14.4)	−9.1 (15.6)	−1.8 (28.8)	6.1 (43.0)	12.9 (55.2)	18.2 (64.8)	20.7 (69.3)	18.4 (65.1)	11.2 (52.2)	3.8 (38.8)	−2.8 (27.0)	−7.7 (18.1)	5.0 (41.0)
Average precipitation mm (inches)	15.3 (0.60)	11.9 (0.47)	19.2 (0.76)	21.6 (0.85)	16.4 (0.65)	14.3 (0.56)	8.1 (0.32)	5.5 (0.22)	4.5 (0.18)	11.4 (0.45)	17.1 (0.67)	14.6 (0.57)	159.9 (6.30)
Average precipitation days (≥ 1.0 mm)	13	11	9	7	8	6	5	3	3	5	9	13	92
Mean monthly sunshine hours	95.8	130.8	184.4	231.1	305.6	346.5	356.7	341.0	280.0	223.1	125.7	86.3	2,707
Source: NOAA
