= Wettenberg =

- Municipality
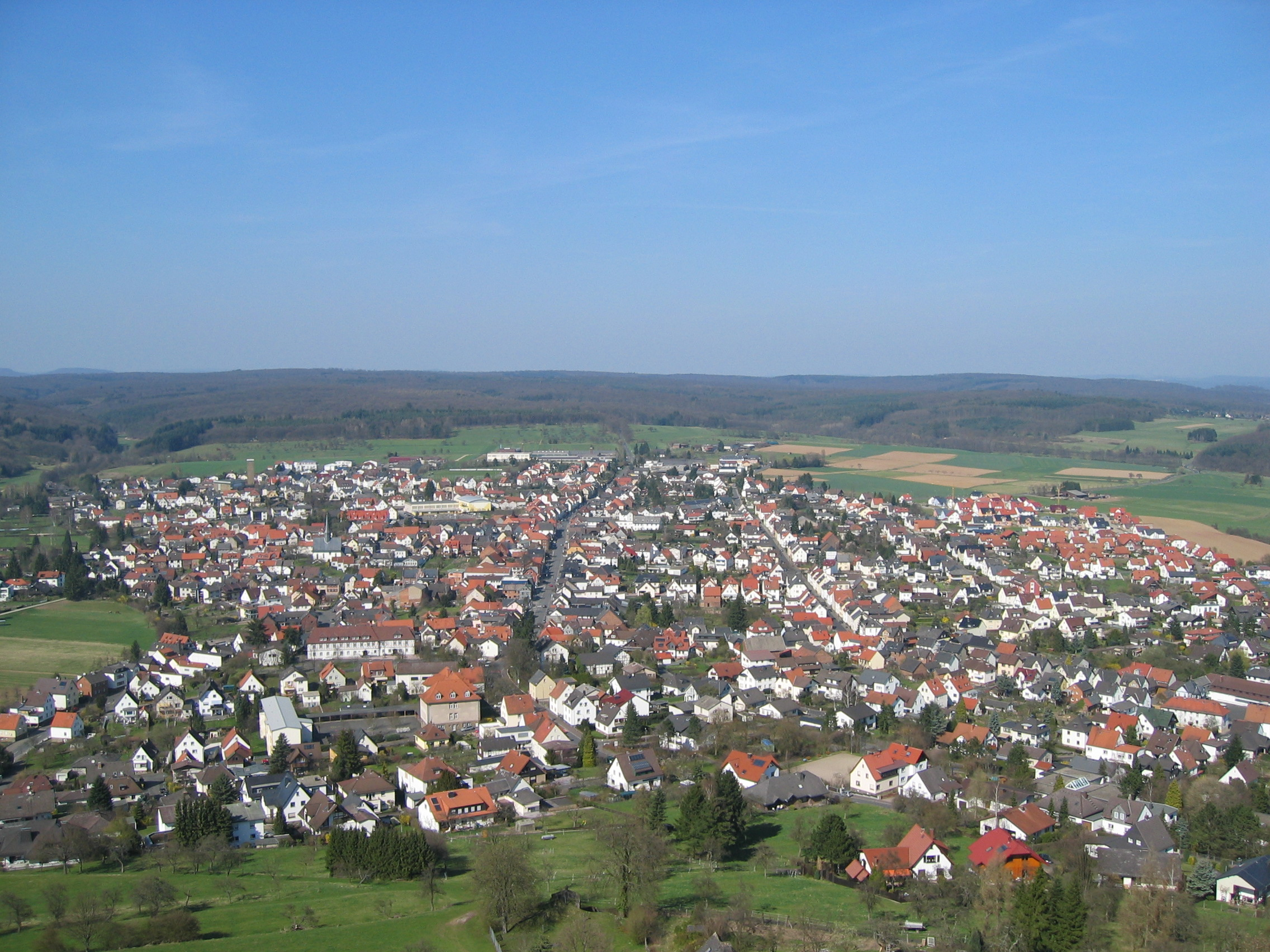
- Wettenberg

- Coat of arms

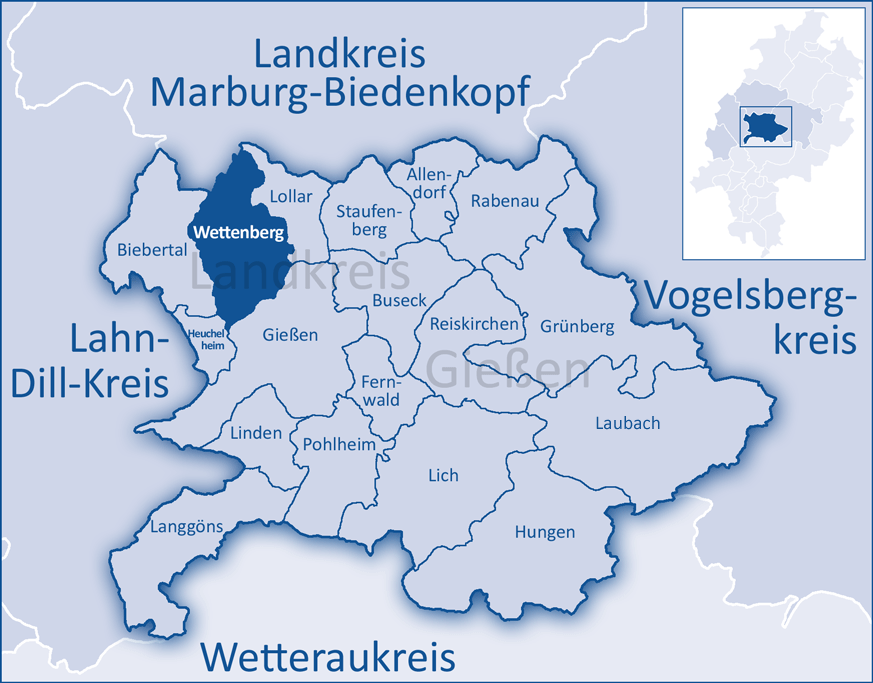
- Location of Wettenberg within Gießen district
- Interactive map of Wettenberg
- Location within Germany Location within Hesse
- Coordinates: 50°37′N 08°39′E
- Country: Germany
- State: Hesse
- Admin. region: Gießen
- District: Gießen

Government
  - Mayor (2021–27): Marc Nees (Ind.)

Area
  - Total: 42.92 km^{2} (16.57 sq mi)
- Elevation: 231 m (758 ft)

Population (2025-12-31)
  - Total: 11,935
  - Density: 278.1/km^{2} (720.2/sq mi)
- Time zone: UTC+01:00 (CET)
  - Summer (DST): UTC+02:00 (CEST)
- Postal codes: 35435
- Dialling codes: 0641 (Krofdorf-Gleiberg, Launsbach)/ 06406 (Wißmar)
- Vehicle registration: GI
- Website: www.wettenberg.de

Wettenberg (German pronunciation: [ˈvɛtn̩bɛʁk]) is a municipality in the district of Gießen, in Hessen, Germany. It is situated 5 km (3.1 mi) northwest of Gießen.
