= Schmalenbach =

Schmalenbach may refer to:

- Eugen Schmalenbach (1873 – 1955), German academic and economist
- Herman Schmalenbach (1885 – 1950), German philosopher
- Schmalenbach (Löhbach), a river of North Rhine-Westphalia, Germany
- Schmalenbach, a district of the town Halver in North Rhine-Westphalia, Germany
