= Bundesautobahn 45 =

Federal motorway in Germany

A 45
- Bundesautobahn 45

Route information
- Length: 257 km (160 mi)

Major junctions
- North end: A 2 in Dortmund
- South end: A 3 in Seligenstadt

Location
- Country: Germany
- States: North Rhine-Westphalia, Hesse, Bavaria

Highway system
- Roads in Germany; Autobahns; List; Federal; List; State; E-roads
← A 44	→ A 46

Bundesautobahn 45 (translates from German as Federal Motorway 45, short form Autobahn 45, abbreviated as BAB 45 or A 45) is an autobahn in Germany, connecting Dortmund in the west with Aschaffenburg in the southwest. It is colloquially known as the Sauerlandlinie (Sauerland line) as it runs through the hilly, rural Sauerland region between Hagen and Siegen. The A45 has many bridges to cross valleys, the highest of which is the Sichter Valley bridge (Talbrücke Sichter) between Lüdenscheid and Meinerzhagen at 530 metres above mean sea level. It is mostly two lanes each way with frequent climbing lanes between Dortmund-Hafen and the Gambacher Kreuz intersection. In March 2013 30 people were injured in a pile-up on the A45.

== History ==
During the 1960s and 1970s a southward extension was proposed as the „Odenwald-Neckar-Alb-Autobahn“ (ONAA), to pass through Groß-Umstadt, Michelstadt, Schwaigern, Neckarwestheim, Mundelsheim, Berglen, Remshalden, Lichtenwald and Schlierbach, linking the ONAA to the A 8 near Kirchheim unter Teck, however the project was abandoned for ecological reasons in 1979 by the state government of Baden-Württemberg.

== Trajectory ==
The A 45 branches off the A 2 at the Dortmund Nord-West intersection, passes through the eastern Ruhr area and enters the Sauerland near Hagen. It then enters the Siegerland and the state of Hesse, where the A 45 is joined by the A 66 between the interchanges Hanauer Kreuz and Langenselbolder Dreieck. A short stretch of road, between junctions Alzenau and Mainhausen, is on Bavarian territory, then the A 45 merges with the A 3 at the interchange Seligenstädter Dreieck in the state of Hesse, just to the west of the Bavarian city of Aschaffenburg. The Rahmede viaduct near Lüdenscheid was closed on 2 December 2021, due to damage to its structure. It was demolished in May 2023 and is due to be replaced.

== Numerical listing of Exits and Junctions ==
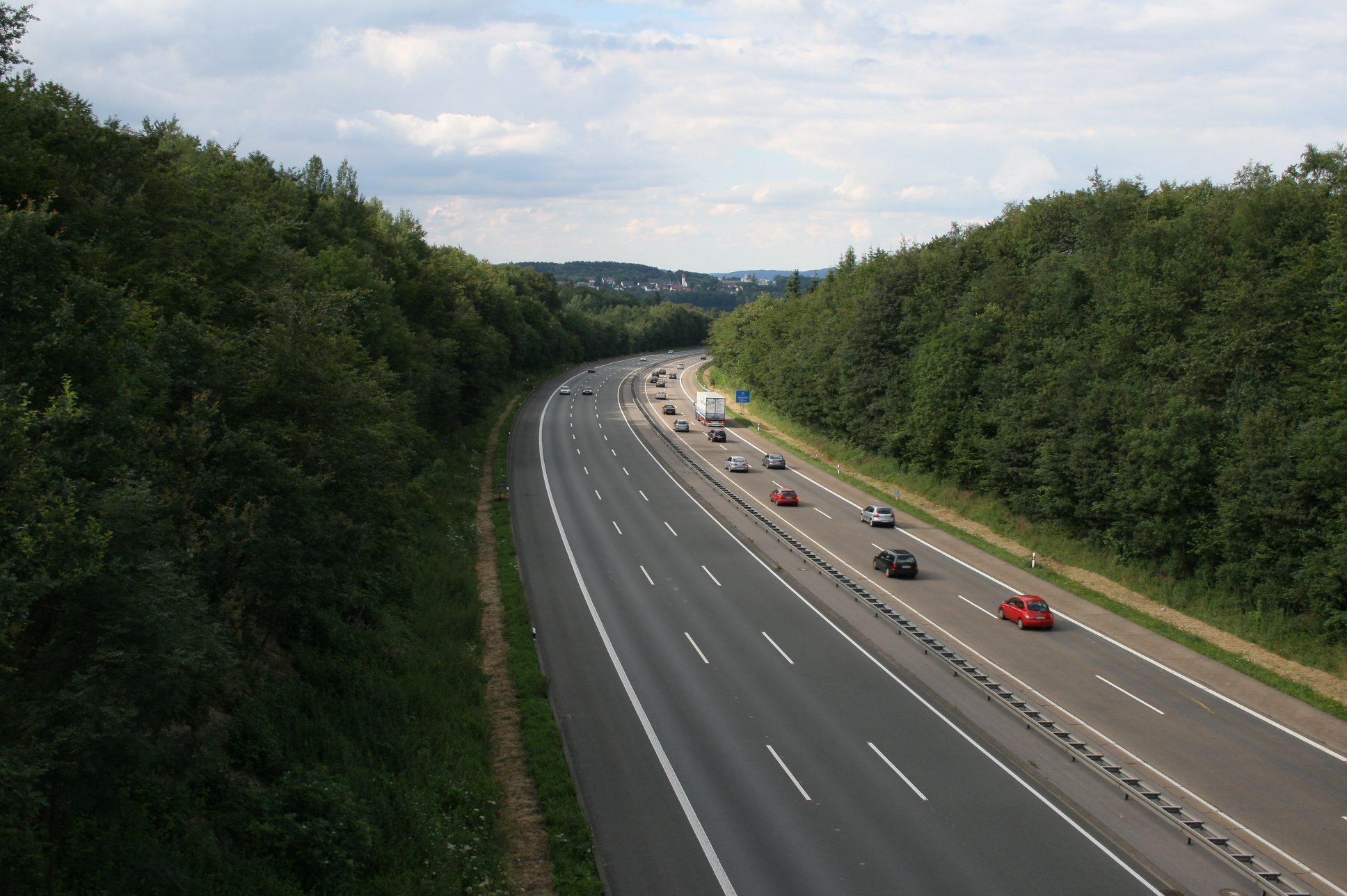
A 45 near Lüdenscheid view north

(2)	Dortmund-Nordwest 4-way interchange A 2
(3)	Castrop-Rauxel-Ost 4-way interchange A 42
(4)	Dortmund-Hafen
(5)	Dortmund-West 4-way interchange A 40 B 1
(6)	Dortmund-Eichlinghofen
(7)	Dortmund / Witten 4-way interchange A 44
(8)	Dortmund-Süd B 54
(9)	Westhofener Kreuz A 1
	Ruhrbrücke
(10)	Schwerte-Ergste
	Lennetalbrücke
(11)	Hagen 4-way interchange A 46
(12)	Hagen-Süd
	Talbrücke Kattenohl 300 m
	Talbrücke Brunsbecke 500 m
	Talbrücke Sürenhagen
	Talbrücke Eichelnbleck
	Raststätte Rölveder Mühle + Kaltenborn
(13)	Lüdenscheid-Nord
	Rahmedetalbrücke 453 m
(14)	Lüdenscheid
	Services Sauerland
(15)	Lüdenscheid-Süd
	Talbrücke Homert 200 m
	Talbrücke Sichter 400 m
	Talbrücke Immecke 200 m
(16)	Meinerzhagen
	Talbrücke Beustenbach 400 m
	Talbrücke Lüdespert 300 m
	Talbrücke Bleche 557 m
	Talbrücke Germinghausen 200 m
(17)	Drolshagen-Wegeringhausen
	Talbrücke Wintersohl 300 m
(18)	Olpe B 54
	Talbrücke Rosenthal 400 m
	Talbrücke Rüblinghausen 300 m
	Talbrücke Sassmicke 700 m
(19)	Olpe-Süd 4-way interchange A 4
	Talbrücke Gerlingen 400 m
	Talbrücke Ottfingen 200 m
	Talbrücke Büschergrund 400 m
(20)	Freudenberg / Siegen-West
	Services Siegerland
(21)	Siegen B 62
	Siegtalbrücke 1.050 m
(22)	Siegen-Eisern
	Talbrücke Eisern 327m
(23)	Wilnsdorf
	N.N 400 m
(24)	Haiger / Burbach B 54
	Talbrücke Kalteiche 500 m
	Dilltalbrücke Haiger 801 m
	Talbrücke Sechshelden 1.100 m
(25)	Dillenburg B 277
	Marbachtalbrücke 500 m
	Lützelbachtalbrücke 300 m
	Ambachtalbrücke 438 m
	Windelbachtalbrücke 400 m
	Services Dollenberg
	Kallenbachtalbrücke 200 m
(26)	Herborn-West B 255
(27)	Herborn-Süd B 277
	Rehbachbrücke 200 m
	Heubachtalbrücke 300 m
	Dilltalbrücke Edingen 801 m
	Onsbachtalbrücke 300 m
	Volkersbachtalbrücke 300 m
	Services Katzenfurt
(28)	Ehringshausen
	Lemptalbrücke 300 m
	Kreuzbachtalbrücke 300 m
	Talbrücke Bechlingen 300 m
	Bornbachtalbrücke 300 m
(29)	Wetzlarer Kreuz A 480
	Blasbachtalbrücke 500 m
	Lahnbrücke 500 m
(30)	Wetzlar-Ost B 49 E40 E44
(31)	Wetzlar-Süd
	Talbrücke Münchholzhausen 600 m
(32)	Gießen-Lützellinden
(33)	Gießener Südkreuz A 485 B 3
	Talbrücke Langgöns 440 m
(35)	Gambacher Kreuz A 5
(36)	Münzenberg B 488
(37)	Wölfersheim B 455
(38)	Florstadt B 275
(39)	Altenstadt B 521
	Services Langen - Bergheim
(41)	Langenselbold-West
(42)	Langenselbolder Dreieck A 66
	Kinzigbrücke
(43)	Hanauer Kreuz A 66 B 43a
(44)	Alzenau
(45a)	Karlstein
(45b)	Kleinostheim B 8
	Mainbrücke 450 m
(46)	Mainhausen
(47)	Seligenstadt 3-way interchange A 3
