= Glaum =

Glaum is a surname. Notable people with the surname include:

- Julia Glaum (born 1980), German and Norwegian materials scientist
- Louise Glaum (1888–1970), American actress
- Martin Glaum (born 1962), German economist
