= Freebach =

River in Germany

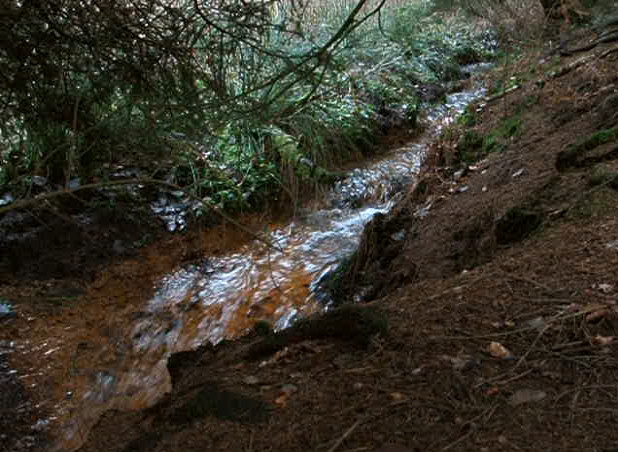

Location
- Country: Germany
- State: North Rhine-Westphalia

Physical characteristics
- Mouth
  - location: Heilenbecke
  - coordinates: 51.2510°N 7.3709°E

Basin features
- Progression: Heilenbecke→ Ennepe→ Volme→ Ruhr→ Rhine→ North Sea

Freebach is a small river of North Rhine-Westphalia, Germany. It is a tributary of the Heilenbecke near Breckerfeld.

== See also ==
- List of rivers of North Rhine-Westphalia
