= Philip III of Falkenstein =

German aristocrat (1257–1322)

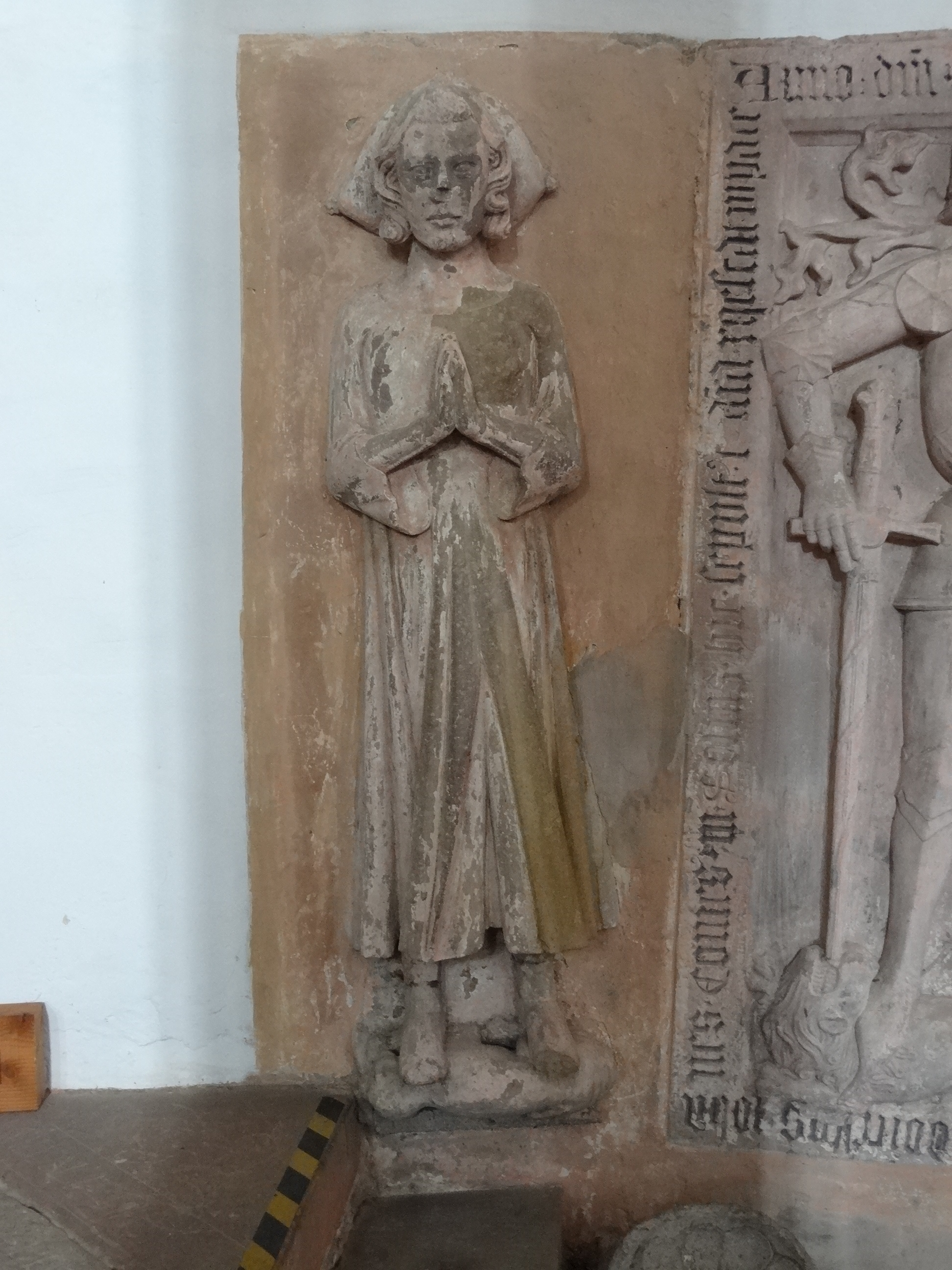
Probable tombstone of Philip in the Marienstiftskirche, Lich

Philip III of Falkenstein (German: Philipp III. von Falkenstein, 1257 – 9 February 1322), Lord of Falkenstein, Münzenberg and Lich, Hesse was a member of the Lich line of the Falkenstein dynasty, son of Werner I of Falkenstein, Lord of Münzenberg and Falkenstein, who founded the Lich line, and his wife Mechtild of Diez (1238 – 3 December 1288).

== Ancestry ==
Philip III was a member of the Bolanden-Falkenstein family, which were originally based at Falkenstein Castle, in Donnersbergkreis in the Palatinate and had held part of the Münzenberg Inheritance in Wetterau since 1255.

== Lordship ==
Before 1295, his father Werner I had moved his seat away from Münzenburg to the nearby town of Lich after he had inherited another part of the Münzenberg Inheritance. Philip had a large water castle built at Lich, in order to protect the spot where the Lange Hessen road crossed the Wetter river. While in the service of the German King Albert I, the king promoted Lich to the rank of town by a charter of 10 March 1300 – it had already been referred to as "oppidum nostrum" (our town) in 1297. In 1313, Emperor Henry VII promoted Königstein im Taunus to town rank as well, which had formerly belonged to the Nürings and had been part of the Falkensteins' domains since 1255.

A long-running conflict with Ulrich I of Hanau over the Münzenburg Inheritance and especially the Jewish tax of Assenheim and Münzenberg was brought to an end in 1304 with an arbitration in Philip's favour.

== Family ==
Philip married, first, in 1287, Mechthild of Eppstein (1269–1303), daughter of Gottfried IV of Eppstein and Mathilde of Isenburg. They had the following children:

- Elisabeth of Falkenstein (died 1 September 1328), who married Raugrave Henry III of Neuenbaumburg
- Isengard of Falkenstein (1280–1326), who married Luther of Isenburg-Grenzau
- Werner of Falkenstein (died 1309)
- Ulrich II of Falkenstein (died 1307)
- Philipp IV of Falkenstein (1272–1312), who married Adelheid of Rieneck in 1294.

He married, secondly, in 1303, Luckard(e) of Isenburg (died 11 October 1309), an illegitimate daughter of Ludwig I of Isenburg von Cleeburg, Burggrave of Gelnhausen, with whom he had the following children:

- Elsa of Falkenstein (died 1317)
- Kuno II of Falkenstein-Münzenberg (died 14 May 1333), who married Anna of Nassau-Hadamar, daughter of Emicho I, Count of Nassau-Hadamar (died 1329) and Imagina of Bickenbach (died 1367).

He married thirdly, on 11 October 1309, Mechtild of Hesse (1267 – after 1332), widow of Gottfried VI of Ziegenhain, daughter of Landgrave Henry I of Hesse and Adelheid of Brunswick, who was a descendant of Saint Elizabeth of Thuringia.

Most of the tombs of the Lich line of the Falkenstein family are located in the Marienstiftskirche in Lich.

== Bibliography ==
- Anette Löffler: Die Herren und Grafen von Falkenstein (Taunus). Studien zur Territorial- und Besitzgeschichte, zur reichspolitischen Stellung und zur Genealogie eines führenden Ministerialengeschlechts 1255-1418. Volume 99. Self-published by the Hessischen Historischen Kommission Darmstadt und der Historischen Kommission für Hessen, 1994.
- Johann Friedrich Böhmer: Regesten zur Geschichte der Mainzer Erzbischöfe: Von Konrad I. bis Heinrich II. 1161 – 1288. 1886.
- Licher Heimatbuch., edited by the Commission for the Licher Heimatbuch. Lich 1950.
- Licher Heimatbuch. Die Kernstadt und ihre Stadtteile. Edited by Paul Görlich and the Magistrat der Stadt Lich 1989.
- Johann Georg Lehmann: "Urkundliche Geschichte der Herren und Grafen von Falkenstein am Donnersberg in der Pfalz" in: "Mitteilungen des Historischen Vereins der Pfalz", Band 3, 1872, ISBN 5875574151, Daniel Kranzbühler'sche Buchdruckerei, Speyer
- Adolph Köllner: "Versuch einer Geschichte der Grafschaft Falkenstein" in "Geschichte der Herrschaft Kirchheim-Boland und Stauf", 1854, Wiesbaden
