= Borbach (Ennepe) =

River in Germany

Location
- Country: Germany
- State: North Rhine-Westphalia

Physical characteristics
- Mouth
  - location: Ennepe
  - coordinates: 51.2277°N 7.4079°E

Basin features
- Progression: Ennepe→ Volme→ Ruhr→ Rhine→ North Sea

Borbach is a river of North Rhine-Westphalia, Germany. It is 2.8 km long and a left tributary of the Ennepe.

== See also ==
- List of rivers of North Rhine-Westphalia
