= Gambacher Kreuz =

Gambacher Keuz
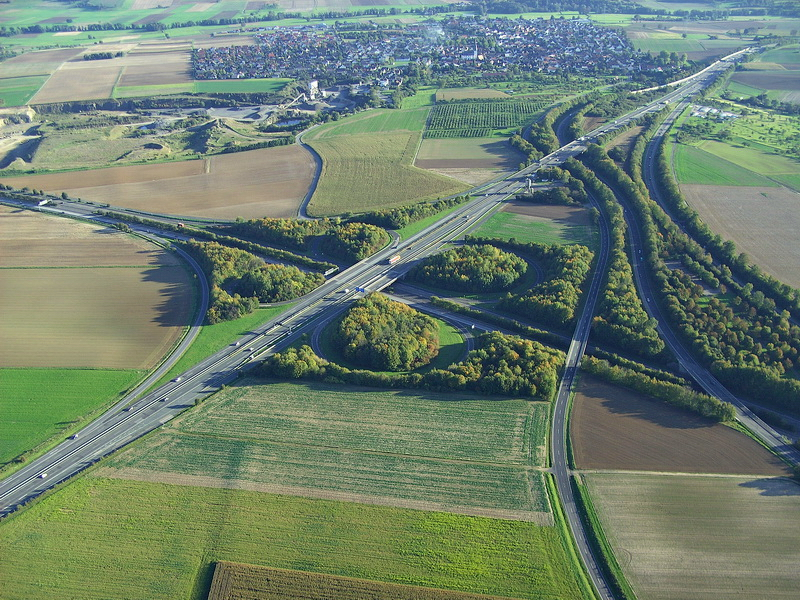

Location
- Münzenberg, Germany
- Coordinates: 50°28′27.87″N 8°43′36.72″E: A 45 E41; A 5 E451

Construction
- Type: Cloverleaf interchange with a direct link
- Lanes: 2x2/2x2
- Opened: 1971 (extended in 1976)

The Gambacher Kreuz (Gambach interchange) is a cloverleaf interchange in Hesse, Germany where the A5 Autobahn from Basel to Bad Hersfeld intersects the A45 between Dortmund and Aschaffenburg. It constitutes a node in the primary route between the Rhein-Main metropolitan area and the eastern end of the Ruhr valley.

== Geography ==
The interchange is located between the villages of Münzenberg in Wetteraukreis to the south and Holzheim, a part of Pohlheim in Landkreis Gießen, to the north. It is within a triangle formed by Gießen, Frankfurt am Main and Wetzlar.

== History ==
The Gambacher Kreuz was built when the A45 Dortmund-Gießen, also known as the Sauerlandlinie (Sauerland Line), was constructed. It opened in 1971 as a trumpet interchange to the south and an incomplete junction to the north onto the A5. The trumpet interchange design left room for extension to cloverleaf interchange, which was completed in 1976.

A route guidance system was installed at the intersection in 2010.

== Traffic ==
Around 125,000 vehicles pass through the interchange each day. Results of a 2010 traffic census are:

| From | To | Average daily traffic | Heavy goods vehicles |
|---|---|---|---|
| Fernwald junction (A 5) | Gambacher Kreuz | 51,800 | 14.3 % |
| Gambacher Kreuz | Butzbach junction (A 5) | 95,200 | 14.0 % |
| Gießen South (A 45) | Gambacher Kreuz | 71,400 | 14.6 % |
| Gambacher Kreuz | Münzenberg junction (A 45) | 31,200 | 15.6 % |
