= Borbach =

Borbach may refer to:

- Borbach (Ennepe), a river of North Rhine-Westphalia, Germany
- Borbach (Ruhr), a river of North Rhine-Westphalia, Germany

== See also ==
- Borbach Chantry, a building in West Dean, Sussex, England
