= Sichter =

River in Germany

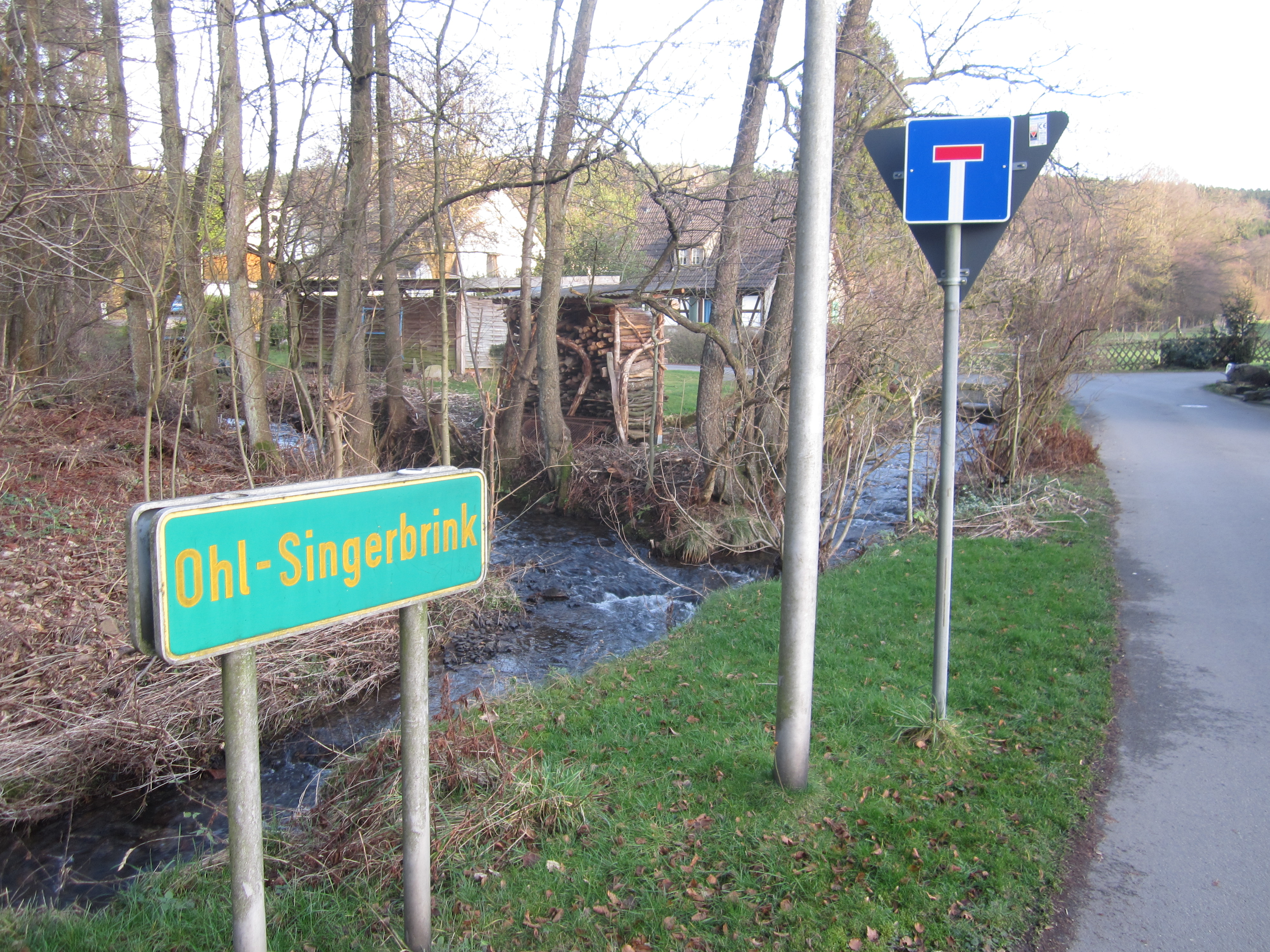

Location
- Country: Germany
- State: North Rhine-Westphalia

Physical characteristics
- Mouth
  - location: Wiebelsaat
  - coordinates: 51.1293°N 7.6468°E

Basin features
- Progression: Wiebelsaat→ Volme→ Ruhr→ Rhine→ North Sea

Sichter is a small river of North Rhine-Westphalia, Germany. It is 2.6 km (1.6 mi) long and is a left tributary of the Wiebelsaat.

== See also ==
- List of rivers of North Rhine-Westphalia
