= Schmalenbach (Löhbach) =

River in Germany

Location
- Country: Germany
- States: North Rhine-Westphalia

Physical characteristics
- Mouth
  - location: Löhbach
  - coordinates: 51.1987°N 7.4670°E

Basin features
- Progression: Löhbach→ Ennepe→ Volme→ Ruhr→ Rhine→ North Sea

Schmalenbach is a small river of North Rhine-Westphalia, Germany. It is 1.7 km (1.1 mi) long and is a left tributary of the Löhbach near Halver.

== See also ==
- List of rivers of North Rhine-Westphalia
