= Marienstiftskirche, Lich =

Lutheran hall church in Lich, Middle Hesse, Germany

Coordinates: 50°31′14″N 8°49′10″E

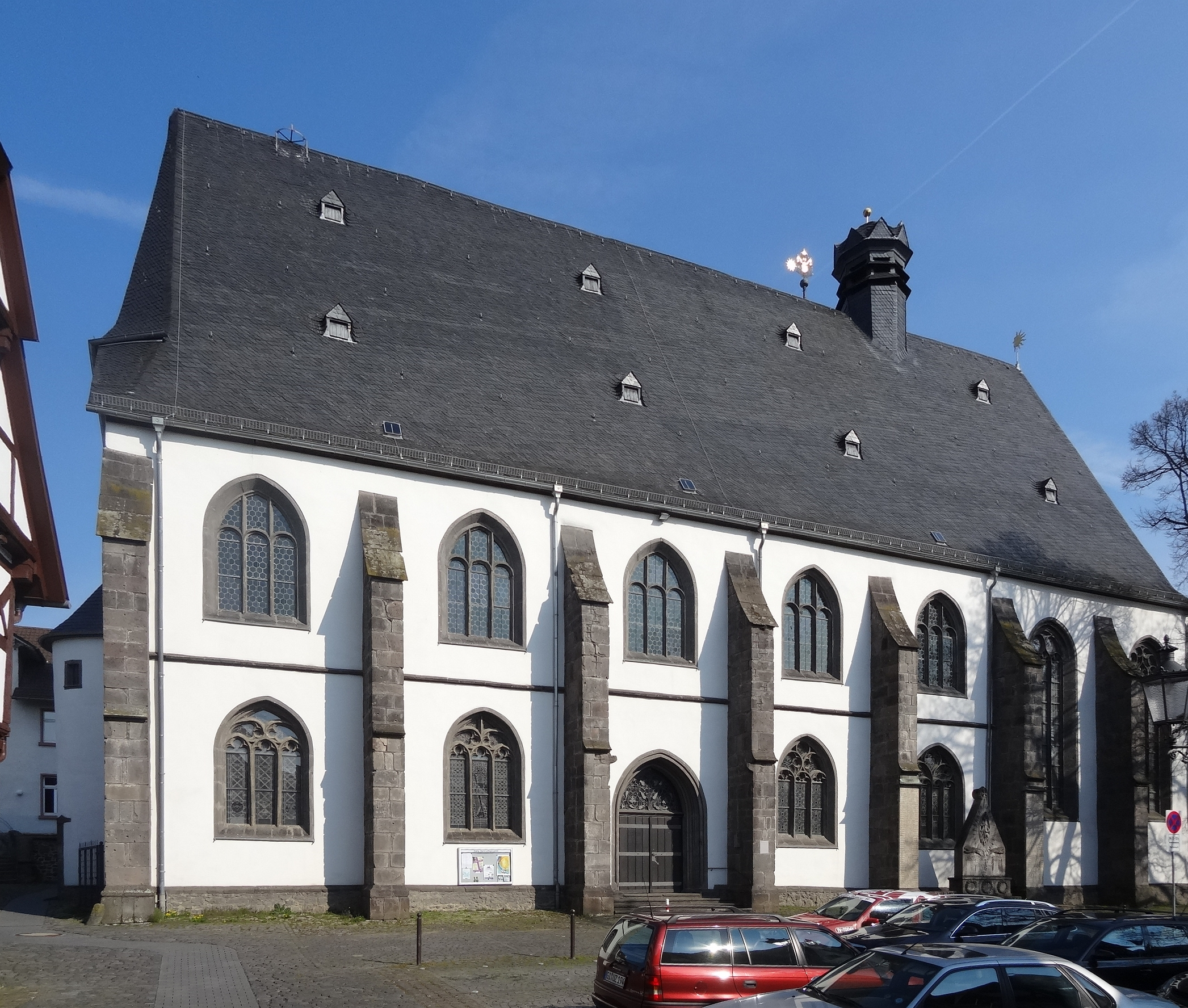
South side of the Marienstiftskirche

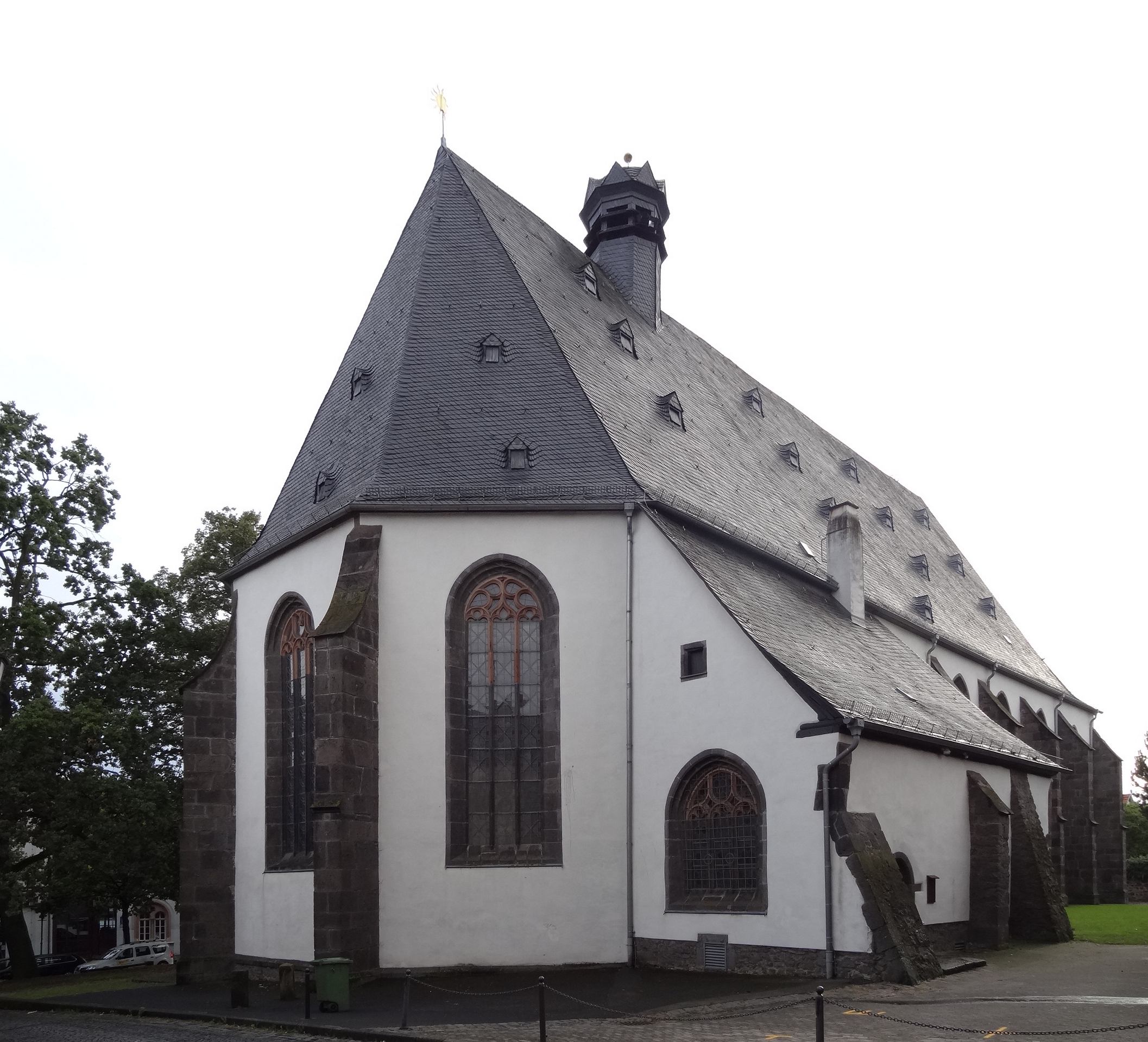
Marienstiftskirche from the northeast

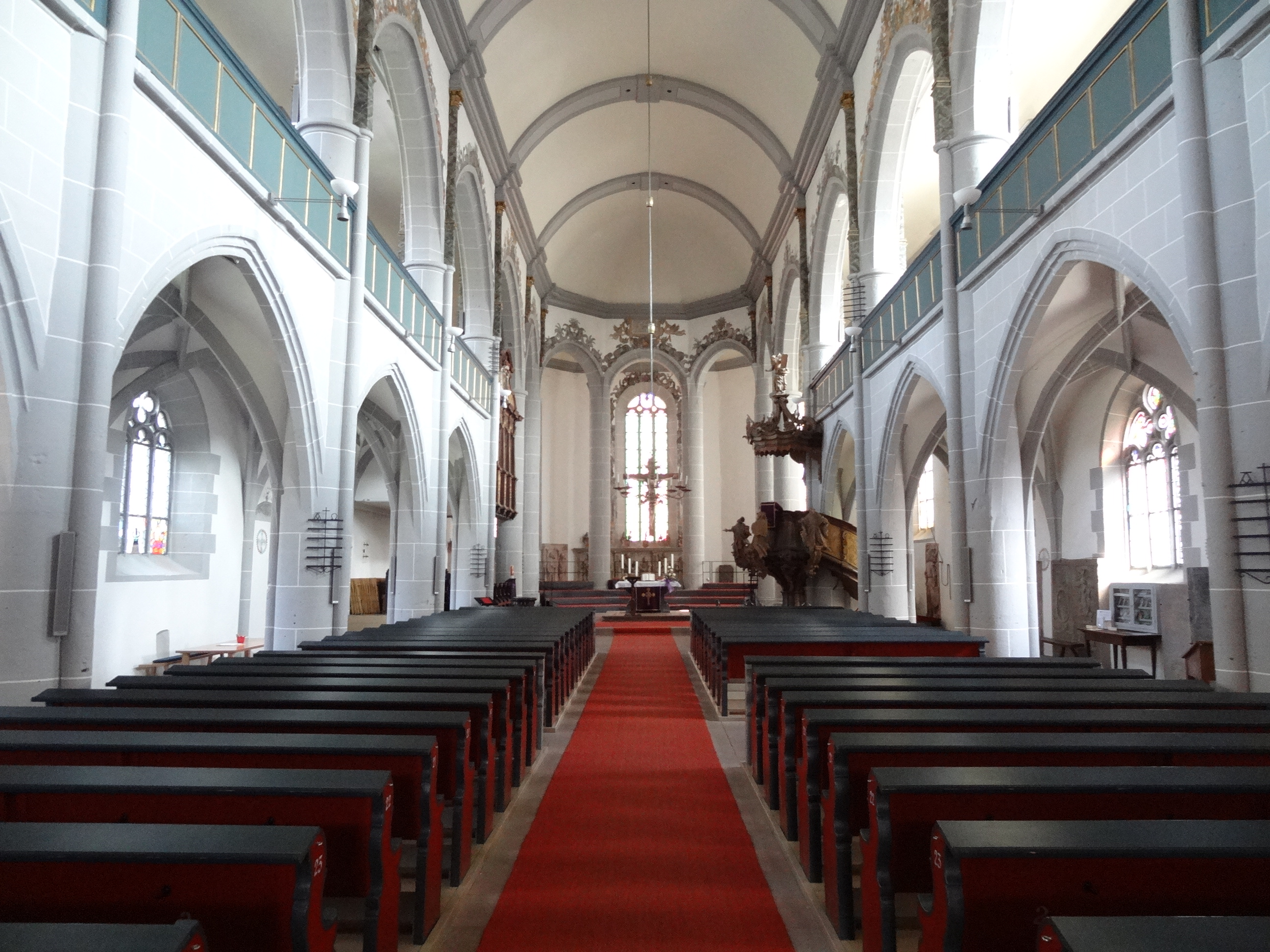
Interior view of the Marienstiftskirche, looking toward the choir

The Marienstiftskirche is a Lutheran three-aisled hall church in Lich, Middle Hesse, Germany. It was built between 1510 and 1537, making it the last Late Gothic hall church to be built in Hesse. The architectural style straddles the transition between Gothic and Renaissance. It is a Hessian heritage site and contains objects of national art historical significance. The neighbouring Stadtturm, with its historic triple peal serves as a clocktower for the Marienstiftskirche.

== History ==
A parish is attested in Lich in the year 1239, which presupposes a church existed by that date. In 1316, the Marienstift was founded by Philip III of Falkenstein, as a collegiate church (German: Kollegiatstift) with ten canons, which was intended to educate young men for the priesthood. Three neighbouring churches were incorporated along with Lich. A large amount of property of the surrounding churches and districts was donated for the maintenance of the college. In the year of the college's foundation, a new, stone church was begun which was roughly two-thirds the size of the present building. The hall church, with a long choir and rood screen was consecrated to Mary on 7 May 1320. It survived less than two hundred years. In 1510 it was entirely demolished to make way for the construction of the present building on the same site. Only a few sections of wall in the west wall survive.

Philip, Count of Solms-Lich was responsible for the new structure and contributed to the plans. Meister Michael of Nürnberg produced a plan for the new building in 1509 at the instruction of the Count, which was modified in 1510 by Nikolaus of Wetzlar. The construction began in 1510 and was completed in 1537. Models for the new Marienstiftskirche include the Church of the Holy Spirit in Heidelberg, the Stadtkirche in Wittenberg and former Barfüßerkirche in Eisenach - all three-aisled hall churches with a northern sacristy and no transept. The plans were not followed exactly, but were modified in 1515 during construction, to incorporate novel Renaissance elements. The construction of a gallery in the choir was not ultimately realised. After the foundations were dug in spring 1511, the walls of the long sides of the church were under construction until October of that year. The construction of the arcades, the vaults of the side aisles and the roof work was undertaken in 1512. Philip, who was the guardian of the Amt of Coburg until 1514, sourced timber from the distant town of Lichtenfels. On 20 September 1512, 88 carts of lumber arrived in Lich from Hanau. In 1514 and 1515, stone was quarried in Hardt and Lower Albach. Contrary to the usual order, the non-vaulted nave was built first in 1514 and the choir and sacristy were completed subsequently, in 1525. The buttresses on the north, east and south walls were only added in 1537.

In the later Middle Ages Lich belonged to the Archdeaconate of St. Maria ad Gradus in the Archbishopric of Mainz with its own Send district - in 1435 it was not included in the Send jurisdiction of the archdiaconate. The collegiate church possessed four altars, dedicated to Our Lady, the Holy Trinity, St John, and St Anne. As a result of the Reformation, the collegiate church was converted to Lutheranism in 1555. The first Lutheran priest was Heinrich Götz who served from 1564 to 1567. The church was renovated in 1594, as recorded by an inscription in a medallion above the choir, "One thousand five hundred four and Ninety years after Christ's birth, This church building's Renovation was With god's help brought to completion entirely in the same Year that saw The Groundstones Beginning to be laid." Galleries were built, the floor was plastered, and the church was painted. In 1622, a gallery was added for the new organ.

The whole ceiling was replaced between the 1720s and 1740s, the sacristy was renovated in 1736 and the church interior in 1740. The Fürstenstuhl and the pulpit were repainted by the Lich-based church painter Daniel Hisgen in 1765, the organ in 1780. Between 1859 and 1861, the interior was drastically redesigned. The organ was transferred from the choir to the west gallery. The Fürstenstuhl had been located here, but it was now moved to the north wall, between the nave and the choir. The pulpit and altar were also moved. The present pulpit originally derives from the nearby Arnsburg Abbey. After secularisation, it was donated to Marienstiftskirche and moved there in 1859/60. The old pulpit dated to around 1600 and is now located in Hausen-Oes. In renovations between 1879 and 1881, the glass panes of the southern window and the south side of the slate roof were repaired. For Martin Luther's 400th birthday in 1883, a window on the east side of the church was donated. In 1930, the roof and organ were repaired.

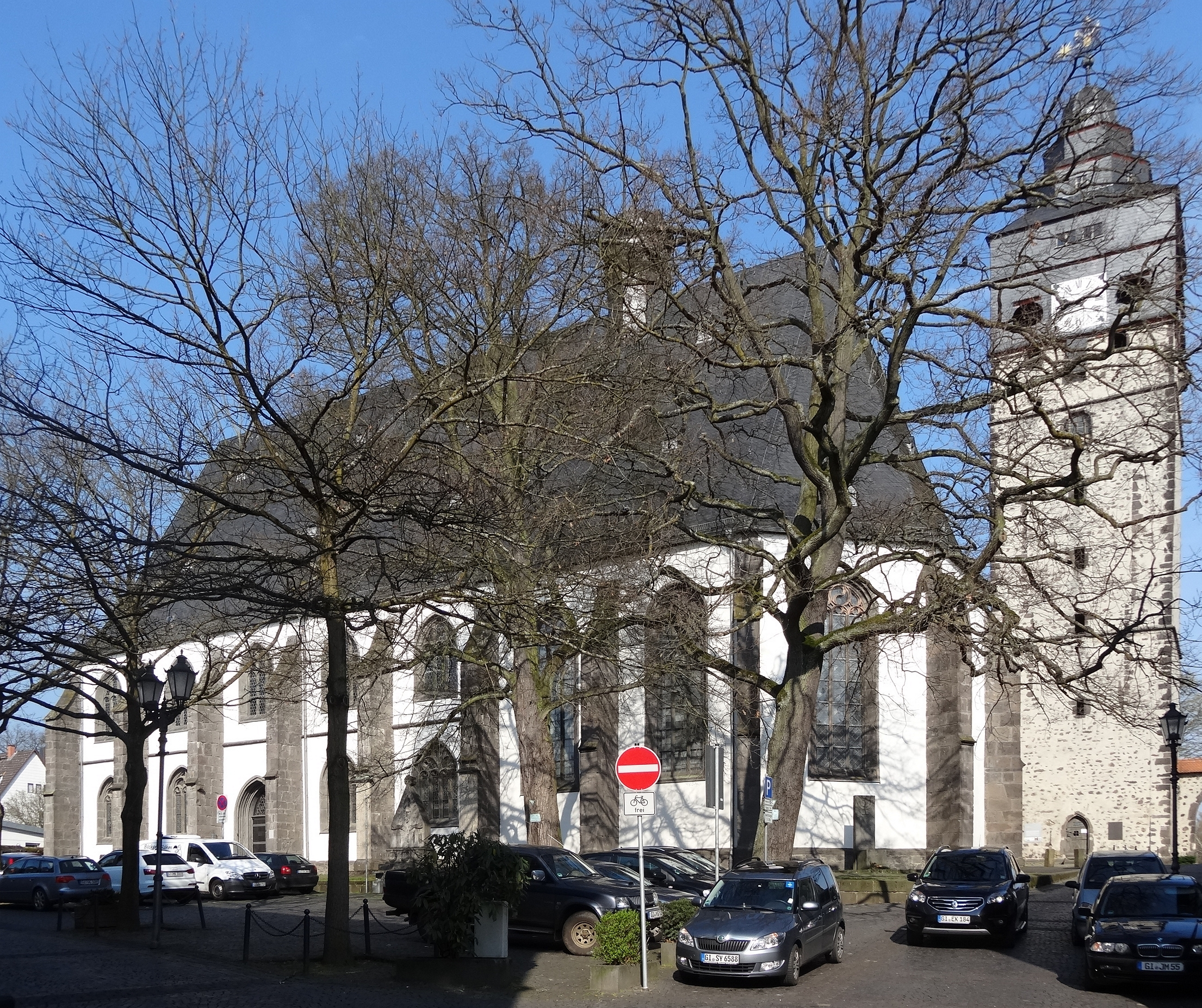
Marienstiftskirche and Stadtturm, behind the Lutherlinde (linden tree) and Stadteiche (oak)

During a renovation of the interior in 1952, Renaissance and Rococo paintings were revealed and the consecration crosses were restored. The church was most recently renovated between 2001 and 2002. In 2011 the church celebrated its 500th anniversary.

In 1883, for Martin Luther's 400th birthday, a linden tree was planted to the south of the church, which forms a recognised natural monument along with the oak tree beside it, which was planted in 1913 on the hundredth anniversary of the Battle of the Nations at Leipzig. Also on the south side of the church is a monument to those who died in the First World War. Southeast of the choir, a memorial to the Jews of Lich who were victims of National Socialism was erected in 1988.

== Architecture ==
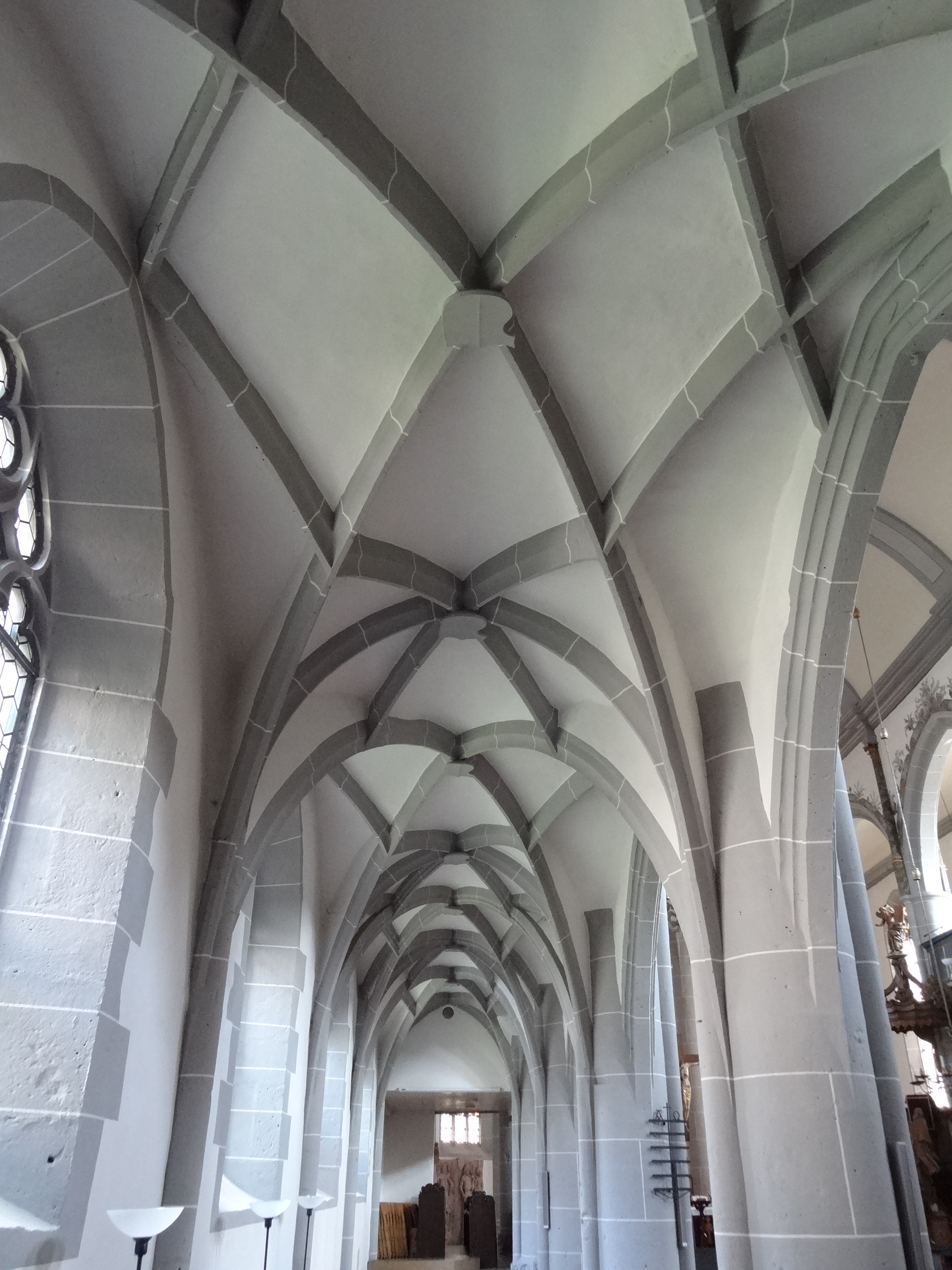
Vaulting in the side aisle

The Marienstiftskirche is a late Gothic hall church with three aisles and seven bays. It is not oriented exactly to the east, but slightly east-north-east on account of the city wall. There is no transept; the whole structure is in line with the choir space, which was originally separated off from the nave by a choir screen. The nave has a steeply pitched roof, which also covers the side aisles and is slightly hipped at the west end. The roof is dotted with small dormers and is crowned by a small, eight-sided flèche at the east end. The "Welsh canopy" topping the flèche dates to 1520, making it the oldest in Hesse. The choir is the same width as the nave. The sacristy was built on the north side of the choir under a cat-slide roof; it is now a chapel. The main building material was basalt, which is covered with white plaster. The buttresses, tracery, doors, pillars, arches, and vaults are made of grey Londorfer Basalt, except for the choir window tracery, where red sandstone was used instead.

The plaster-coated wooden barrel vaults in the central nave replaced a massive stone vault in 1555 or 1594. The Renaissance scrollwork (which was revealed in 1952) is cut off by a faux-marble wooden cornice, which supports the idea that the barrel were added as part of a renovation. This cornice rests on wooden columns with Corinthian capitals. Above the wooden barrel, the original ceiling beams are still in place. In the side aisles there is late gothic rib vaulting, which was probably originally intended to be installed in the central nave as well, but never added due to financial limitations. The narrow side-aisles allow access to the ambulatory, which is separated off by narrow, almost round arches, and in this way reflects a novel Renaissance influence. The galleries above the side aisles, which terminate at the choir and are accessed through three spiral staircases in the west wall, are supported by solid round columns. These columns extend up to the abutment of the main aisle's barrel vault, which forms a secondary arcade above the gallery. At the top of the eastern pillar on the southern side, indications of the original plan for rib vaulting in the central nave can be seen. The pillars of the choir also show signs of the planned rib vaulting. Under the altar there is a crypt, containing the bodily remains of the counts and their family.

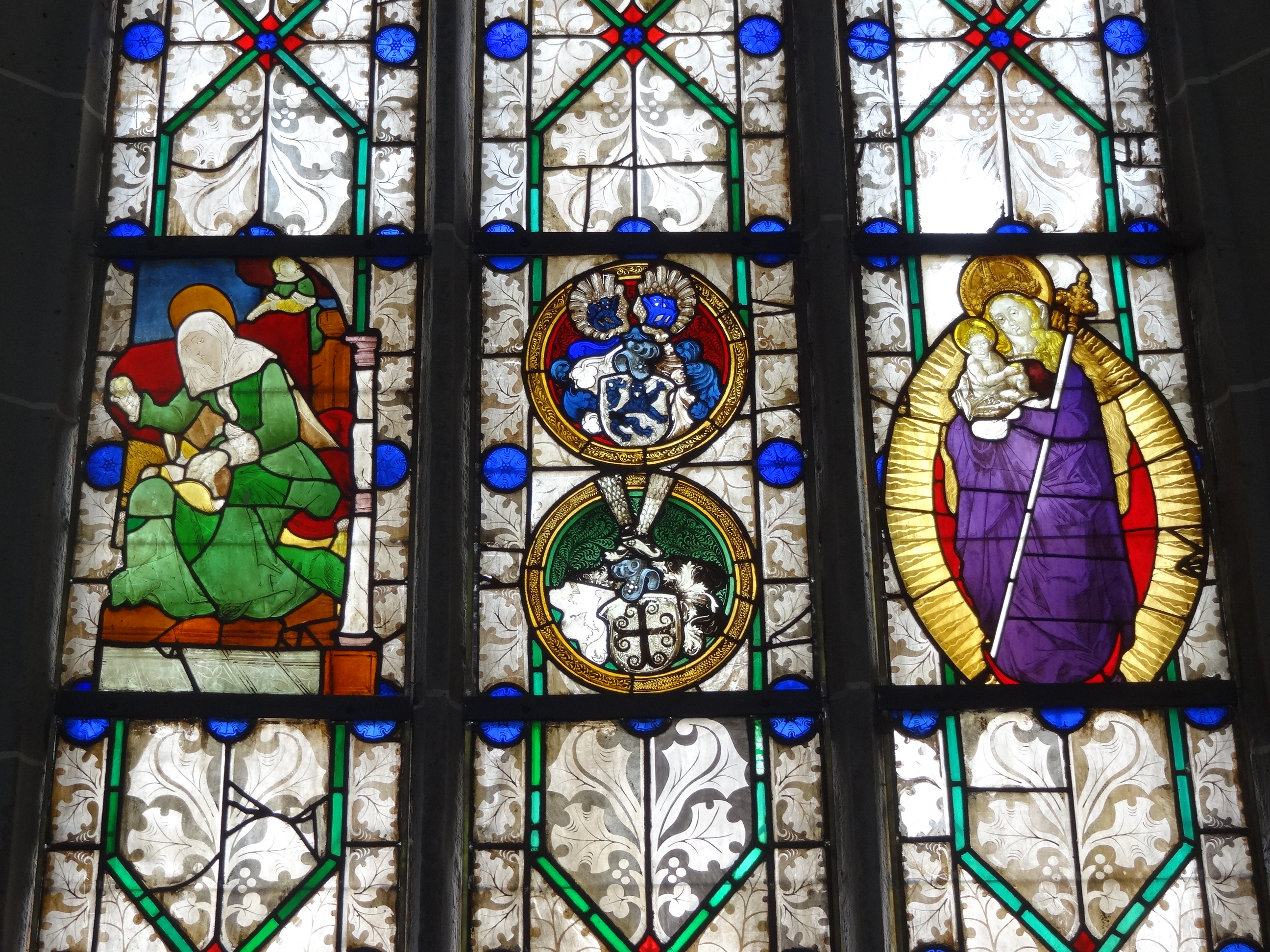
Stained glass windows depicting Elizabeth of Hungary (left), the coat of arms of Anna Schenk zu Schweinsberg (d. 1564), and Mary with the baby Jesus in the aureola (right)

The nave is lit by two levels of windows with pointed arches in the side galleries, which are separated by a cornice. The choir has five large windows with pointed arches. In the northeastern choir window are the remains of the old stained glass windows, which include a depiction of Mary with Child in the aureole from the previous church and one of Elizabeth of Hungary from the date of the present church's original construction, flanking depictions of the coats of arms of Wais von Fauerbach (above) and of Büches (below). The rest of the window paintings date to the nineteenth century. In the southern side aisle there are stained glass depictions of Martin Luther and Philip Melanchthon, as well as the risen Christ. At the west end there is a pointed arch window inserted high up in the wall.

The church is entered through two pointed-arch doorways: the sumptuous main door on the south side and the smaller, plainer west portal. The door frame is grooved and decorated with ribbing and ivy leaves. It was once thought that the south door was part of the previous church which had been incorporated into the present structure, but this has now been refuted. The two spiral staircases in the west corners of the church are entered from the inside of building through pointed-arches. The central staircase, which leads to the Fürstenstuhl, is also accessible from outside the building.

== Furnishings ==
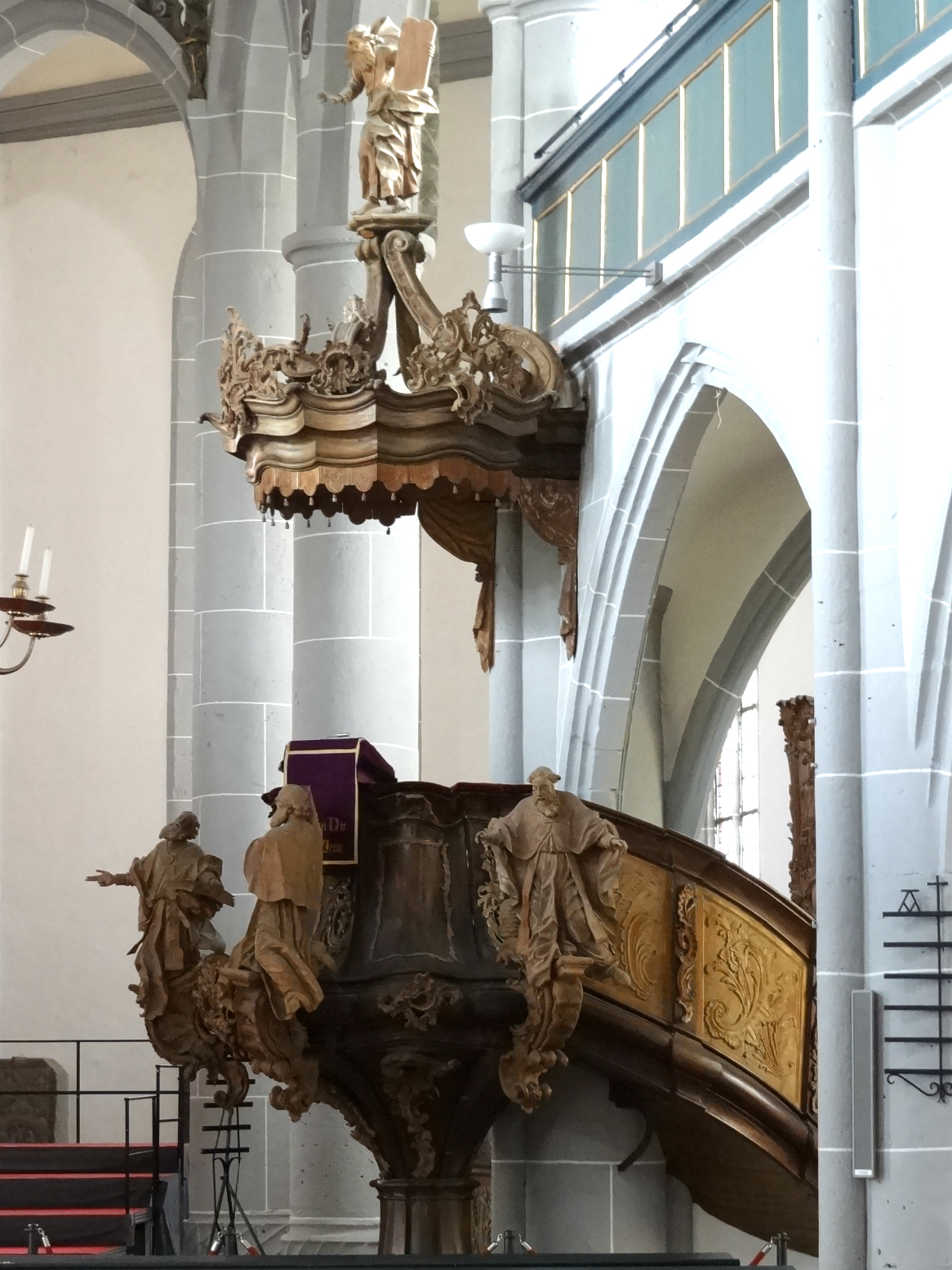
Pulpit from 1774

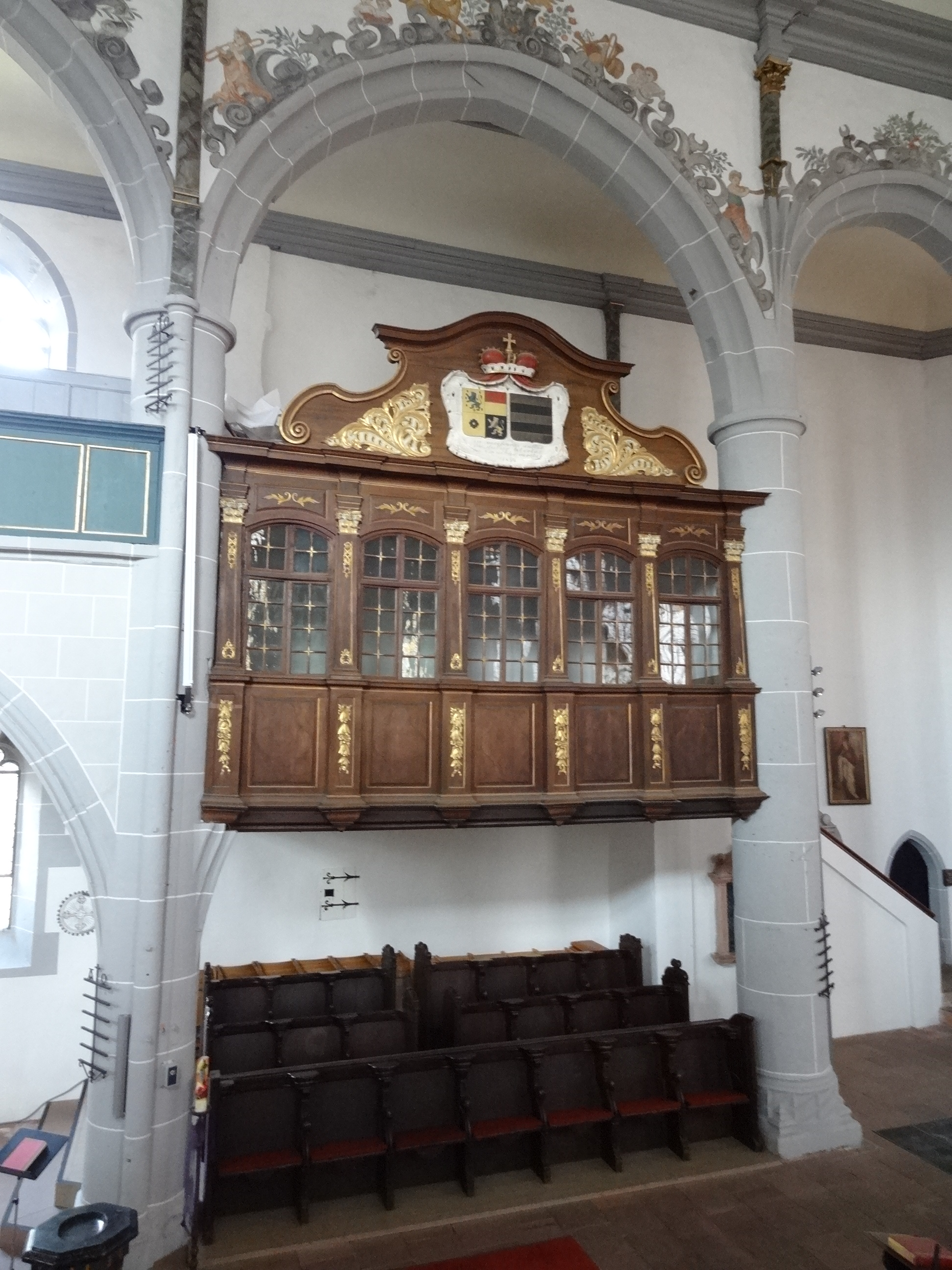
Fürstenstuhl (1714) and choir stalls (c.1530)

The baroque pulpit was made by the carpenters Diez von Engelthal and Seitz in 1767–1774. It is made in the shape of a eucharist chalice and has five concave sides. The large sculpted figures on the pulpit were made by Franz Martin Lutz of Rockenberg. They depict the four Doctors of the Church, Bernard of Clairvaux, Thomas Aquinas, Bonaventure and Pope Leo I. On top of the richly decorated canopy is a statue of Moses with the Ten Commandments. A dove symbolises the Holy Spirit. The wooden back wall, which once connected the pulpit and the canopy now hangs in the southwestern ambulatory. The connected Neo-Gothic Pfarrstuhl dates from the middle of the nineteenth century. The matching altar and the baptismal font are made out of white-veined, grey-black Lahn marble. The massive altar table rests on a curly support.

The tabernacle at the entrance to the Fürstenstuhl dates to 1536 and is the only Renaissance-style tabernacle in Hesse. It is closed with a wrought-iron grating, framed by pilasters and topped by a curved roof. Shallow reliefs depict scenes from the Old Testament. The gable bears the Latin inscription "ECCE PANIS ANGELORUM" (Behold, the bread of the angels!).

The life-sized, late Gothic, wooden crucifix of the three-nail type is located nearby, above the altar and it dates from 1511. It was probably made for the current church during its construction. It was repainted in the 17th century and its original colour scheme cannot be reconstructed.

The self-contained Fürstenstuhl for the church's noble patrons, the Princes of Solms-Hohensolms-Lich, is located opposite of the pulpit. It was built in 1714 and re-located to its present site in 1859. It is a closed lodge with five windows between wooden pilasters and arches and bears a label reading "1714" and a coat of arms from 1859. The church pews in the nave date to 1705. Below the Fürstenstuhl are the remaining early Renaissance choir pews, which were made in 1530 and were originally arrayed on both sides of the choir between the columns. Behind the door of the doorway to the south gallery is a wooden board which served as a Henkerssitz, the special seat for the town executioner. This was meant to enable him to participate in the service although he was unclean.

The decorative paintings come rom two different periods: the Renaissance (1594) and the Rococo (1740). The Renaissance paintings are located in the choir and the arcades of the two side-aisles, while the Rococo paintings are located on the west arcade and the wooden ceiling. Several consecration crosses survive on the walls. Four oil paintings hang near the entrance to the Fürstenstuhl (previously they were in the south side-aisle), which show St.s Catharine, Dorothea, Barbara, and Margaret on one side and male, largely destroyed figures on the other side. These were probably part of a winged altar from Arnsberg Abbey. The eight-armed bronze chandelier was cast in 1600.

== Organ ==
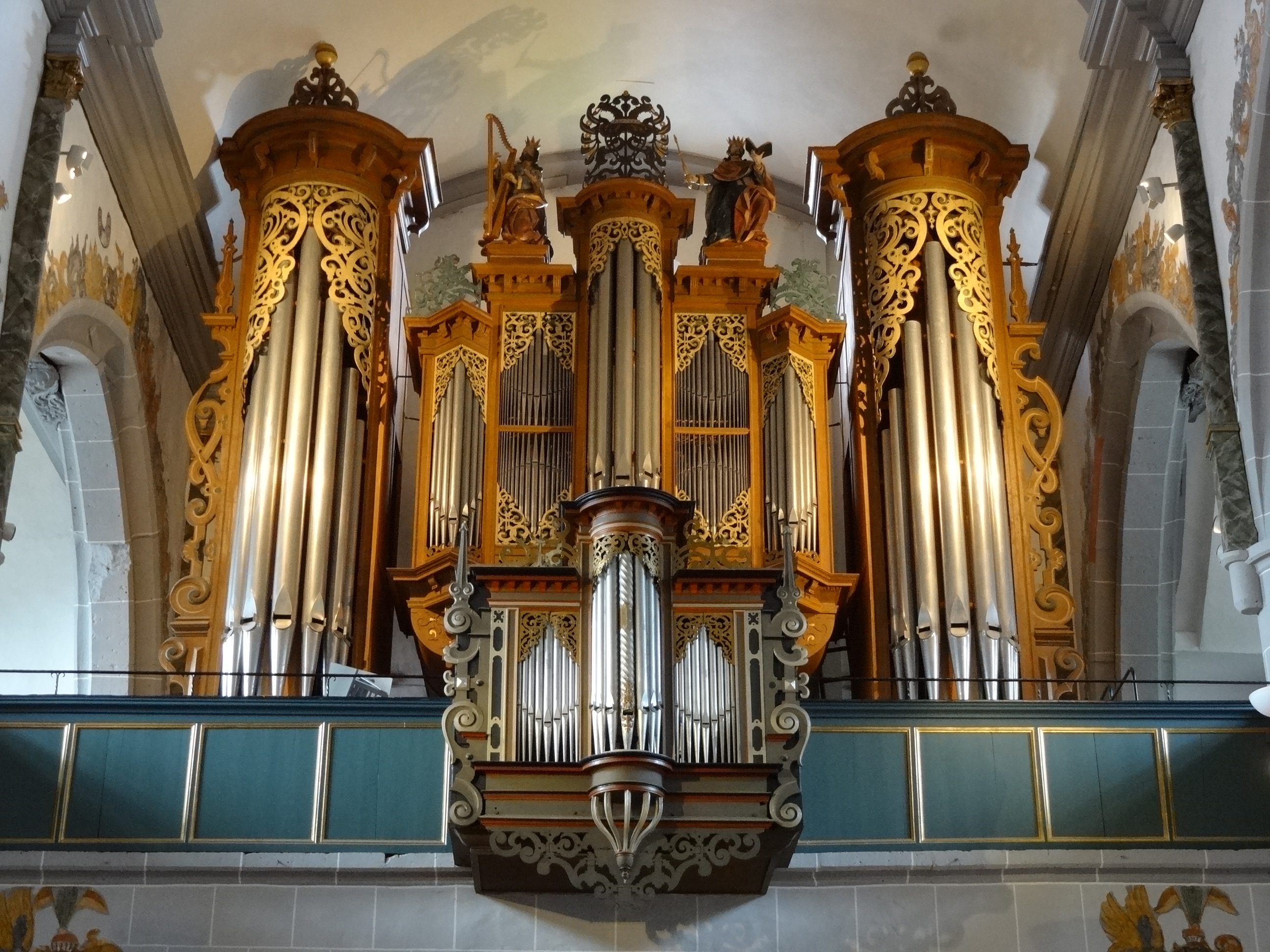
Organ exterior from 1624

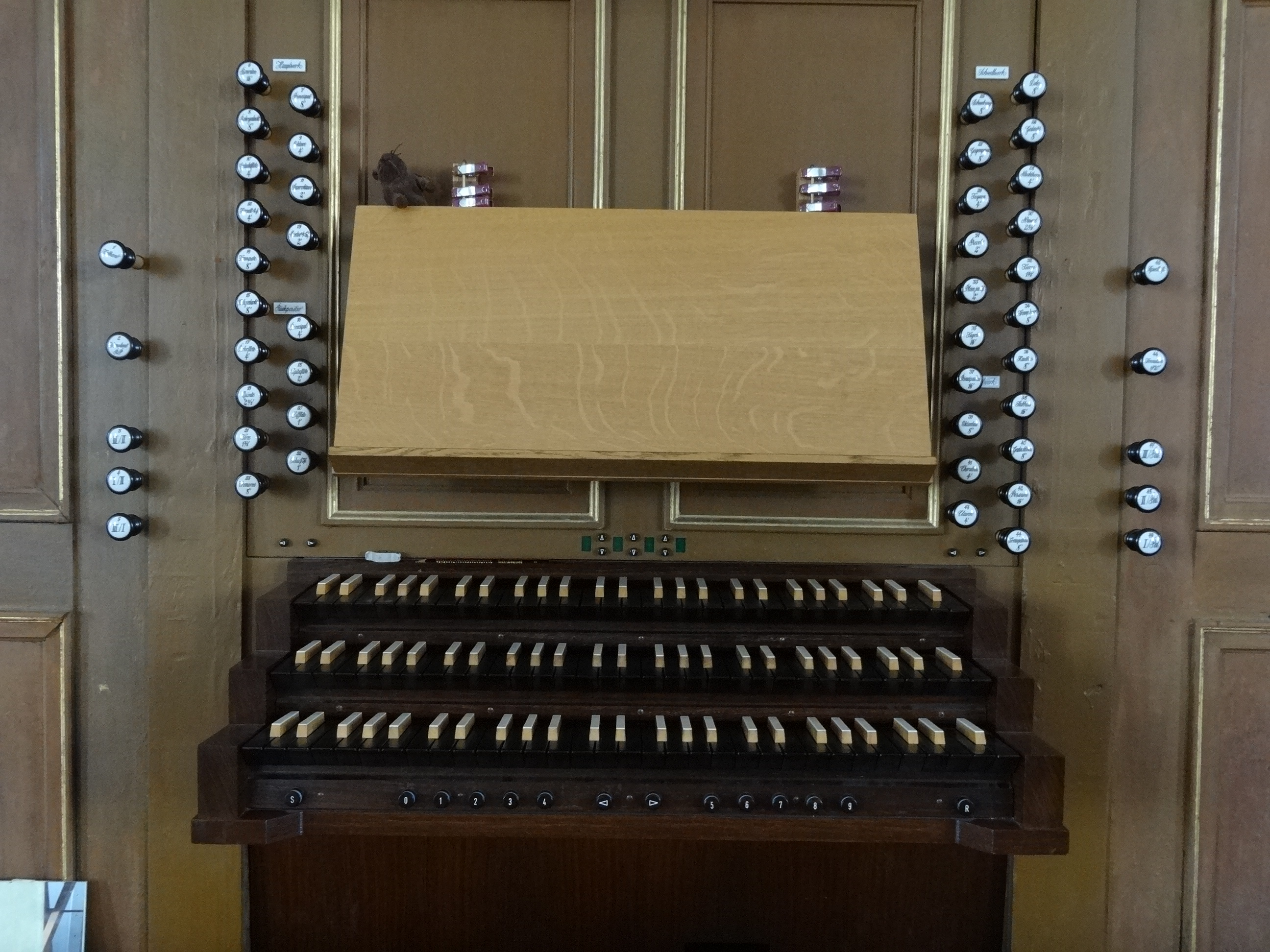
Console of the Organ

The organ was built during the Thirty Years' War between 1621 and 1624 by the organ-builder Georg Wagner of Lich and had around 20 registers with two manuals and a pedalboard, as well as wing doors on the sides. The instrument was originally located where the Fürstenstuhl now stands. Between 1631 and 1633, the organ was expanded with the two pedal towers of the organ of Arnsburg Abbey which was probably also built by Wagner around 1607. These were brought to Lich to protect them from being plundered by Swedish troops. The Lich-based organ firm, Förster & Nicolaus Orgelbau relocated the organ in 1861 from the small gallery in the ambulatory to the west gallery and modified its tuning. The instrument was modified repeatedly by the firm over time. In 1913, a substantial renovation took place in the course of which the organ received tubular-pneumatic action, cone chests, a free-standing console, an expression pedal and several new registers. A further rearrangement followed in 1941 in the course of the organ reform movement. In 1961, the empty rear housing was refilled with new registers in a slider chest. A new organ with mechanical tracker action was installed in the old housing, incorporating the old registers, in 1972. Finally, further tunings were added in 2002, so that the modern instrument contains over 39 registers and can adequately reproduce a broad range of styles.

Wagner's historic casing and five of his registers survive, as well as two nineteenth century registers and seven registers from 1913. The main casing is divided into five parts. The raised round tower in the middle is crowned by the Habsburg double eagle, flanked by figures of King David and Solomon. On both sides of the central tower there are two-level flat fields of pipes. These are flanked by shorter towers which are topped with the heraldic lions of Solms. The lower part of the housing is much smaller; its sides are decorated with a complicated pattern of corbels. The pedal towers on either side of the main organ stand on 19th century pedestals and loom over the main organ work. The pipes are covered by wooden veil boards, which differ somewhat from their analogues on the main casing. The three-part rear housing with a round central tower is located on a ledge relatively distant from its console.

== Bells ==
Marienstiftskirche has a peal of five bells. The two smallest are located in the flèche. The larger three hang in the Stadtturm, which was part of the town's fortifications. The bells are located on the bell-floor under the floor for the sentries, who were also responsible for ringing the bells. All of the bells are Medieval, except for the Baroque Eleven o'clock bell. The largest bell is cast with the deep curve typical of the Medieval period; the Eleven o'clock bell appears larger due to the much shallower curve which is typical of the Baroque, but it is actually smaller.

No.	Name (Funktion)	Year	Caster, place	Diameter (mm)	Height (mm)	Strike tone (ST-^{1}/_{16})	Tower	Inscription	Image
1	Anna, Festglocke	1400	unbekannt	1,380	1,180	f^{1}	Stadtturm	+ anno · domini · m° cccc° · anna + me · fvndi · ivssit · philippvs · nobilis · hic · sit + falckensteyn totvs · regim[ine] · tvnc b[e]n[e] · notvs + ("In the year of our Lord, 1400, Anna. Philip had me cast - may he always be famous. Falkenstein, then entirely well-known for his governance"); Alongside this, in relief, is Christ's head in a nimbus, the bust of a bishop, a crucifix with cloverleaf endings and a bishop giving a blessing	
2	Maria, Eleven o'clock bell	1517	Nikolaus von Lothringen	1,230	910	ges^{1}	Stadtturm	· 1 · 5 · 1 · 7 · hoc | opus | effusum | est | magna | cum | laude | decorum | virginis | ac | matris | regnantis | cuncta | per | euum | ni | v | loth· (1517. This work was cast with great praise for the virtues of the virgin mother who reigns over everything for eternity, Ni. of Loth.); HOC SIGNVM MAGNI REGIS EST (This is the sign of the Great King), with an engraved cross.	
3	Fire bell	1755	Johann Peter Bach, Windecken	1,050	780	g^{1}	Stadtturm	ANNO 1755; REGENTE ILUSTRISSIMO COMITE AC DOMINO; DOMINO CAROLO COMITE IN SOLMS LICH ETT; CIVITATIS LICHENSIS PRAEFECT[us] G P ROTH; CONSUL[es] I P HIZEL ET P I SCWENCK HOC[c]E; AES CASU QUODAM RIMAS PASSUM DE NOVA CONF<I>LATUM; PRISTINO RESTITUERE CLANGORI; IN GOTTES NAHMEN FLOSS ICH JOHAN PETER BACH; IN WINDECKEN GOSS MICH 1755 ("AD 1755, when the illustrious count and lord, Lord Charles, count of Solms-Lich etc. reigned, the prefect of the city of Lich, G.P. Roth, and the consuls, I.P. Hizel, and P.I. Schwenck, restored this bronze [bell] after it had been cracked in an accident, having it melted down and cast anew, with a pristine peal. In God's name, I, Johan Peter Bach cast (it), in Windecken he cast me, 1755	
4	Our Father bell	1453	unknown	720	600	d^{2}	Flèche	| Anno · d[o]m[ini] · m° cccc° liii° · Johan · brus · Tonitruum · rumpo · mortuum · defleo · sacreilegum · voco | (In the year of our Lord, 1453, Johan Brus. I launch thunder. I mourn the dead. I call the wicked.) iohan · laszen · bis · bau · meister · (Johan Laszenbis, Builder)	
5			unknown	350	260		Flèche		

== Parish ==
The parish of Marienstiftskirche contains roughly 4,200 members and is part of the decanate of Gießen in the Propstei of Upper Hesse in the Protestant Church in Hesse and Nassau. It is supervised by two priests and is linked with the independent parish of Nieder-Bessingen. There is a church hall in the immediate proximity of the Marienstiftskirche for parish and regional events. Local ecumenical events and church music form the focus of the parish's activities. The Marienstift cantors, the project-choir "Camerata Vocale Hessen," children's and youths' choirs and the brassband shape parish life. Since 2001, the full-time choir-master and organist, Christof Becker, has co-ordinated the musical schedule and has organised regular organ vespers and concert series, such as BarockFestLich.

== Bibliography ==
- Otto Alt: Evangelische Marienstiftskirche Lich. (= Kleine Kunstführer; 666). 3rd edition. Schnell & Steiner, Regensburg 2011, ISBN 978-3-7954-6896-5.
- Georg Dehio: Handbuch der Deutschen Kunstdenkmäler, Hessen I: Regierungsbezirke Gießen und Kassel. Edited by Folkhard Cremer, Tobias Michael Wolf and others. Deutscher Kunstverlag, München / Berlin 2008, ISBN 978-3-422-03092-3, pp. 558–560.
- Wilhelm Diehl: Baubuch für die evangelischen Pfarreien der Souveränitätslande und der acquirierten Gebiete Darmstadts. (= Hassia sacra; 8). Self-published, Darmstadt 1935, pp. 200–204.
- Waldemar Küther: Das Marienstift Lich im Mittelalter. Selbstverlag, Marburg 1977.
- Karlheinz Lang: "Kirchenplatz 13 und 17. Ehem. Marienstiftskirche heute Ev. Pfarrkirche." In: Landesamt für Denkmalpflege Hessen (ed.) Kulturdenkmäler in Hessen. Landkreis Gießen I. Hungen, Laubach, Lich, Reiskirchen. (= Denkmaltopographie Bundesrepublik Deutschland). Theiss, Stuttgart 2008, ISBN 978-3-8062-2177-0, pp. 401–404.
- Magistrat der Stadt Lich (ed.), Paul Görlich (ed.): Licher Heimatbuch. Die Kernstadt und ihre Stadtteile. Self-Published, Lich 1989.
- Heinrich Walbe: Die Kunstdenkmäler des Kreises Gießen. Bd. 3. Südlicher Teil. Hessisches Denkmalarchiv, Darmstadt 1933, pp. 242–284.
- Peter Weyrauch: Die Kirchen des Altkreises Gießen. Mittelhessische Druck- und Verlagsgesellschaft, Gießen 1979, pp. 118 f.
