= Elspe (Volme) =

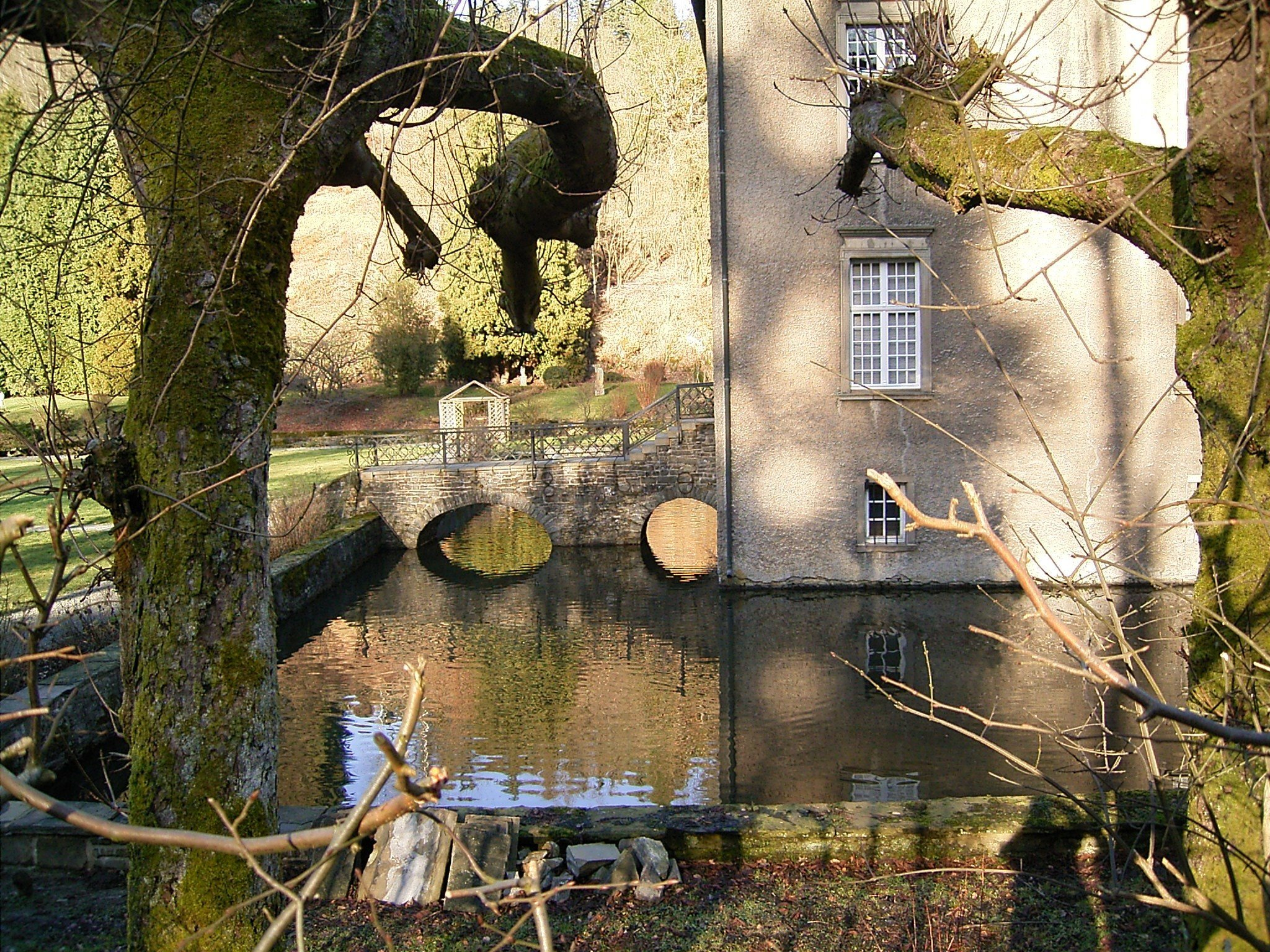
- The water of the Neuenhof moated castle is supplied by the Elspe

Location
- Country: Germany
- State: North Rhine-Westphalia

Physical characteristics
- Source
  - coordinates: 51°11′48″N 7°39′48″E
- Mouth
  - location: Volme
  - coordinates: 51°12′20″N 7°34′55″E
- Length: 7.5 km (4.7 mi)

Basin features
- Progression: Volme→ Ruhr→ Rhine→ North Sea

Elspe is a right tributary of the Volme river in Germany. Its source is at 413 metres above sea-level near Brenscheid, just south of Piepersloh, a part of the city Lüdenscheid. It empties at 270 metres above sea-level into the Volme in Brügge, another part of Lüdenscheid. The Elspe is separated from the Lüdenscheid's built up area by the Nurre mountain range. It makes two 90° turns.

Notable buildings in the Elspe valley are Schloß Neuenhof (Neuenhof Castle) and the Elspe works of the Hueck continuous aluminium casting factory.
