= Martin Glaum =

Martin Glaum (born 1962) is a German economist and author and has held the Otto Beisheim Endowed Chair of International Accounting at the WHU – Otto Beisheim School of Management since 2014. Before this he held the Chair of International Management, Accounting and Auditing at the University of Giessen in Giessen, Germany. Until 1999 he was a Professor of International Management at the Viadrina European University in Frankfurt (Oder). He was born in Wetzlar, Germany.

== Guest professorships ==
Glaum is a regular lecturer at international seminars and has also been visiting professor at the following universities:

- DePaul University, Chicago (1998)
- University of Michigan, Ann Arbor (1999)
- Universität St. Gallen (2003)
- University of Glasgow (2007)
- London School of Economics (2008)

== Memberships ==
Glaum is a member of the board and treasurer of the German Association of University Lecturers of Business Administration (Verbands der Hochschullehrer für Betriebswirtschaft e.V.). He is the Chairman of the Working Group "Financial Instruments" at the German Accounting Standards Committee, (Deutschen Rechnungslegungs Standards Committee - DRSC). He is the Academic Director of the Working Circle entitled "Corporate Development and International Management" at the Schmalenbach Society of for Business Administration (Schmalenbach-Gesellschaft für Betriebswirtschaft e.V.), and a member of the Scientific Committee of the European Accounting Association and member of the Board of Trustees of the Esche Schümann Commichau Trust (Esche Schümann Commichau Stiftung).

== Research focus ==
- International Accounting
- International Financial Management
- Risk Management
- Mergers & Acquisitions

== Selected publications ==
- Glaum, Martin; Wyrwa, Sven: Making acquisitions transparent : goodwill accounting in times of crises, Frankfurt, M.: Fachverl. Moderne Wirtschaft, 2011, ISBN 978-3-934803-49-7
- Glaum, Martin; “Goodwill impairment: The effects of public enforcement and monitoring by institutional investors” (with W. Landsmann, S. Wyrwa)
- Glaum, Martin; The Accounting Review. “Discretionary accounting choices: The case of IAS 19 pension accounting” (with T. Keller, D. Street), in: Accounting and Business Research, Vol. 48, No. 2, 2018, pp. 139–170.
- Glaum, Martin; “Lexicographic preferences for predictive modeling of human decision making: A new machine learning method with an application in accounting” (with M. Bräuning, E. Hüllermeier, T. Keller), in: European Journal of Operations Research, Vol. 258, 2017, 295 – 306.
- Glaum, Martin; *Compliance with IFRS 3 and IAS 36 required disclosures across 17 European countries: Company-level and country-level determinants (with P. Schmidt, D. Street, S. Vogel), in: Accounting and Business Research, Vol. 43, No. 3, 2013, pp. 163–204.
- Glaum, Martin; “Introduction of international accounting standards, disclosure quality and accuracy of analysts’ earnings forecasts” (with J. Baetge, A. Grothe, T. Oberdörster), in: European Accounting Review, Vol. 22, No. 1, 2013, pp. 79–116.
- Glaum, Martin; “Hedge accounting and its influence on financial hedging: When the tail wags the dog” (with A. Klöcker), in: Accounting and Business Research, Vol. 41, No. 5, 2011, pp. 459–489.
- Glaum, Martin; “Pension accounting and research: A review”, in: Accounting and Business Research, Vol. 39, No. 3, 2009, pp. 273–311.
- Glaum, Martin; “The extent of threshold-oriented earnings management in the US and Germany” (with K. Lichtblau, J. Lindemann), in: Journal of International Accounting Research, Vol. 3, No. 2, 2004, pp. 45 – 77.
- Glaum, Martin; “Compliance with the disclosure requirements of Germany’s New Market: IAS versus US GAAP” (with mit D. Street), in: Journal of International Financial Management and Accounting, Vol. 14, No. 1, 2003, pp. 64 – 100.
- Glaum, Martin; “Crossing borders in international business education: German and Polish students at the European University Viadrina” (with B. Rinker), in: Management International Review, Vol. 42, No. 3, 2002, pp. 327 – 345.
- Glaum, Martin; “The DAX and the Dollar: The economic exposure of German corporations” (with M. Brunner, H. Himmel), in: Journal of International Business Studies, Vol. 31, No. 4, January 2001, pp. 715–724.
- Glaum, Martin; “German managers’ attitudes towards Anglo-American accounting - Results from an Empirical Study on Global Accounting Harmonization” (with U. Mandler), in: International Journal of Accounting, Vol. 32, No. 4/1997, pp. 459–481.
- Glaum, Martin; "The management of foreign exchange risk in UK multinationals: An empirical study" (with P. Belk), in: Accounting and Business Research, Vol. 21, No. 81, 1990, pp. 3–13.
- Glaum, Martin; “Strategic management of exchange rate risks”, in: Long Range Planning, Vol. 23, No. 4, 1990, S. 65 - 72.
