= Wetzlarer Kreuz =

Interchange in Wetzlar, Germany

Coordinates: 50°35′46″N 8°29′17″E

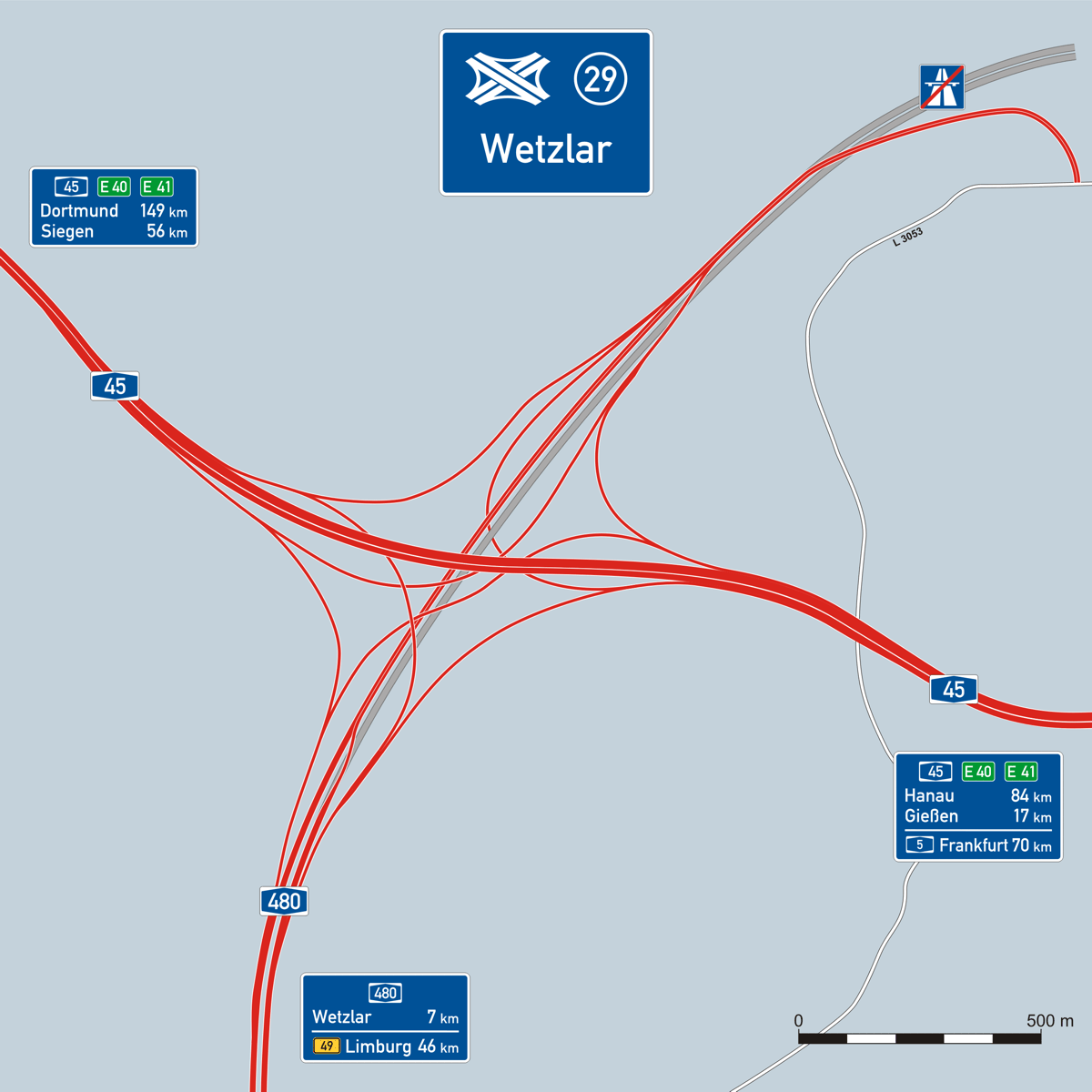
Wetzlarer Kreuz

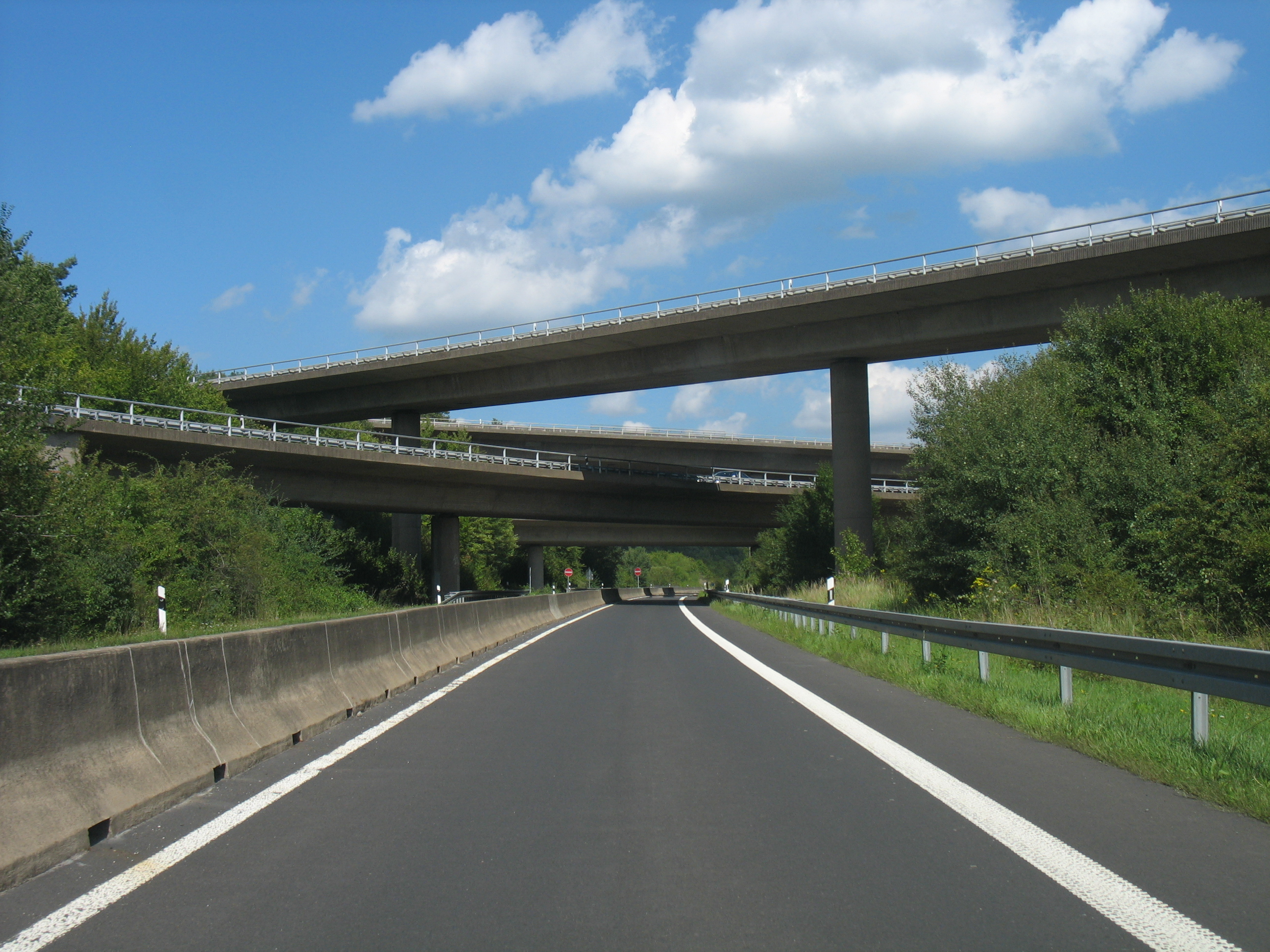
Wetzlarer Kreuz

The Wetzlarer Kreuz is an Autobahn interchange in the city of Wetzlar in Hesse, Germany where the highways A45 and A480 meet. This junction is a stack interchange, which is the only fully built stack interchange in Germany. An incomplete stack interchange also exists for the A3 and B55a junction.

== Manual traffic count near the interchange ==
The interchange is traveled daily by about 61,000 vehicles.

From	To	Daily traffic counts	Percentage heavy traffic
AS Ehringshausen (A 45)	Wetzlarer Kreuz	58,200	21.7 %
Wetzlarer Kreuz	AS Wetzlar-Ost (A 45)	51,900	21.1 %
AS Aßlar (A 480)	Wetzlarer Kreuz	8,700	12.8 %
Wetzlarer Kreuz	Autobahn end (A 480)	3,200	12.6 %
