= Herman Schmalenbach =

German philosopher

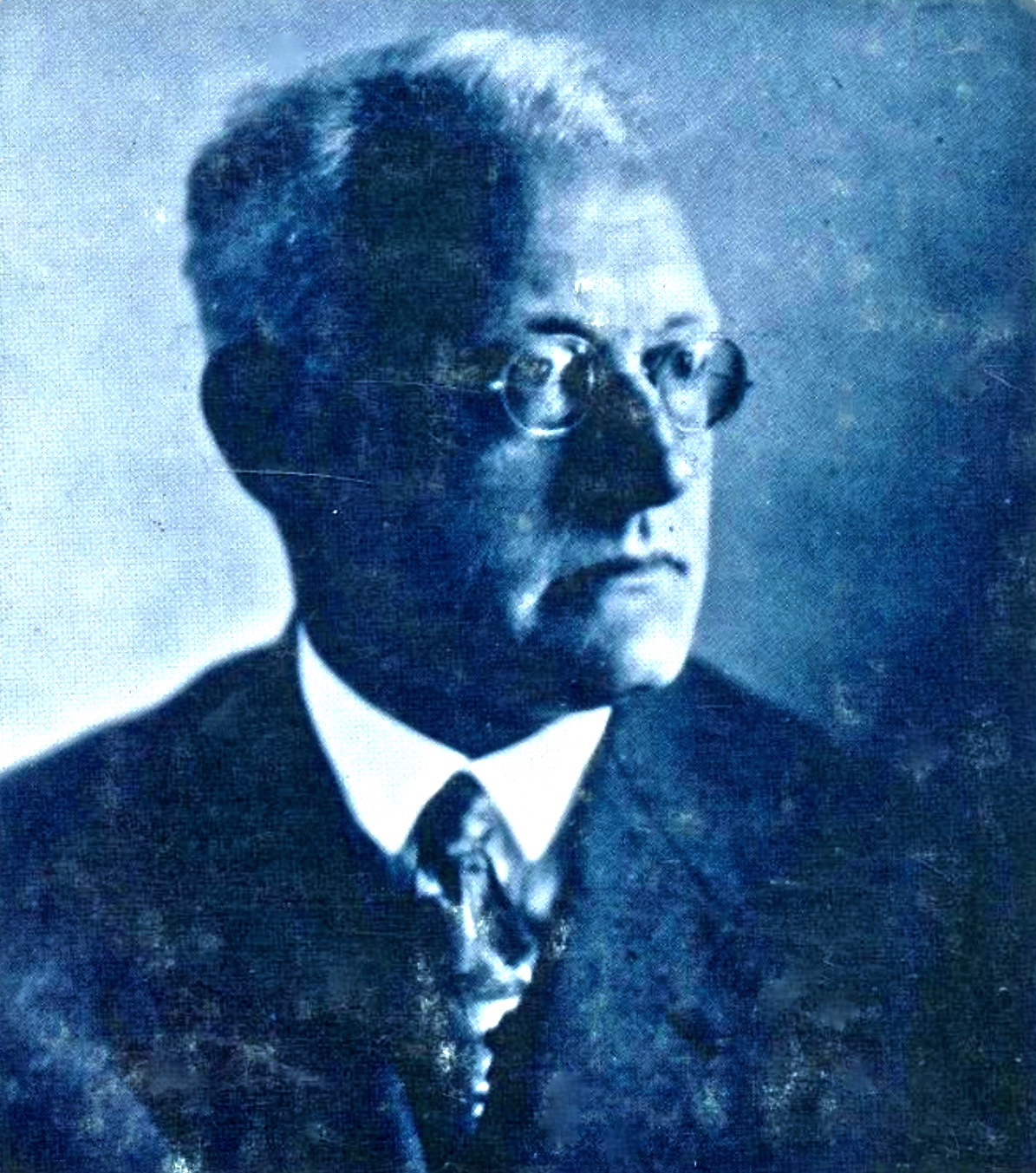
- Schmalenbach herman.png
- Born: 15 November 1885; Breckerfield
- Died: 3 November 1950 (aged 64)

Herman Schmalenbach (15 November 1885 – 3 November 1950) was a German philosopher who refined the concepts of Gemeinschaft and Bund.

== Biography ==
He was born on 15 November 1885 in Breckerfeld, Germany, his brother was Eugen Schmalenbach. He studied in Jena, Berlin and Munich, and he received his doctorate in 1910 at Jena. From 1916 to 1917 he taught at a reform school in Ilbeshausen-Hochwaldhausen. In Göttingen from 1920 to 1923 he was an associate professor. He also taught in 1928 at the Leibniz University Hannover. From 1931 he started at the University of Basel, founded and worked there until his death on 3 November 1950 in Basel, Switzerland.

His son was the art historian Werner Schmalenbach.
