= Bundesstraße 54 =

Federal highway in Germany

B 54
- Bundesstraße 54

Route information
- Length: 350 km (220 mi)

Location
- Country: Germany
- States: North Rhine-Westphalia, Rhineland Palatinate, Hesse

Highway system
- Roads in Germany; Autobahns; List; Federal; List; State; E-roads

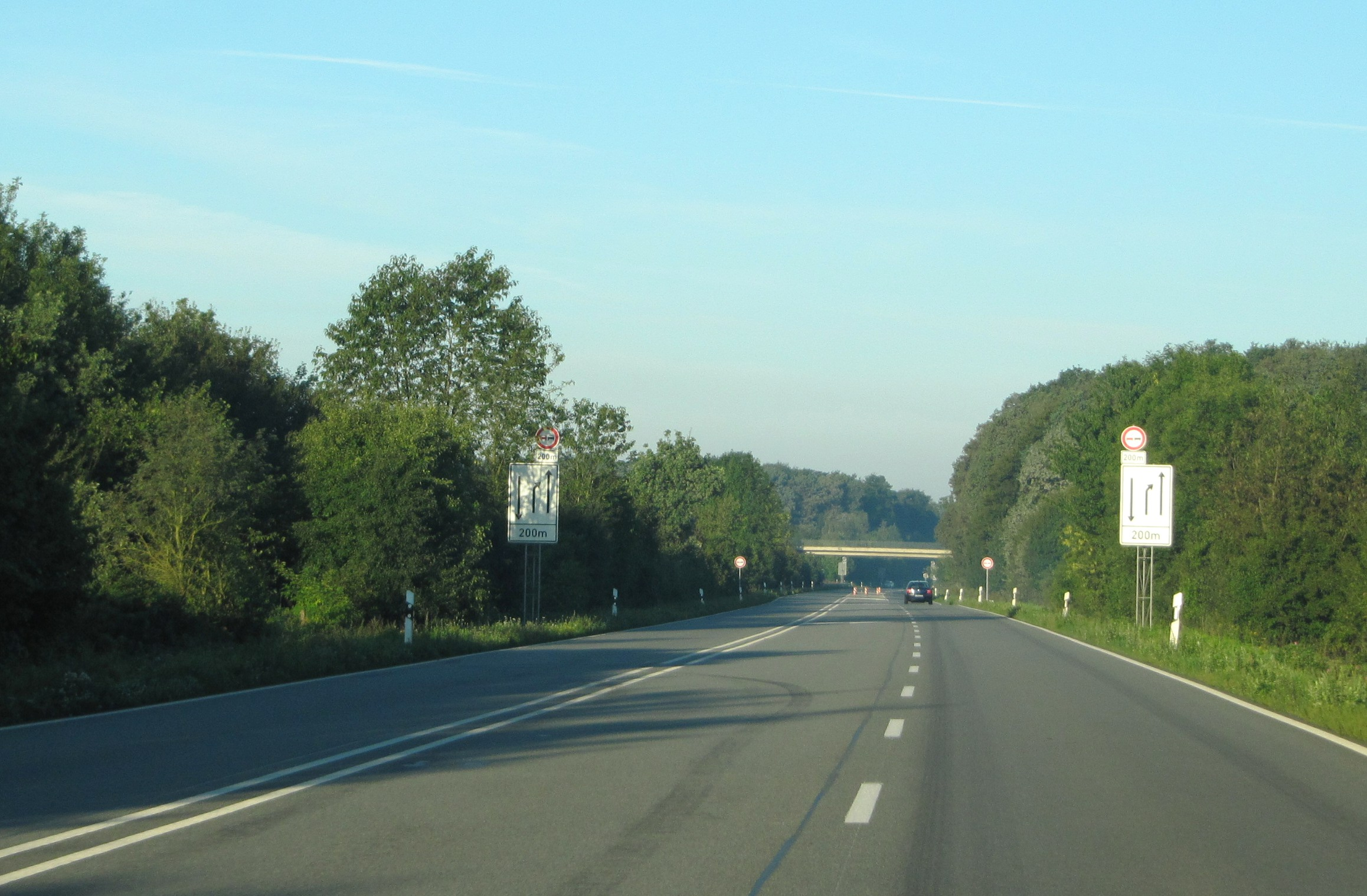
The B54 near the Dutch border towards Enschede

The Bundesstraße 54 or B54 is a German federal highway running in a north–south direction from the Dutch border near Gronau to the Hessian state capital Wiesbaden.

== See also ==
- Dortmund
