= Julia Glaum =

German and Norwegian materials scientist

Julia Glaum (born 1980) is a materials scientist whose research concerns the aging and fatigue of advanced functional materials with ferroelectric or piezoelectric properties, and the biomedical applications of these materials. Educated in Germany, she works in Norway as a professor in the Department of Materials Science and Engineering at the Norwegian University of Science and Technology (NTNU).

== Education and career ==
Glaum received a diploma in physics (the German equivalent of a master's degree) in 2006, at the University of Giessen. She completed a doctorate at the Technische Universität Darmstadt with a dissertation involving aging and fatigue in ferroelectric materials.

From 2012 to 2015 she worked as a postdoctoral researcher at the University of New South Wales in Australia. In 2015 she returned to Europe with the support of a European Commission Marie Skłodowska-Curie Fellowship, and became a faculty member at NTNU. She was promoted to associate professor in 2018 and to full professor in 2022.

== Recognition ==
Glaum is a member of the Norwegian Academy of Technological Sciences (NTVA).
