= Wiebelsaat =

River in Germany

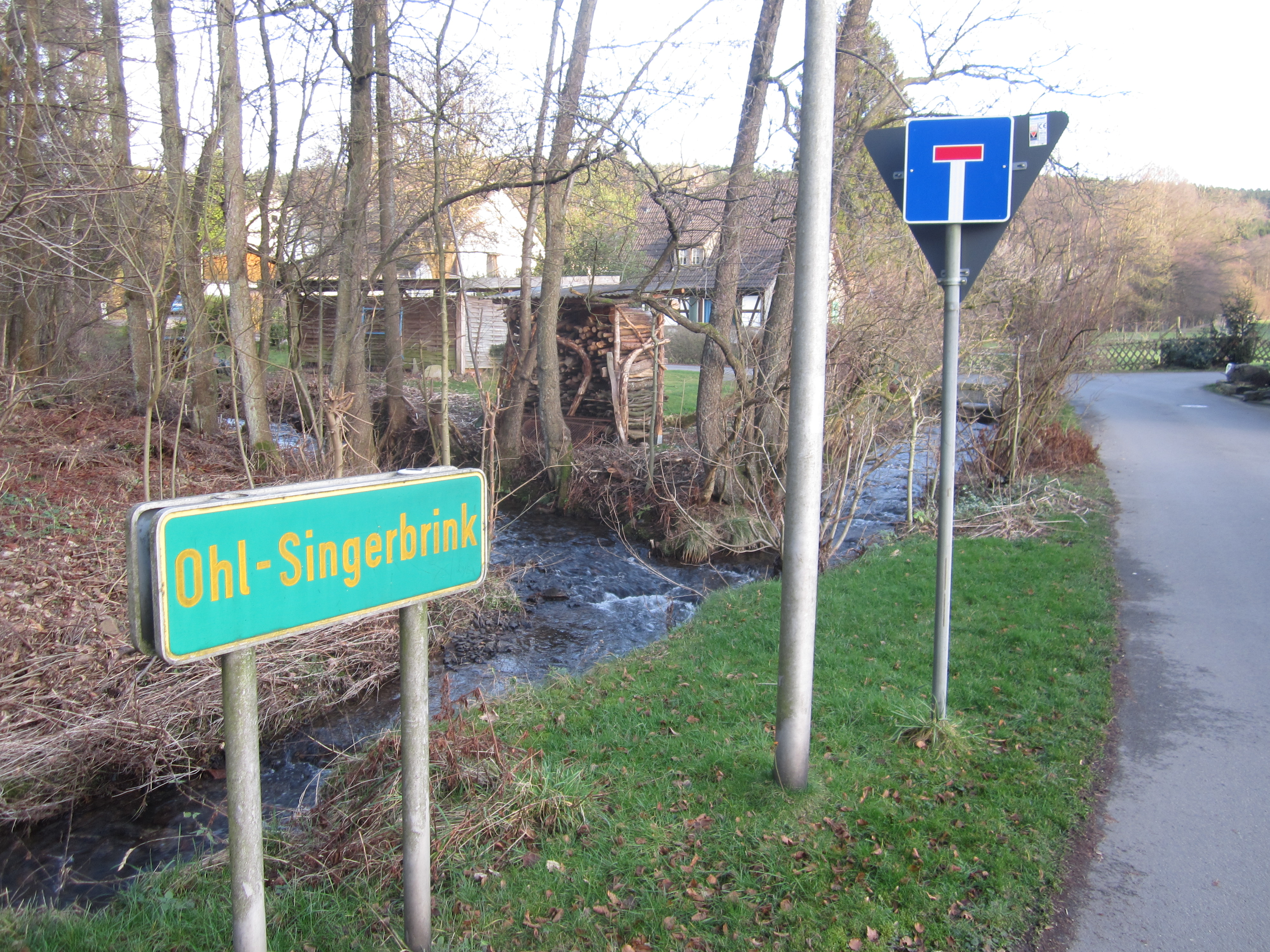

Location
- Country: Germany
- State: North Rhine-Westphalia

Physical characteristics
- Mouth
  - location: Volme
  - coordinates: 51.1244°N 7.6301°E

Basin features
- Progression: Volme→ Ruhr→ Rhine→ North Sea

Wiebelsaat is a river of North Rhine-Westphalia, Germany. It is 4.7 km (2.9 mi) long and flows into the Volme as a right tributary near Meinerzhagen.

== See also ==
- List of rivers of North Rhine-Westphalia
