= Eugen Schmalenbach =

German academic and economist

- Born: August 20, 1873; Halver
- Died: February 20, 1955 (aged 81); Cologne
- Education: Leipzig College of Commerce, 1898
- Occupation: Professor
- Employer: University of Cologne
- Organization: Schmalenbach Society
- Spouse: Marianne Sachs
- Children: 2
- Relatives: Herman Schmalenbach (brother)

Eugen Schmalenbach (20 August 1873 – 20 February 1955) was a German academic and economist. He was born in Halver, and attended the Leipzig College of Commerce starting in 1898. The college later became part of Leipzig University, only to emerge again as the Handelshochschule Leipzig.

Schmalenbach is best known as a professor at the University of Cologne, and as a contributor to German language journals on the subjects of economics, and the emerging fields of Business Management and financial accounting. He retired from active university life in 1933; one reason for this was to avoid attention, since his wife, Marianne Sachs, was Jewish. The couple had two children, Marian and Fritz. He died in Cologne in 1955.

He was the founder of the Schmalenbach Society to foster closer links between business economics research and industry; the organization remains active, having merged with another body in 1978.

Eugen Schmalenbach is sometimes confused with his brother, Herman Schmalenbach, a philosopher and sociologist known for his sociological concept of the bund, or communion, cf., Kevin Hetherington ('The Contemporary Significance of Schmalenbach's Concept of the Bund'), and Howard G. Schneiderman ('Herman Schmalenbach,' in The Encyclopedia of Community).
