= Münzenberg =

- Town
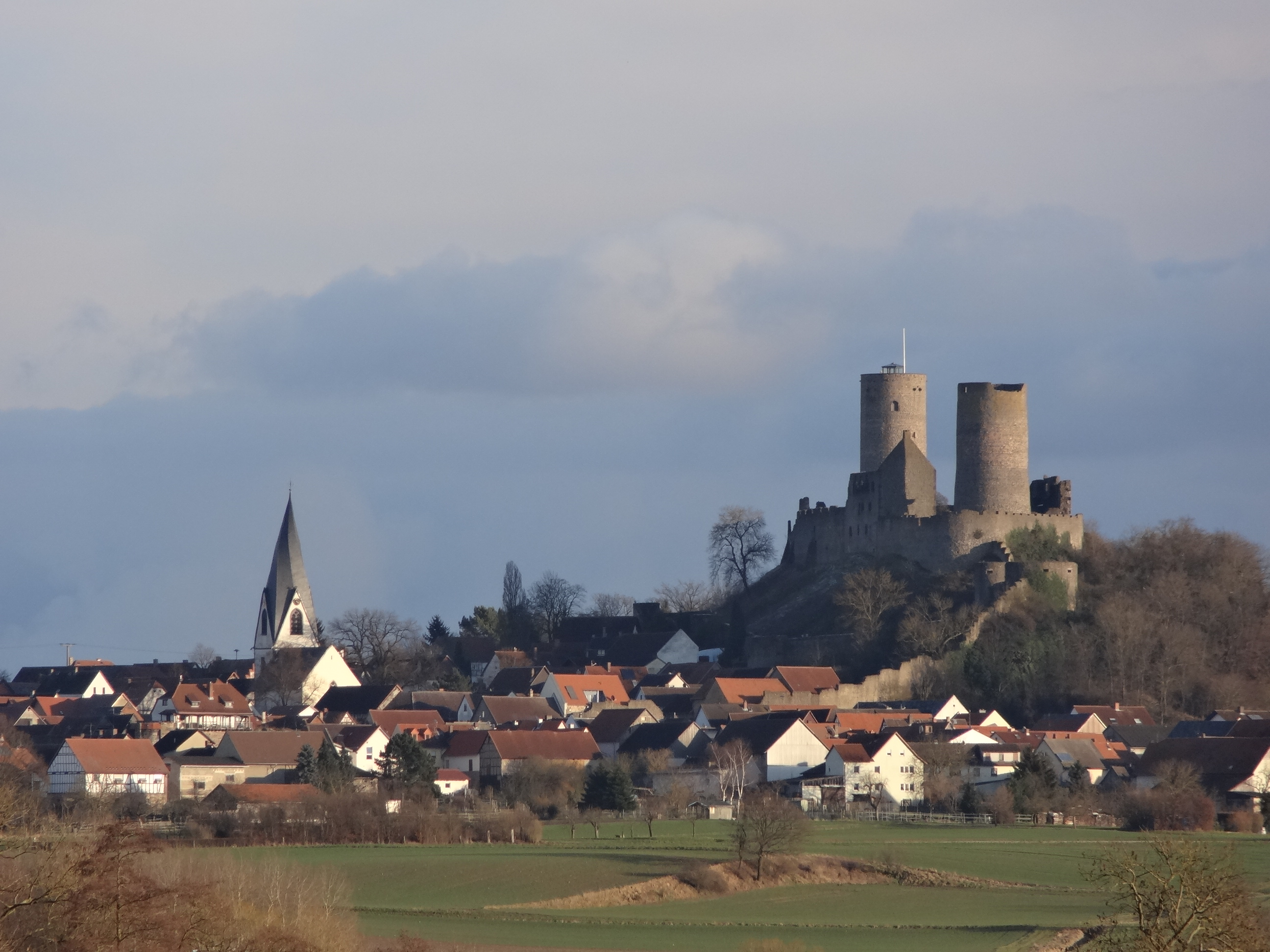
- View of Münzenberg

- Coat of arms

- Location of Münzenberg within Wetteraukreis district
- Interactive map of Münzenberg
- Location within Germany Location within Hesse
- Coordinates: 50°27′12″N 8°46′34″E
- Country: Germany
- State: Hesse
- Admin. region: Darmstadt
- District: Wetteraukreis
- Subdivisions: 4 districts

Government
  - Mayor (2023–29): Isabell Tammer (FW)

Area
  - Total: 31.63 km^{2} (12.21 sq mi)
- Elevation: 205 m (673 ft)

Population (2025-12-31)
  - Total: 5,662
  - Density: 179.0/km^{2} (463.6/sq mi)
- Time zone: UTC+01:00 (CET)
  - Summer (DST): UTC+02:00 (CEST)
- Postal codes: 35516
- Dialling codes: 06033/06004
- Vehicle registration: FB
- Website: www.muenzenberg.de

Münzenberg (German pronunciation: [ˈmʏntsn̩ˌbɛʁk]) is a town in the Wetteraukreis district in Hesse, Germany. It is located 13 km north of Friedberg, and 16 km southeast of Gießen. Münzenberg Castle is located outside the town.

== Population development ==
Year	1939	1961	1970	2002	2007	2011	2012	2015
Inhabitants	930	1245	1218	5646	5648	5611	5584	5596

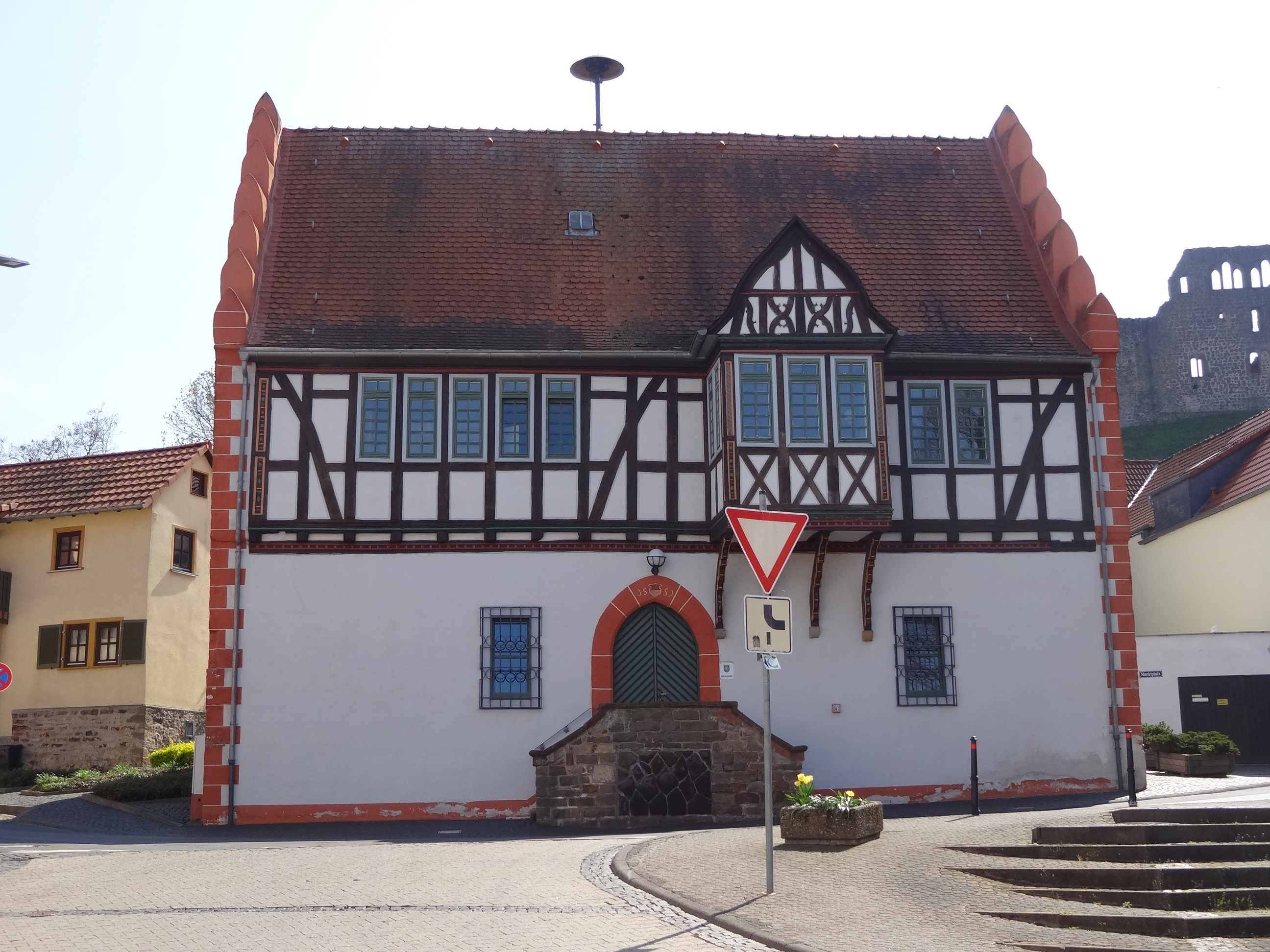
Market place

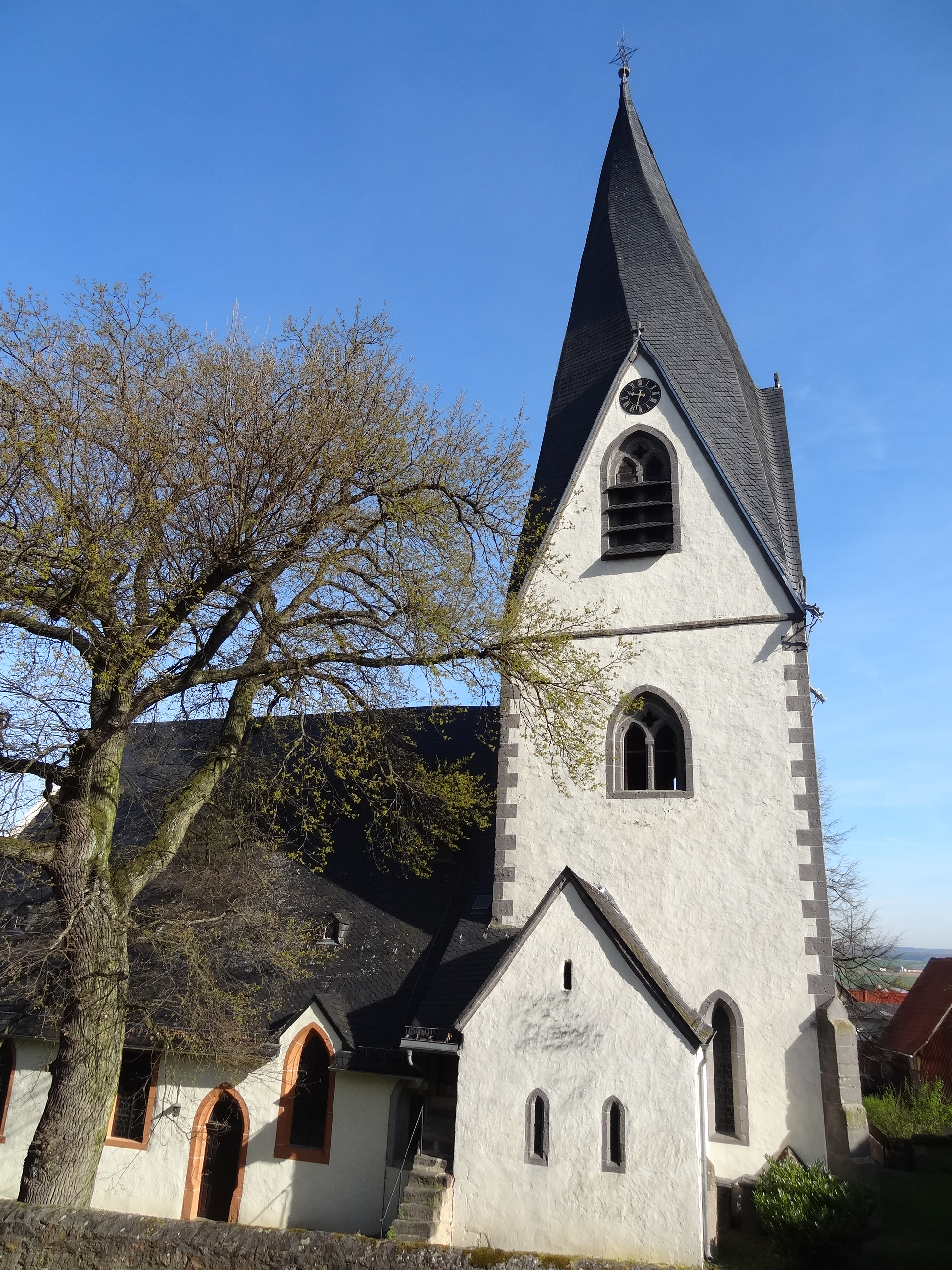
Protestant church

== Born in Münzenberg ==
- Theodor Morell (1886–1948), born in the district of Trais, physician, from 1936 to 1945 private physician of Adolf Hitler
