= Ennepe =

River in Germany

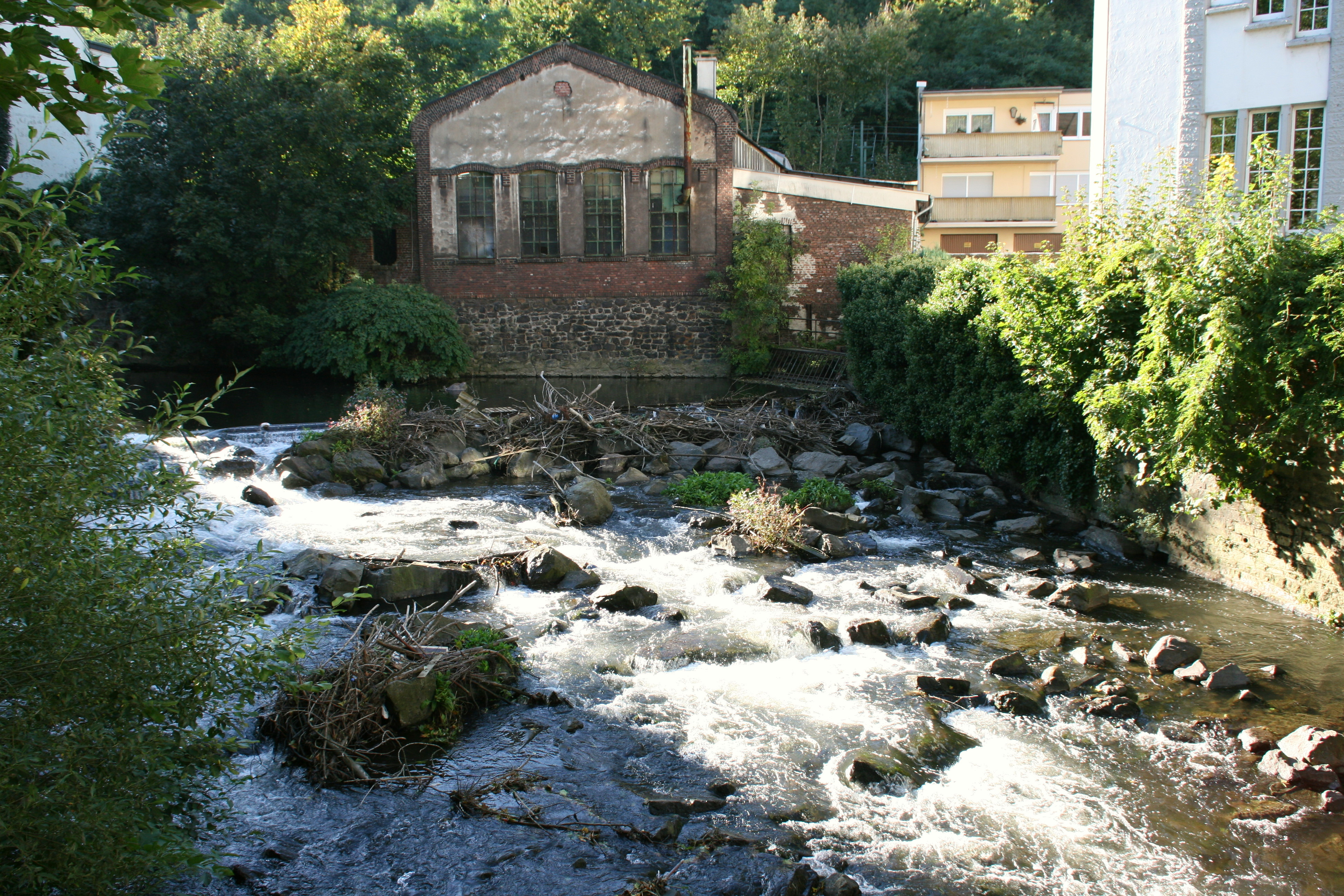

Location
- Country: Germany

Physical characteristics
- Source
  - location: Sauerland
  - elevation: 422 m (1,385 ft)
- Mouth
  - location: Volme
  - coordinates: 51.3656°N 7.4544°E
  - elevation: 99 m (325 ft)
- Length: 42.1 km (26.2 mi)
- Basin size: 188 km^{2} (73 sq mi)

Basin features
- Progression: Volme→ Ruhr→ Rhine→ North Sea

The Ennepe (German pronunciation: [ˈɛnəpə]) is a river, and a left tributary of the Volme in Northern Sauerland, Germany.

It gave its name to the town Ennepetal, and the district Ennepe-Ruhr-Kreis.

== Course of River ==
The Ennepe begins in the Märkischer Kreis southeast of Halver, at 422 m above sea level, and continues to the Ennepetalsperre (reservoir, 307 m above sea level).

The river flows through Ennepetal, Gevelsberg, and the western boroughs of Hagen.

It flows into the Volme, near Hagen Central Station (elevation: 99 m above sea level).

Parts of the river are canalized.

== Flora and fauna ==
The Ennepe provides habitat for numerous animal and plant types.

Among are fishes, the grey heron, neophyte plants, and Orange Jewelweed (Impatiens capensis, in Hagen).

== Industrial use ==
In the pre-industrial age, several mills were built alongside the river.

In the 19th and 20th centuries, several small iron plants were operated there.
