= Volme =

River in Germany

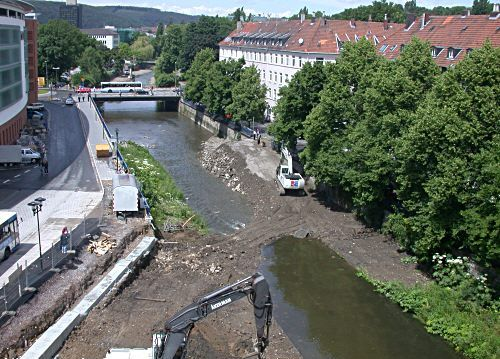
- Volme in Hagen (2004)

Location
- Country: Germany
- State: North Rhine-Westphalia

Physical characteristics
- Source
  - location: Southeastern Ruhr Area
  - elevation: 480 m (1,570 ft)
- Mouth
  - location: Ruhr
  - coordinates: 51°23′33″N 7°26′27″E
  - elevation: 91 m (299 ft)
- Length: 50.7 km (31.5 mi)
- Basin size: 428 km^{2} (165 sq mi)

Basin features
- Progression: Ruhr→ Rhine→ North Sea
- Tributaries
  - left: Ennepe

The Volme (German pronunciation: [ˈfɔlmə]) is a river in North Rhine-Westphalia, Germany, and is a tributary of the river Ruhr. It is 50.5 kilometres (31.4 mi) long, of which about 21 km (13 mi) lie within the city limits of Hagen. Its largest tributary is the Ennepe.

The Volme rises at 480 metres (1,570 ft) above sea level in the southeastern part of the Ruhr region, southeast of the town Meinerzhagen. It flows through the municipalities of Meinerzhagen, Kierspe, Halver (Oberbrügge), Lüdenscheid (Brügge), Schalksmühle and Hagen and empties into the Ruhr at 91 m (299 ft) above sea level. In the city of Hagen, the Volme is predominantly canalised, and since 2004 has been under restoration.

Tributaries of the Volme are, from the mouth upstream:

- Ennepe (in Hagen centre)
- Sterbecke (in Hagen-Rummenohl)
- Hälver (in Schalksmühle)
- Elspe (in Lüdenscheid-Brügge)
- Wiebelsaat (in Meinerzhagen)

== Industrial development ==
In the pre-industrial age, numerous mills, smithies and foundries arose along the Volme, from which the iron industry developed during the 19th and the 20th centuries. The Hagen–Dieringhausen railway runs through the valley.

== See also ==
- List of rivers of North Rhine-Westphalia
