= Roads in Kazakhstan =

The general structure of a dual carriageway in Kazakhstan.

A list of roads in Kazakhstan.

== Systems ==
=== current system ===
On 30 October 2024, a ministerial order by the government of Kazakhstan overhauled and changed the road numbering system of the country for all classifications. The previous classification and number of "highways of international" and "republican" significance (M, A, and P) were abolished and a new system was introduced.

The new system consists of two categories:

- KAZ – highways of international or republican significance; providing connection between regions of Kazakhstan (and possibly to a neighboring states)
- KZ## – highways of international or republican significance, where the ## would be two digits corresponding to each region's code (matching license plate codes); providing connection within each of Kazakhstan (and possibly to a neighboring states)

The total length of these roads is 24,910.91 km.

==== Inter-regional Highways ====
The total length of these roads is 16,554.09 km.

Below is a list of these inter-regional highways of international or republican significance:

Road	Direction	International Designation	Previous Designation	Length
KAZ01; KAZ01	Astana – Karaganda (bypass) – Almaty	E125; AH7	M-36	1207.95 km
KAZ02; KAZ02	Astana – Kokshetau (bypass) – Petropavl – Russian international border ( 71A-1109 )	E125; AH6, AH64	M-51/A-1	526 km
KAZ03	Astana – Atbasar – Zhaksy – Ruzayevka – Sarykol – Kostanay (bypass) – Russian international border ( A-310 )	E127; AH7	M-36	860.3 km
KAZ04; KAZ04	Astana – Shiderti (KAZ13) – Pavlodar – Uspenka – Russian international border ( 50K-32 )	E018; AH64	A-17	638 km
KAZ05	Astana – Kabanbai Batyr (KZ03-08) – Nura – Temirtau		P-3	250 km
KAZ06	Russian international border ( P-239 ) – Martuk - Aktobe (Northern Bypass) - Karabutak – Kyzylorda – Shymkent (Northern Bypass) – Taraz (Bypass) – Korday – Almaty – Khorgos – Chinese international border ( G30 )	E38, E123, E004, E012; AH5, AH9, AH61, AH62	M-32/A-2/A-19/A-24/P-50	2687.44 km
KAZ07	Chinese international border ( S319 ) - Maykapshagay - Zaysan (Bypass) - Kalbatau (KAZ08) - Semey - Pavlodar - Russian international border ( A-320 )	E127; AH60, AH64	M-38	1081 km
KAZ08; KAZ08	Almaty – Taldykorgan – Usharal (KZ19-02) - Sarkand (Bypass) - Taskesken (KZ18-03) - Ayagoz (Bypass)(KAZ15) - Kalbatau (KAZ07) - Oskemen – Shemonaikha – Russian international border ( 01K-09 )	E40; AH60	A-3	1207 km
KAZ09	Aktobe – Kandyagash – Dossor – Atyrau – Kurmangazy - Russian international border ( 12A-235 )	E121; AH63	A-27	865.4 km
KAZ10	Aktobe – Oral – Beybitshilik - Russian international border ( A-300 )	E38, E40; AH61, AH63	M-32	528 km
KAZ11	Dossor – Kulsary – Beyneu – Say-Otes – Shetpe – Zhetibay – Aktau sea port	E40, E121; AH63, AH70, AH81	A-33	786 km
KAZ12	Atyrau – Oral	E121; AH63	A-28	487 km
KAZ13	Jezkazgan - Arkalyk - Petropavl	E123, E019; AH62	A-16	940 km
KAZ14	Kyzylorda – Jezkazgan – Karaganda – Shiderti (KAZ04)	E018; AH62	A-17	1175 km
KAZ15	Karaganda – Botakara (KAZ20) - Ayagoz (KAZ08) – Tarbagatay – Bugaz (KAZ07)		A-20	921 km
KAZ16	Kokshetau – Kishkenekol – Bidayk – Russian international border ( 5A-5 )		A-13	278 km
KAZ17	Kokshetau – Ruzayevka (KAZ03)		P-11	196 km
KAZ18	Kostanay – Mamlyut		A-21	406 km
KAZ19	Kostanay – Rudny – Denisovka – Komsomol'skoe – Karabutak		A-22	543 km
KAZ20	Kalkaman (KAZ04) – Bayanaul – Umitker – Botakara (KAZ15)		P-27	324 km
KAZ21	Oskemen – Semey		P-24	195 km
KAZ22	Akshatau (KAZ01) – Agadyr – Ortau - Bidayyk (KAZ14)		P-35	195 km
KAZ23	Kostanay – Auliekol – Surgan (KAZ13)		P-36	257 km

==== Intra-regional Highways ====
The total length of these roads is 8,356.82 km.

Below is a list of these intra-regional highways of international or republican significance, organized by their corresponding region:

Astana City
Road	Direction	International Designation	Previous Designation	Length
KZ01-01	Astana City Bypass Road	E125; AH7	P-10	86.1 km
Almaty City
Road	Direction	International Designation	Previous Designation	Length
KZ02-01; KZ02-01	Big Almaty Ring Road		P-67	66 km
Akmola Region
Road	Direction	International Designation	Previous Designation	Length
KZ03-01	Astana - Korgalzhyn - Korgalzhyn Nature Reserve		P-2	161 km
KZ03-02	Makinsk - Stepnogorsk - Turgay (KAZ04)		P-6	240 km
KZ03-03	Shchuchinsk - Access and Circulation of Burabay National Park		P-7	66 km
KZ03-04	Shchuchinsk - Zerendi		P-8	77 km
KZ03-05	Babatai (KAZ01) - Vyacheslavskoe Reservoir		P-9	17 km
KZ03-06	Kokshetau - Zerendi - Atbasar		P-12	184 km
KZ03-07	Kokshetau City Bypass (via Airport)		P-14	18 km
KZ03-08	Kabanbai Batyr (KAZ05) - Kabanbai Batyr Memorial Complex; 50.8726149,71.4145716		P-42	4 km
KZ03-09	Shchuchinsk (KAZ02) - Borovoe Resort Zone		P-46	8.9 km
KZ03-10	Eski Kalkutan (KAZ03) - Jana Kalkutan (KC-8); 51.79053,69.47345		P-52	14.6 km
KZ03-11	Turgay (KAZ04) - Ereymentau - KAZ04		P-55	36 km
KZ03-12	Zhaksy (KAZ03) - Esil - Buzuluk (KAZ13)		P-13	82 km
Aktobe Region
Road	Direction	International Designation	Previous Designation	Length
KZ04-01	Aktobe – Alimbet – Russian international border ( M-5 )		A-25	120.8 km
KZ04-02	Kandyagash – Embi – Shalkar – Yrgyz		A-26	401 km
Almaty Region
Road	Direction	International Designation	Previous Designation	Length
KZ05-01	Bayseit (KAZ06) - Kokpek (KZ05-06) - Chundzha (KZ05-05) - Koktal (KZ05-02)(KZ19-01)		A-2/A-5/A-6	160km
KZ05-02	Koktal (KZ05-01/KZ19-01) - Jarkent - Khorgos		A-2	69 km
KZ05-03	Qonayev - Kurti		P-18	67 km
KZ05-04	Almaty – Ushkonyr – Uzynagash – Akkaynar – Suranshy batyr – Kastek		A-4	115 km
KZ05-05	Aksay – Chundzha (KZ05-01) – Kalzhat - Chinese international border ( G219 )		A-5	160 km
KZ05-06	Kokpek (KZ05-01) – Kegen – Kyrgyz international border ( ЭМ-08 )	E011	A-6	115 km
KZ05-07	Kegen - Narynkol		P-15	89 km
KZ05-08	KZ05-06 - Zhalanash - Saty - Kolsay Lakes National Park		P-16	89 km
KZ05-09	Almaty - Talgar - Baidibek Bi		P-17	68 km
KZ05-10	Almaty - Bayserka - Tonkeris - Mezhdurechenskoe - KAZ01		P-19	52 km
KZ05-11	Almaty - Alma-Arasan - Mountain Space Station; 43.0424,76.9442		P-22	37 km
KZ05-12	Besagash - Alatau Mountains		P-21	15 km
KZ05-13	Almaty - Alatau Park of Innovative Technologies		P-48	9.95 km
Atyrau Region
Road	Direction	International Designation	Previous Designation	Length
KZ06-01	Mukyr (KAZ09) – Kulsary (KAZ11)		P-33	136 km
KZ06-02	Makhambet (KAZ12) - Khamit Yergaliyev (KAZ09); AKA Atyrau Bypass		P-40	45 km
KZ06-03	Dossor Bypass		KЕ-42	4.6 km
West Kazakhstan Region
Road	Direction	International Designation	Previous Designation	Length
KZ07-01	Oral - Chuvanshinskoye - Russian international border ( 53K-2801000 )		A-32	28 km
KZ07-02	Chapaev (KAZ12) - Zhalpaktal - Kaztal - Russian international border ( 63K-00035 )		A-31	213 km
KZ07-03	Kaztal (KZ07-02) - Zhanybek - Russian international border ( P-229 )		P-44	165 km
KZ07-04	Podsepnoye – Fyodorovka – Russian international border ( A-305 )		A-30	72 km
KZ07-05	Önege (KZ07-03) - Bisen - Saykyn		P-51	103 km
KZ07-06	Oral – Taskala – Russian international border ( A-298 )	E38	A-29	100 km
KZ07-07	KZ07-05 - Khan Orda		P-56	21 km
Zhambyl Region
Road	Direction	International Designation	Previous Designation	Length
KZ08-01	Taraz - Kyrgyz international border ( ЭМ-17 )		A-14	14 km
KZ08-02	KZ08-03 - Karasu - Masanchi - Sortobe - Kyrgyz international border ( ЭМ-11 )		P-66	45.45 km
KZ08-03	Korday (Northern Bypass) - Karasu (KZ08-02/P-66) - Kyrgyz international border ( М-032 )		P-47	17.7 km
KZ08-04	Merki - Shu (KZ08-05) - Khantau - Burylbaytal (KAZ01)	AH7	P-29	261.45 km
KZ08-05	Shu (KZ08-04) - Kaynar (KAZ06)		P-30	56 km
KZ08-06	Korday - Kyrgyz international border ( ЭМ-01 )	E40	A-2	6 km
KZ08-07	Merki - Sypatay Batyr - Kyrgyz international border ( ЭМ-03 )	E40; AH7	M-39	24.3 km
Karagandy Region
Road	Direction	International Designation	Previous Designation	Length
KZ09-01	Temirtau (KAZ01) - Aktau - Bastau (KAZ15) (Karagandy Bypass)		P-37	53 km
KZ09-02	Northern Suburb of Karagandy (KAZ01) - Entrance to Karagandy (Maykundyk)		P-54	7 km
Kostanay Region
Road	Direction	International Designation	Previous Designation	Length
KZ10-01	Denisovka (KAZ19) – Zhetikara – Muktikol - Russian international border ( 53K-0202000 )		A-23	137 km
KZ10-02	Zhetikara (KZ10-01) - Chaykovskoye - Russian international border ( 75K-009 )		P-64	27 km
KZ10-03	Denisovka (KAZ19) - Tavrichenka - Arshaly - Komarovka		P-63	96 km
KZ10-04	Rudny Western Bypass	‌	P-43	6.9 km
KZ10-05	KAZ03 - Marinovka	‌	P-65	9 km
KZ10-06	Kostanay Southern Bypass; KAZ23 - KAZ19	‌	P-38	6 km
KZ10-07	Kostanay Western Bypass; KAZ03 - KAZ19	‌	P-39	21 km
Kyzylorda Region
Road	Direction	International Designation		Previous Designation Length
KZ11-01	Kyzylorda City Bypass; KAZ06 - KAZ06	‌ E38; AH9		20 km
Mangystau Region
Road	Direction	International Designation	Previous Designation	Length
KZ12-01	Aktau – Kuryk	‌	A-35	59 km
KZ12-02	Beyneu - Akzhigit - Uzbek international border ( A380 )	‌ E40; AH70	P-1	85 km
KZ12-03	Zhetibay – Zhanaozen - Turkmen international border ( P18 )	‌ E40, E121; AH70	A-34	229 km
KZ12-04	Kuryk - Zhetibay	‌	A-36	64 km
Turkistan Region
Road	Direction	International Designation	Previous Designation	Length
KZ13-01	Uzbek international border ( 25V031 ) - Zhetisay - Asykata - Lesbek Batyr - Saryagash - Zhibek Zholy (KZ13-03) branch: KZ13-01 - Atakent - Myrzakent - Uzbek international border ( D038 , Guliston) branch: Atakent - Uzbek international border ( D039 , Sirdaryo) branch: Lesbek Batyr (KZ13-01) - Eskikogran -Uzbek international border ( D026 , Chinoz) branch: Saryagash (KZ13-01) - Saryagash Santorium - Uzbek international border ( D003 )	‌	A-15	221 km
KZ13-02	Uzbek international border ( M39 ) - Maktazhan - Orgebas - Uzbek international border ( M39 ) (portions of Uzbek M39 that cross into Kazakhstan)	‌	M-39	24.1 km
KZ13-03	Shymkent - Kazygurt - Zhibek Zholy - Uzbek international border ( M39 )	‌ E004; AH5	A-2	98 km
KZ13-04	KAZ06 - Turar Ryskulov - KAZ06	‌	P-53	36.9 km
Pavlodar Region
Road	Direction	International Designation	Previous Designation	Length
KZ14-01	Pavlodar – Sharbakty – Russian international border ( A-321 )	‌	A-18	112 km
KZ14-02	Atameken (KAZ04) - Ertis - Amangeldi - Russian international border ( 5A-02 )	‌	P-41	263.78 km
KZ14-03	Atameken (KAZ04) - Aksu - Koktobe - Kurchatov	‌	P-45	220 km
KZ14-04	Pavlodar Southern Bypass via new bridge on Irtysh	‌	P-5	15 km
North Kazakhstan Region
Road	Direction	International Designation	Previous Designation	Length
KZ15-01	Petropavl – Sokolovka – Russian international border ( 71A-1109 )	‌ E125	A-12	62 km
KZ15-02	Peterfeld (KAZ02) – Arkhangelsk - Novokamenka - KAZ13	‌	P-57	30.52 km
KZ15-03	Bulaeyvo - Vozvyshenka (KZ15-10) - Molodogvardeyskoe - Kirovo - Kiyaly - Roshshinskoye (KAZ02/KZ15-04)	‌	P-58	228.4 km
KZ15-04	Roshshinskoye (KAZ02/KZ15-03) - Korneyevka - Voloshinka (KZ15-05)	‌	P-59	86.9 km
KZ15-05	Voloshinka (KZ15-04) - Sergeyev (KAZ13) - Timiryazevo (KZ15-08)	‌	P-60	119.4 km
KZ15-06	KAZ02 - Petropavl Airport (Kazakhstan)	‌	P-62	5 km
KZ15-07	Saumalkol (KAZ17) - Karasay Batyr - Karasai and Agyntaya Batyr Memorial Complex	‌	P-28	24 km
KZ15-08	Timiryazevo (KZ15-05) - Kostanay Region boundary - Sarykol (KAZ03)	‌	P-61	31.6 km
KZ15-09	Petropavl City Bypass (South, East, North)	‌ E125; AH6	P-49	30 km
KZ15-10	Petropavl (KZ15-09) - Karakoga - Russian international border ( P-254 )	‌ AH6	M-51	120 km
East Kazakhstan Region
Road	Direction	International Designation	Previous Designation	Length
KZ16-01	Oskemen - Altai - Ulken Naryn - Katonkaragay - Rakhman Kainary	‌	P-25	446 km
KZ16-02	Oskemen - Ridder - Russian international border ( 84K-121 )	‌ E40	A-9	167 km
KZ16-03	KAZ07 m- Kalzhyr - Markakol	‌	P-26	‌124 km
Shymkent City
Road	Direction	International Designation	Previous Designation	Length
KZ17-01	Shymkent City Northern Bypass Road; KAZ06 - KAZ06	E40; AH7	P-32	36.5 km
Abai Region
Road	Direction	International Designation	Previous Designation	Length
KZ18-01	Semey - Kaynar (KAZ15)	‌	P-23	276 km
KZ18-02	Semey - Auil - Russian international border ( A-322 )	‌	A-11	111 km
KZ18-03	Taskesken (KAZ08) - Bakty - Chinese international border ( S319 / G3015 )	‌ E015	A-8	187 km
Zhetysu Region
Road	Direction	International Designation	Previous Designation	Length
KZ19-01	Saryozek - Koktal (KZ05-01/KZ05-02)	‌ E013; AH68	P-20	276 km
KZ19-02	Usharal (KAZ08) - Dostyk - Alatau - Chinese international border ( G219 )	E014	A-7	184 km
Ulytau Region
Road	Direction	International Designation	Previous Designation	Length
KZ20-01	Tugisken (KAZ14) - Zhayrem - Karazhal - Atasu (KAZ14)	E014	P-34	144 km

== Previous Systems ==
=== 2015 - 2024 ===
The codes were in Latin, and thus, transliteration is not required (for example writing "P" as "R"). The highways of general government ("Republican") Significance were divided into three groups whose names differ by a code letter:

- М – highways of international significance; their names and kilometer was retained by the road network of the Soviet Union
- A – highways of international significance; their names were changed from the 3-digit numbering of the Soviet system, being replaced by sequential numbering, A01 to A26
- P – highways of republican importance; P01 to P66

==== International highways ====
Road	Direction	Length
M-32	Border of Russia – Oral – Aktobe – Kyzylorda – Shymkent	2059,6 km
M-36; M-36	Border of Russia – Kostanay – Astana – Karaganda – Almaty	2047,1 km
M-38	Border of Russia – Pavlodar – Semey – Maikapschagai – Border of China	1081 km
M-39	Border of Kirghizistan – Lugovoy	24,1 km
M-51	Border of Russia – Petropavl – Border of Russia	190 km

==== National Highways ====
Road	Direction	Soviet Designation	Length
A-1; A-1	Astana – Kokshetau – Petropavl	A-343	456 km
A-2	Border of Uzbekistan – Shymkent – Taraz – Almaty – Border of China (after N312); Branch: Kenen - Korday - Border of Kyrgyzstan	M-39/A-351/A-353/A-359/P-24	1292 km
A-3; A-3	Almaty – Oskemen	A-350	1212 km
A-4	Almaty – Uzynagash – border of Kyrgyzstan	P-13	132 km
A-5	Aksay – Chundzha – border of China	A-352/P-24	160 km
A-6	Kokpek – Kegen – border of Kyrgyzstan	A-351/A-362	115 km
A-7	Usharal – Dostyk	A-355	184 km
A-8	Taskesken – Bakhty – border of China	A-356	187 km
A-9	Oskemen – Ridder – border of Russia	P-147/P-156	167 km
A-10	Oskemen – Shemonaikha – border of Russia	P-151	120 km
A-11	Semey – Rubtsovsk	A-349	111 km
A-12	Petropavl – Sokolovka – border of Russia		62 km
A-13	Kokshetau – Kishkenekol – border of Russia (after P-393)	P-393	278 km
A-14	Taraz – border of Kyrgyzstan	A-361	14 km
A-15	Zhybek Zholy – Zhetysai – border of Uzbekistan	P-3	150 km
A-16	Jezkazgan – Petropavl	-A342	940 km
A-17; A-17	Kyzylorda – Pavlodar – Uspenka	A-342/A-344	1509 km
A-18	Pavlodar – Sharbakty – border of Russia	P-371	122 km
A-19	Terenkol – Mikhailovka – border of Russia	P-171	108 km
A-20	Temirtau – Ayagoz – Tarbaghatai – M38 (Bugas)	A-345/A-346	921 km
A-21	Mamlyut – Kostanay	A-341	398 km
A-22	Karabutak – Komsomol'skoe, Kazakhstan – Denisovka – Rudny, Kazakhstan – Kostanay	P-76/P-278	551 km
A-23	Denisovka – Zhetikara – Muktikol	P-278	142 km
A-24	Aktobe – Martok – border of Russia	P-81	105 km
A-25	Aktobe – Alimbet – border of Russia	P-87	127 km
A-26	Kandyagash – Embi – Shalkar – Yrgyz	P-75/P-86	401 km
A-27	Aktobe – Kandyagash – Atyrau – border of Russia	A-340	871 km
A-28	Oral – Atyrau	P-246	487 km
A-29	Oral – Taskala – border of Russia	P-236	100 km
A-30	Podsepnoye – Fyodorovka – border of Russia	P-335	144 km
A-31	Chapaev – Kaztal – Zhanybek	P-95	218 km
A-32	Oral – Chuvanshinskoye - border of Russia	P-248	28 km
A-33	Dossor – Aktau	P-110/P-114/P-118	798 km
A-34	Zhetybai – Zhanaozen – border of Turkmenistan	P-114	237 km
A-35	Aktau – Kuryk	P-114	59 km
A-36	Kuryk – Zhetybai	P-118	64 km

==== Regional Highways ====
Road	Direction	Previous Designation	Length
P-1	Beyneu - Akzhigit - Border of Uzbekistan	A-380	84 km
P-2	Astana - Korgalzhyn - Korgalzhyn Nature Reserve	P-206	161 km
P-3	Astana - Kievka - Temirtau	P-196	250 km
P-4; P-4	Astana - Ereymetau - Shiderty	P-177	243 km
P-5	Pavlodar Southern Bypass via new bridge on Irtysh		15 km
P-6	Makinsk - Stepnogorsk - Turgay	P-210	235 km
P-7	Burabay National Park	P-223/P-224	66 km
P-8	Shchuchinsk - Zeredi	P-229/P-230	80 km
P-9	Vyacheslavskoe Reservoir	P-204	17 km
P-10	Astana Bypass		52.7 km
P-11	Kokshetau - Saumalkol - Ruzaevka	P-232	196 km
P-12	Kokshetau - Zerendi - Atbasar	P-214	184 km
P-13	Zhaksy - Esil - Buzuluk	A-342/P-262	82 km
P-14	Kokshetau Bypass		18 km
P-15	Kegen - Narynkol	A-351	89 km
P-16	A-6 - Zhalanash - Saty - Kolsay Lakes National Park		89 km
P-17	Almaty - Talgar - Baidibek Bi	P-1	71 km
P-18	Qonayev - Kurty		67 km
P-19	Bayserka - Chalaevo - Mezhdurechenskoe	P-15	52 km
P-20	Saryozek - Koktal	A-353	192 km
P-21	Alatau Mountains		15 km
P-22	Almaty - Alma-Arasan	P-9	45 km
P-23	Semey - Kaynar	P-139	276 km
P-24	Oskemen - Semey	P-141/P-155	195 km
P-25	Oskemen - Zyryanovsk - Ulken-Naryn - Katonkaragay - Rakhmanovskie Klyuchi	P-147/P-163	446 km
P-26	M-38 - Kalzhyr - Terekty	P-147/P-164	126 km
P-27	Kalkaman - Bayanaul - Umutker - Botakara	P-175	324 km
P-28	Saumalkol - Madeniet - Karasai and Agyntaya Batyr Memorial Complex		24 km
P-29	Merki - Shu - Khantau - M-39	A-358	273 km
P-30	Shu - Kaynar	A-358/P-37	56 km
P-31	Kentau - Turkistan - Arystan Bab - tortkoly	P-58	145 km
P-32	Shymkent Bypass		13 km
P-33	Mukyr (A-27/KAZ09) – Kulsary (A-33/KAZ11)		136 km
P-34	Togusken - Zhayrem - Karazhal - Atasu		144 km
P-35	Akchatau - Agadyr - Otrau - A-17	P-182	195 km
P-36	Kostanay - Auliekol - Surgan	P-263/P-265	257 km
P-37	Botakara - Aktau - Temirtau (Karaganda Bypass)	P-194	53 km
P-38	Kostanay Southern Bypass (At Minchurinskoe)		6 km
P-39	Kostanay Western Bypass; M-36 - A-22		21 km
P-40	Atyrau Bypass; Makhambet (A-28) - Khamit Yergaliyev (A-27)	p-104	21 km
P-41	Atameken (P-4) - Ertis - Amangeldi - Russian international border ( 5A-02 )	P-168	45 km
P-42	Kabanbay Batyr - Kabanbay Batyr Memorial Complex; 50.8726149,71.4145716		4 km
P-43	Rudny West Bypass		6.9 km
P-44	Kaztal - Zhanybek - Border of Russia	P-96	162 km
P-45	Atameken - Aksi - Koktobe - Kurchatov	P-174	227 km
P-46	A-1 - Shchuchinsk-Borovoe Resort Zone		8.9 km
P-47	Korday (A-2) - Karasu (P-66) - Border of Kyrgyzstan		17.7 km
P-48	Almaty - Alatau Park of Innovative Technologies		9.95 km
P-49	Petropavl Bypass		30 km
P-50	Northern Aktobe Bypass		39.3 km
P-51	Önege (P-44) - Bisen - Saykyn	P-97	103 km
P-52	Novyy Koluton - Akkol - A-1 - Sazdı Bulaq - Stepnogorskoye (P-6)		222 km
P-53	A-2 - Turar Ryskulov - A-2	M-39	31 km
P-54	M-36 - Karaganda		16 km
P-55	P-4 - Ereymentau	P-177	36 km
P-56	P-51 - Khan Orda		21 km
P-57	Peterfeld (M-51) - A-16		30.5 km
P-58	Bulayevo (M-51) - Vozvyshenka - Molodogvardeyskoye - Kirovo - Kiyaly - Roshchinsky (A-1/P-59)	P-249	228.4 km
P-59	Roshchinsky (A-1/P-58) - Korneyevka - Voloshinka (P-60)	P-249	86.9 km
P-60	Voloshinka (P-59) - Sergeyev - Timiryazevo (P-61)	P-249	119.4 km
P-61	Timiryazevo (P-60) - Sarykol (M-36)	P-249	31.6 km
P-62	A-1 - Petropavl Airport		5 km
P-63	Denisovka - Tavrichen - Arshaly - Komarovka	P-76	96 km
P-64	Zhetikara - Chaykovsky	P-280	27 km
P-65	M-36 - Marinkova		9 km
P-66	Karasu (P-47) - Masanchi - Sortobe		45 km
P-67; P-67	Big Almaty Ring Road		66 km

=== The Soviet System ===
The Soviet highway numbering system, implemented in 1982, was the first which the abovementioned 3-tiered national system (as well as a local system). "M" numbers, highways of Union (and later, "international" significance) were either 1 or 2 digits, and in Kazakhstan these were retained until the 2024 overhaul. "A" numbers consisted of 3 digits and constituted a 2nd tier set of highways of Union/international significance. The "P" numbers (highways of republican significance, numbers that started from 1 and went up in each individual republic) were a 3rd tier of highway numbering. In Kazakhstan, the "A" and "P" road numbers were scrapped, and a new set of "A" and "P" numbers were introduced, starting from A-1 and P-1 respectively, going upwards.

== Highway of local significance ==
There are also highways of local significance. Each of Kazakhstan's regions' highways have their own specific codes. The codes are in Latin, and thus, transliteration is not required. Within each region, highways in each specific district are further designated with an additional two-letter prefix.

- Abai Region
  - KU, and the list of highways can be seen from this link (Archive)
- Akmola Region
  - KC, and the list of highways can be seen from this link (Archive)
- Aktobe Region
  - KD, and the list of highways can be seen from this link (Archive)
  - KD-AL, Alga District: link (Archive)
  - KD-AT, Ayteke Bi District: link (Archive)
  - KD-BA, Bayganin District: link (Archive)
  - KD-IR, Yrgyz District: link (Archive)
  - KD-KA, Kargaly District: link (Archive)
  - KD-KO, Kobda District: link (Archive)
  - KD-MU, Mugalzhar District: link (Archive)
  - KD-SH, Shalkar District: link (Archive)
  - KD-TE, Temir District: link (Archive)
  - KD-UL, Oiyl District: link (Archive)
- Almaty Region, Jetisu Region
  - KB, and the list of highways can be seen from this link (Archive)
- Atyrau Region
  - KE, and the list of highways can be seen from this link (Archive)
- East Kazakhstan Region
  - KF, and the list of highways can be seen from this link (Archive)
  - KF-KR, Kurshim District: link (Archive)
  - KF-KT, Ulken Naryn District: link (Archive)
- Jambyl Region
  - KH, and the list of highways can be seen from this link (Archive)
  - KH-KR, Korday District: link (Archive)
  - KH-SH, Shu District: link (Archive)
- Karaganda Region, Ulytau Region
  - KM, and the list of highways can be seen from this link (Archive)
- Kostanay Region
  - KP, and the list of highways can be seen from this link (Archive)
- Kyzylorda Region
  - KN, and the list of highways can be seen from this link (Archive)
  - KNA, Aral District: link (Archive)
  - KNB, Kazaly District: link (Archive)
  - KNC, Karmakshy District: link (Archive)
  - KND, Jalagash District: link (Archive)
  - KNE, Syrdariya District: link (Archive)
  - KNG, Shieli District: link (Archive)
  - KNH, Janakorgan District: link (Archive)
- Mangystau Region
  - KR, and the list of highways can be seen from this link (Archive)
  - KR-BG, Beyneu District: link (Archive)
  - KR-KG, Karakiya District: link (Archive)
  - KR-MG, Mangystau District: link (Archive)
  - KR-MU, Munaily District: link (Archive)
  - KR-TG, Tupkaragan District: link (Archive)
- North Kazakhstan Region
  - KT, and the list of highways can be seen from this link (Archive)
  - KTGY, Magzhan Zhumabayev District: link (Archive)
  - KTTA, Taiynsha District: link (Archive)
  - KTTM, Timiryazev District: link (Archive)
- Pavlodar Region
  - KS, and the list of highways can be seen from this link (Archive)
- Turkistan Region
  - KX, and the list of highways can be seen from this link (Archive)
- West Kazakhstan Region
  - KL, and the list of highways can be seen from this link (Archive)
  - KL-ZB, Zhanybek District: link (Archive)

== Asian Highways ==
Several of the highway of the Asian Highway Network cross Tajikistan. These include the following:

- AH5
  - KAZ06 : Chinese border - Khorgos - Shelek - Almaty - Kaskelen - Kenen - Korday
  - KZ08-06 : Korday - Kyrgyz border
- AH6
  - KZ15-10 : Russian border - Karakoga - Petropavl
  - KZ15-09 : Petropavl Bypass
  - KAZ02 : Petropavl - Mamlyut - Chistoe - Russian border
- AH7
  - KAZ03 : Russian border - Karaek – Kostanai – Astana
  - KZ01-01 : Astana Bypass
  - KAZ01 : Astana – Karaganda – Burylbaytal
  - KZ08-04 : Burubaytal – Shu – Merke
  - KZ08-07 : Merke – Chaldovar - Russian border
- AH9
  - KAZ06 : Russian border – Martuk - Aktobe (Northern Bypass) - Karabutak – Kyzylorda
  - KAZ06 / KZ11-01 : Kyzylorda Bypass
  - KAZ06 : Kyzylorda – Shymkent
  - KZ17-01 : Shymkent Northern Bypass
  - KAZ06 : Shymkent - Taraz (Bypass) – Korday – Almaty – Khorgos – Chinese border
- AH60
  - KAZ07 : Russian border - Pavlodar - Semey - Kalbatau
  - KAZ08 : Kalbatau - Ayagoz - Taskesken - Sarkand - Usharal - Taldykorgan - Almaty
  - KAZ01 : Almaty – Burylbaytal
- AH61
  - KZ08-06 : Kyrgyz border - Korday
  - KAZ06 : Korday - Taraz (Bypass) - Shymkent
  - KZ17-01 : Shymkent Northern Bypass
  - KAZ06 : Shymkent - Kyzylorda
  - KAZ06 / KZ11-01 : Kyzylorda Bypass
  - KAZ06 : Kyzylorda - Karabutak - Aktobe
  - KAZ10 : Aktobe – Oral
  - KZ07-06 : Oral – Taskala – Russian border
- AH62
  - KAZ13 : Petropavl - Arkalyk - Jezkazgan
  - KAZ14 : Jezkazgan - Kyzylorda
  - KAZ06 / KZ11-01 : Kyzylorda Bypass
  - KAZ06 : Kyzylorda - Shymkent
  - KZ13-03 : Shymkent - Kazygurt - Zhibek Zholy - Uzbek border
- AH63
  - KAZ10 : Russian border - Beybitshilik - Oral
  - KAZ12 : Oral - Atyrau
  - KAZ09 : Atyrau - Dossor
  - KAZ11 : Dossor – Kulsary – Beyneu
  - KZ12-02 : Beyneu - Akzhigit - Uzbek border
- AH64
  - KAZ02 : Petropavl - Kokshetau - Astana
  - KZ01-01 : Astana Bypass
  - KAZ04 : Astana – Shiderti – Pavlodar
  - KAZ07 : Pavlodar - Semey
  - KZ18-02 : Semey - Auil - Russian border
- AH68
  - KZ19-02 : Chinese border - Alatau - Dostyk - Usharal
- AH70
  - KAZ09 : Russian border - Kurmangazy - Atyrau - Dossor
  - KAZ11 : Dossor – Kulsary – Beyneu – Say-Otes – Shetpe – Zhetibay
  - KZ12-03 : Zhetibay – Zhanaozen - Turkmen international border
- AH81
  - KAZ11 : Aktau port – Aktau – Kuryk

== License plate Code ==
Region/City	Old code	New code
Almaty	A	02
Almaty Region	B	05
Astana	Z	01
Akmola Region	C	03
Aktobe Region	D	04
Atyrau Region	E	06
Mangystau Region	R	12
North Kazakhstan Region	T	15
East Kazakhstan Region	F	16
Pavlodar Region	S	14
Karaganda Region	M	09
Kostanay Region	P	10
Kyzylorda Region	N	11
Jambyl Region	H	08
South Kazakhstan Region	X	13
West Kazakhstan Region	L	07
Shymkent		17
Abai Region		18
Jetisu Region		19
Ulytau Region		20

== See also ==
- Full List from 2024 (in Kazakh) https://adilet.zan.kz/kaz/docs/V2400035307 (Archive)
- Full List from 2021 (in Kazakh) https://adilet.zan.kz/kaz/docs/V2100024613 (Archive)
- List of Roads of national importance of the Soviet Union from 1982 (in Russian) Link (Archive)
