= List of E-roads in Russia =

Page listing bus routes in Europe

European routes in Russia

System information
- Maintained by Russian Highways

Highway names
- European routes: European route E nn (E nn)

System links
- Russian Federal Highways

This is a list of European routes, or E-roads, that run through Russia. The current network is signposted according to the 1992 system revision, and contains 21 class A routes and four class B routes within the country. Most routes also carry the federal M, R, and A motorway designations, but a few also carry regional road designations.

== Class-A European routes ==
Number	Length (km)	Length (mi)	Southern or western terminus	Northern or eastern terminus	Formed	Removed	Notes
E18	210	130	Finnish border	Saint Petersburg	—	—	Follows A181; also concurrent with AH8
E20	367	228	Estonian border near Ivangorod	A118 in Saint Petersburg	—	—	Follows A180
E22	—	—	Latvian border near Zasitino	Ishim	—	—	Follows M9, MKAD, M7, R242, R351 and R402
E28	—	—	Polish border near Mamonovo	Belarusian border near Kaliningrad	—	—	Follows A194 and A229
E30	—	—	Belarusian border near Smolensk	Kazakh border near Isilkul	—	—	Follows M1, M5 and R254
E38	—	—	Ukrainian border near Rylsk	Kazakh border near Yershov	—	—	Follows R199, A144 and R236
E40	—	—	Ukrainian border near Donetsk	Kazakh border near Volodarsky	—	—	Follows A260, R22 and A340; concurrent with E119 from Volgograd to Astrakhan; also concurrent with AH70
E50	—	—	Ukrainian border near Shakhty	R217 in Makhachkala	—	—	Follows A270 and R217; concurrent with E115 from Shakhty to Pavlovskaya and E117 from Mineralnye Vody to Beslan
E58	—	—	Ukrainian border near Taganrog	Rostov-on-Don	—	—	Follows A280
E77	—	—	A212 at Pskov; Lithuanian border at Sovetsk	Estonian border Polish border	—	—	Exists in two sections: Pskov to Estonian border (follows A212) and Lithuanian border to Polish border (follows A216 and A229)
E95	282	175	Saint Petersburg	Belarusian border near Nevel	—	—	Follows R23
E97	—	—	Ukrainian border near Port Kavkaz	Georgian border near Sochi	—	—	Follows A290, M4 and A147; concurrent with AH82
E101	—	—	Ukrainian border	Moscow	—	—	Follows M3
E105	2437	1,514	Norwegian border	Ukrainian border	—	—	Follows R21, M10 and M2
E115	1745	1,084	M8 in Yaroslavl	A146 in Novorossiysk	—	—	Follows M8, MKAD, M4 and A146; concurrent with E119 from Moscow to Kashira
E117	—	—	Mineralnye Vody	Georgian border near Nizhniy Lars	—	—	Follows R217 and A161; concurrent with E50 from Mineralnye Vody to Beslan
E119	—	—	Moscow	Azeri border near Samur	—	—	Follows M4, R22, R215 and R217; concurrent with E40 from Volgograd to Astrakhan and E115 from Moscow to Kashira; also concurrent with AH8, AH61 and AH70
E121	—	—	Kazakh border	Samara	—	—	Follows A300; concurrent with AH63
E123	—	—	Kazakh border near Troitsk	Chelyabinsk	—	—	Follows A310
E125	—	—	Ishim	Kazakh border	—	—	Follows 71A-1011 and 71A-1019
E127	—	—	Kazakh border near Karaman	Omsk	—	—	Follows A320; concurrent with AH60

== Class-B European routes ==
Number	Length (km)	Length (mi)	Southern or western terminus	Northern or eastern terminus	Formed	Removed	Notes
E262	—	—	A6 at Latvian border	Ostrov	—	—	Follows 58K-306 and R23
E391	—	—	Ukrainian border	Trosna	—	—	Follows A142 and M3
E592	133	83	Krasnodar	Dzhubga	—	—	Follows M4
E017	323	201	Yelabuga	Ufa	—	—	Follows a portion of M7
