= A27 highway (Kazakhstan) =

Road in Kazakhstan

H27 highway

Route information
- Part of E40

- Part of AH63 and AH70
- Length: 905 km (562 mi)

Major junctions
- East end: Aktobe
- West end: Border of Russia, near Kotyaevka

Location
- Country: Kazakhstan

Highway system
- Transport in Kazakhstan
← A 26	→ A 28

A27 is a national highway in Kazakhstan that runs from the city of Aktobe to the border of Russia with a total length of 905 kilometres (562 mi). It is part of the European route E40, AH63 and AH70.

The A27 begins in the city of Aktobe on the M32 and ends at the border with Russia near Kotyaevka, where the road continues to Astrakhan. It is therefore the second main road in western Kazakhstan after the M32. The A27 runs through Kandyagash and Atyrau, along the northern side of the Caspian Sea. The A27 intersects several other A-roads on the route. The A28 in Atyrau is particularly important. The landscape along the A27 is generally flat with desert and steppe. Around Atyrau, the A27 is about 28 meters below sea level. The last part before the Russian border runs through wetlands with sandbanks. On the Russian side, the A340 continues to Astrakhan, which is about 60 km (37 mi) from the border.
