= AH64 =

AH64 may refer to:

- Boeing AH-64 Apache, an American attack helicopter
- AH64 (highway), in Asia
