= AH61 =

International Highway route in Asia

Asian Highway 61

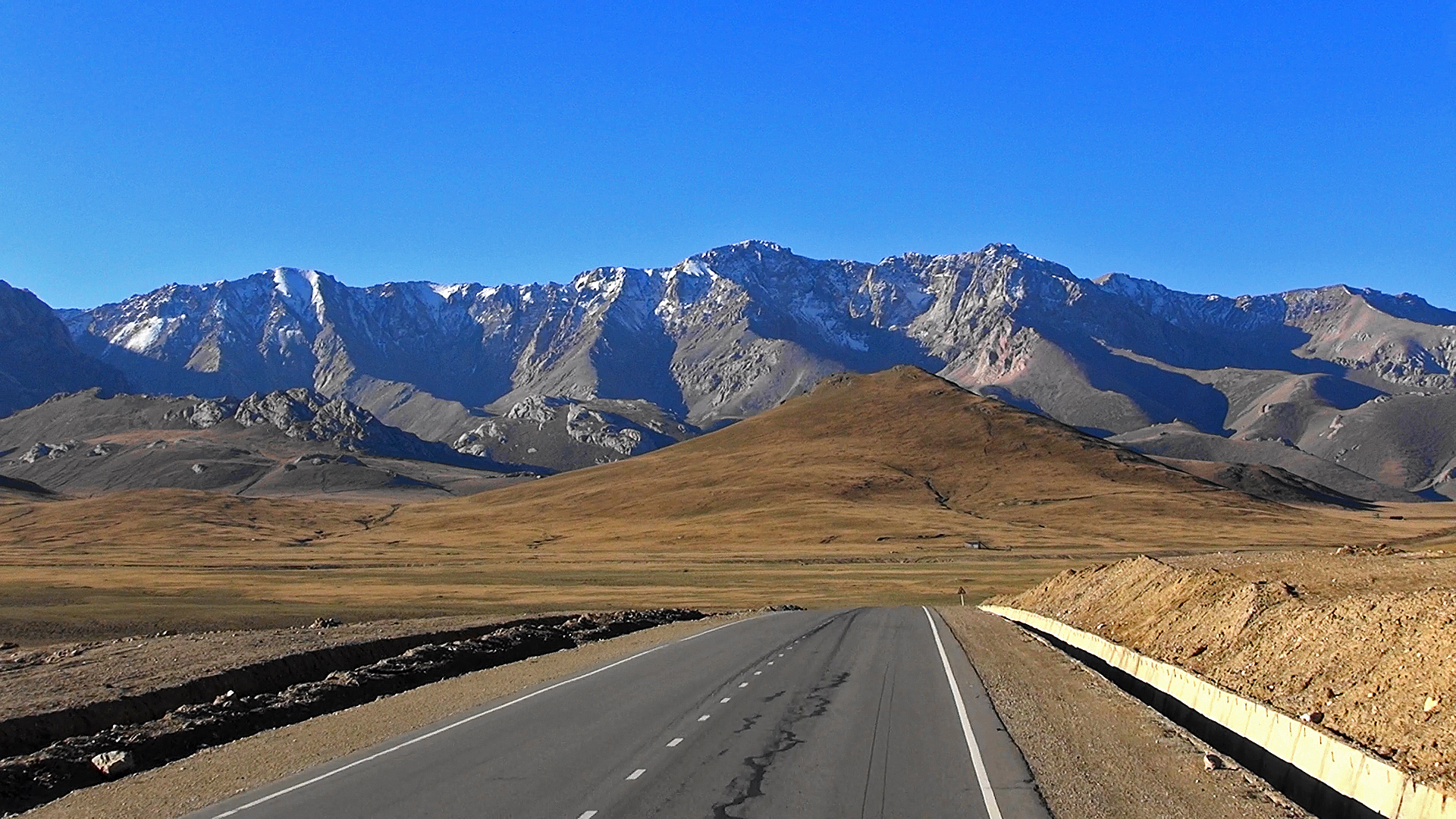
- AH61 route in Kyrgyzstan

Route information
- Length: 4,158 km (2,584 mi)

Major junctions
- East end: Kashi, China
- West end: Krupets, Russia

Location
- Countries: China; Kyrgyzstan; Kazakhstan; Russia

Highway system
- Asian Highway Network
← AH60	→ AH62

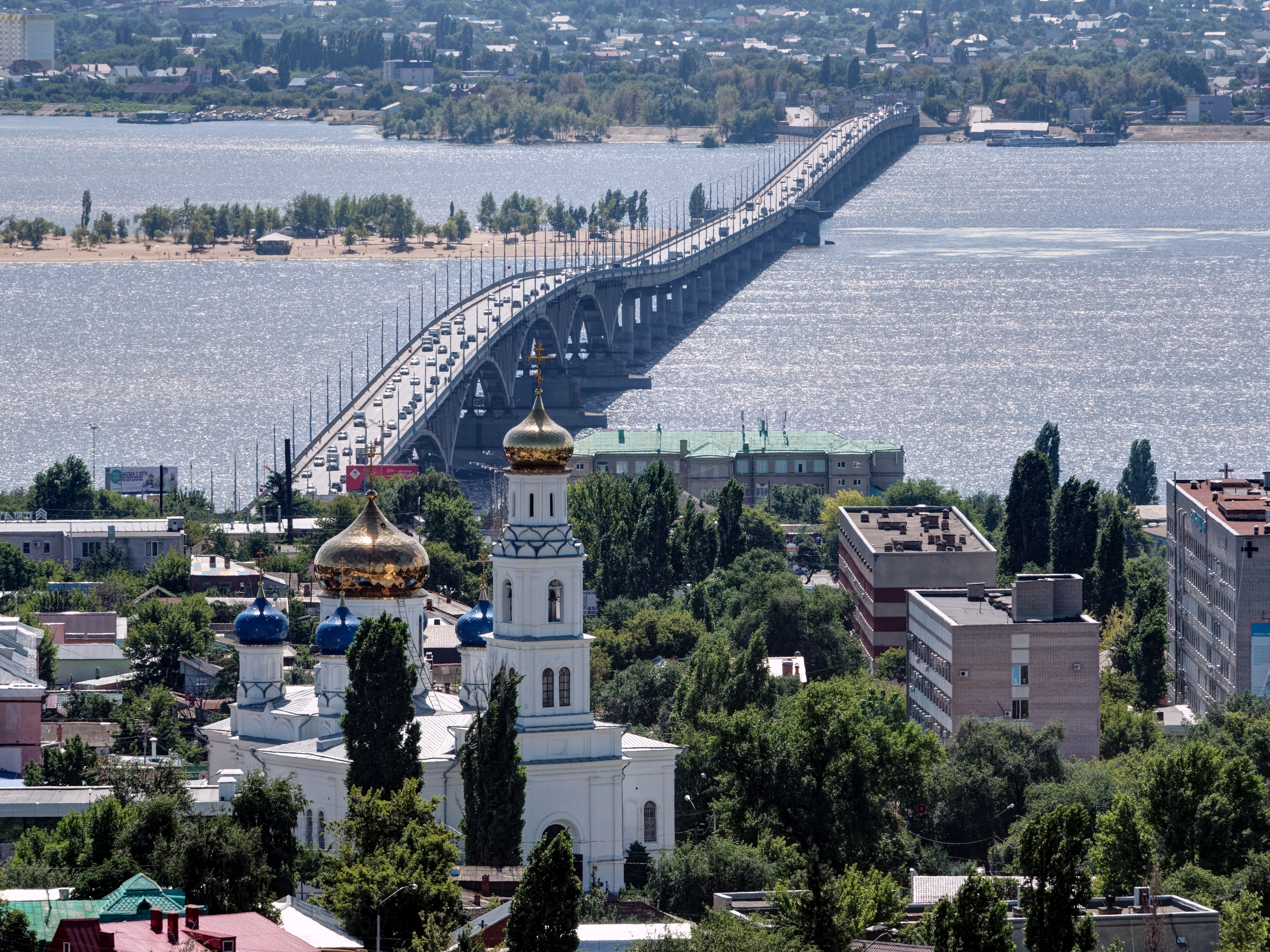
Saratov Bridge on Volga River

Asian Highway 61 or AH61 is an international route running 4,158 kilometres (2,584 mi) from Kashi in China to Krupets in Russia. This route passes through Kyrgyzstan and Kazakhstan also.

== Route ==
Kashi – Turugart – Torougart – Naryn – Bishkek – Georgievka – Kordai – Merke – Shymkent – Kyzylorda – Aralsk – Karabutak – Aktyubinsk – Ural’sk – Kamenka – Ozinki – Saratov – Borysoglebsk – Voronezh – Kursk – Krupets – Border of Ukraine.

Sometimes an alternate end is stated: Kursk - Sudzha - Border of Ukraine.

== Associated routes ==
=== China ===
- G314: Kashgar - Kuquwan
- G3012: Kuquwan - junction with G3013
- G3013: junction with G3013 - Tuopa
- G581: Tuopa - Torugart Pass police station
- G315: Torugart Pass police station - Torugart Pass border checkpoint

=== Kyrgyzstan ===
- ЭМ-11 ЭМ-11 Road: Torugart Pass - Bishkek
- ЭМ-01 ЭМ-01 Road: Bishkek - Georgievka

=== Kazakhstan ===
==== Post 2024 road numbering scheme ====
- KZ08-06 : Kyrgyz border - Korday
- KAZ06 : Korday - Taraz (Bypass) - Shymkent (Northern Bypass) - Kyzylorda
- KAZ06 / KZ11-01 : Kyzylorda Bypass
- KAZ06 : Kyzylorda - Karabutak - Aktobe
- KAZ10 : Aktobe – Oral
- KZ07-06 : Oral – Taskala – Russian border

==== 2011-2024 road numbering scheme ====
- A-2 : Kyrgyz border - Korday - Taraz (Bypass) - Shymkent (Northern Bypass)
- M-32 : Shymkent (Northern Bypass) - Kyzylorda - Karabutak - Aktobe - Oral
- A-29 : Oral – Taskala – Russian border

=== Russia ===
- A 298: border with Kazakhstan - Ozinki – Yershov – Pristannoye – Saratov
- R 22: Saratov - Borisoglebsk
- R 298: Borisoglebsk – Voronezh - Kursk
- M 2: within Kursk
- 38K-010: Kursk – Kurchatov
- 38K-017: Kurchatov – Lgov – Rylsk – border with Ukraine

== Junctions ==
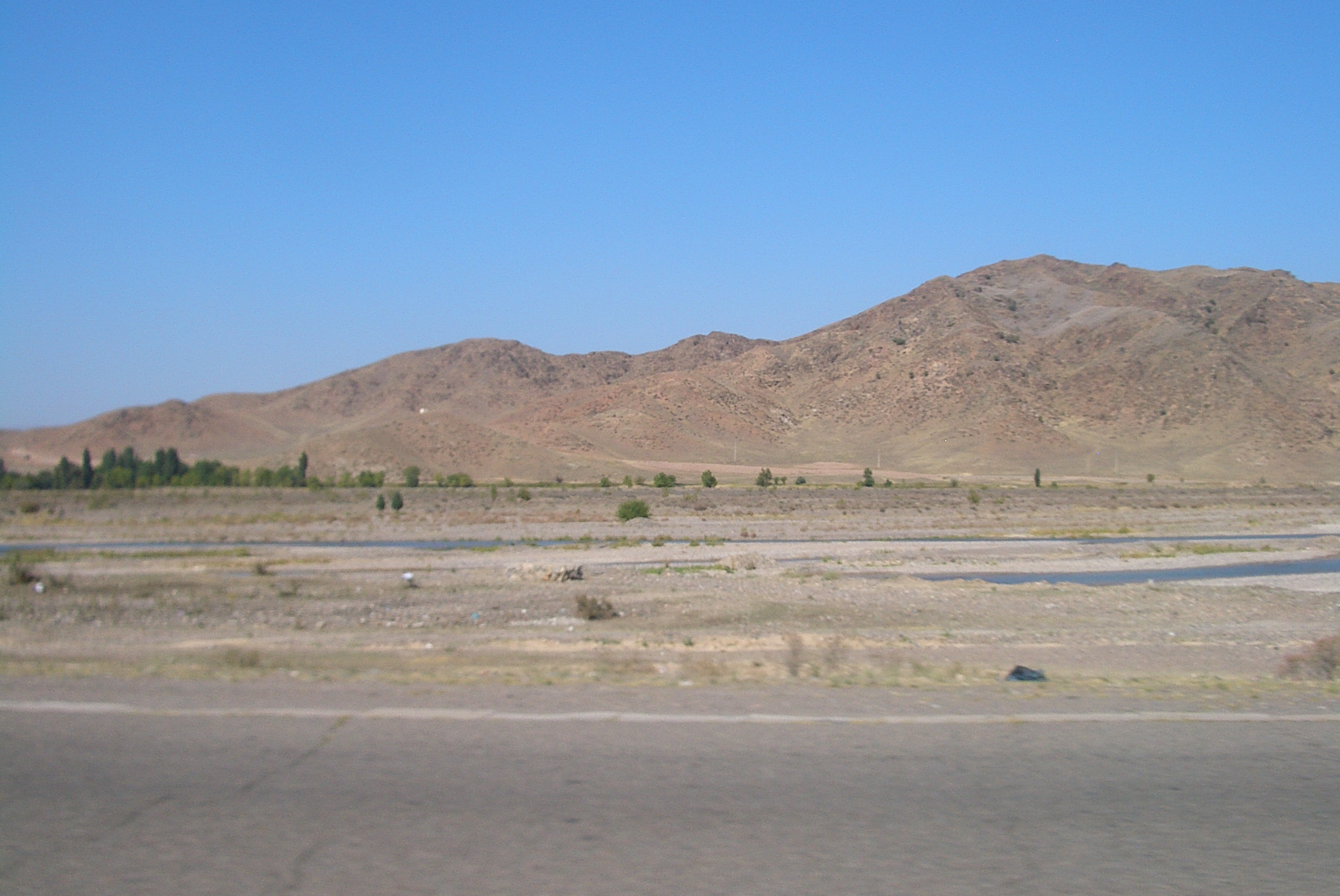
AH61 route in Kyrgyzstan along Chu River. The hills are located in Kazakhstan

=== China ===
- AH4 Kashgar (Kashi)
- AH65 Kashgar

=== Kyrgyzstan ===
- AH5 Bishkek

=== Kazakhstan ===
- AH7 Merke
- AH62 Shymkent
- AH63 Uralsk

=== Russia ===
- AH8 Borisoglebsk

== Gallery ==
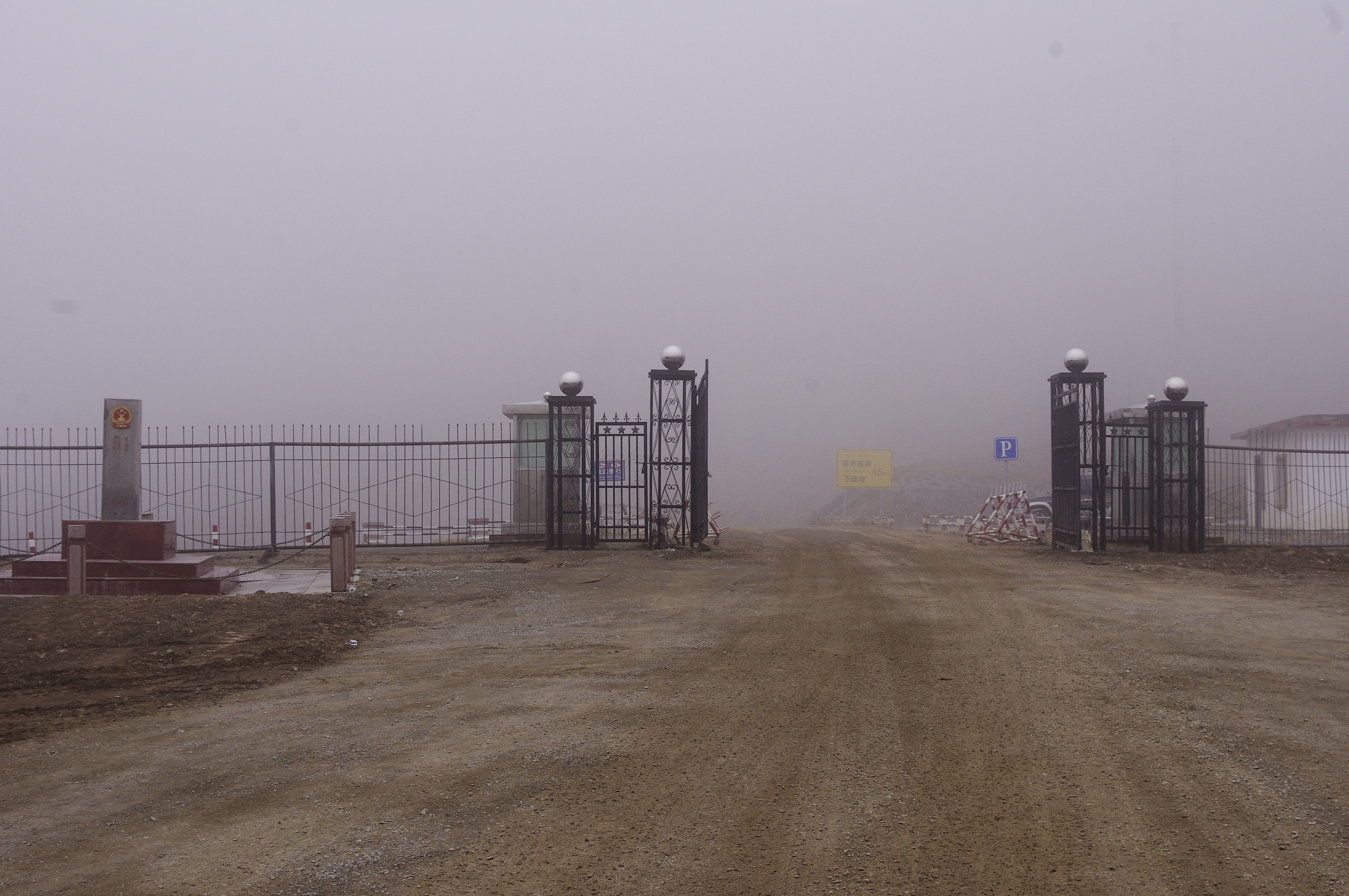
Torugart Pass

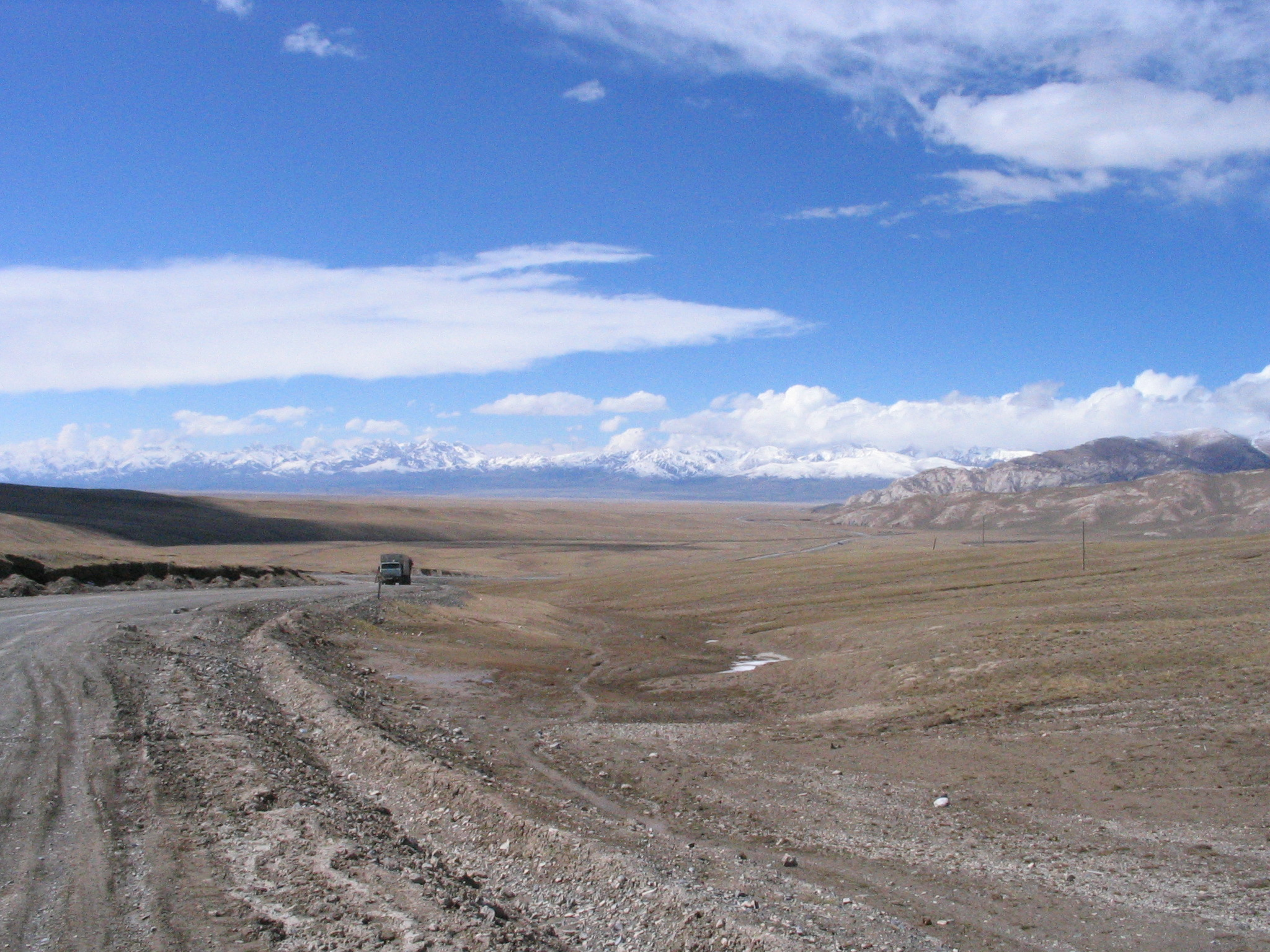
ЭМ-07 Kyrgyzstan

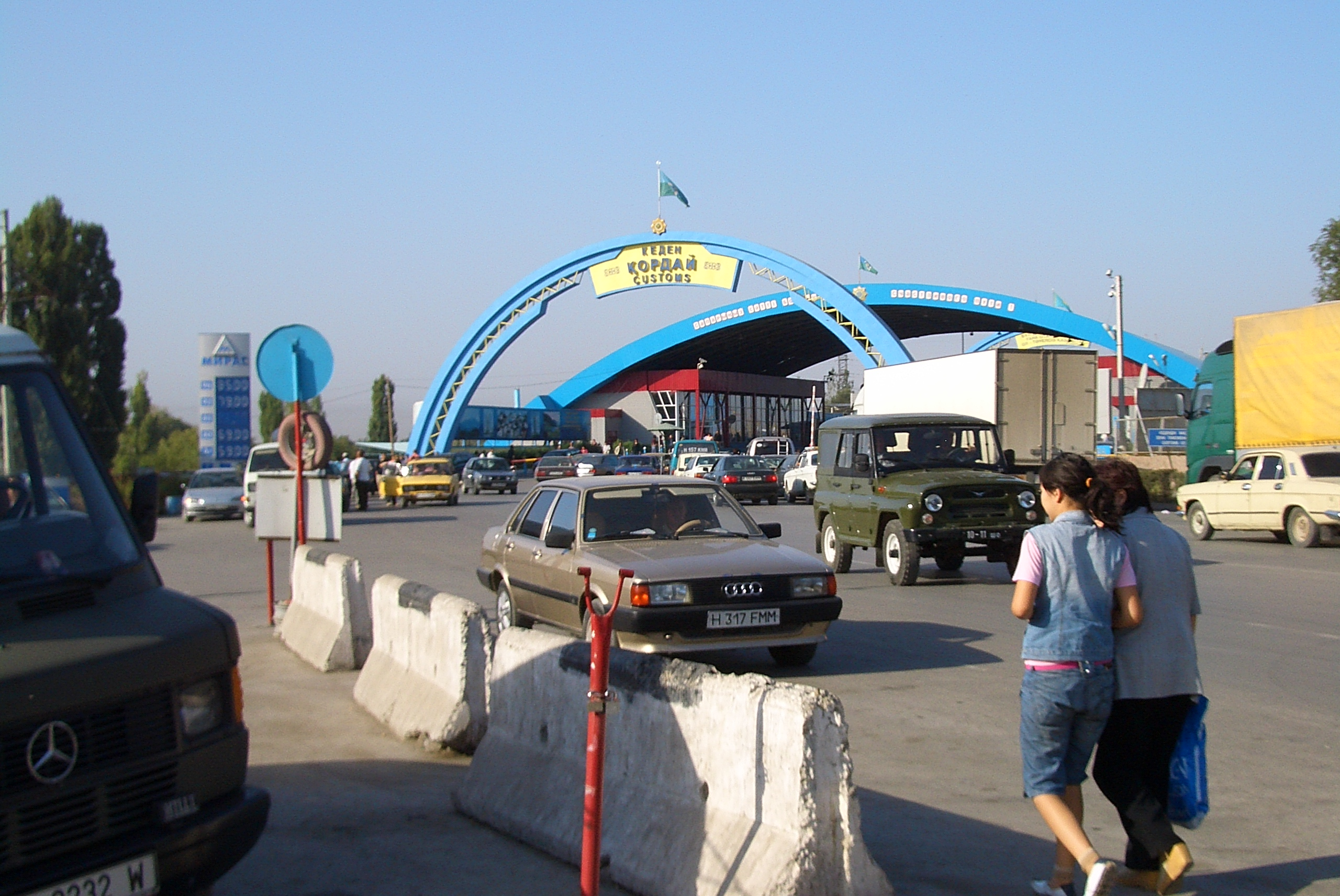
Korday Border

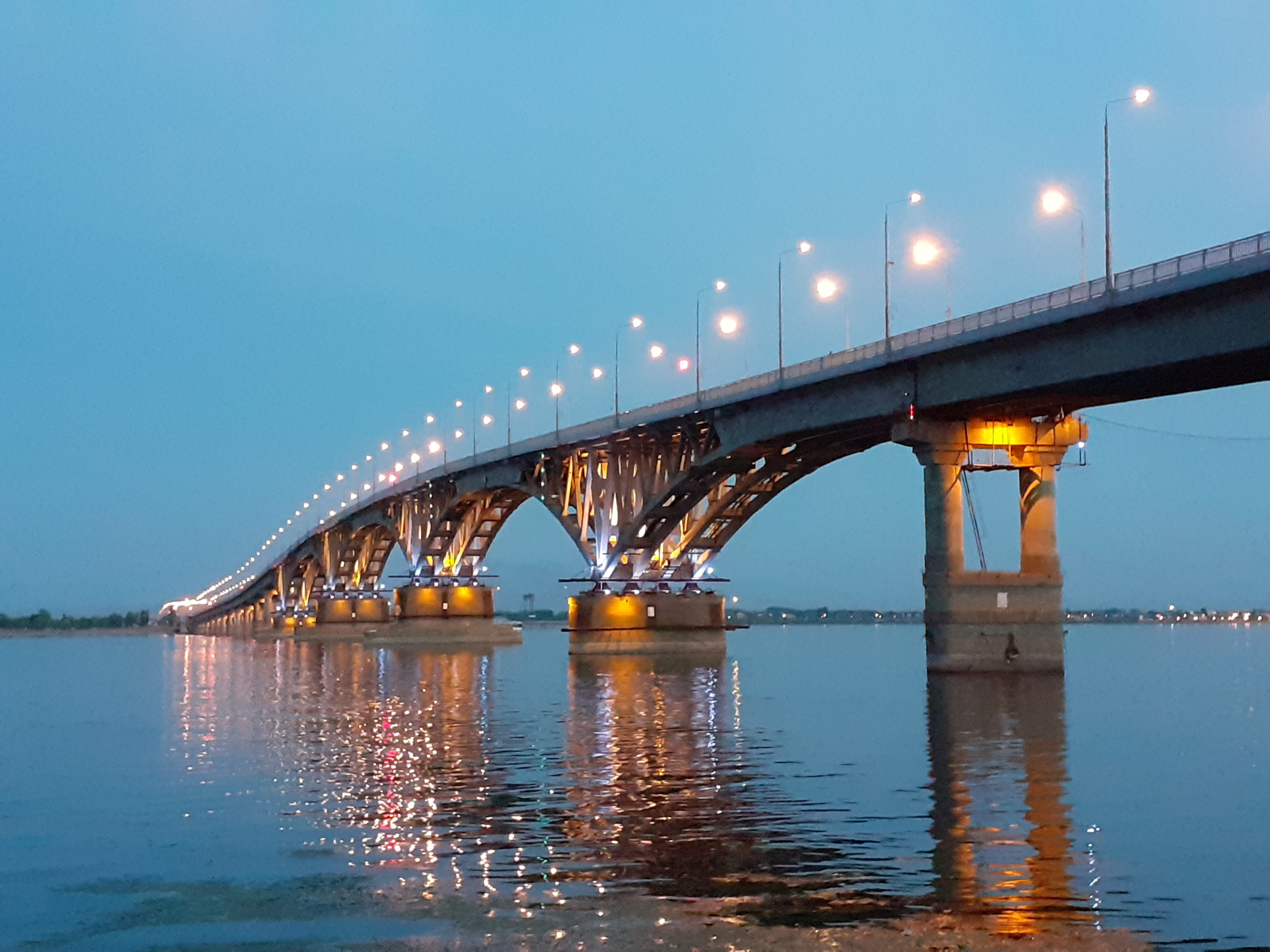
Saratov Bridge across Volga River

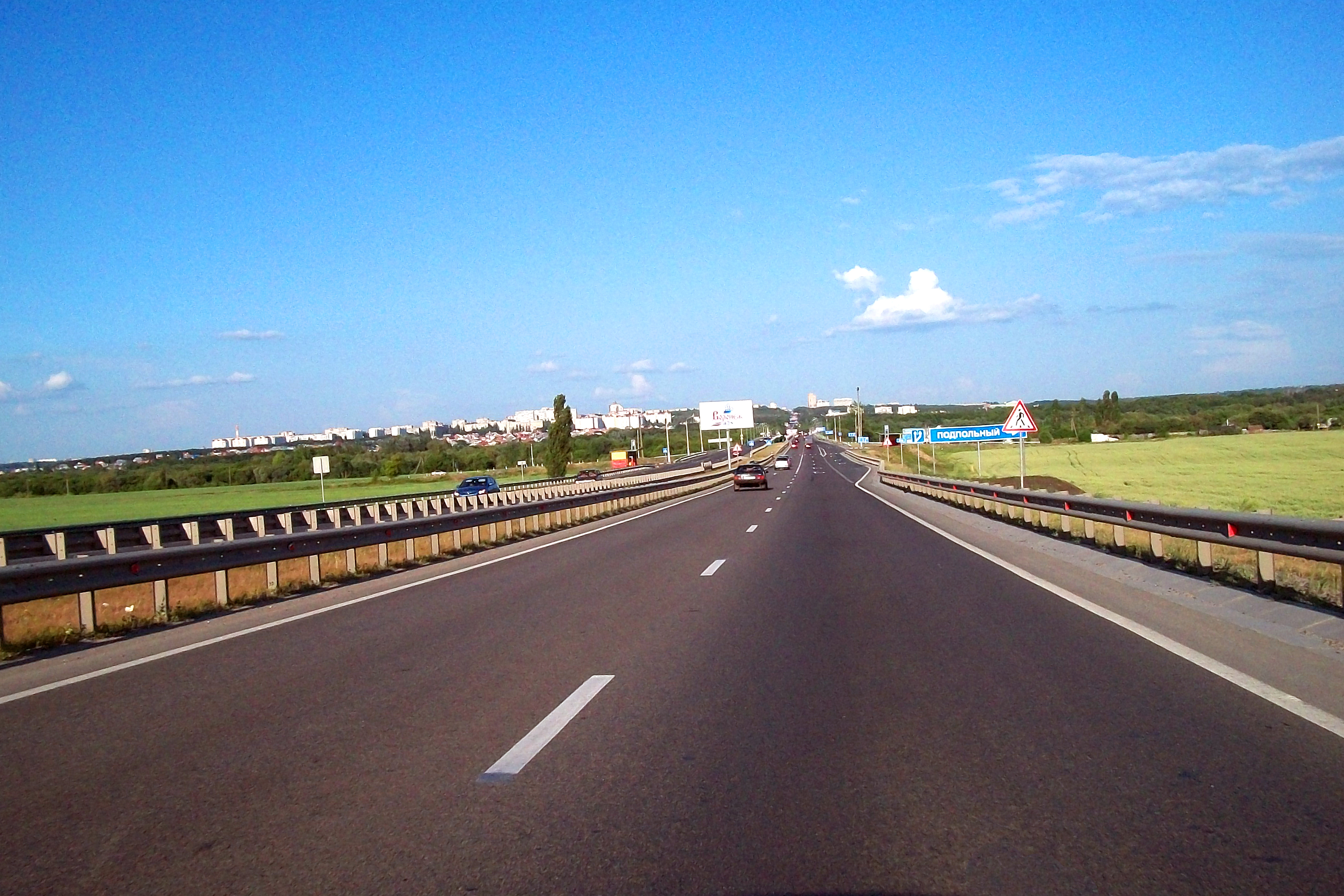
Towards Voronezh

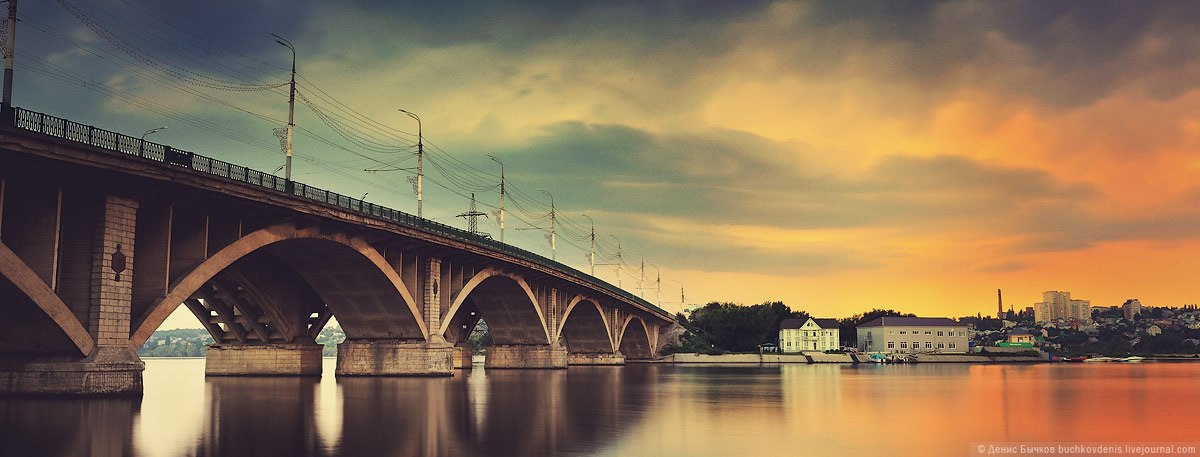
Vograsovsky bridge

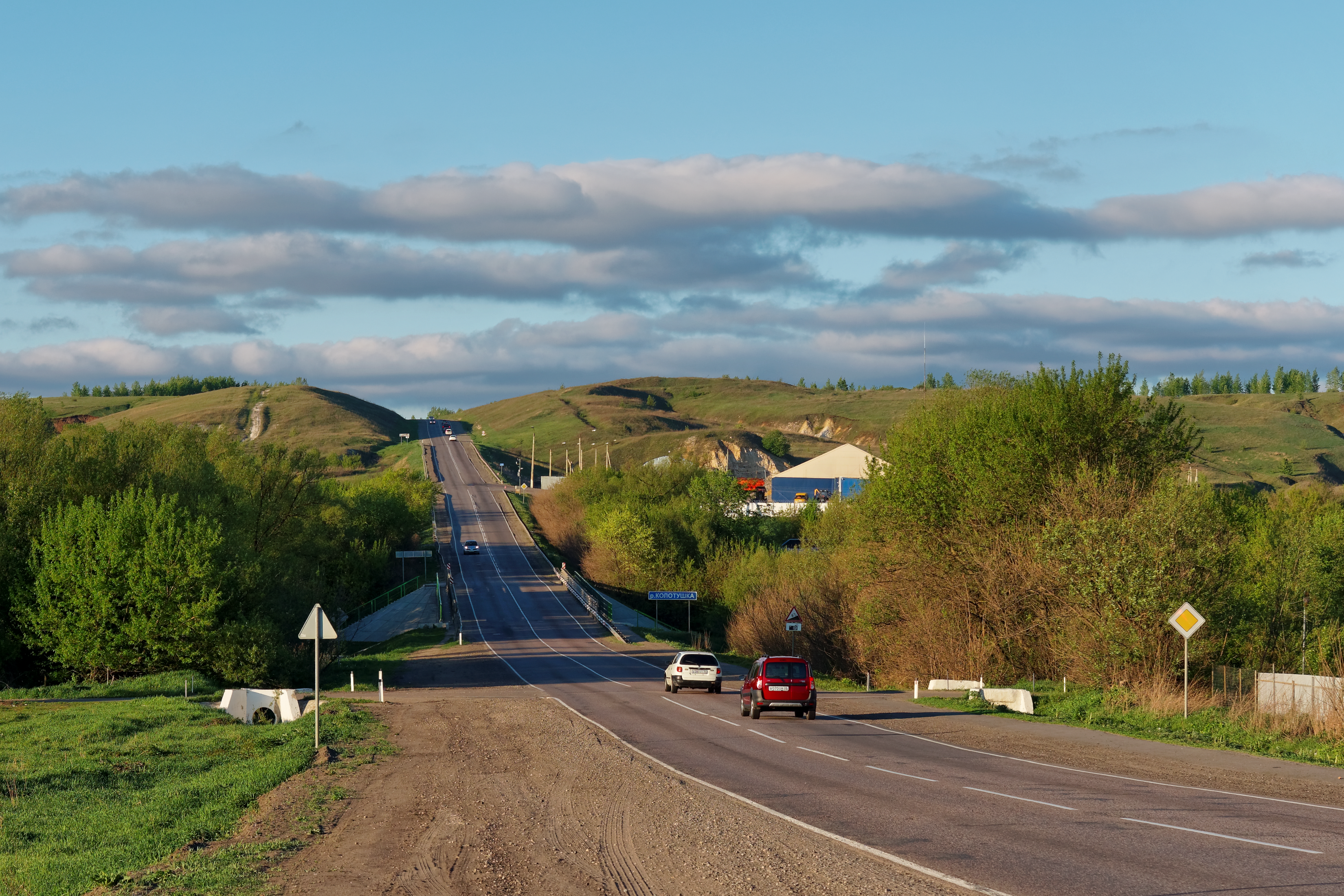
Voronezh Oblast

== See also ==
- Asian Highway 60
- List of Asian Highways
