= AH70 =

Road in Asia

Asian Highway 70
- Map of AH70 in red

Route information
- Length: 4,832 km (3,002 mi)

Major junctions
- North end: Border between Ukraine and Russia
- South end: Bandar Abbas, Iran

Location
- Countries: Russia; Kazakhstan; Turkmenistan; Iran

Highway system
- Asian Highway Network
| ← AH68 | → AH71 |

Asian Highway 70 (AH70) is a road in the Asian Highway Network running 4,655 kilometres (2,892 mi) from Donetsk, Russia (near the Ukrainian border) to Bandarabbas, Iran. The route is as follows:

== Russia ==
- R260: border with Ukraine (de facto under LNR control) - Kamensk-Shakhtinsky - Volgograd
- R 22: Volgograd - Astrakhan
- 12A-235: Astrakhan - Krasny Yar - border with Kazakhstan

== Kazakhstan ==
=== Post 2024 road numbering scheme ===
- KAZ09 : Russian border - Kurmangazy - Atyrau - Dossor
- KAZ11 : Dossor – Kulsary – Beyneu – Say-Otes – Shetpe – Zhetibay
- KZ12-03 : Zhetibay – Zhanaozen - Turkmen international border

=== 2011-2024 road numbering scheme ===
- A-27 : Russian border - Kurmangazy -Atyrau - Dossor
- A-33 : Dossor – Kulsary – Beyneu – Say-Otes – Shetpe – Zhetibay
- A-34 : Zhetibay – Zhanaozen - Turkmen international border

== Turkmenistan ==
- P-18 Garabogaz - Türkmenbaşy
- M-37 Türkmenbaşy - Gyzylarbat
- P-15 Gyzylarbat - Garrygala - Incheh Borun

== Iran ==
- Road 73: Incheh Borun - Gorgan
- Road 22: Gorgan - Sari
- Road 81: Sari - Damghan - Robat-e Posht-e Badam
- Road 68: Robat-e Posht-e Badam - Yazd
- Road 71: Yazd - Anar - Bandarabbas
