= Alma-Arasan mineral springs =

Springs in Kazakhstan

- Interactive map of Alma-Arasan mineral springs
- Location: Bostandyq district, Almaty, Kazakhstan
- Coordinates: 43.0829°N 76.9064°E
- Temperature: 33–38 °C (91–100 °F)

Alma-Arasan mineral springs (Russian: Алма-арасанские минеральные источники, romanized: Alma-arasanskije mineraljnije istočniki) are located in the village of Alma-Arasan in southern Bostandyq, Almaty, Kazakhstan.

== History ==
Alma-Arasan mineral springs were discovered in 1931 on the slopes of the Passage River.

Five wells were drilled from 1951 to 1953 and their water production is 520 to 525 m^{3}/d (137,000 to 139,000 US gal/d).

In November 2019, repair and renovation work was completed to improve the spring area. New stairs and a walkout playground were built. Three small swimming pools were installed. Two of them are filled with warm mineral water, one is from the river. A small house is used for swimming in the wintertime and protection from wind and rain.

== Description ==
In terms of composition and therapeutic properties springs refer to the siliceous thermal waters. Average water temperature is 33 to 38 °C (91 to 100 °F), mineralization is 0.3 g/L. According to the chemical composition water belongs to the sulfate-hydrocarbonate-sodium type. The water contains biologically active components (mg/L): silicon dioxide (40-75), fluorine (3.6-6), hydrogen sulfide (0.58), radon (9-13 eman).
