= Mukur =

Mukur may refer to:

- Mukur, Kazakhstan
- Mukur, Kyrgyzstan
- Muqur, Ghazni in Afghanistan
- Mukura, Odia-language magazine
