= AH51 =

Asian Highway in Pakistan

Asian Highway 51

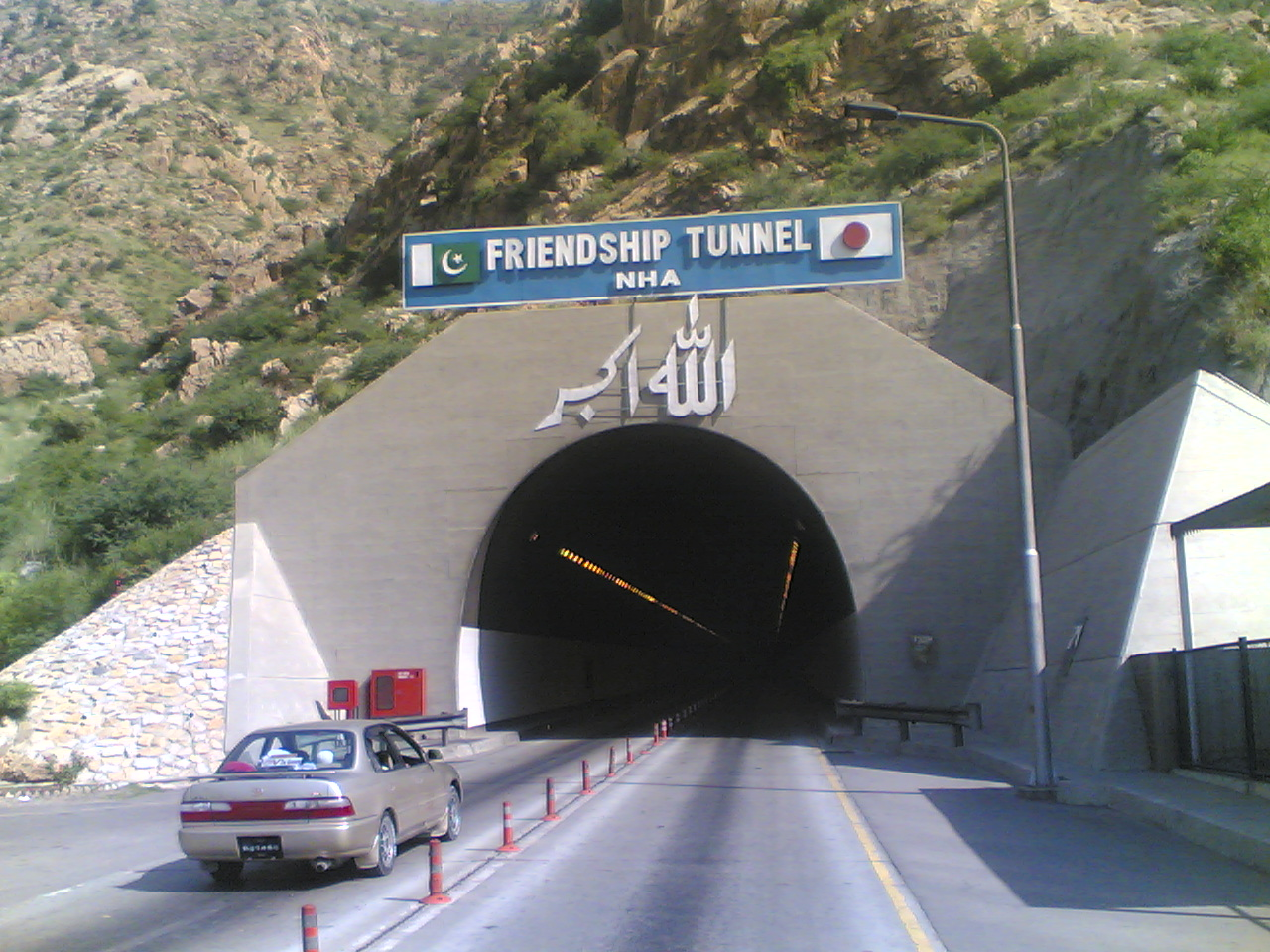
- Kohat Tunnel on AH51

Route information
- Length: 825 km (513 mi)

Major junctions
- North end: Peshawar, Khyber Pakhtunkhwa Province
- South end: Quetta, Balochistan Province

Location
- Countries: Pakistan

Highway system
- Asian Highway Network
← AH48	→ AH60

Asian Highway 51 or AH51 is a route located entirely in Pakistan, running 825 kilometres (513 mi) from Peshawar, Khyber Pakhtunkhwa Province to Quetta, Balochistan Province.

== Route ==
- N-55 Peshawar - Dera Ismail Khan : 297 km (185 mi)
- N-50 Dera Ismail Khan - Quetta : 528 km (328 mi)

== Junctions ==
AH1 near Peshawar
AH7 near Quetta

== See also ==
- Asian Highway 1
- List of Asian Highways
