= E121 =

E121 may refer to:

- European route E121
- Citrus Red 2, a food dye, sometimes used in the United States to color the skin of oranges
- Unbiunium, a hypothetical element
