= Kenel =

Kenel is a surname. Notable people with the surname include:

- Sandra Kenel (born 1973), Swiss fencer
- Vasily Kenel (1834–1893), Russian architect

== See also ==
- Kenel, South Dakota
- Kenen
