= AH7 =

International Highway route in Asia

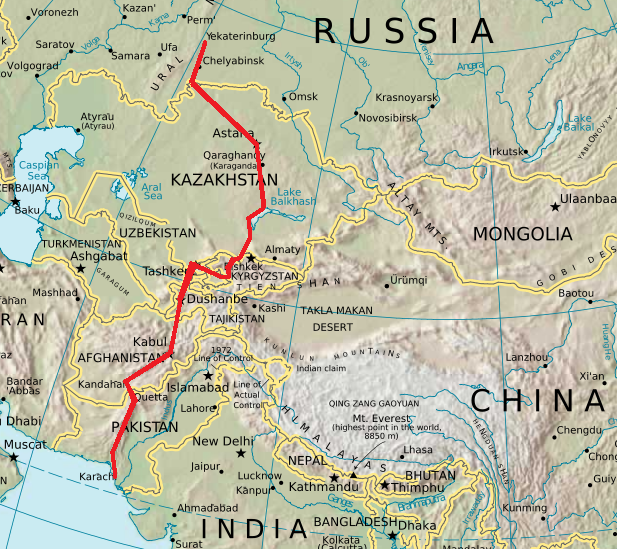

Route information
- Length: 5,868 km (3,646 mi)

Major junctions
- North end: Yekaterinburg, Russia
- South end: Karachi, Pakistan

Location
- Countries: Russia, Kazakhstan, Kyrgyzstan, Uzbekistan, Tajikistan, Afghanistan, Pakistan

Highway system
- Asian Highway Network

Asian Highway 7 (AH7) is a route in the Asian Highway Network. It runs from Yekaterinburg, Russia to Karachi, Pakistan. All together, it is 5,868 km (3,646 mi) long. It passes from Russia, Kazakhstan, Kyrgyzstan, Uzbekistan, Tajikistan, Afghanistan and Pakistan.

The AH7 shares its route between Merke (Kazakhstan) and Kara-Balta (Kyrgyzstan) about a hundred kilometers along with the AH5. In Kabul (Afghanistan) AH7 stops, but reaches to the city of Kandahar though AH1, where the AH7 resumes its route towards Pakistan.

According to the manual of the Asian Highway Project in 2002 almost the entire route is paved. Only a distance of 72 km in Kyrgyzstan and a piece of 83 kilometers in Tajikistan are unpaved. As of 2017, the entire route in Kyrgyzstan is paved.

In Pakistan AH7 (N25 – Pakistan Road Networks) enters at Chaman. It passes through Qila Abdullah, Quetta, Mastung, Kalat, Khuzdar, Uthal, Goth Hussain and Hub, ending at Karachi. In Pakistan N25 is also called RCD (Regional Cooperation for Development) Highway. Maintained by National Highway Authority.

== Associated Routes ==
=== Russia ===
- M 5: Yekaterinburg – Chelyabinsk
- A 310: Chelyabinsk – Troitsk – border with Kazakhstan

=== Kazakhstan ===
==== Post 2024 road numbering scheme ====
- KAZ03 : Karaek – Kostanai – Astana
- KZ01-01 : Astana Bypass
- KAZ01 : Astana – Karaganda – Burylbaytal
- KZ08-04 : Burubaytal – Shu – Merke
- KZ08-07 : Merke – Chaldovar

==== 2011-2024 road numbering scheme ====
- M-36 : Karaek – Kostanai – Astana – Karaganda – Burubaytal
- P-29 : Burubaytal – Shu – Merke
- M-39 : Merke – Chaldovar

=== Kyrgyzstan ===
- ЭМ-03 ЭМ-03 Road: Chaldovar – Kara-Balta
- ЭМ-04 ЭМ-04 Road: Kara-Balta – Osh
- ЭМ-15 ЭМ-15 Road: Osh – Border of Uzbekistan

=== Uzbekistan ===
- A373 : Border with Kyrgyzstan – Andijon – Angren – Ohangaron – Tashkent
- M39 : Tashkent – Chinoz – Sirdaryo
- M34 : Sirdaryo – Xovos

=== Tajikistan ===
- РБ15 РБ15 Road: Khavast – Zarafshon – Istaravshan
- РБ01 РБ01 Road : Istaravshan – Dushanbe
- РБ09 РБ09 Road : Dushanbe – Qizilqala – Bokhtar – Panji Poyon

=== Afghanistan ===
- NH97 : Shirkhan – Pol-e Khomri
- NH0104 Ring Highway: Pol-e Khomri – Jabal Saraj – Kabul
- NH0101 Ring Highway: Kabul – Kandahar
- NH37 : Kandahar – Spin Boldak

=== Pakistan ===
- Chaman – Quetta – Kalat – Karachi

== See also ==
- List of Asian Highways
- International E-road network
- Trans-African Highway network
