= AH62 =

International Highway route in Asia

Asian Highway 62

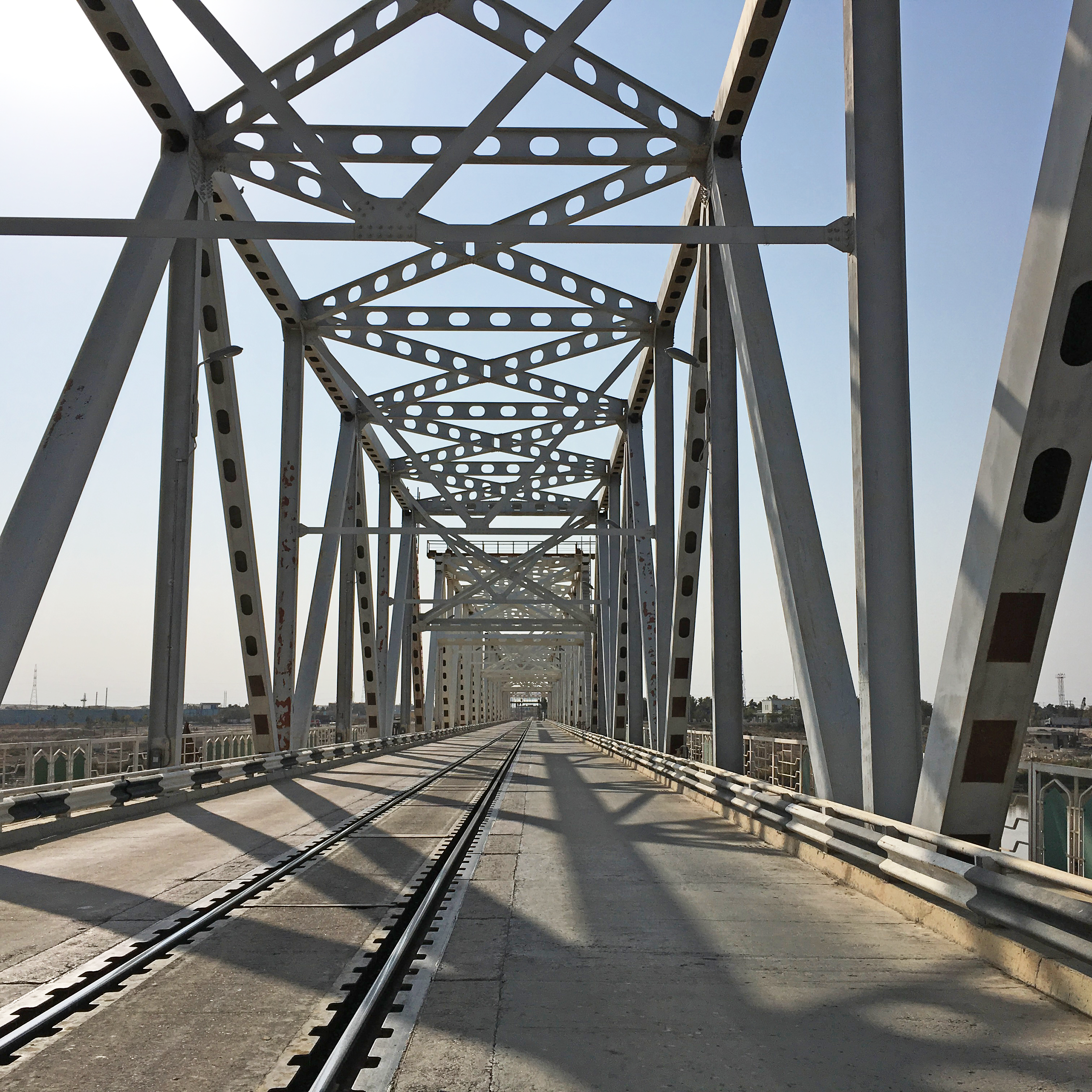
- The friendship bridge across river Amu Darya, Afghanistan

Route information
- Length: 2,722 km (1,691 mi)

Major junctions
- North end: Petropavlovsk, Kazakhstan
- South end: Mazar-i-Sharif, Afghanistan

Location
- Countries: Kazakhstan; Uzbekistan; Afghanistan

Highway system
- Asian Highway Network
← AH61	→ AH63

Asian Highway 62 (AH62) is an international route running 2,105 kilometres (1,308 mi) from Petropavlovsk in Kazakhstan to Mazar-i-Sharif in Afghanistan. This international highway transits Uzbekistan also.

== Route ==
Petropavlovsk – Arkalyk – Zhezkazgan – Kyzylorda – Shymkent – Zhibek Zholy – Chernyavka – Tashkent – Syrdaria – Samarkand – Guzar – Termez – Hairatan – Mazar-i-Sharif.

== Associated routes ==
=== Kazakhstan ===
==== Post 2024 road numbering scheme ====
- KAZ13 : Petropavl - Arkalyk - Jezkazgan
- KAZ14 : Jezkazgan - Kyzylorda
- KAZ06 / KZ11-01 : Kyzylorda Bypass
- KAZ06 : Kyzylorda - Shymkent
- KZ13-03 : Shymkent - Kazygurt - Zhibek Zholy - Uzbek border

==== 2011-2024 road numbering scheme ====
- A-16 : Petropavl - Arkalyk - Jezkazgan
- A-17 : Jezkazgan - Kyzylorda
- M-32 : Kyzylorda - Shymkent
- A-2 : Shymkent - Kazygurt - Zhibek Zholy - Uzbek border

==== Pre-2011 (Soviet) numbering scheme ====
- A-342 : Petropavl - Arkalyk - Jezkazgan
- A-344 : Jezkazgan - Kyzylorda
- M-32 : Kyzylorda - Shymkent
- M-39 : Shymkent - Kazygurt - Zhibek Zholy - Uzbek border

=== Uzbekistan ===
- M39 : Kazakh border — Gʻishtkoʻprik — Toshkent
- D001 : Toshkent Ring Road
- M39 : Toshkent — Chinoz — Jizzax — Samarqand — Shahrisabz — Gʻuzor — Termiz
- M39a : Termiz Bypass — Hayraton — Afghan border

=== Afghanistan ===
- NH89 Hairatan Highway: Hairatan - Mazar-i-Sharif : 120 km (75 mi).

== See also ==
- Asian Highway 60
- List of Asian Highways
