= European route E015 =

Road in trans-European E-road network

E015

Route information
- Length: 280 km (170 mi)

Major junctions
- From: Taskesken
- To: Bakhty

Location
- Countries: Kazakhstan

Highway system
- International E-road network; A Class; B Class

E 015 is a European B class road in Kazakhstan, connecting the cities Taskesken - Bakhty.

== Route ==
- Kazakhstan
  - Taskesken
  - Bakhty
