= AH60 =

Asian Highway route in Russia and Kazakhstan

Asian Highway 60
- Map of AH60 in red

Route information
- Length: 2,105 km (1,308 mi)

Major junctions
- North end: Omsk, Omsk Oblast, Russia
- South end: Burubaytal, Kazakhstan

Location
- Countries: Russia; Kazakhstan

Highway system
- Asian Highway Network
← AH51	→ AH61

Asian Highway 60 (AH60) is an international route running 2,105 kilometres (1,308 mi) from Omsk, Omsk Oblast, in Russia to Burubaytal, Jambyl Region, in Kazakhstan. About 177 km (110 mi) of route is located in Russia and 1,928 km (1,198 mi) is located in Kazakhstan.

== Route ==
Omsk - Cherlak - (Russia–Kazakhstan border) – Pnirtyshskoe – Pavlodar – Semipalatinsk – Georgievka – Taskesken – Ucharal – Almaty – Kaskelen – Burubaytal

== Associated routes ==
=== Russia ===
- A 320: Omsk – Cherlak – border with Kazakhstan 177 km (110 mi). This section of route AH60 runs concurrently with European route E127.

=== Kazakhstan ===
==== Post 2024 road numbering scheme ====
- KAZ07 : Russian border - Pavlodar - Semey - Kalbatau
- KAZ08 : Kalbatau - Ayagoz - Taskesken - Sarkand - Usharal - Taldykorgan - Almaty
- KAZ01 : Almaty – Burylbaytal

==== 2011-2024 road numbering scheme ====
- M-38 : Russian border - Pavlodar - Semey - Kalbatau
- A-3 : Kalbatau - Ayagoz - Taskesken - Sarkand - Usharal - Taldykorgan - Almaty
- M-36 : Almaty – Burylbaytal

== Junctions ==
Russia
AH6 Omsk
Kazakhstan
AH64 Pavlodar
AH67 Taskesken
AH68 Ucharal
AH5 Almaty
AH7 Burubaital

== See also ==
- Asian Highway 6
- Asian Highway 7
- List of Asian Highways
