= Bayserka =

- Location in Kazakhstan
- Coordinates: 43°23′01″N 77°6′32″E
- Country: Kazakhstan
- Region: Almaty Region
- Time zone: UTC+6 (Omsk Time)

Bayserka is a village in Almaty Region of south-eastern Kazakhstan.
