= Shirkhan-e Tang Sepu =

Shirkhan-e Tang Sepu شيرخان تنگ سپو
- Village
- Country: Iran
- Province: Kohgiluyeh and Boyer-Ahmad
- County: Kohgiluyeh
- Bakhsh: Central
- Rural District: Dehdasht-e Sharqi

Population (2006)
  - Total: 45
- Time zone: UTC+3:30 (IRST)
  - Summer (DST): UTC+4:30 (IRDT)

Shirkhan-e Tang Sepu (Persian: شيرخان تنگ سپو, also Romanized as Shīrkhān-e Tang Sepū) is a village in Dehdasht-e Sharqi Rural District, in the Central District of Kohgiluyeh County, Kohgiluyeh and Boyer-Ahmad Province, Iran. At the 2006 census, its population was 45, in 6 families.
