= Atameken (Pavlodar Region) =

Atameken Атамекен (Kazakh)
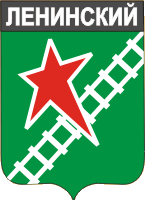
- Coat of arms

- Location in Kazakhstan
- Coordinates: 52°15′10″N 76°46′44″E
- Country: Kazakhstan
- Region: Pavlodar Region
- Settled: 1914

Population
  - Estimate (2019): 9,982
- Time zone: UTC+6 (FET)
- Postal code: 140015
- Area code: +375 (0)1641
- License plate: 1

Atameken (Kazakh and Russian: Атамекен) is a rural settlement in the Pavlodar Region of Kazakhstan. It is subordinate to the Pavlodar Municipality. Its KATO code is 551045100.

== Name ==
The settlement was named as Lenin (Kazakh: Ленин) or Leninsky (Russian: Ленинский) before 2023.

== Geographic location ==
Atameken is located 12 km west of Pavlodar.

== History ==
It was founded in the beginning in 1914 in the tract Bidaik, as an administrative aul behind No. 7.

From 1938 to 1968, it was subordinate to Yermakovsky district (town Yermak). In the 1930s, the Lenin Machine-Tractor Station was founded here, which operated until 1957.

In 1965, the settlement got township status and was named Leninsky.

From 1973 to 1999 it was subordinate to Ilyichevsk district council (akimat). It is currently located in the rural area of Pavlodar.

== Population ==
In 1999, the population of the village was 8,072 people (3,906 men and 4,166 women). According to the 2009 census, there were 8,619 people (4,225 men and 4,394 women) in the village.

At the beginning of 2019, the population of the settlement was 9,982 (4,920 men and 5,062 women).

== Transport ==
Bus route № 38 (terminal point - Pavlodar Railway Station)

== Economy ==
- Rubikom LLP Meat-Processing Plant
- Zholkuduk Elevator LLP
- JSC MK Eurasia-Agro

== Culture ==
Leninsky has a house of culture named after Zhayau Musa, two libraries, a sports school for judo "Batyr", playgrounds and a sports stadium.

== Health Care ==
Leninsky has a physician's outpatient clinic and three pharmacies.

== Notable people ==
Musician Scriptonite (Adil Jalelov) grew up in Leninsky.
