= Akshatau =

Akshatau Акшатау Ақшатау اقشاتاۋ
- Location within Kazakhstan
- Coordinates: 49°20′27″N 54°33′22″E
- Country: Kazakhstan
- Region: Aktobe
- Elevation: 73 m (240 ft)
- Time zone: UTC+5 (West Kazakhstan Time)
  - Summer (DST): UTC+5 (West Kazakhstan Time)

Akshatau (also known as Aqshatau (Kazakh: Ақшатау, Aqşatau, اقشاتاۋ; Russian: Акшатау, Akshatau)) is a town in Aktobe Region, west Kazakhstan. It lies at an altitude of 73 m (240 ft).
