= AH64 (highway) =

Road in Asia

Asian Highway 64 (AH64) is a road in the Asian Highway Network running 1666 km (1041 miles) from Petropavl, Kazakhstan to Barnaul, Russia connecting AH6 and AH62 to AH4. The route is as follows:

== Kazakhstan ==
=== Post 2024 road numbering scheme ===
- KAZ02 : Petropavl - Kokshetau - Astana
- KZ01-01 : Astana Bypass
- KAZ04 : Astana – Shiderti – Pavlodar
- KAZ07 : Pavlodar - Semey
- KZ18-02 : Semey - Auil - Russian border

=== 2011-2024 road numbering scheme ===
- A-1 : Petropavl - Kokshetau - Astana
- P-10 : Astana Bypass
- P-4 : Astana - Shiderti
- A-17 : Shiderti - Pavlodar
- M-38 : Pavlodar - Semey
- A-11 : Semey - Auil - Russian border

== Russia ==
- A 322: border with Kazakhstan - Rubtsovsk - Barnaul
