= Alimbetovka =

Alimbetovka Әлімбет Алимбетовка الىمبەت
- Location within Kazakhstan
- Coordinates: 50°59′34″N 58°25′43″E
- Country: Kazakhstan
- Region: Aktobe
- Elevation: 346 m (1,135 ft)
- Time zone: UTC+5 (West Kazakhstan Time)
  - Summer (DST): UTC+5 (West Kazakhstan Time)

Alimbetovka, also known as Alimbet (Kazakh: Әлімбет, Älımbet, الىمبەت; Russian: Алимбетовка, Alimbetovka) is a town in Aktobe Region, west Kazakhstan. It lies at an altitude of 346 m (1,135 ft). It lies just a few kilometres from the Russian border.
