= AH5 =

East-west route of the Asian Highway Network

Asian Highway 5

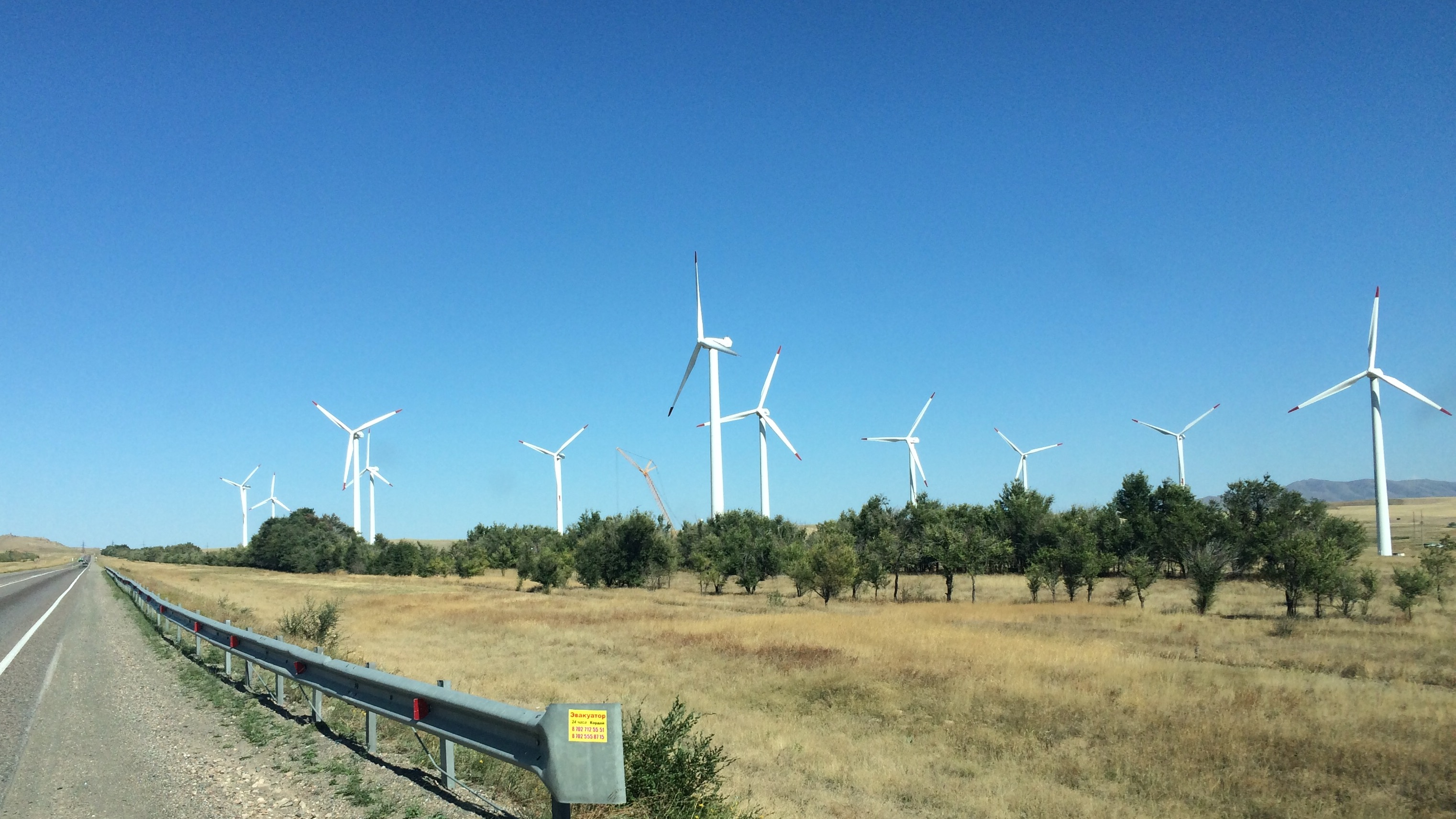
- AH5 in Kazakhstan

Major junctions
- East end: Shanghai, China
- West end: Istanbul, Turkey

Location
- Countries: China, Kazakhstan, Kyrgyzstan, Uzbekistan, Turkmenistan, Azerbaijan, Georgia, Turkey

Highway system
- Asian Highway Network
← AH4	→ AH6

Asian Highway 5 (AH5) is an east-west route of the Asian Highway Network, running 10,380 km (6,450 miles) from Shanghai, China via Kazakhstan, Kyrgyzstan, Uzbekistan, Turkmenistan, Azerbaijan, Georgia to the border between Turkey and Bulgaria west of Istanbul where it connects to AH1 and E80.

== China ==
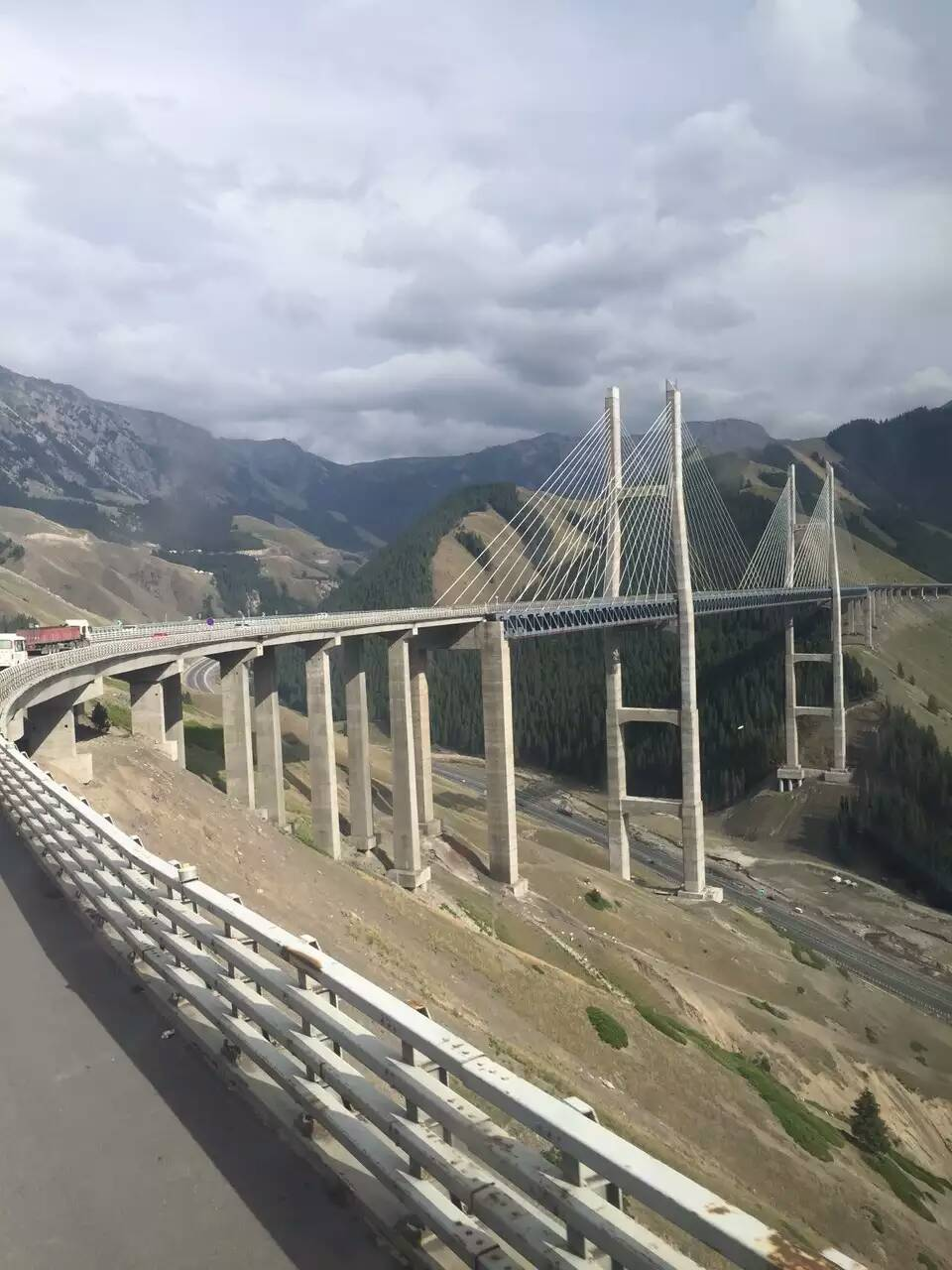
Lianhuo Expressway in China

4,815 km

- G42: Shanghai - Wuxi - Nanjing
- G40: Nanjing - Hefei - Lu'an - Huangchuan - Xinyang - Nanyang - Xixia - Lantian Baqiao - Xi'an
- G30: Xi'an - Baoji - Tianshui - Dingxi - Lanzhou - Wuwei - Zhangye - Jiayuguan - Guazhou - Kumul - Turfan - Turfan - Ürümqi - Kuytun - Khorgas

== Kazakhstan ==
=== Post 2024 road numbering scheme ===
- KAZ06 : Khorgos - Shelek - Almaty - Kaskelen - Kenen - Korday
- KZ08-06 : Korday - Border of Kyrgyzstan

=== 2011-2024 road numbering scheme ===
- A-2 : Khorgos - Koktal - Shonzhy - Almaty - Kaskelen - Kenen
- A-2 (Branch): Kenen - Korday - Border of Kyrgyzstan

== Kyrgyzstan ==
- ЭМ-01 ЭМ-01 Road: Border of Kazakhstan - Bishkek
- ЭМ-02 ЭМ-02 Road: Bishkek Bypass
- ЭМ-04 ЭМ-04 Road: Bishkek - Kara-Balta
- ЭМ-03 ЭМ-03 Road: Kara-Balta - Chaldovar

== Kazakhstan ==
- M 39:Chaldovar - Merke
- A 2: Merke - Taraz - Shymkent - Zhibek Zholy

== Uzbekistan ==
677 km

- M39 : Border of Kazakhstan - G‘ishtko‘prik - Tashkent - Chinoz - Sirdaryo
- M34 : Sirdaryo - Oqoltin
- A373 : Oqoltin - Sardoba
- M39 : Sardoba - Jizzax - Samarkand
- M37 : Samarkand - Navoi - Bukhara - Olot - Border of Turkmenistan

== Turkmenistan ==
1227 km

Farap - Turkmenabat - Mary - Tejen - Ashgabat - Serdar - Turkmenbashi

== Gap ==
- Caspian Sea
- : (Azerbaijan) Port of Baku

== Azerbaijan ==
515 km

- M2 Highway: Baku - Alat - Gazi Mammed - Ganja - Qazax - Qirmizi Korpu

== Georgia ==
489 km

- ს 4: Red Bridge - Rustavi
- ს 9: Rustavi - Tbilisi
- ს 1: Tbilisi - Senaki
- ს 2: Senaki - Poti - Batumi - Sarpi

== Turkey ==
960 km

- D.010: Sarp - Trabzon - Samsun
- D.795: Samsun - Merzifon
- D.100: Merzifon - Gerede
- O-4: Gerede - Istanbul
- O-2: Istanbul
- O-3: Istanbul - Edirne - Kapikule (Bulgaria, A 4 (Maritsa motorway))
