= Zhalanash =

Zhalanash Жаланаш
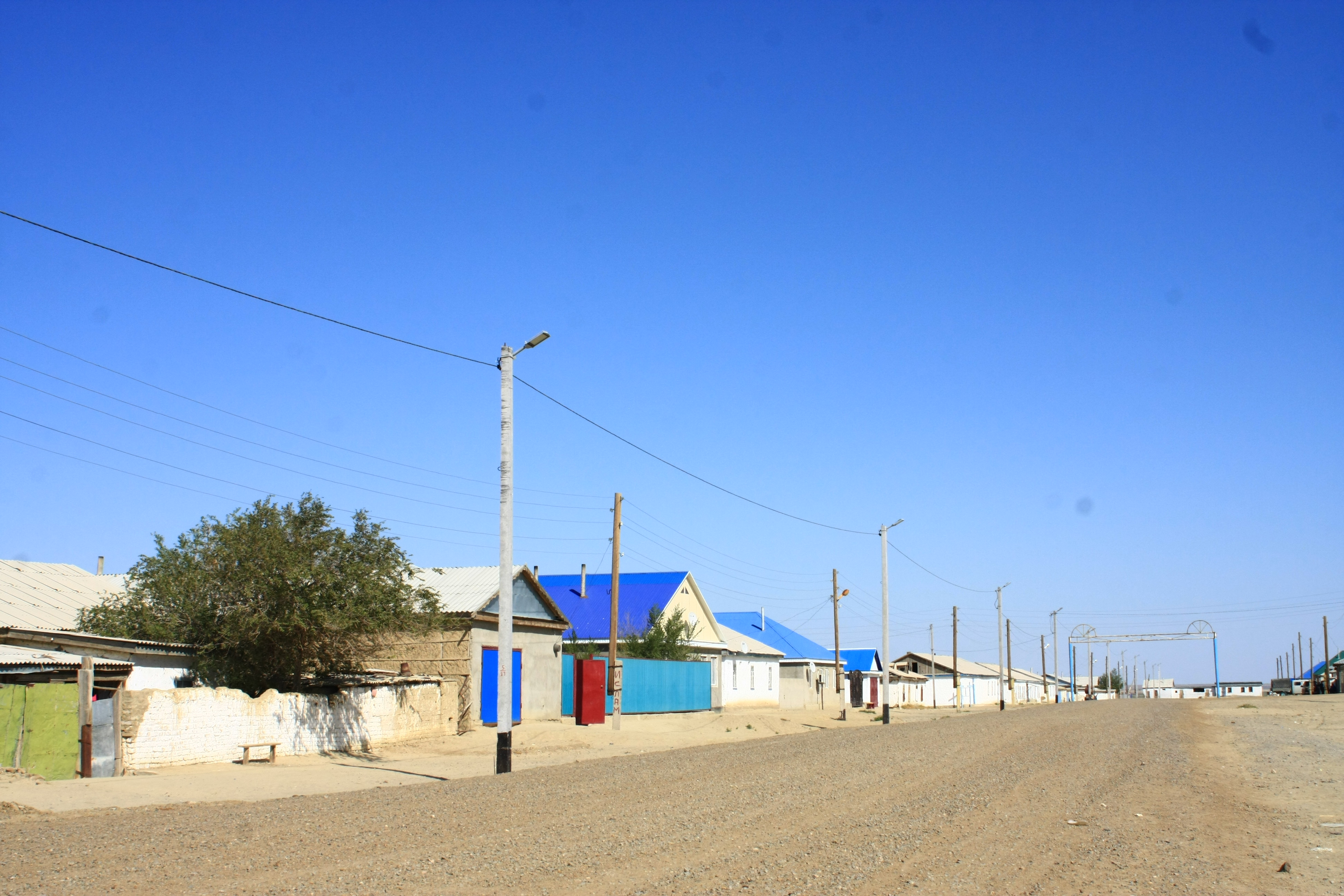

- Location in Kazakhstan
- Coordinates: 46°39′23″N 61°7′38″E
- Country: Kazakhstan
- Region: Kyzylorda Region

Population
  - Total: 700
- Time zone: UTC+6 (ALMT)

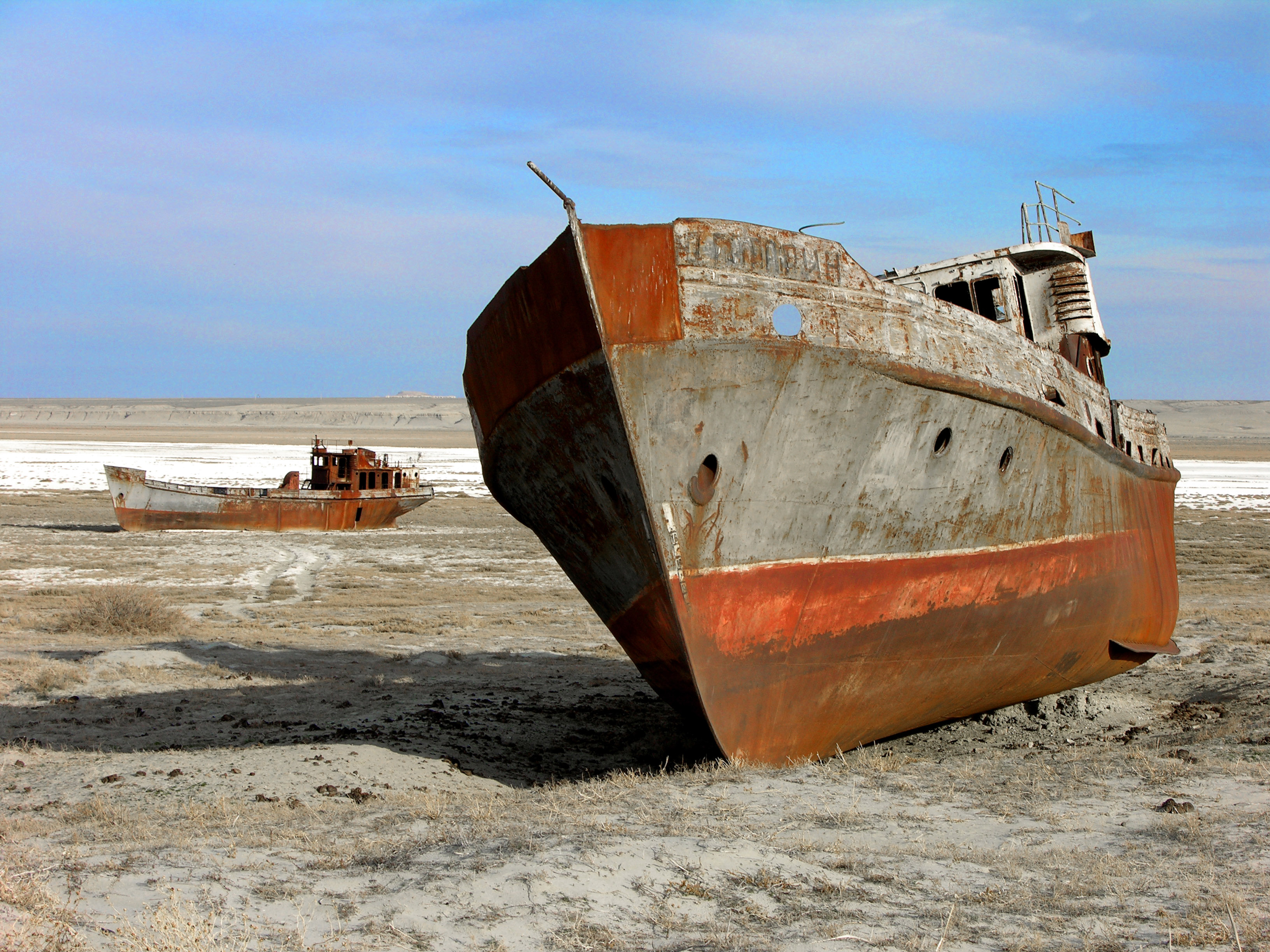
Ships left stranded in the desert in the bay of Zhalanash

Zhalanash (Kazakh: Жаланаш, Jalanaş), is a village in south central Kazakhstan. Previously a fishing village on the Aral Sea, Zhalanash now lies several kilometers from its shores. In recent years, it had become a tourism location for its old harbor, where several ship hulls had been left standing in the desert by the retreating sea. As of 2017, these hulls have been dismantled for scrap metal and only the bottoms remain. The town's economy is focused around camel herding.
