= AH63 =

International Highway Route in Asia

Asian Highway 63 (AH63) is a road in the Asian Highway Network running 2500 km from Samara, Russia to G‘uzor, Uzbekistan connecting AH6 to AH62. The route is also numbered European route E121 and European route E40.

The route is as follows:

== Russia ==
- A 300: Samara - Bolshaya Chernigovka - border with Kazakhstan

== Kazakhstan ==
=== Post 2024 road numbering scheme ===
- KAZ10 : Russian border - Beybitshilik - Oral
- KAZ12 : Oral - Atyrau
- KAZ09 : Atyrau - Dossor
- KAZ11 : Dossor – Kulsary – Beyneu
- KZ12-02 : Beyneu - Akzhigit - Uzbek border

=== 2011-2024 road numbering scheme ===
- M-32 : Russian border - Beybitshilik - Oral
- A-28 : Oral - Atyrau
- A-27 : Russian border - Kurmangazy -Atyrau - Dossor
- A-33 : Dossor – Kulsary – Beyneu
- P-1 : Beyneu - Akzhigit - Uzbek international border

== Uzbekistan ==
- A380 : Kazakh border - Qoʻngʻirot - Xoʻjayli - Nukus - Beruniy - Tuproqqalʼa - Buxoro - Muborak - Qarshi - Gʻuzor
