= Jibek Joly, Saryagash District =

Coordinates: 41.477°N 69.365°E

Zhibek Zholy (Kazakh: Жібек Жолы, until 1990: Chernyaevka, 1990–1993: Poltoratskoye) is a village in Saryagash District, Turkestan Region, Kazakhstan. It lies on the border with Uzbekistan, across from the Uzbek village Gʻishtkoʻprik (Tashkent District). It is on the northern Uzbek-Kazakh frontier, some 50 km from the Uzbek capital of Tashkent.

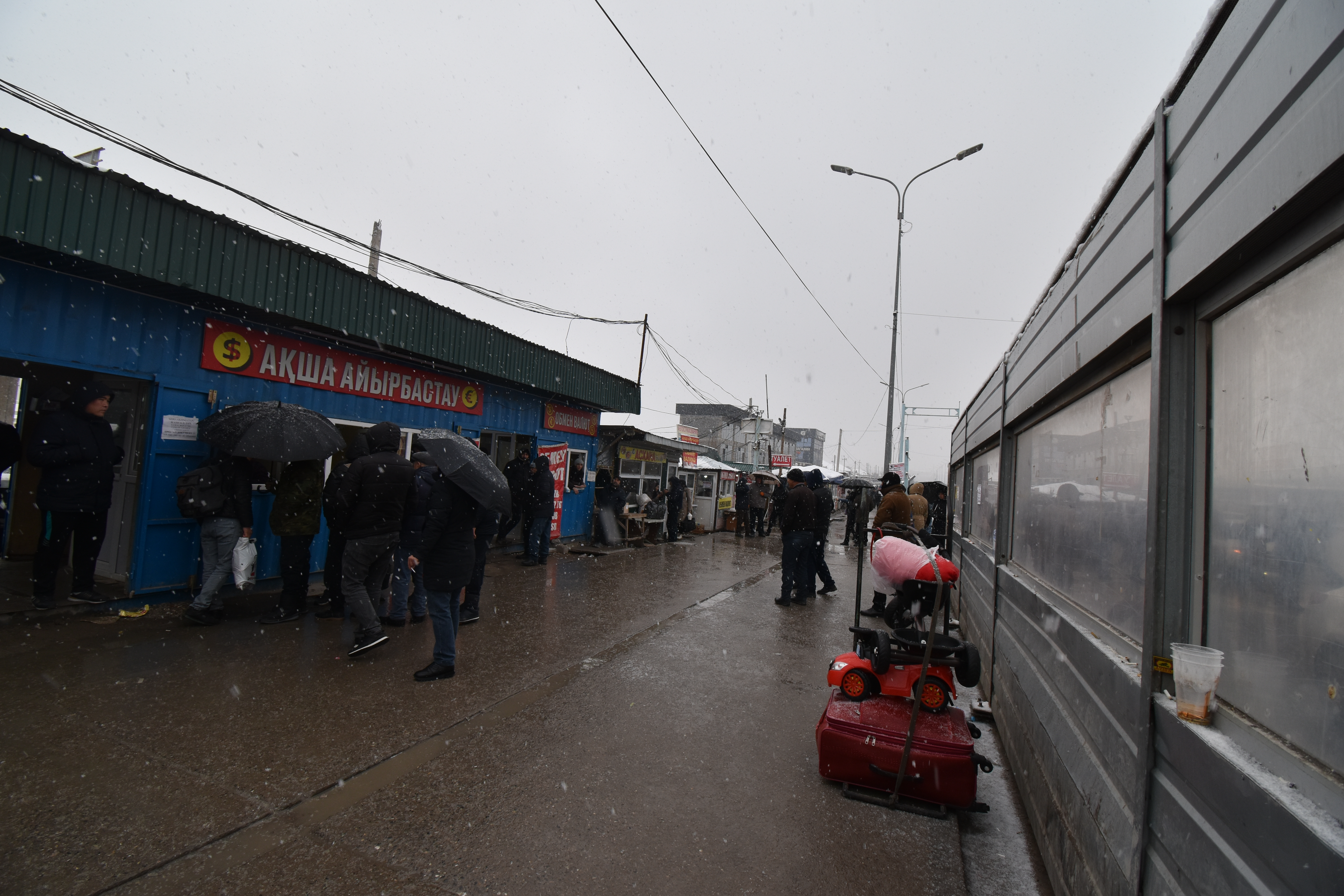
The border crossing in Zhibek Zholy.
