= Alma-Arasan =

Mountain gorge in Almaty, Kazakhstan

Coordinates: 43°5′11″N 76°54′25″E

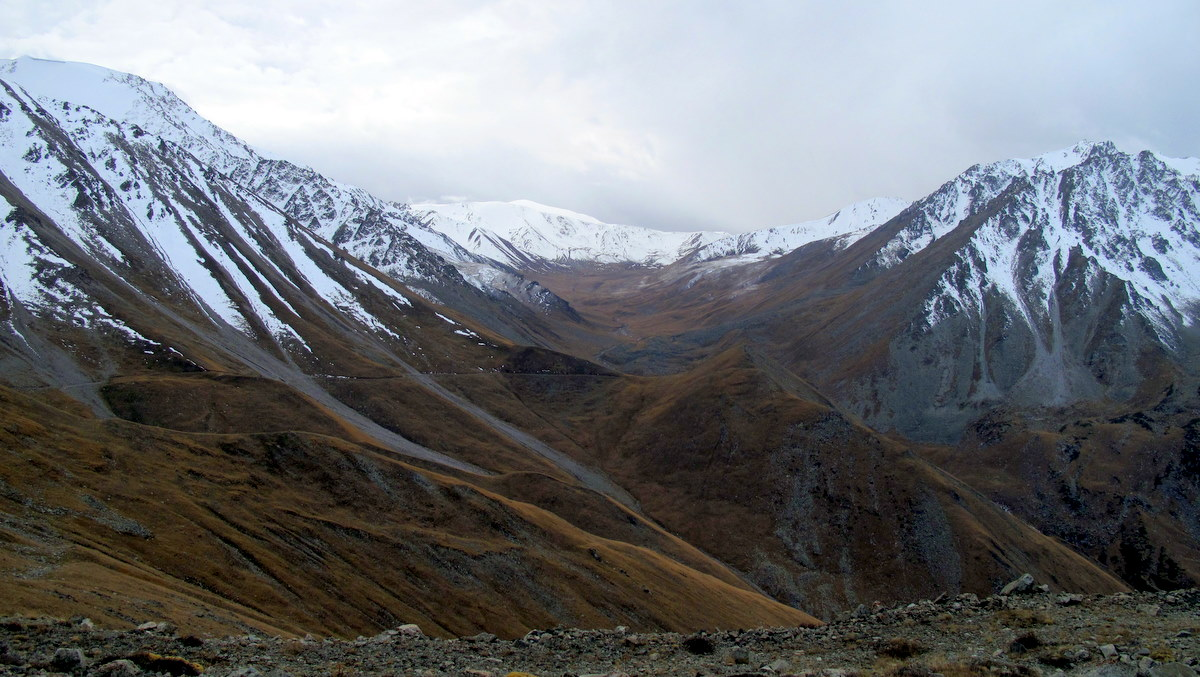
The Alma-Arasan valley in 2009

Alma-Arasan (Kazakh: Алма-Арасан) is a mountain gorge located in the south-west of Almaty. Located at an altitude of 1780 m on the northern slope of the Trans-Ili Alatau. The Prokhodnaya River, a tributary of the Big Almaty, flows along the gorge.

== Description ==
It is characterized by a mountain-meadow landscape and a rugged relief. Granites and granodiorites are widespread. In the vicinity of the gorge, there is a spruce forest, a variety of herbs and shrubs (raspberries, honeysuckle, wild rose, hawthorn). The climate in the gorge is mountainous, there are many cloudless days. The left tributary of the Bolshaya Almatinka, the Prokhodnaya River, flows through the gorge. The well-known Alma-Arasan thermal-radon sulfur springs come to the surface in the gorge. On the slopes of the Prokhodnaya River in 1931, 16 springs were recorded, on the basis of which the balneological resort Alma-Arasan was founded in the same year. In recent years, most of the sources have disappeared.

As of July 2016, the Almarasan gorge is inaccessible from the bottom, the bridge on the trail along the river has been washed away, the trail through the former Almarasan sanatorium is blocked by a private territory guarded by men with machine guns. The private territory stretches for several tens of hectares, is surrounded by a fence and captures the entire area of the slope from the river cliff to the rocks.

== Name ==
The name of the gorge comes from the words of the Kazakh language, which means Alma - an apple and Arasan - a warm spring, since in this mountainous area from ancient times warm springs wedged out to the surface and wild apple trees grew.

== Threat to the environment ==
In the 1990s, the famous Alma-Arasan sanatorium located in the gorge was privatized, through the adjacent territory of which a public tourist route (trail) to Issyk-Kul Lake passed. In 2007, under the pretext of the reconstruction of the sanatorium, areas of the gorge around the sanatorium, including the trail to Issyk-Kul not related to the sanatorium, were blocked (closed) with a high fence with barbed wire and guards were posted. It was reported that in 2010 the reconstruction will be completed, but after the renovation, the sanatorium did not open its doors to visitors and tourists. The public area around the sanatorium is still inaccessible to vacationers and is a closed private recreation area.

In September 2011, the demolition of 26 catering structures in the Alma-Arasan gorge took place by the order of the local government, for them having been built and operated without the required permits.
