= Mukur, Kazakhstan =

Mukur
- Village
- Interactive map of Mukur
- Coordinates: 48°2′26″N 54°29′42″E
- Country: Kazakhstan
- Region: Atyrau Region
- Time zone: UTC+5 (Central Asia Time)

Mukur (Kazakh: Мұқыр, Mūqyr) is a village in the Atyrau Region of western Kazakhstan.
