= Shu, Jambyl =

Shu Шу
- city
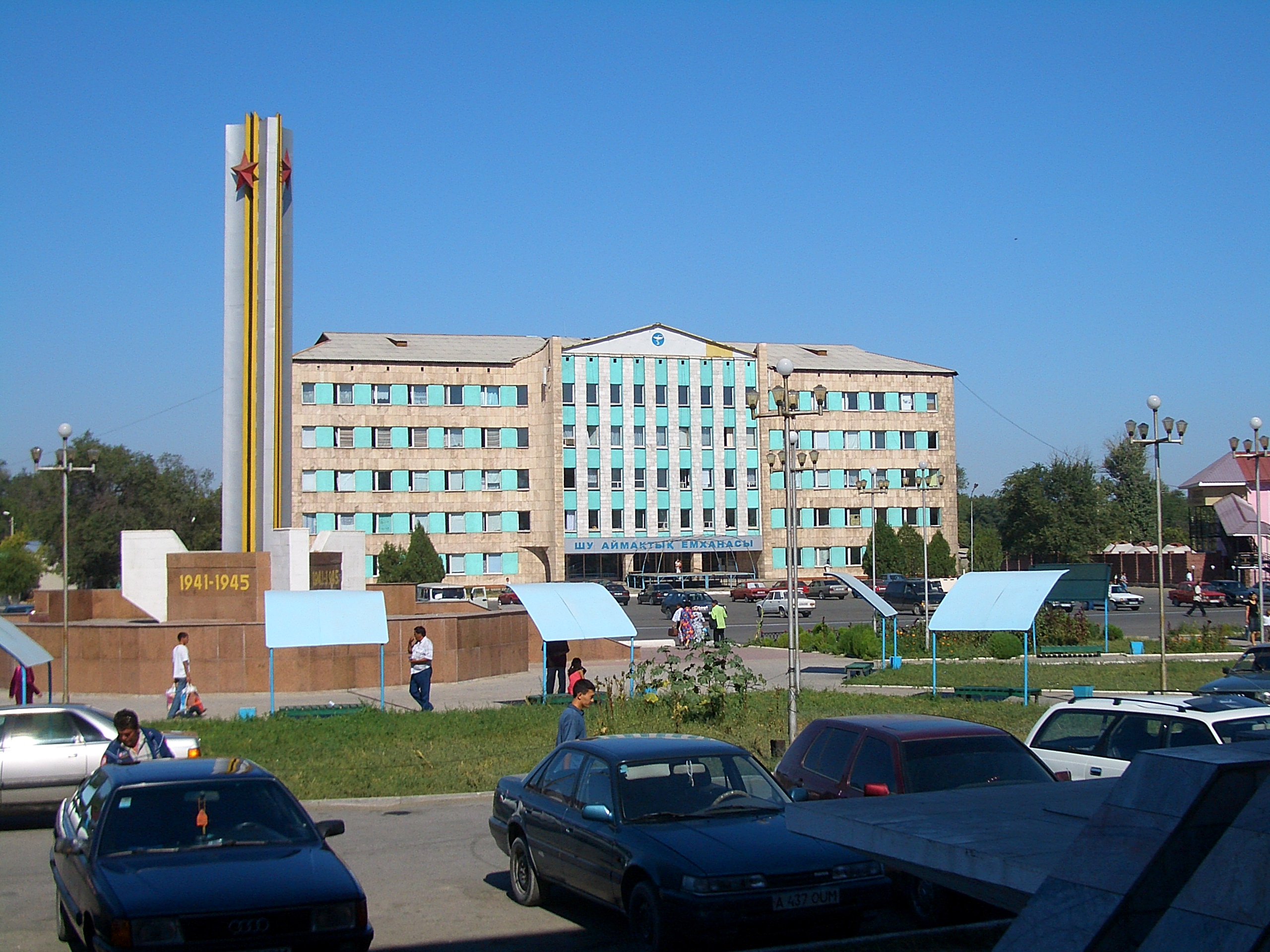
- Shu Hospital

- Location within Kazakhstan
- Coordinates: 43°35′54″N 73°45′41″E
- Country: Kazakhstan
- Region: Jambyl Region
- Established: 1960

Population
  - Total: 35,000
- Time zone: UTC+6 (UTC+6)

Shu (Kazakh: Шу / Şu / شۋ) is a city in the Jambyl Region of Kazakhstan.

The city is located on the Shu River, and is populated by approximately 35,000 people.

== History ==
Named after the Shu historical region, Shu was founded as an urban-type settlement in 1928. It was founded because of Turksib construction. On December 24, 1960, the Supreme Soviet of the Kazakh SSR made it a city. The city's been in Shu District since Nursultan Nazarbayev's Decree on April 1, 1997.

== Transportation ==
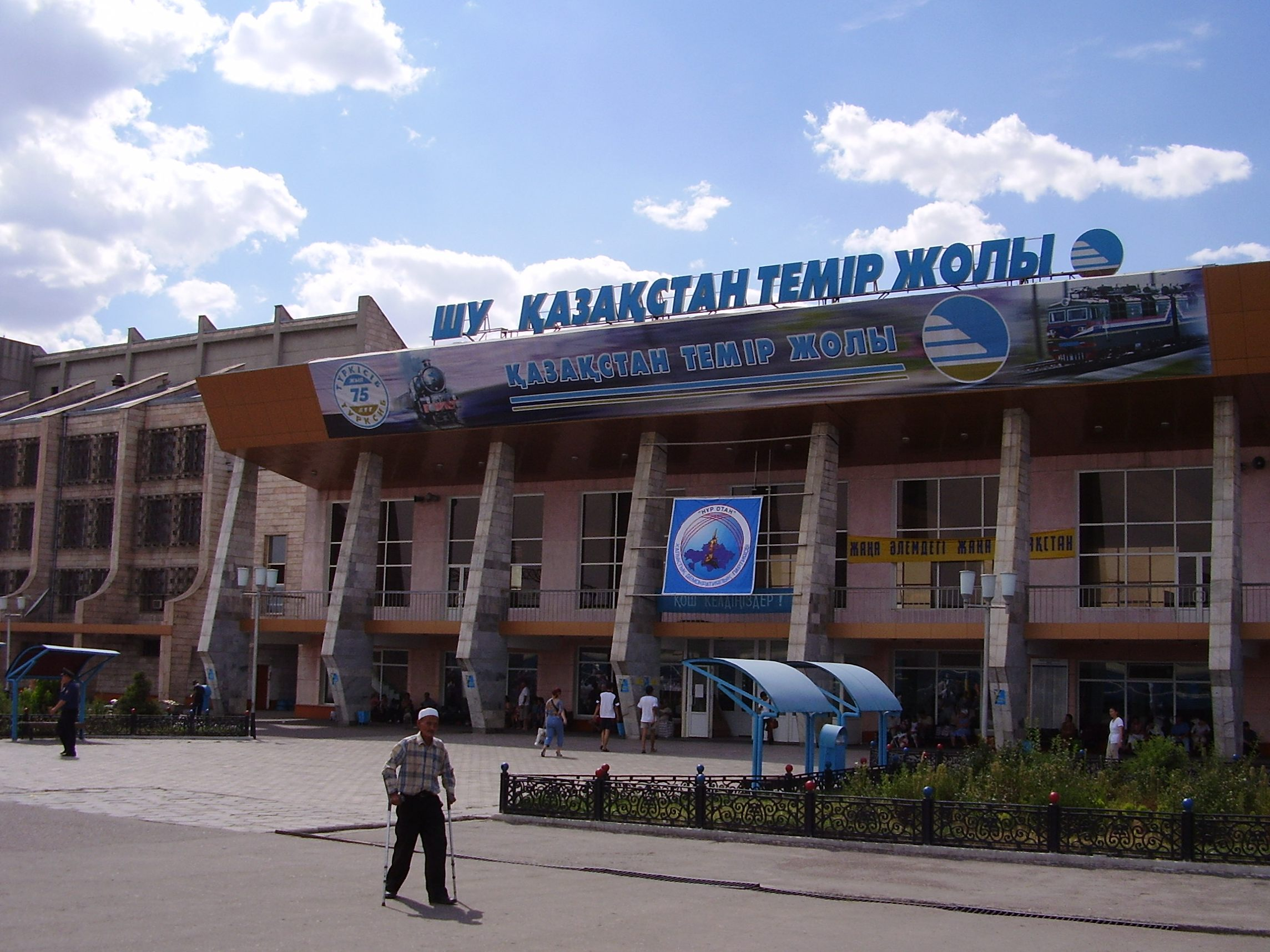
Railway station of Shu

Shu is an important transportation hub for the southern Kazakhstan and northern Kyrgyzstan regions. This is where the east-west Turkestan-Siberia railway is joined with the railway running north to Kazakhstan's new capital, Astana and Petropavl, a city on the Transsiberian railway.

There is no direct railroad from Shu to Bishkek serviced by Kazakhstani trains. This means that every day a large number of passengers travelling from Astana to Bishkek for example arrive in Shu by train and transfer to minivans and taxis to continue into Kyrgyzstan. Though it is possible to travel through Shu and on to Bishkek on Kyrgyz trains, it is much longer than transferring to a minivans for the 1.5 hour ride from Shu to Bishkek rather than the 5 to 6 hour train option.

While Shu functions as a large transportation hub for passengers, its centrality also makes it a hub for rail freight.
