= Say-Otes =

Say-Otes Сай-Өтес ساي-وتەس
- Location within Kazakhstan
- Coordinates: 44°19′40″N 53°31′57″E
- Country: Kazakhstan
- Region: Mangystau
- Elevation: 206 m (676 ft)

Population
  - Total: 1,571
- Time zone: UTC+5 (West Kazakhstan Time)
  - Summer (DST): UTC+5 (West Kazakhstan Time)

Say-Otes (also known as Sayötesh or Say-Utes (Kazakh: Сай-Өтес, Say-Ötes, ساي-وتەس)) is a town in Mangystau Region, southwest Kazakhstan. It lies at an altitude of 206 m (676 ft). It has a population of 1,571.
