= Kenen =

Kenen is a surname. Notable people with the surname include:

- Isaiah L. Kenen (1905–1988), Canadian-born American journalist, lawyer and philanthropist
- Peter Kenen (1932–2012), American economist

== See also ==
- Kenan (name)
- Kenel
