= European route E121 =

Road in trans-European E-road network

E121

Route information
- Length: 4,480 km (2,780 mi)

Major junctions
- North end: Samara, Russia
- South end: Gyzylarbat, Turkmenistan

Location
- Countries: Russia; Kazakhstan; Turkmenistan

Highway system
- International E-road network; A Class; B Class

European Route E121 is a European A class road in Russia, Kazakhstan and Turkmenistan, connecting the cities Samara - Oral - Atyrau - Beyneu - Türkmenbaşy

== Route ==
Russia

- A 300 Samara - Bol'shaya Chernigovka - Russia/Kazakhstan border

Kazakhstan

- Oral - Atyrau - Beyneu - Shetpe - Zhetybay

Turkmenistan

- Garabogaz - Türkmenbaşy - Gyzylarbat - Turkmenistan/Iran border
