= Chaldybar, Chüy =

Chaldybar Чалдыбар
- Location within Kyrgyzstan
- Coordinates: 42°49′48″N 73°31′48″E
- Country: Kyrgyzstan
- Region: Chüy Region
- District: Panfilov District
- Elevation: 700 m (2,300 ft)

Population (2021)
  - Total: 8,465

Chaldybar (Kyrgyz: Чалдыбар, formerly also Chaldovar) is a village in the Panfilov District of Chüy Region of Kyrgyzstan. Its population was 8,465 in 2021.

== Population ==
Historical population
Year	Pop.	±% p.a.
2009	7,426	—
2021	8,465	+1.10%
Note: resident population; Sources:
