= Taskesken =

Coordinates: 44°10′N 52°07′E

Taskesken (Таскескен, تاسكەسكەن) is a small town located in south-east Kazakhstan in Abay region. The European route E40 passes by the town. Taskesken was an independent district center till 1997.
