= Zhetybay =

Zhetybay Жетібай جەتىباي
- Location within Kazakhstan
- Coordinates: 43°35′39″N 52°04′44″E
- Country: Kazakhstan
- Region: Mangystau
- Elevation: 146 m (479 ft)

Population
  - Total: 11,731
- Time zone: UTC+5 (West Kazakhstan Time)
  - Summer (DST): UTC+5 (West Kazakhstan Time)

Zhetybay (also known as Zhetibay (Kazakh: Жетібай, Jetıbai, جەتىباي)) is a town in Mangystau Region, southwest Kazakhstan. It lies at an altitude of 146 m (479 ft). It has a population of 11,731.
