= Dossor =

- Town
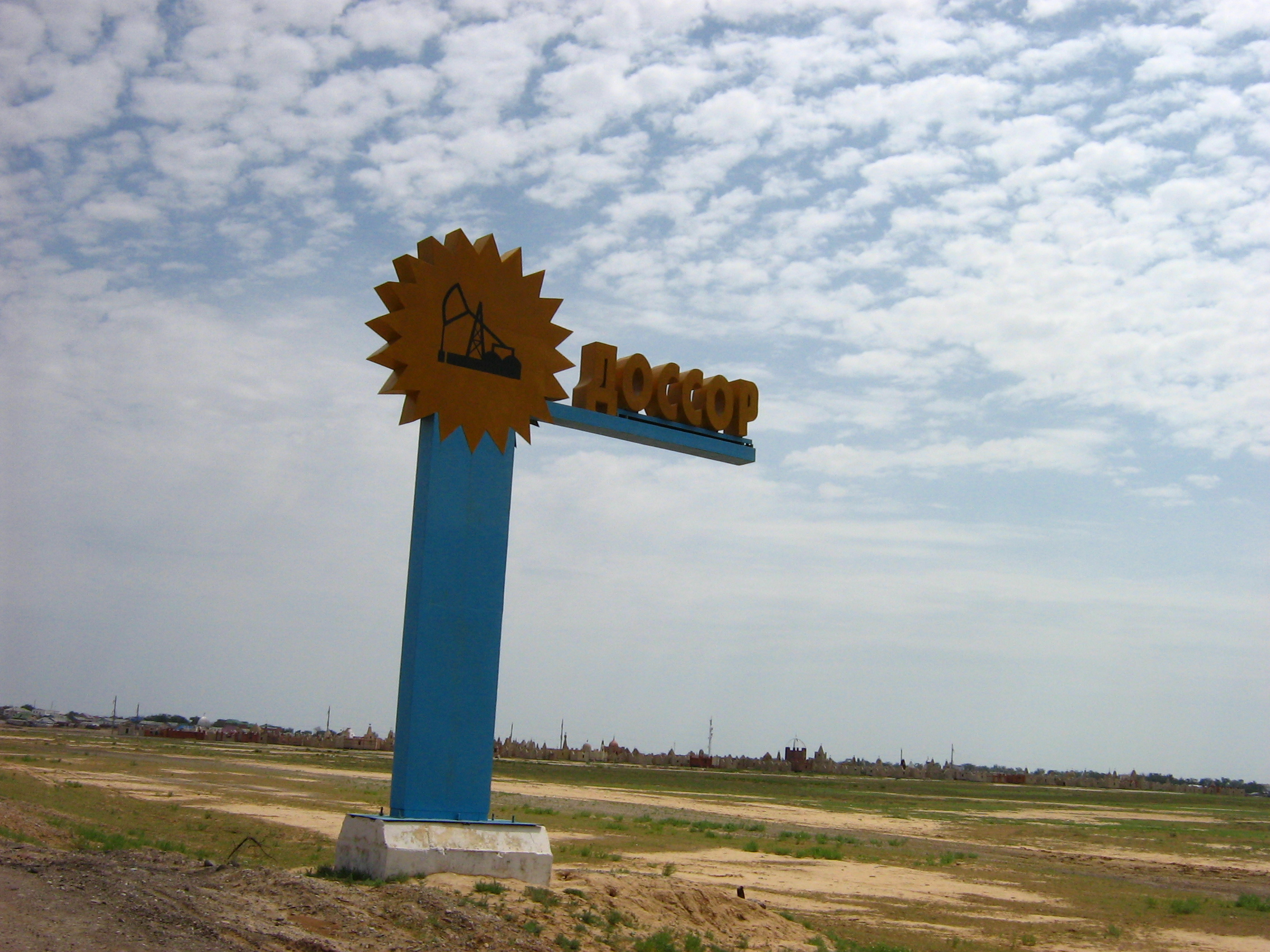
- Interactive map of Dossor
- Coordinates: 47°31′38″N 52°58′52″E
- Country: Kazakhstan
- Region: Atyrau Region
- Time zone: UTC+5 (Central Asia Time)

Dossor or Bos-Sor, ДОССОР (Kazakh: Доссор, Dossor) is a town in the Makat District, Atyrau Region of western Kazakhstan.

In 2011, sixteen freight cars loaded with sulfur were left in the town for 26 days, and residents became ill. Activists blocked the railroad tracks and demanded the cars be removed.
