= Beyneu =

Beyneu Beineu Бейнеу (in Kazakh)
- Location in Kazakhstan
- Coordinates: 45°19′29″N 55°11′45″E
- Country: Kazakhstan
- Region: Mangystau Region

Population
  - Total: 40 344

Beyneu (Kazakh: Бейнеу, romanized: Beineu) is a village and the administrative center of Beyneu District in Mangystau Region in western Kazakhstan.

Beyneu began to expand in the 1970s from a village to a city with the discovery of oil in the area. There is a railway station and, further north in Kasura, there is a Chevron oil plant. The gas pipeline of the Central Asia–Center gas pipeline system metering station at Beyneu on the border with Uzbekistan. Trains from Russia to Uzbekistan and Tajikistan pass through it.

== Climate ==
Beyneu has a highly continental desert climate (Köppen: BWk) with very cold winters and very hot summers.

Climate data for Beyneu (1991–2020)
Month	Jan	Feb	Mar	Apr	May	Jun	Jul	Aug	Sep	Oct	Nov	Dec	Year
Mean daily maximum °C (°F)	−2.8 (27.0)	−0.7 (30.7)	8.5 (47.3)	19.3 (66.7)	27.2 (81.0)	33.1 (91.6)	35.4 (95.7)	34.0 (93.2)	26.5 (79.7)	17.6 (63.7)	6.3 (43.3)	−0.7 (30.7)	17.0 (62.6)
Daily mean °C (°F)	−6.2 (20.8)	−5.1 (22.8)	2.9 (37.2)	12.7 (54.9)	20.5 (68.9)	26.5 (79.7)	28.9 (84.0)	27.2 (81.0)	19.5 (67.1)	10.9 (51.6)	1.7 (35.1)	−4.2 (24.4)	11.3 (52.3)
Mean daily minimum °C (°F)	−9.2 (15.4)	−8.7 (16.3)	−1.4 (29.5)	6.8 (44.2)	14 (57)	19.5 (67.1)	22.1 (71.8)	20.0 (68.0)	12.8 (55.0)	5.1 (41.2)	−1.9 (28.6)	−7.2 (19.0)	6.0 (42.8)
Average precipitation mm (inches)	9.2 (0.36)	8.6 (0.34)	11.5 (0.45)	14.3 (0.56)	16.2 (0.64)	13.7 (0.54)	9.3 (0.37)	3.7 (0.15)	4.7 (0.19)	9.6 (0.38)	10.5 (0.41)	10.3 (0.41)	121.4 (4.78)
Average precipitation days (≥ 1.0 mm)	2.9	2.5	2.8	3.0	3.0	2.2	1.5	0.7	1.1	1.7	2.7	3.2	27.3
Source: NOAA
