= Ustyurt Nature Reserve =

Nature reserve in southwest Kazakhstan

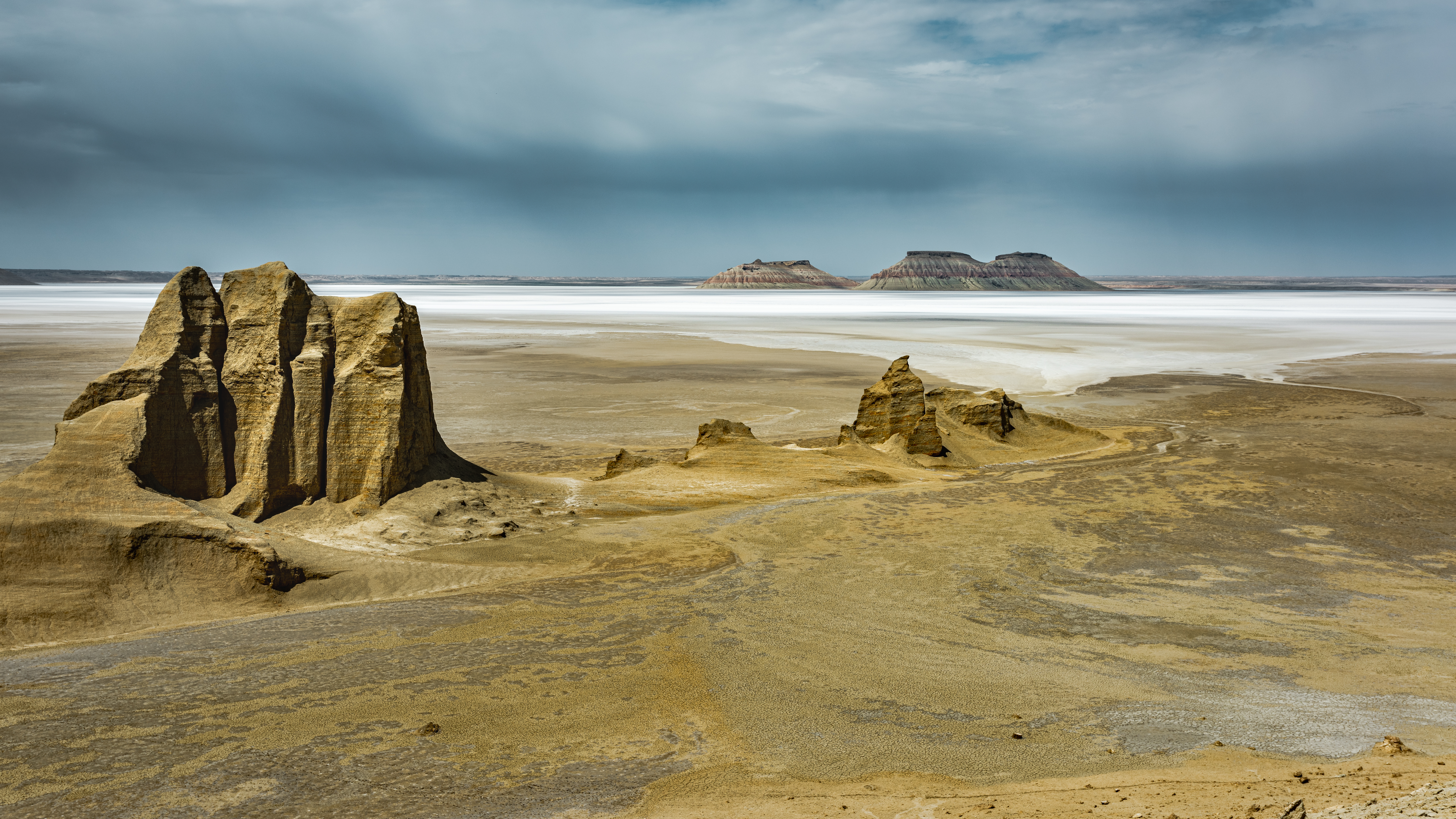

- Location within Kazakhstan
- Location: Mangystau Region, Kazakhstan
- Nearest city: Aqqudyq
- Coordinates: 43°13′44″N 54°39′14″E
- Area: 223,000 hectares (2,230 km^{2})
- Established: 12 July 1984

Ustyurt Nature Reserve (Kazakh: Үстірт мемлекеттік табиғи қорығы, Üstırt memlekettık tabiği qoryğy; Russian: Устюрт национальный заповедник, Ustyurt natsional'nyy zapovednik), or the Ustyurt National Biosphere Reserve, is a nature reserve, created on 12 July 1984 in what was then the Kazakh Soviet Socialist Republic (K.S.S.R.), in Mangystau Region, southwest Kazakhstan. Its area is 223,000 hectares (2,230 km^{2}), and lies within Ustyurt Plateau. The reserve lies near the borders with Uzbekistan and Turkmenistan. Its purpose is to preserve the deserts as well as the rare flora and fauna. The Sherkala mountain and the Valley of Balls lie within the reserve. In addition, it contains a large variety of flora and fauna.

== Climate ==
The temperatures vary greatly: from more than 40 °C (104 °F) during the summer months, down to less than −41 °C (−42 °F) during the winter months. The average annual precipitation is only 120 mm (4.7 in).

== Flora and fauna ==
There are 250 species of flora from 163 different genera and families within the reserve, such as grey sage, feather grass, anabasis-salsa and saltwort. 37 of the species come from the family Chenopodiaceae.

About 44 species of mammal live within the reserve, including many rare animals, such as the Ustyurt mouflon, saiga antelope, jeyran, fox and polecat. Wolves and jackals can also be found, along with the weasel and ferret. The saiga, Persian gazelle and Ustyurt mouflon are considered to only live around Ustyurt and Mangyshlak.

In September 2021, wolves, jackals, mountain rams, caracals, and other animals were caught on camera in the Ustyurt Nature Reserve.

== Landscape ==
Ustyurt Nature Reserve contains a variety of landscapes, from steppes and depressions to pillars reaching several hundred metres in height. The pillars can be several colours, including pale pink, blue and white. The Kenderlisor depression spans the entire length of the reserve, from the southwest to the northeast. Shakhr-i-Vazir, an ancient city, also lies in the reserve, along with dozens of Neolithic sites.
