= Koshkar-Ata (lake) =

Lake in Mangystau Region, southwest Kazakhstan

- Қошқарата
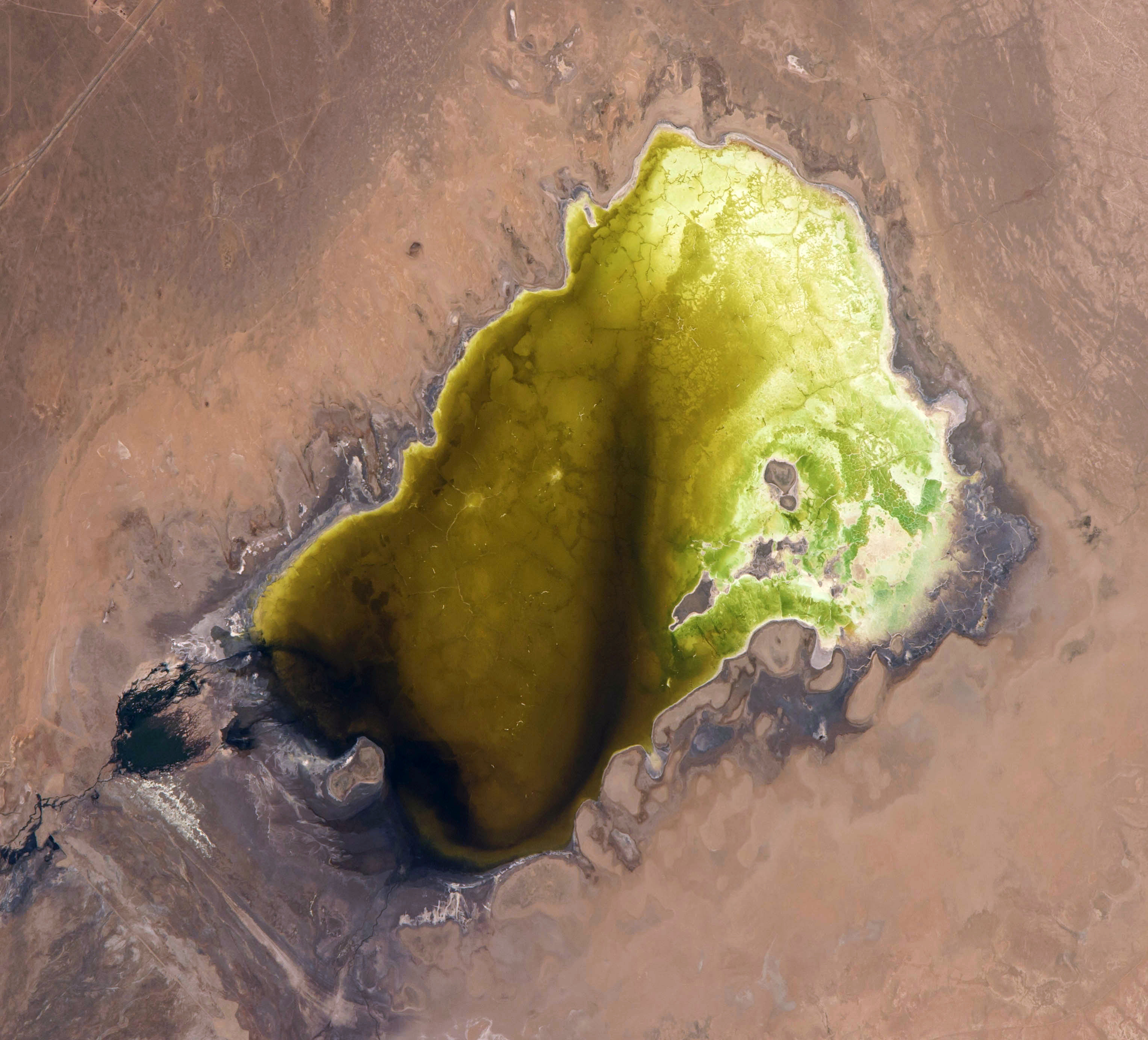
- View of the lake taken during ISS Expedition 44

- Location within Kazakhstan Location within Asia
- Location: Mangystau Region, Kazakhstan
- Coordinates: 43°47′N 51°14′E
- Surface area: 65 square kilometers (25 sq mi)
- Surface elevation: −36 m (−118 ft)
- Settlements: Akshukyr, Bayandy, Aktau (5 km (3.1 mi) away), Mangystau

Koshkar-Ata (Kazakh: Қошқарата) is a lake in Mangystau Region, southwest Kazakhstan. It lies 5 km (3.1 mi) north of the regional capital of Aktau and 8 km (5.0 mi) from the shores of the Caspian Sea. It is 36 m (118 ft) below sea level. It is a serious environmental and health hazard due to it being used as a mining waste dump between the 1960s and 1990s.

== History ==
Before industrial activity began in the 1960s, Koshkar-Ata was a periodic lake, rich in natural salt, which was unsuitable for farming. However, the discovery of vast uranium deposits in western Kazakhstan soon led to a uranium extraction and processing industry. In the 1980s at its peak production, Kazakhstan was producing more than one third of all uranium in the Soviet Union. It had more than 30 mines.

The lake was chosen as a location to dump all the radioactive and toxic waste from the chemical complex in Shevchenko (now called Aktau). However, in 1999, because of various reasons like decreasing uranium resources and an economic crisis, led to the complete end of uranium mining.

During the uranium period, 356 million tonnes of mining waste went into Koshkar-Ata; uranium accounted for 105 million tonnes.

== Current situation ==
Due to high evaporation rates and lack of water, Koshkar-Ata might dry out sometime in the future. The southern part of the lake is already exposed to the air which, due to strong winds in the area, could disperse the dangerous chemicals to other areas, including the Caspian Sea. The local authorities are concerned about the possibility of this happening; however, there is no hard evidence to suggest that this is indeed the case. High concentrations of manganese, strontium, molybdenum and lead, as well as other rare-earth metals and radionuclides, are present. Every year, millions of litres of water are being pumped into the lake, at a cost of ₸5.5 million (€34,000).
