= Kyzan =

Kyzan Қызан قىزان
- Location within Kazakhstan
- Coordinates: 44°53′40″N 52°40′53″E
- Country: Kazakhstan
- Region: Mangystau
- Elevation: −6 m (−20 ft)
- Time zone: UTC+5 (West Kazakhstan Time)
  - Summer (DST): UTC+5 (West Kazakhstan Time)

Kyzan (also known as Qyzan (Kazakh: Қызан, Qızan, قىزان)) is a town in Mangystau Region, southwest Kazakhstan. It lies at an altitude of 6 m (20 ft) below sea level.

== Climate ==
Kyzan has a cold desert climate (BWk) according to the Köppen climate classification.

Climate data for Kyzan (1991–2020)
Month	Jan	Feb	Mar	Apr	May	Jun	Jul	Aug	Sep	Oct	Nov	Dec	Year
Mean daily maximum °C (°F)	−0.1 (31.8)	1.8 (35.2)	10.2 (50.4)	19.6 (67.3)	27.2 (81.0)	33.0 (91.4)	35.3 (95.5)	34.1 (93.4)	27.1 (80.8)	18.5 (65.3)	8.0 (46.4)	1.7 (35.1)	18 (64)
Daily mean °C (°F)	−3.9 (25.0)	−3.1 (26.4)	4.1 (39.4)	12.7 (54.9)	20.4 (68.7)	26.1 (79.0)	28.5 (83.3)	27.1 (80.8)	20.0 (68.0)	11.7 (53.1)	3.2 (37.8)	−2.1 (28.2)	12.1 (53.8)
Mean daily minimum °C (°F)	−7.0 (19.4)	−6.9 (19.6)	−0.6 (30.9)	6.8 (44.2)	14.1 (57.4)	19.2 (66.6)	21.8 (71.2)	20.2 (68.4)	13.5 (56.3)	6.2 (43.2)	−0.6 (30.9)	−5.2 (22.6)	6.8 (44.2)
Average precipitation mm (inches)	11.3 (0.44)	8.4 (0.33)	16.5 (0.65)	18.6 (0.73)	22.5 (0.89)	18.6 (0.73)	12.7 (0.50)	7.8 (0.31)	6.1 (0.24)	10.8 (0.43)	14.1 (0.56)	12.0 (0.47)	159.4 (6.28)
Average precipitation days (≥ 1.0 mm)	3.1	2.4	3.3	3.3	3.3	2.8	2.3	1.3	1.6	2.1	3.2	3.3	32
Source: NOAA
