= Akshimrau =

Akshimrau Ақшымырау اقشىمىراۋ
- Location within Kazakhstan
- Coordinates: 44°48′00″N 52°50′00″E
- Country: Kazakhstan
- Region: Mangystau
- Elevation: −6 m (−20 ft)
- Time zone: UTC+5 (West Kazakhstan Time)
  - Summer (DST): UTC+5 (West Kazakhstan Time)

Akshimrau (also known as Akshynyrau (Kazakh: Ақшымырау, Aqşymyrau, اقشىمىراۋ)) is a town in the Mangystau Region of southwest Kazakhstan. It lies at an altitude of 6 m (20 ft) below sea level.
