= Beyneu District =

Coordinates: 45°19′48″N 55°11′24″E

Beyneu Бейнеу
- District
- Бейнеу ауданы
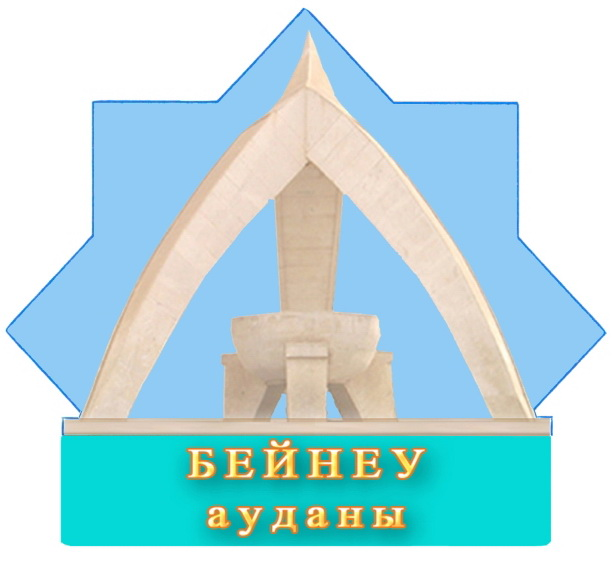
- Seal

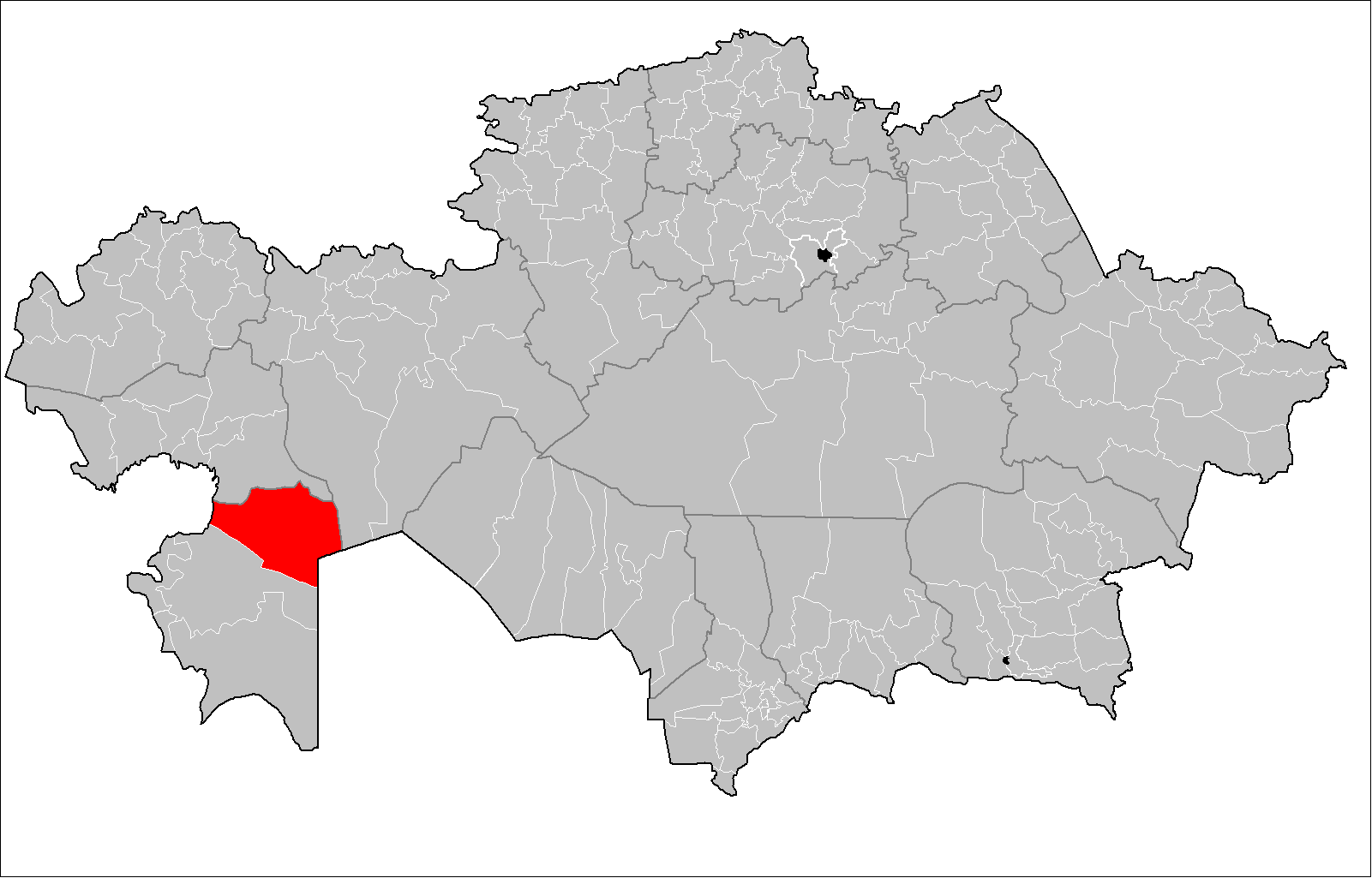
- Country: Kazakhstan
- Region: Mangystau Region
- Administrative center: Beyneu

Government
  - Akim: Rakhimzhan Shalbayev (acting)

Area
  - Total: 13,150 sq mi (34,060 km^{2})

Population (2018)
  - Total: 68,285
  - Density: 5.193/sq mi (2.005/km^{2})
- Time zone: UTC+5 (West)

Beyneu District (Kazakh: Бейнеу ауданы, romanized: Beineu audany) is a district of Mangystau Region in south-western Kazakhstan. The administrative center of the district is the auyl of Beyneu. The district's population was 68,285 in 2018. The Census population in 2009 was 46,937 and in 1999 had been 26,548.

== Geography ==
The territory of the district is occupied by the eastern edge of the Caspian lowland with sands and salt marshes (Dead Kultuk, etc.), the eastern part is the Ustyurt Plateau with the Mynsualmas hill. Reserves of petroleum and gas, shell rock, and construction sands have been explored in the depths. The climate is continental. The average temperature in January is −4 °C, July 25–27 °C. Precipitation falls 120–130 mm per year. Sandstorms are frequent. The vegetation is semi-desert: halophytes, artemisia (plant), haloxylon thickets in places. There are saiga antelopes, goitered gazelle, hare, wolf, fox, rodents and others.

== History ==
It was formed in 1973. In 1988–1990, during the abolition of the Mangyshlak region, it was part of the Guryev region.
