= Ushtagan =

Ushtagan Үштаған ۋشتاگان
- Location within Kazakhstan
- Coordinates: 43°49′30″N 52°43′25″E
- Country: Kazakhstan
- Region: Mangystau
- Elevation: 171 m (561 ft)
- Time zone: UTC+5 (West Kazakhstan Time)
  - Summer (DST): UTC+5 (West Kazakhstan Time)

Ushtagan (Kazakh: Үштаған, Üştağan, ۋشتاگان), also known as Üshtaghan, is a town in Mangystau Region, southwest Kazakhstan. It lies at an altitude of 171 m (561 ft).

== Climate ==
Ushtagan has a cold semi-arid climate (Köppen: BSk), characterized by cold winters and hot summers.

Climate data for Ushtagan (1991–2020, extremes 1959–present)
| Month | Jan | Feb | Mar | Apr | May | Jun | Jul | Aug | Sep | Oct | Nov | Dec | Year |
|---|---|---|---|---|---|---|---|---|---|---|---|---|---|
| Record high °C (°F) | 14.6 (58.3) | 14.6 (58.3) | 25.8 (78.4) | 33.7 (92.7) | 40.5 (104.9) | 45.4 (113.7) | 44.8 (112.6) | 43.0 (109.4) | 40.6 (105.1) | 31.6 (88.9) | 21.5 (70.7) | 11.8 (53.2) | 45.4 (113.7) |
| Mean daily maximum °C (°F) | −2.6 (27.3) | −0.9 (30.4) | 7.5 (45.5) | 18.1 (64.6) | 26.1 (79.0) | 31.6 (88.9) | 34.1 (93.4) | 32.8 (91.0) | 25.0 (77.0) | 15.9 (60.6) | 5.4 (41.7) | −1.0 (30.2) | 16.0 (60.8) |
| Daily mean °C (°F) | −6.5 (20.3) | −5.7 (21.7) | 1.8 (35.2) | 11.0 (51.8) | 18.8 (65.8) | 24.3 (75.7) | 26.8 (80.2) | 25.0 (77.0) | 17.5 (63.5) | 9.3 (48.7) | 0.8 (33.4) | −4.7 (23.5) | 9.9 (49.8) |
| Mean daily minimum °C (°F) | −9.7 (14.5) | −9.3 (15.3) | −2.5 (27.5) | 5.1 (41.2) | 12.2 (54.0) | 17.4 (63.3) | 19.9 (67.8) | 17.7 (63.9) | 10.9 (51.6) | 4.2 (39.6) | −2.5 (27.5) | −7.6 (18.3) | 4.6 (40.3) |
| Record low °C (°F) | −36.3 (−33.3) | −35.8 (−32.4) | −26.6 (−15.9) | −8.4 (16.9) | −1.0 (30.2) | 2.8 (37.0) | 7.4 (45.3) | 4.0 (39.2) | −2.5 (27.5) | −12.4 (9.7) | −25.4 (−13.7) | −28.7 (−19.7) | −36.3 (−33.3) |
| Average precipitation mm (inches) | 15.4 (0.61) | 13.5 (0.53) | 15.5 (0.61) | 17.5 (0.69) | 21.1 (0.83) | 20.3 (0.80) | 15.3 (0.60) | 11.4 (0.45) | 15.8 (0.62) | 20.8 (0.82) | 13.9 (0.55) | 16.5 (0.65) | 197.0 (7.76) |
| Average precipitation days (≥ 1.0 mm) | 4.3 | 3.3 | 4.1 | 3.4 | 3.8 | 3.5 | 2.5 | 2.2 | 2.8 | 4.0 | 3.9 | 4.6 | 42.4 |
Source 1: NOAA
Source 2: Pogoda.ru.net
