= Shebir =

Shebir Шебир شەبير
- Location within Kazakhstan
- Coordinates: 44°49′20″N 52°05′22″E
- Country: Kazakhstan
- Region: Mangystau
- Elevation: −3 m (−9.8 ft)
- Time zone: UTC+5 (West Kazakhstan Time)
  - Summer (DST): UTC+5 (West Kazakhstan Time)

Shebir (Kazakh: Шебир, Shebir, شەبير) is a town in Mangystau Region, southwest Kazakhstan. It lies at an altitude of 3 m (9.8 ft) below sea level.
