= Tushikuduk =

Tushikuduk Тущыкудук تۋششىكۋدۋك
- Location within Kazakhstan
- Coordinates: 44°45′00″N 51°58′00″E
- Country: Kazakhstan
- Region: Mangystau
- Elevation: −3 m (−9.8 ft)
- Time zone: UTC+5 (West Kazakhstan Time)
  - Summer (DST): UTC+5 (West Kazakhstan Time)

Tushikuduk (Kazakh: Тущыкудук, Tushchıkuduk, تۋششىكۋدۋك), also known as Tushchyqudyq, is a town in Mangystau Region, southwest Kazakhstan. It lies at an altitude of 3 m (9.8 ft) below sea level. On 17 July 2022, a maximum temperature of 45.9 °C (114.6 °F) was registered in Tushikuduk.
