= Fort-Shevchenko =

Fort-Shevchenko Форт-Шевченко
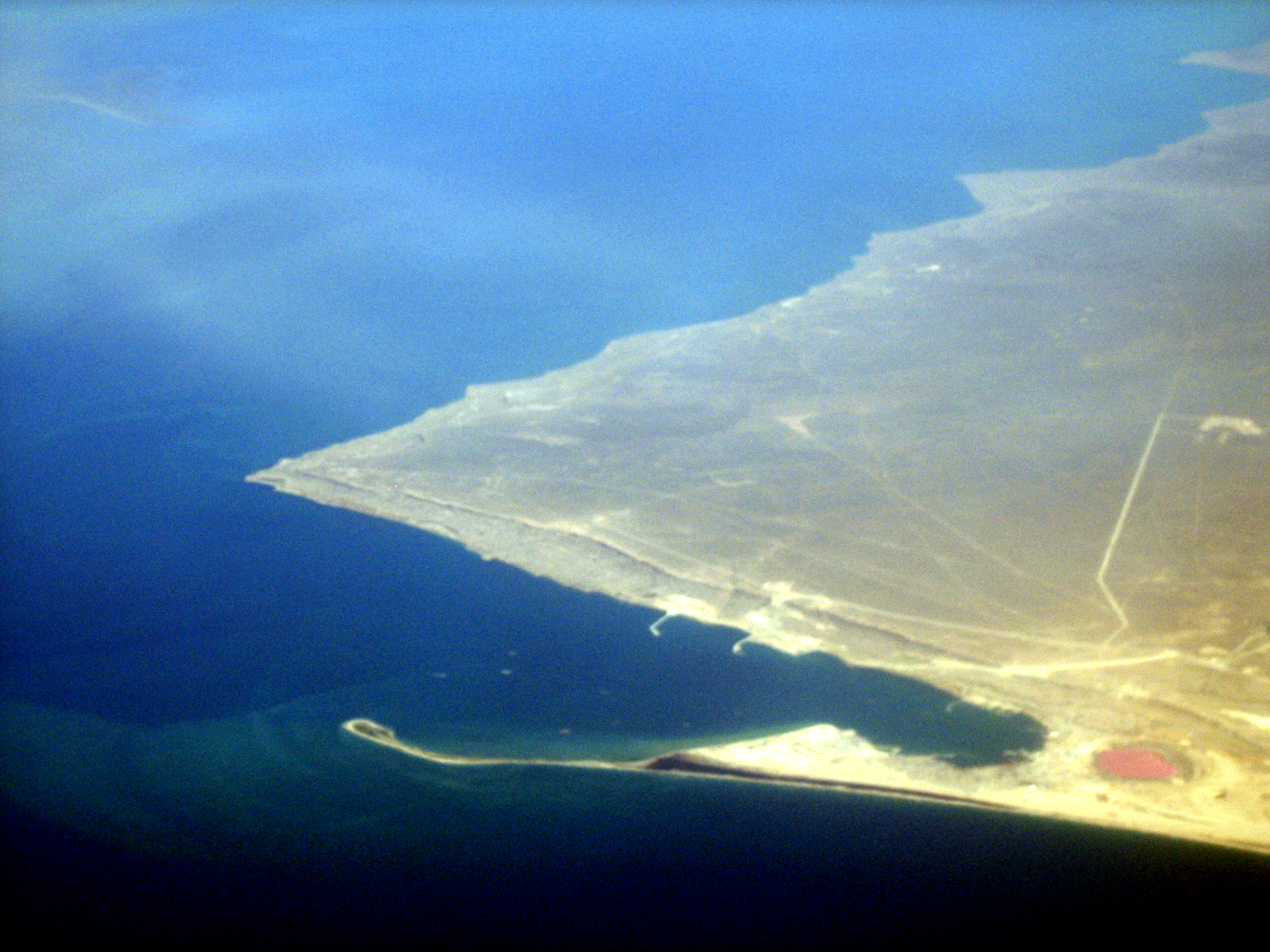
- Fort-Shevchenko from the air

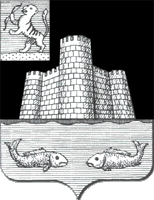
- Coat of arms

- Location in Kazakhstan
- Coordinates: 44°31′N 50°16′E
- Country: Kazakhstan
- Region: Mangystau Region

Population (2016)
  - Total: 5,559
- Time zone: UTC+5 (+5)

Fort-Shevchenko (Kazakh: Форт-Шевченко) is a military-base town and administrative centre of Tupkaragan District in Mangystau Region of Kazakhstan on the eastern shore of Caspian Sea. Primary industries include fishing and the extraction of stone. Its population was 5,559 (2016 estimate).

== History ==
The city was founded as a military stronghold by the Imperial Russian Navy in 1846 after nearby New Alexander Fort, built in 1834 overlooking Dead Kultuk, was deemed too remote. Until 1857, Fort Shevchenko was known as Novopetrovskoye (Новопетровское) and from 1857 to 1939 as Fort-Aleksandrovskii (Форт-Александровский). It was named for Ukrainian poet Taras Shevchenko, who was assigned to military service here during his exile. Today the town is used by the Kazakhstan Navy as a base.

The coat of arms of Fort Alexandrovsky was approved October 22, 1908, along with other arms of the Transcaspian field: It is black and silver depicting the fortress and two fish.

=== Russian Civil War ===
Fort Alexandrovsky was the site of naval action on 21 May 1919, when a Squadron of the British Caspian Flotilla attacked the port.

== Climate ==
Climate data for Fort-Shevchenko (1991–2020, extremes 1848–present)
Month	Jan	Feb	Mar	Apr	May	Jun	Jul	Aug	Sep	Oct	Nov	Dec	Year
Record high °C (°F)	16.0 (60.8)	19.0 (66.2)	25.2 (77.4)	31.1 (88.0)	37.4 (99.3)	40.6 (105.1)	41.1 (106.0)	41.4 (106.5)	40.0 (104.0)	31.2 (88.2)	22.3 (72.1)	16.0 (60.8)	41.4 (106.5)
Mean daily maximum °C (°F)	1.8 (35.2)	2.7 (36.9)	8.0 (46.4)	14.6 (58.3)	22.0 (71.6)	27.5 (81.5)	30.1 (86.2)	29.5 (85.1)	24.2 (75.6)	16.9 (62.4)	9.1 (48.4)	3.8 (38.8)	15.9 (60.6)
Daily mean °C (°F)	−0.7 (30.7)	−0.2 (31.6)	4.9 (40.8)	11.4 (52.5)	18.6 (65.5)	24.3 (75.7)	26.7 (80.1)	25.9 (78.6)	20.7 (69.3)	13.7 (56.7)	6.2 (43.2)	1.3 (34.3)	12.7 (54.9)
Mean daily minimum °C (°F)	−2.9 (26.8)	−2.7 (27.1)	2.1 (35.8)	8.4 (47.1)	15.6 (60.1)	21.2 (70.2)	23.6 (74.5)	22.6 (72.7)	17.6 (63.7)	10.8 (51.4)	3.8 (38.8)	−0.9 (30.4)	9.9 (49.8)
Record low °C (°F)	−27.0 (−16.6)	−30.0 (−22.0)	−19.7 (−3.5)	−2.8 (27.0)	0.0 (32.0)	9.0 (48.2)	13.8 (56.8)	10.0 (50.0)	2.0 (35.6)	−7.2 (19.0)	−16.1 (3.0)	−18.2 (−0.8)	−30.0 (−22.0)
Average precipitation mm (inches)	11 (0.4)	7 (0.3)	11 (0.4)	20 (0.8)	10 (0.4)	5 (0.2)	10 (0.4)	6 (0.2)	9 (0.4)	9 (0.4)	13 (0.5)	9 (0.4)	120 (4.7)
Mean monthly sunshine hours	88	114	158	225	300	329	337	315	260	193	103	74	2,496
Source 1: Pogoda.ru.net
Source 2: NOAA (sun, 1961–1990)

== Landmarks ==
There are several landmarks of significance; Shevchenko Memorial Museum, National History, and ethnographic museums. The Shevchenko Memorial Museum opened in 1932 near where he had been hiding. There are also some remnants of the fortress, a monument to Shevchenko and a state grave of Civil War heroes.

31 km from the city is the necropolis Beysenbay and up the coast the site Bautino (Баутино).
