= Munayshi =

Munayshi Мұнайшы مۇنايشى
- Location within Kazakhstan
- Coordinates: 43°29′28″N 52°06′31″E
- Country: Kazakhstan
- Region: Mangystau
- Elevation: 126 m (413 ft)

Population
  - Total: 4,085
- Time zone: UTC+5 (West Kazakhstan Time)
  - Summer (DST): UTC+5 (West Kazakhstan Time)

Munayshi (also known as Munayshy (Kazakh: Мұнайшы, Munayshı, مۇنايشى)) is a town in Mangystau Region, southwest Kazakhstan. It lies at an altitude of 126 m (413 ft).
