= Ustyurt Plateau =

Transboundary clay desert shared by Turkmenistan, Uzbekistan and Kazakhstan

Ustyurt Turkmen: Üstyurt Kazakh: Үстірт Uzbek: Ustyurt Karakalpak: Ústirt
- Desert
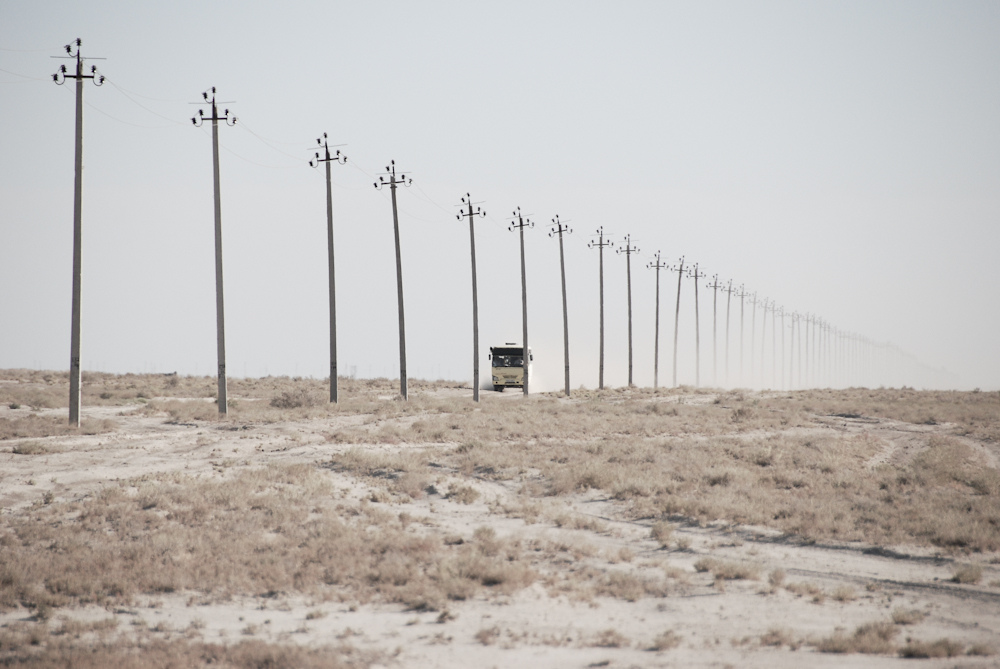
- Ustyurt desert road

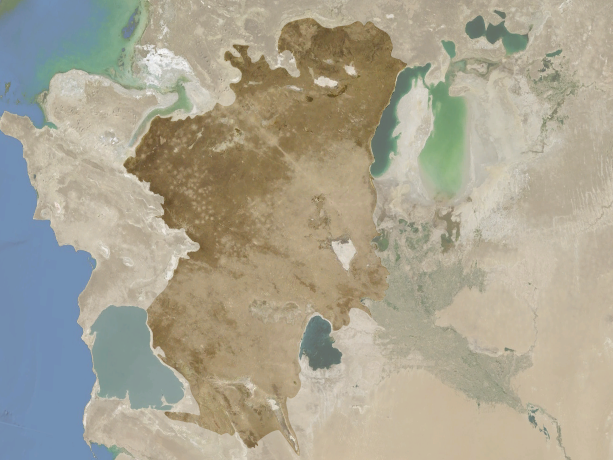
- Map of the Ustyurt Plateau
- Coordinates: 43°17′N 55°33′E
- Location: Kazakhstan; Turkmenistan; Uzbekistan

Area
  - Total: 200,000 km^{2} (77,000 sq mi)
- Elevation: 160 meters (520 ft) to 200 meters (660 ft)

The Ustyurt or Ust-Yurt (from Kazakh: Үстірт; Uzbek: Ustyurt; Turkmen: Üstyurt; Karakalpak: Ústirt — flat hill, plateau) is a transboundary clay desert shared by Kazakhstan, Turkmenistan, and Uzbekistan.

The plateau's semi-nomadic population raises camels, goats, and sheep.

== Geography ==
The Ustyurt is located between the Dead Kultuk, Mangyshlak Peninsula and Kara-Bogaz-Gol of the Caspian Sea to the west, and the Aral Sea, Amudarya Delta and Sarygamysh Lake to the east.

It extends roughly 200,000 km^{2} (77,000 sq mi), with an average altitude of 150 m (490 ft). Its highest point rises to 370 m (1,200 ft) in the south-west. At its northeastern edge it drops steeply to the Aral Sea and the surrounding plain.

The Ustyurt Plateau is bounded by steep cliffs called chinks nearly from everywhere. To the east, it encompasses the historical western shoreline of the Aral Sea. In the southern region, it extends to the Kunya-Darya alluvial plain and the valley of the Uzboy, while in the west, it reaches the Karynyaryk depression. To the north, it spans the Karakum sands of the North Caspian Sea and includes the Caspian Depression. Ustyurt chinks often have multicolored layers, with colors of pale pink, blue, clear white, etc., and can form fancy landscapes.

== Protected areas ==
Kazakhstan created the Ustyurt Nature Reserve (223,300 hectares) in July, 1984 in the south of Mangystausky district in Eralievsky region. It preserves rare fauna and flora such as the Ustyurt Mountain sheep and the Saiga antelope. Among its features are Sherkala Mountain and the concretions found in the Torysh ('Valley of Balls') near the town of Shetpe.

== See also ==
- Emba (river)
- Karakalpaks
- Khwarezm oasis region
- Transcaspian Oblast
