= Mangystau District =

Coordinates: 44°41′24″N 53°04′12″E

Mangystau Маңғыстау
- District
- Mañğystau audany
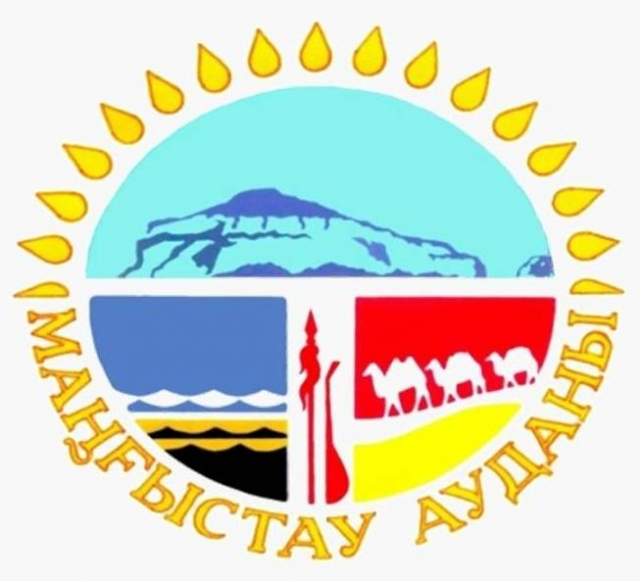
- Coat of arms

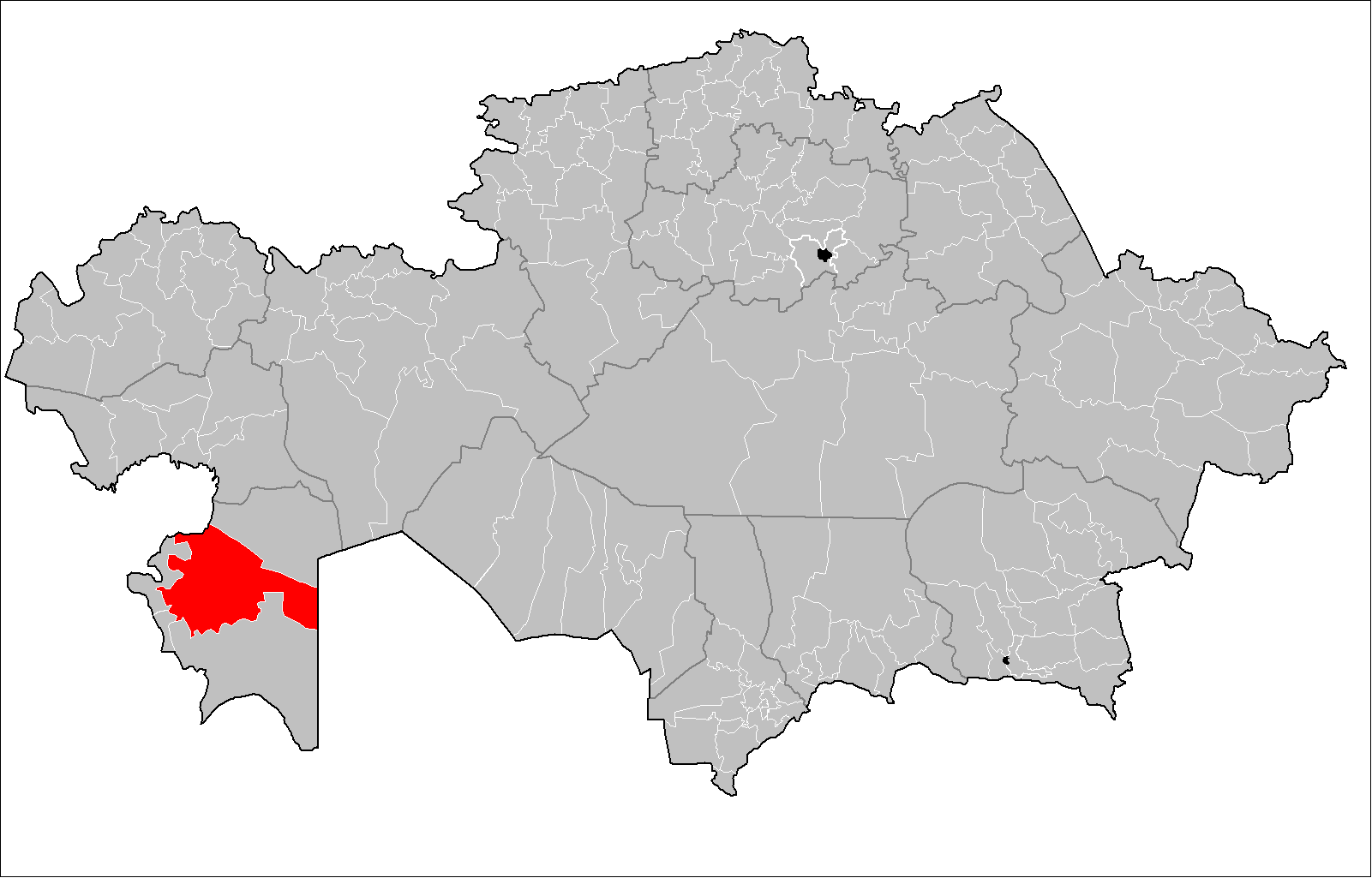
- Country: Kazakhstan
- Region: Mangystau Region
- Administrative center: Shetpe

Government
  - Akim: Niyazov Galymzhan

Population (2013)
  - Total: 33,599
- Time zone: UTC+5 (West)

Mangystau District (Kazakh: Маңғыстау ауданы, Mañğystau audany) is a district of Mangystau Region in south-western Kazakhstan. The administrative center of the district is the selo of Shetpe. Population: 33,599 (2013 estimate); 29,024 (2009 census results); 31,215 (1999 census results).
