= Torysh =

Valley near Shetpe, Kazakhstan

Coordinates: 44.3614°N 51.5611°E

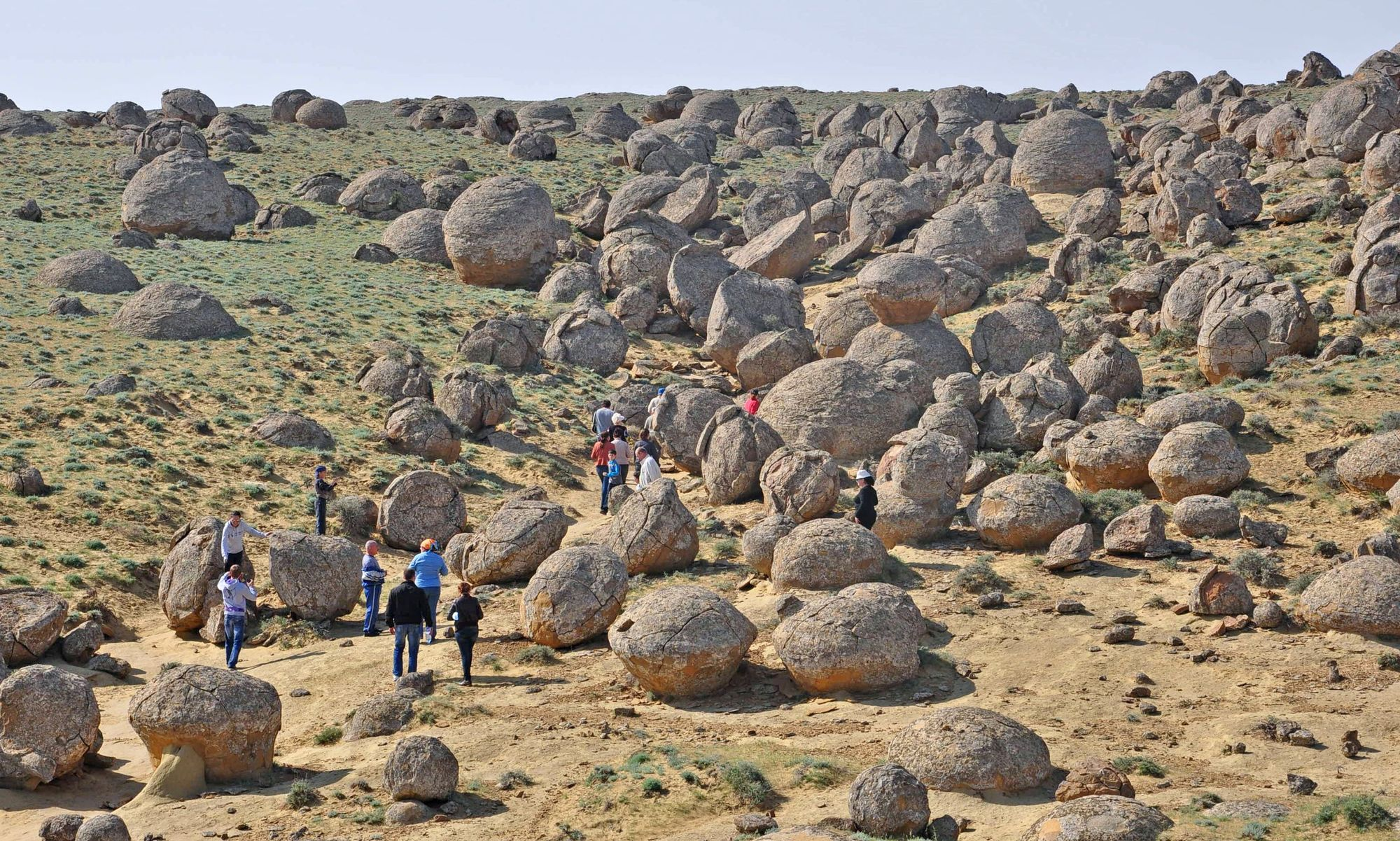
- Ball shaped rock formations

- Coordinates
- Location: Mangystau Region, Kazakhstan

Torysh is a valley close to the village of Shetpe and the mountain Sherkala in Mangystau, Kazakhstan. Also known as "The Valley of Balls", the area features many spherical rock formations which have formed naturally across the landscape in the sedimentary rock, through a concretion process. It is near the eastern shores of the Caspian Sea and the medieval trading settlement of Kyzylkala.

== Rocks ==
There has been little research into the formation of the ball-shaped rocks in Torysh. However, there is a prevailing theory that they are the product of various geological processes:

1. Sediment deposition occurs from the Caspian, which used to extend this far, although only to a shallow depth.
2. Various organic and inorganic hard, small items (such as shells, grains of sand and minerals) act as nucleation point, beginning the sedimentation process.
3. Minerals (usually calcites, silicates and iron oxides) precipitate and combine onto the nuclei, known as concretion. The resultant rocks are formed of onion-like layers.
4. The rocks undergo cementation, a process wherein minerals adhere to the deposits to bind them together, forming a much harder, more erosion-resistant rock.
5. Lithification acts on the rocks, making them harder and less porous, while they are compacted, consolidating the visible sedimentary layers.
6. Finally, erosion of the surrounding rock leaves the concretions behind, as uplift from the tectonic plates push the boulders towards the surface.

This process occurs over tens of millions of years. The complicated mix of processes means that the boulders vary in appearance, with some exhibiting cracks and weathering marks, while others being completely smooth. Rocks also vary in colour. They also vary in size, from marble-sized to car-sized, although most are roughly 3-4 metres in diameter.

This type of rocks is not rare around the world, although Torysh is home to some of the largest examples. Some of the boulders are embedded within softer sedimentary rocks in the ground of the valley. These rocks may contain unique fossils as a result - many Jurassic fossils of plants have been found at and near the site. The boulders date from the Jurassic Cretaceous period, around 120-180 million years ago.

The area has a high salt deposits in the ground, as it is situated near the Caspian and the rocks were formed therefrom. Salt-tolerant shrubs and grasses grow, which can survive the arid and salty conditions.

== Folklore ==
According to local legend, the Mangystau Region in modern-day western Kazakhstan was invaded by hordes of enemies. Residents prayed for help, and the skies sent a downpour of rain, thunder and lightning. All the enemies were instantly turned to stone, leaving thousands of strange rock formations across the region, and in Torysh.
