= Akshukyr =

Akshukyr Ақшұқыр اقشۇقىر
- Location within Kazakhstan
- Coordinates: 43°46′24″N 51°03′55″E
- Country: Kazakhstan
- Region: Mangystau
- Elevation: −24 m (−79 ft)

Population
  - Total: 6,230
- Time zone: UTC+5 (West Kazakhstan Time)
  - Summer (DST): UTC+5 (West Kazakhstan Time)

Akshukyr (also known as Aqshuqyr (Kazakh: Ақшұқыр, Aqşūqyr, اقشۇقىر) is a town in Tupkaragan District, Mangystau Region, southwest Kazakhstan. It is the administrative centre of Tupkaragan District. It lies at an altitude of 24 m (79 ft) below sea level, 8 km far from the Caspian Sea.

== Population ==
According to the Kazakhstan 1999 census, there were a total of 3347 people in the town (1658 men and 1689 women). In 2009, there were a total of 6230 people (3146 men and 3084 women).
