= Senek =

Senek Сенек سەنەك
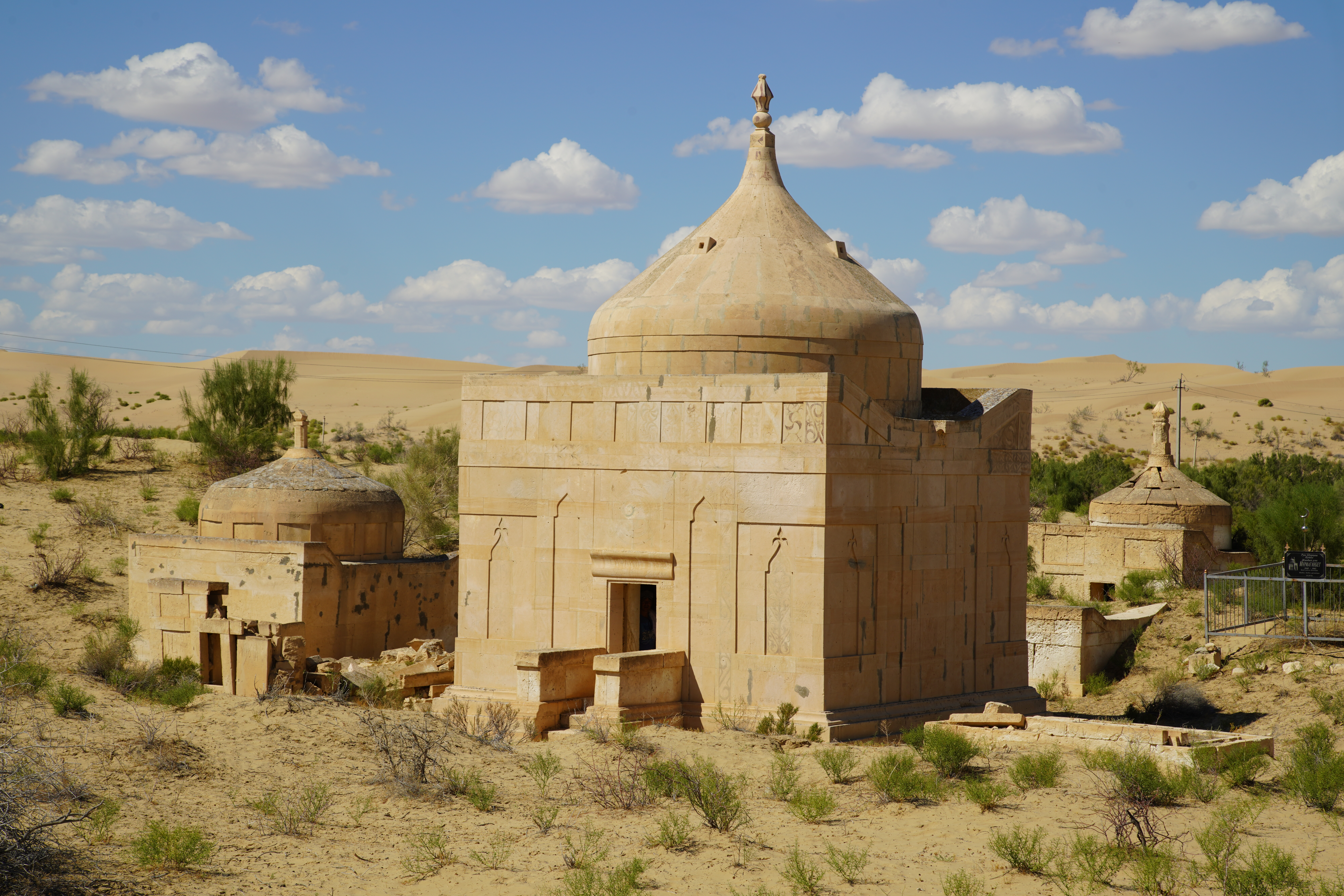
- Senek Necropolis

- Location within Kazakhstan
- Coordinates: 43°22′00″N 53°24′01″E
- Country: Kazakhstan
- Region: Mangystau
- Elevation: 148 m (486 ft)
- Time zone: UTC+5 (West Kazakhstan Time)
  - Summer (DST): UTC+5 (West Kazakhstan Time)

Senek (Kazakh: Сенек, Senek, سەنەك) is a town in Mangystau Region, southwest Kazakhstan. It lies at an altitude of 148 m (486 ft).
