= Mangistau =

Rural locality in Kazakhstan

Coordinates: 43°41′44″N 51°19′34″E

Mangistau (Kazakh: Маңғыстау, Mañğystau) is a selo and the administrative center of Munaily District in Mangystau Region in western Kazakhstan. Mangistau is located in the desert on Mangyshlak Peninsula, 20 kilometres (12 mi) east of Aktau and of the Caspian Sea coast. Population: 14,818 (2009 census results); 12,433 (1999 census results).

== Mangistau Tourism ==
- Mangistau tours 4x4 – travel and off-road tours in Mangistau Region
