= Bautino =

Bautino Баутин باۋتىين
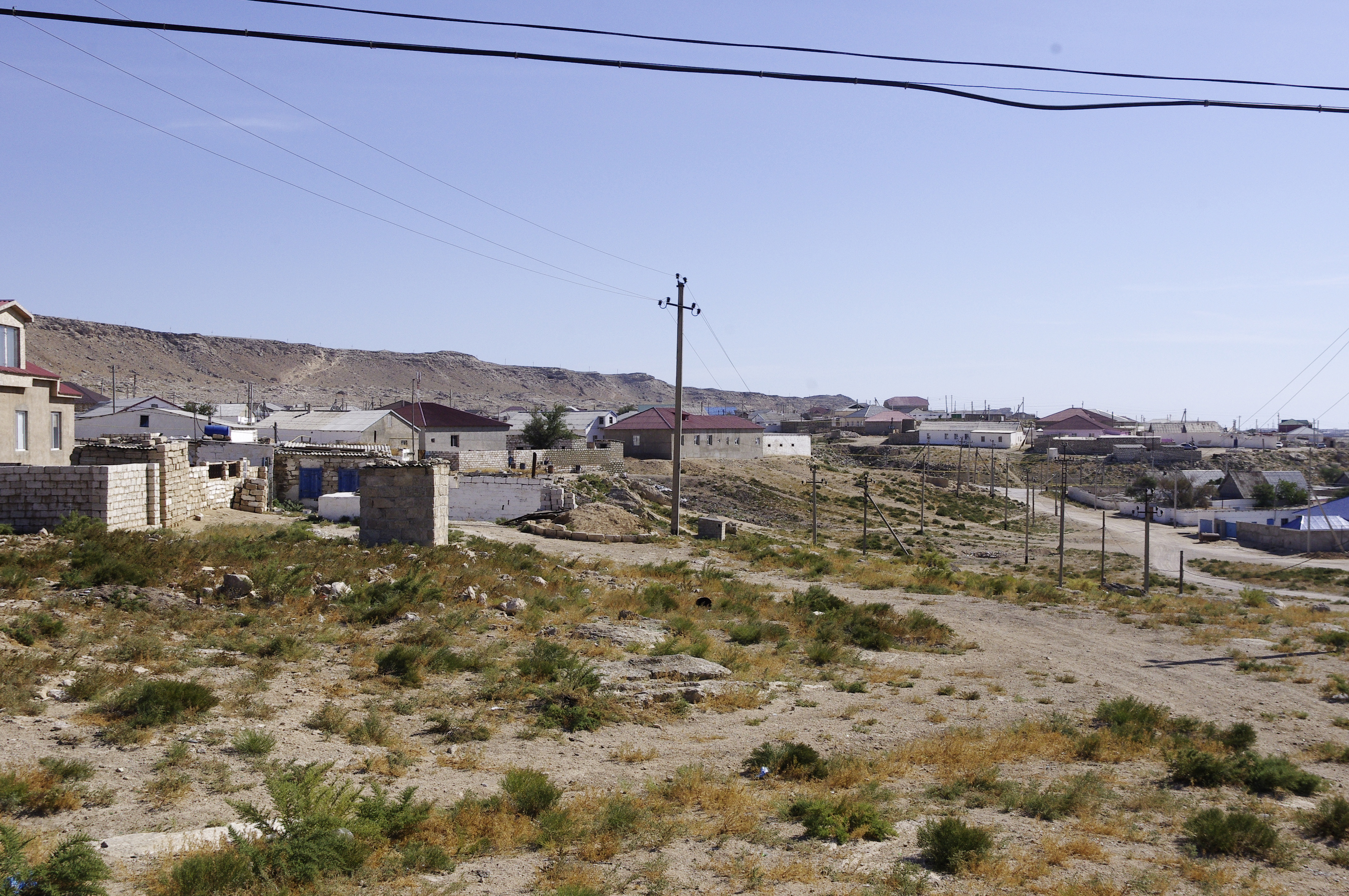

- Location within Kazakhstan
- Coordinates: 44°32′41″N 50°14′47″E
- Country: Kazakhstan
- Region: Mangystau
- Elevation: −28 m (−92 ft)

Population
  - Total: 3,247
- Time zone: UTC+5 (West Kazakhstan Time)
  - Summer (DST): UTC+5 (West Kazakhstan Time)

Bautino (Kazakh: Баутин, Bautin, باۋتىين) is a town in Mangystau Region, southwest Kazakhstan. It lies at an altitude of 28 m (92 ft) below sea level, on the coast of the Caspian Sea, next to Bautino Bay (Kazakh: Бухта Баутин, Buhta Bautin). It has a population of 3,247.
