= Chink (geology) =

Steep encarpments

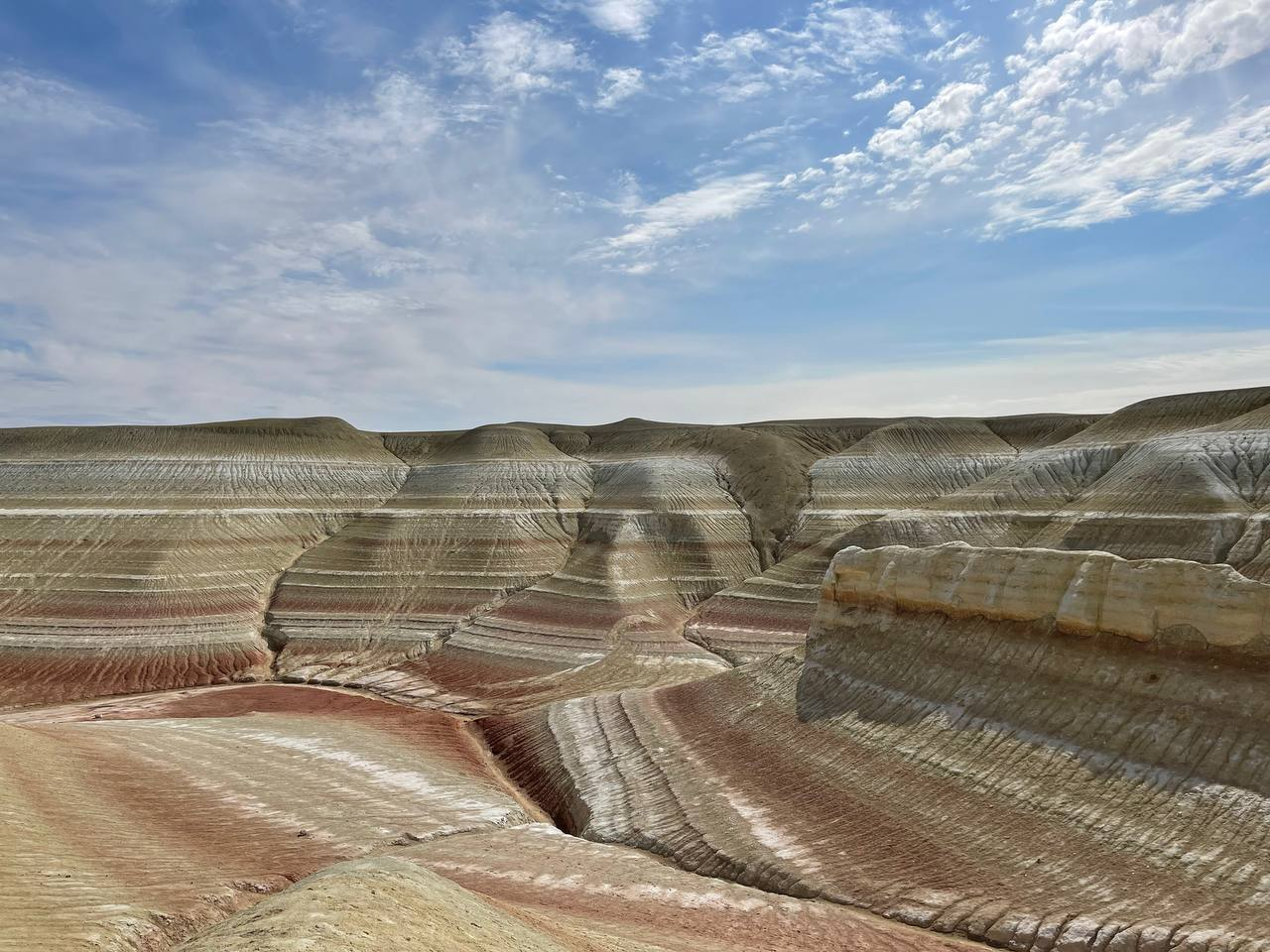
Kyzylkup Gorge, Ustyurt Plateau

Chink (Russian: Чинк) is a regional term in Central Asia for steep chalk and limestone escarpments and cliffs of heights up to 350 m, often around flat-top elevations. They are the result of denudation and abrasion during the regressions of the Caspian and Aral seas. Most commonly they may be found on the Mangyshlak Peninsula (Kenderli-Kayasan nature reserve) and Ustyurt Plateau (Ust'urt Nature reserve). Chinks may also result from tectonic uplifts. They are usually formed when top hard rocks overlay soft rock layers.

Detached chinks are called ostantsy (останцы) in Russian, literally akin to the word "leftovers".

The Ustyurt Plateau is nearly completely bounded by chinks on all sides. In the east it is the former west shore of the Aral Sea, in the south its chink breaks to the Kunya-Darya (Куня-Дарья) alluvial plain and the Uzboy valley, in the west to the Karynyaryk depression and to the North Caspian Sea Karakum sands, and in the north to the Caspian Depression. Ustyurt chinks often have multicolored layers, with colors of pale pink, blue, clear white, and others; and can form fancy landscapes.

== Gallery ==
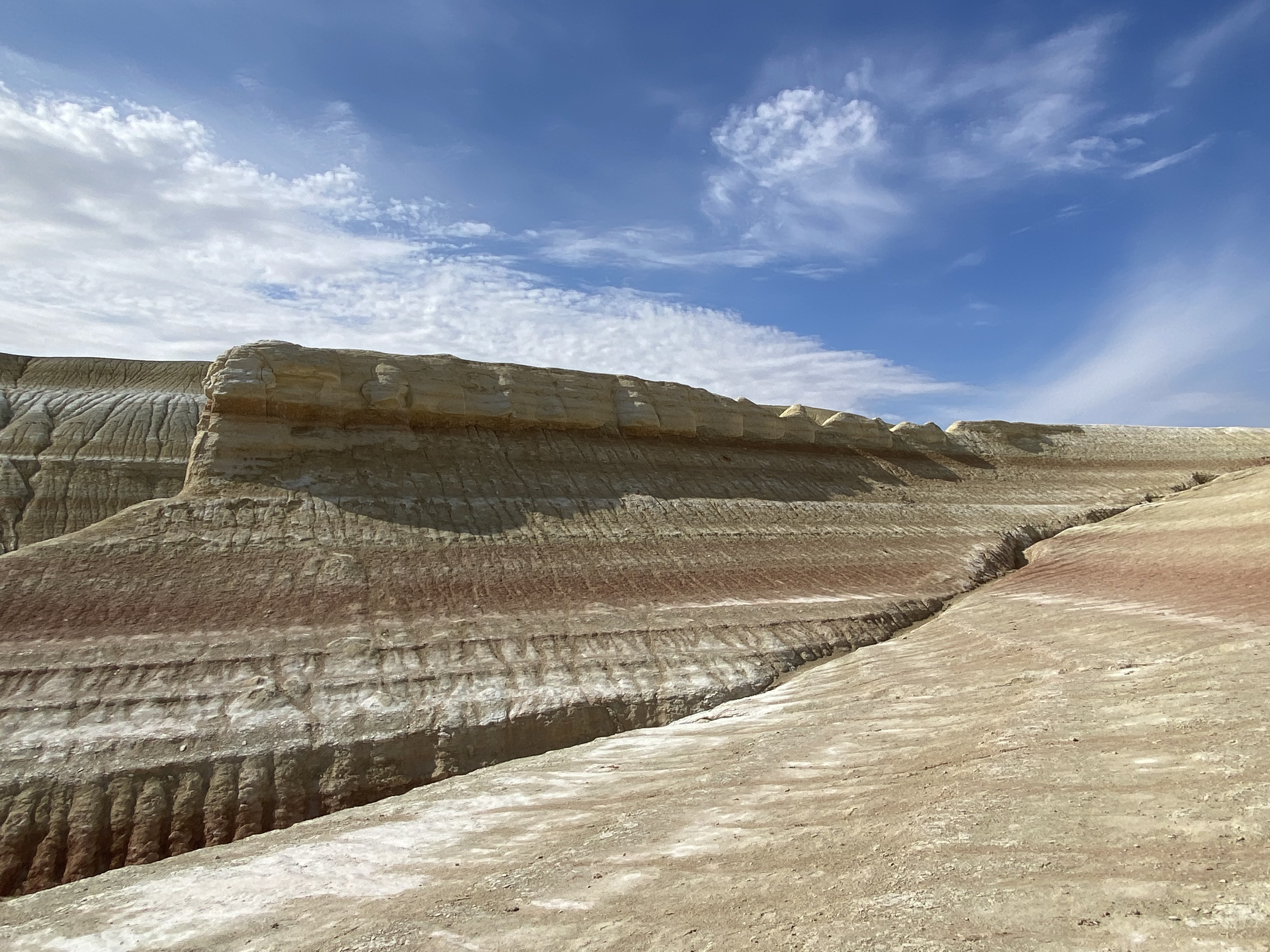
Kyzylkup

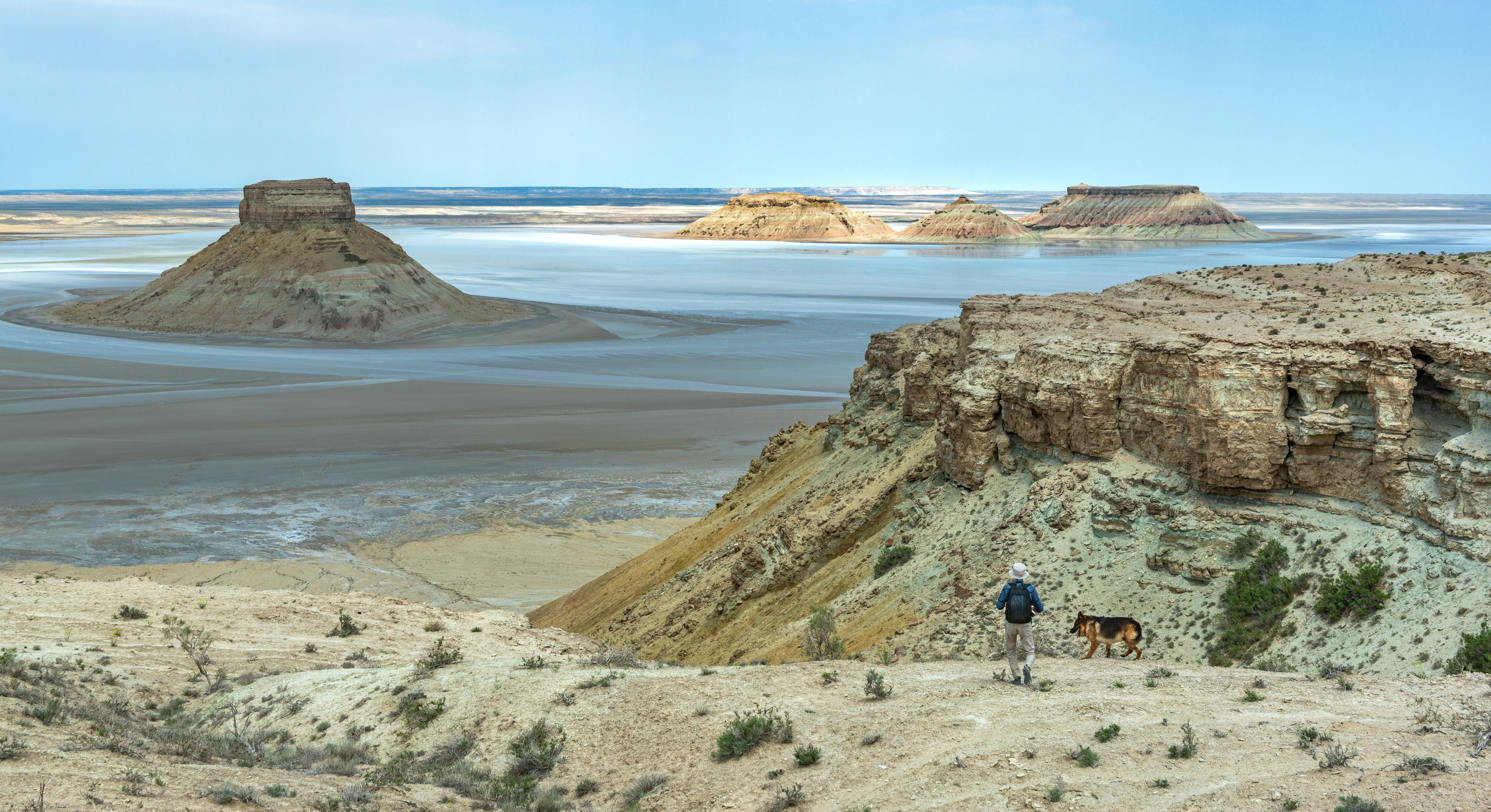
Ostantsy in Kendirli Lake

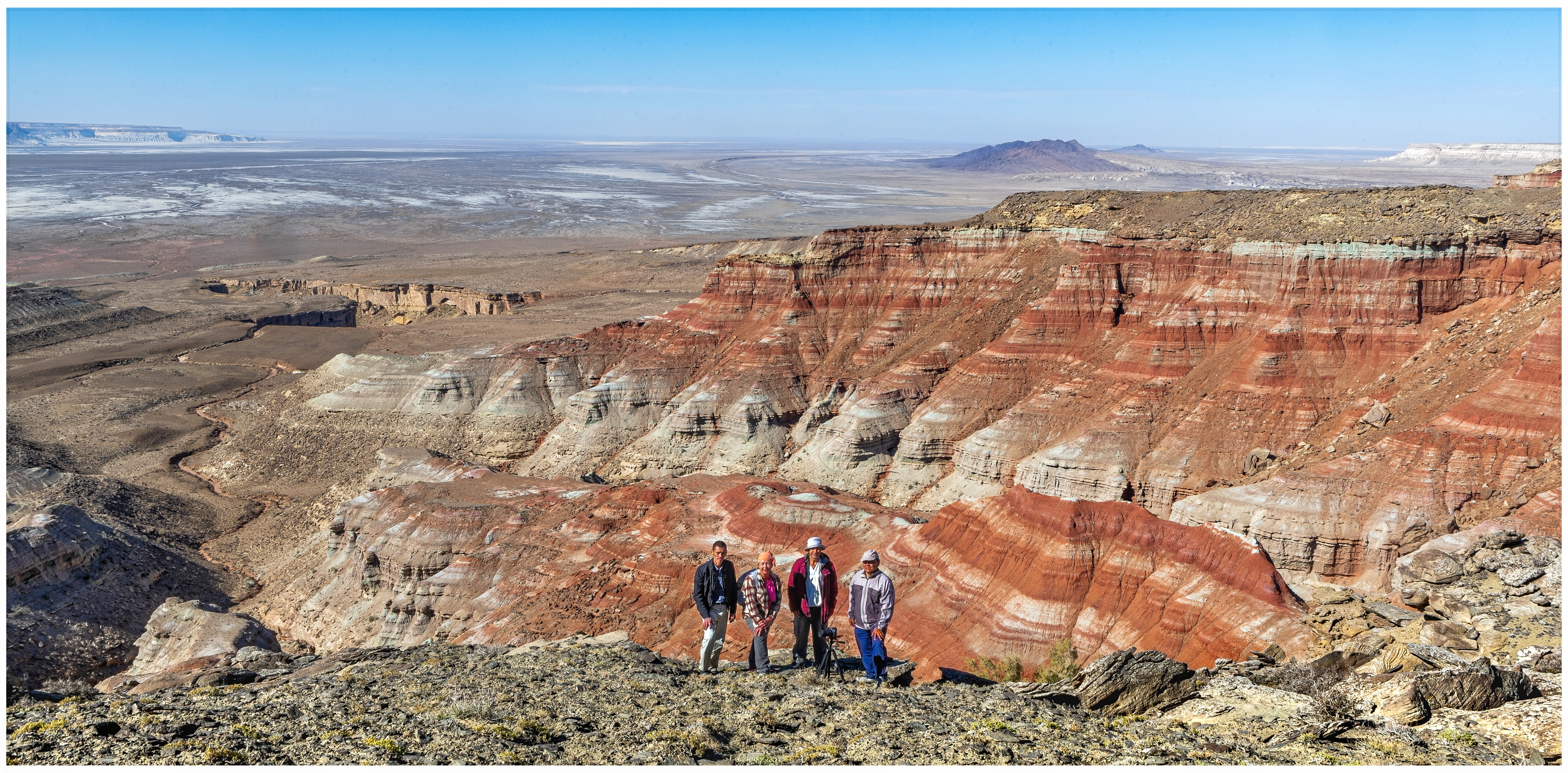
Karakiya District, Ustyurt

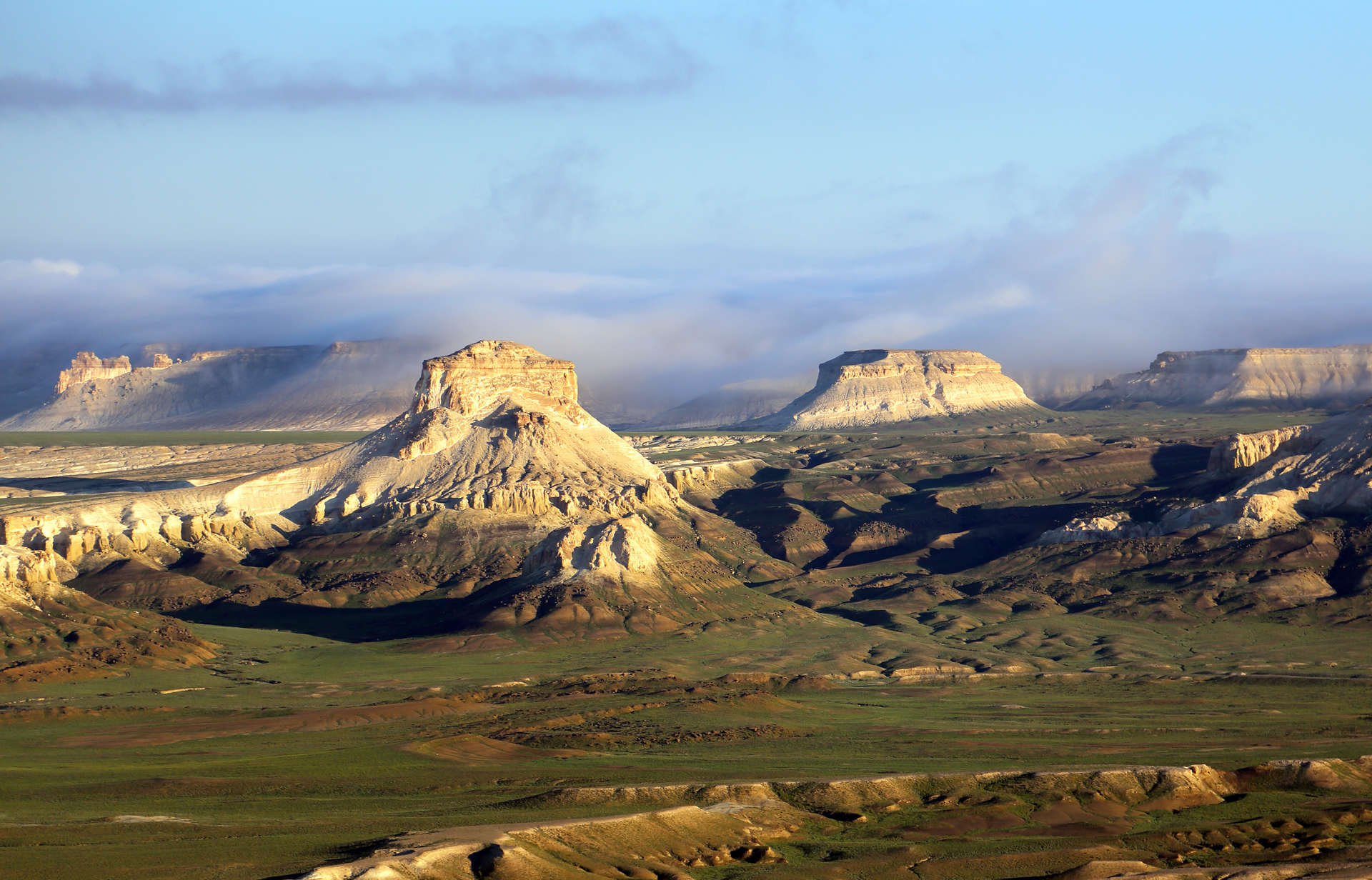
Bozzhyra, Karakiya

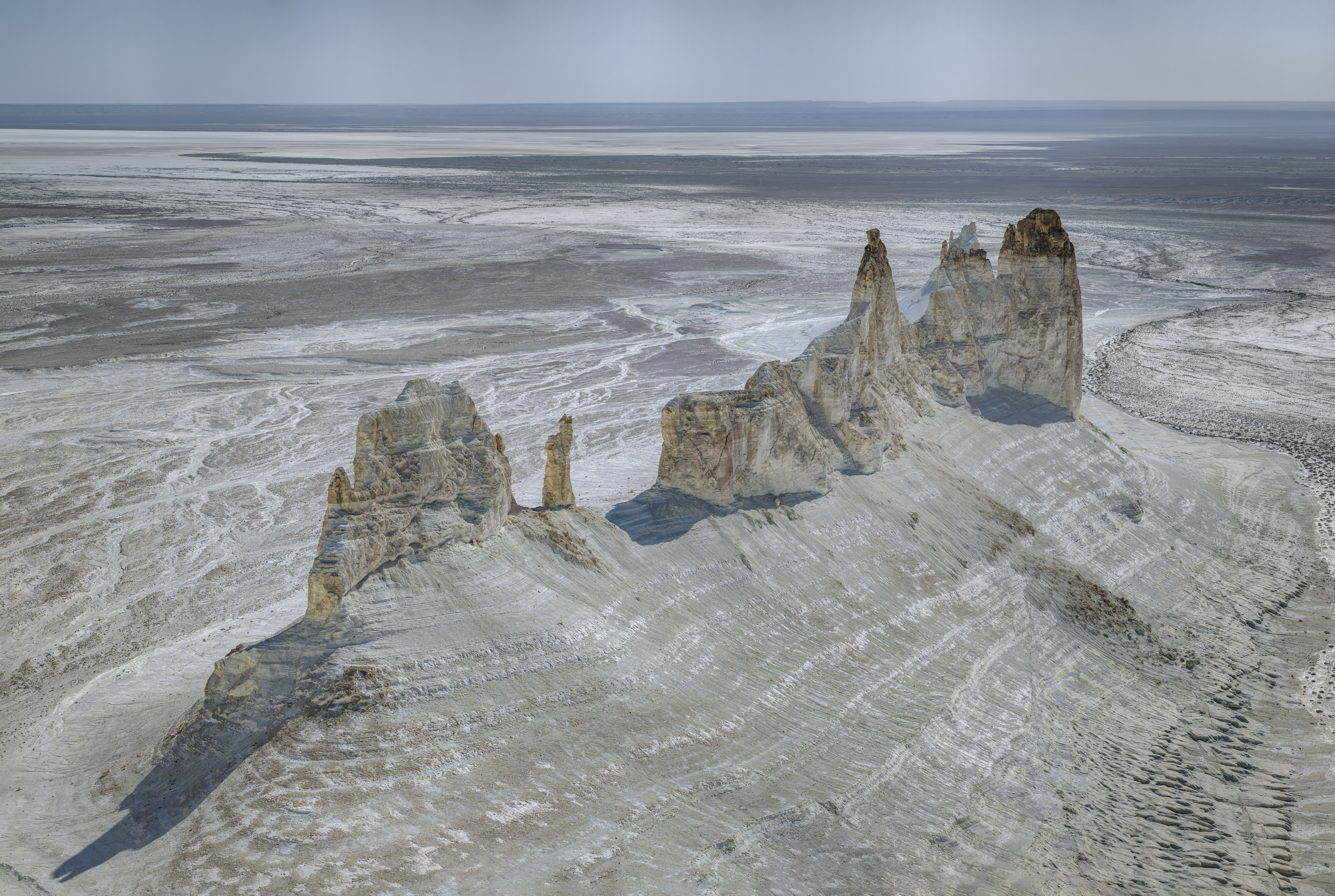
Bozzhyra "fangs"
