= Shakirat Utegaziyev =

Soviet Kazakh physician (1936–1984)

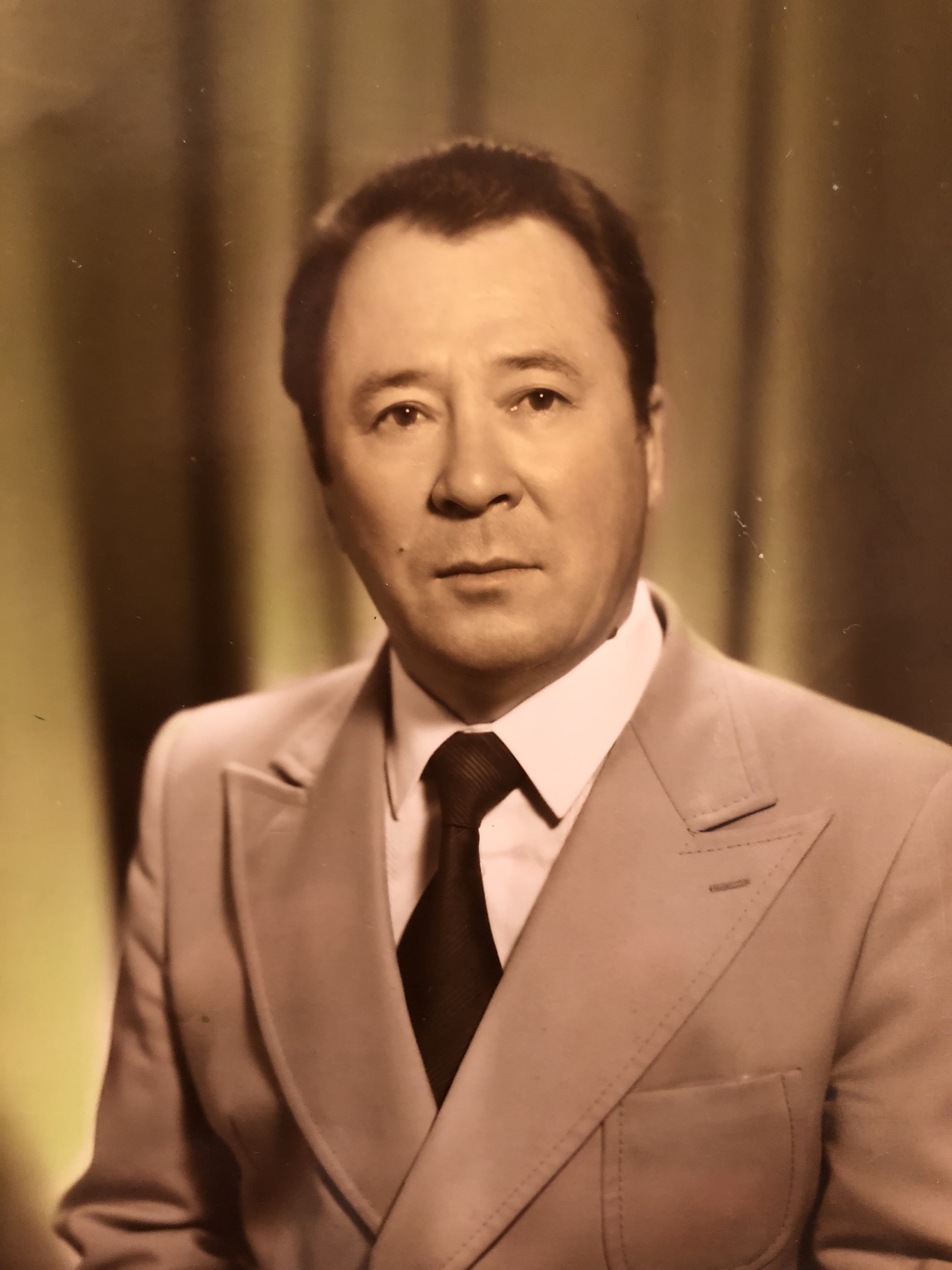
Shakirat Utegaziyev in 1984

Shakirat Nurzhanovich Utegaziyev (Russian: Шакират Нуржанович Утегазиев; 1936–1984) was a Soviet Kazakh physician, best known as the founder and first Chairman of Mangystau's Division of Health and Medicine in the Kazakh Soviet Socialist Republic.

The Mangystau Region, economically prosperous due to its energy industry, officially became an administrative region in 1973 and established its Regional Division of Health and Medicine that same year. Utegaziyev served as its founding and longest-serving Chairman.

== Career ==
During his tenure, Shakirat Utegaziyev initiated the construction and development of the Mangystau Regional Hospital, notable as being the 4th medical complex of its kind in the Soviet Union. Today, the Mangystau Regional Hospital consists of over 25 specialized departments, including cardiology, surgery, gastroenterology, as well as many other diagnostic treatment facilities.

As Chairman of the Mangystau Region Division of Health and Medicine, Utegaziyev facilitated the development, training and education of the next generation of medical health professionals. Utegaziyev created programs where every year, 20-25% of the Mangystau Region’s medical professionals underwent additional advanced training at leading USSR hospitals and medical schools to upgrade their credentials.

== Publications ==
Shakirat Utegaziyev is the author of numerous publications, which are housed in leading medical schools and academic databases internationally, such as Harvard Medical School, Indiana University School of Medicine, the United States National Library of Medicine and JSTOR.

Utegaziyev’s works are also cited in academic publications such as the Population and Development Review.

== Awards ==
Shakirat Utegaziyev is the recipient of awards such as the USSR Health Care Award for Excellence (Russian: Отличник здравоохранения (СССР)), in recognition of professionals who have made significant contributions in their field. The award is currently housed in the History Museum of the Atyrau Region.

Utegaziyev was also awarded the Order of the Badge of Honour (Russian: Орден «Знак Почёта»).

== Legacy ==
Shakirat Utegaziyev’s role in founding and shaping Mangystau’s modern medical and healthcare system is memorialized in a dedicatory monument at the Mangystau Regional Hospital, officially unveiled on July 3, 2017.

In the city of Aktau, Utegaziyev's residence is now commemorated with a Kazakhstan National Register Plaque, placed in July 2009.
