= Munaily District =

Coordinates: 43.7000°N 51.3250°E

Munaily Мұнайлы
- District
- Mūnaily audany
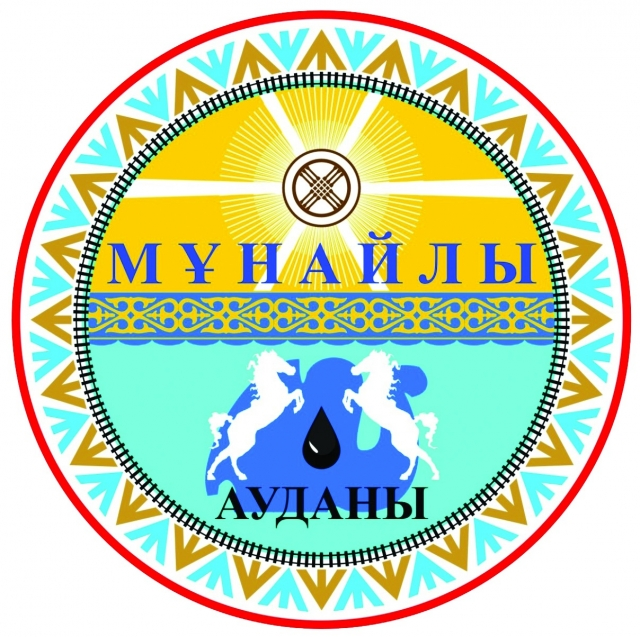
- Seal

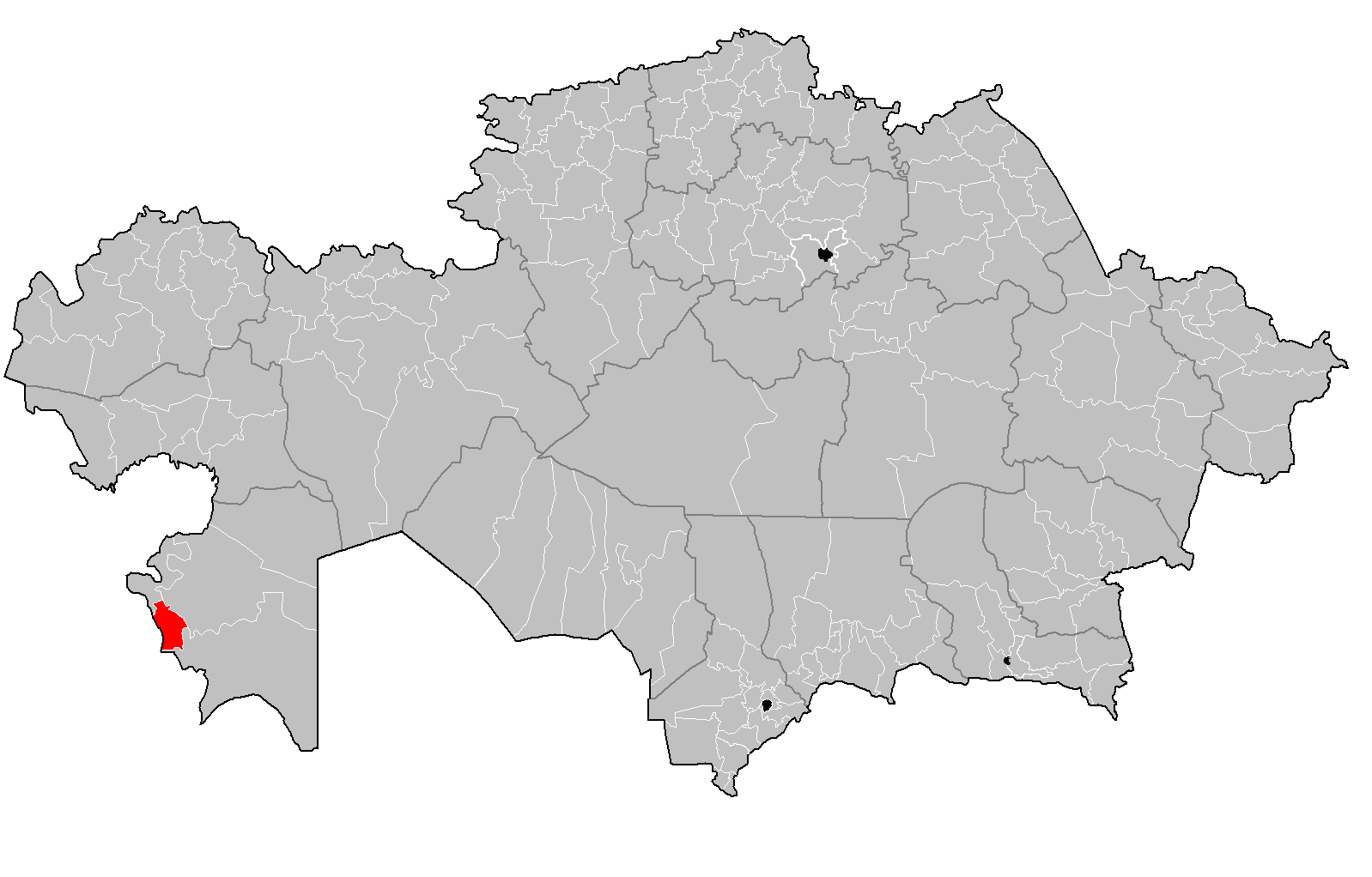

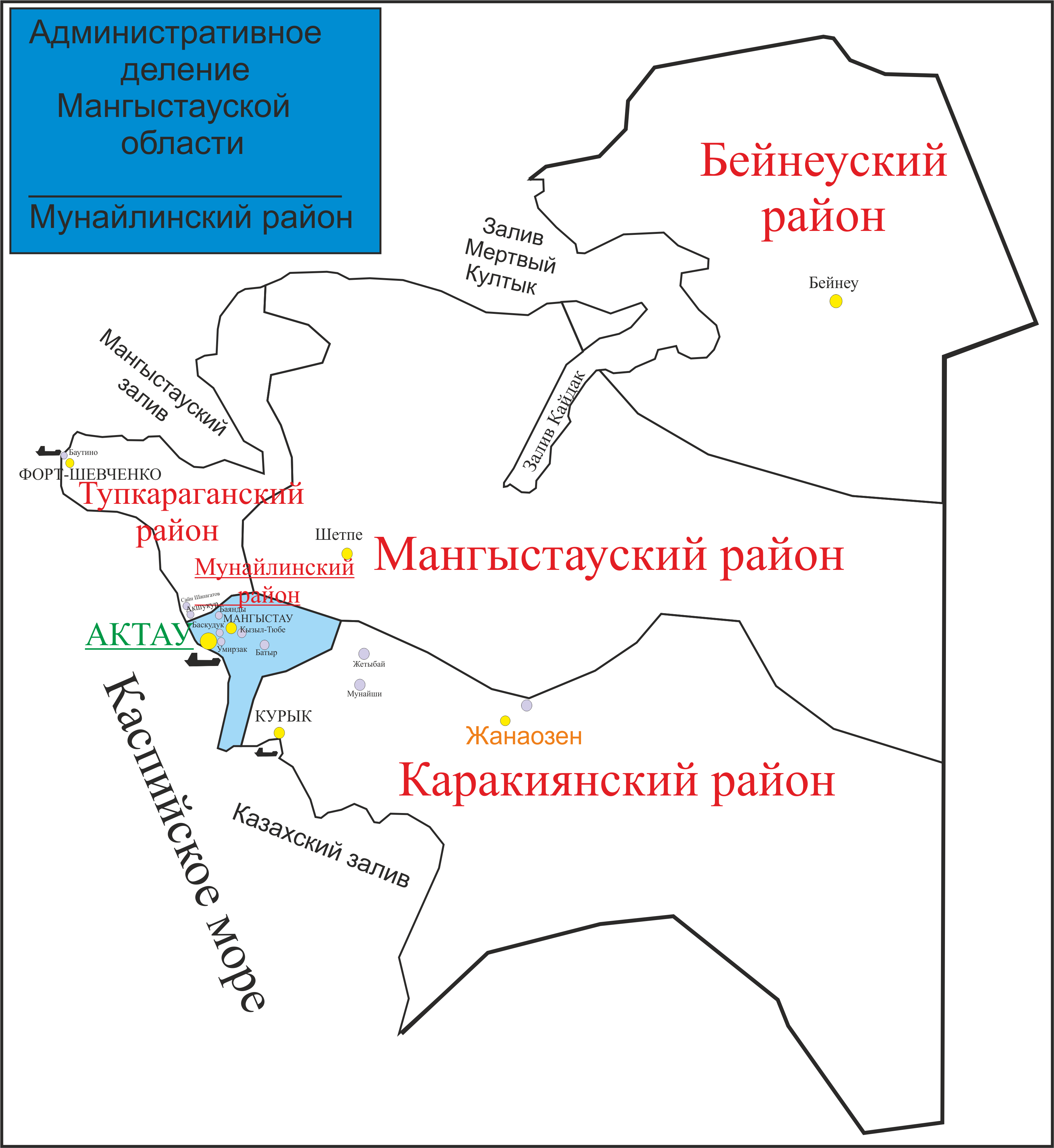
- Country: Kazakhstan
- Region: Mangystau Region
- Administrative center: Mangistau

Government
  - Akim: Kumiskaliev Yerzhan Kopzhasarovich

Population (2013)
  - Total: 112,201
- Time zone: UTC+5 (West)

Munaily District (Kazakh: Мұнайлы ауданы, Mūnaily audany) is a district of Mangystau Region in south-western Kazakhstan. The administrative center of the district is selo of Mangistau.

== Population ==
- 13,300 (1999 census results)
- 74,294 (2009 census results)
- 112,201 (2013 estimate)
