= Sherkala =

Mountain in Kazakhstan

- Şerqala; Шерқала
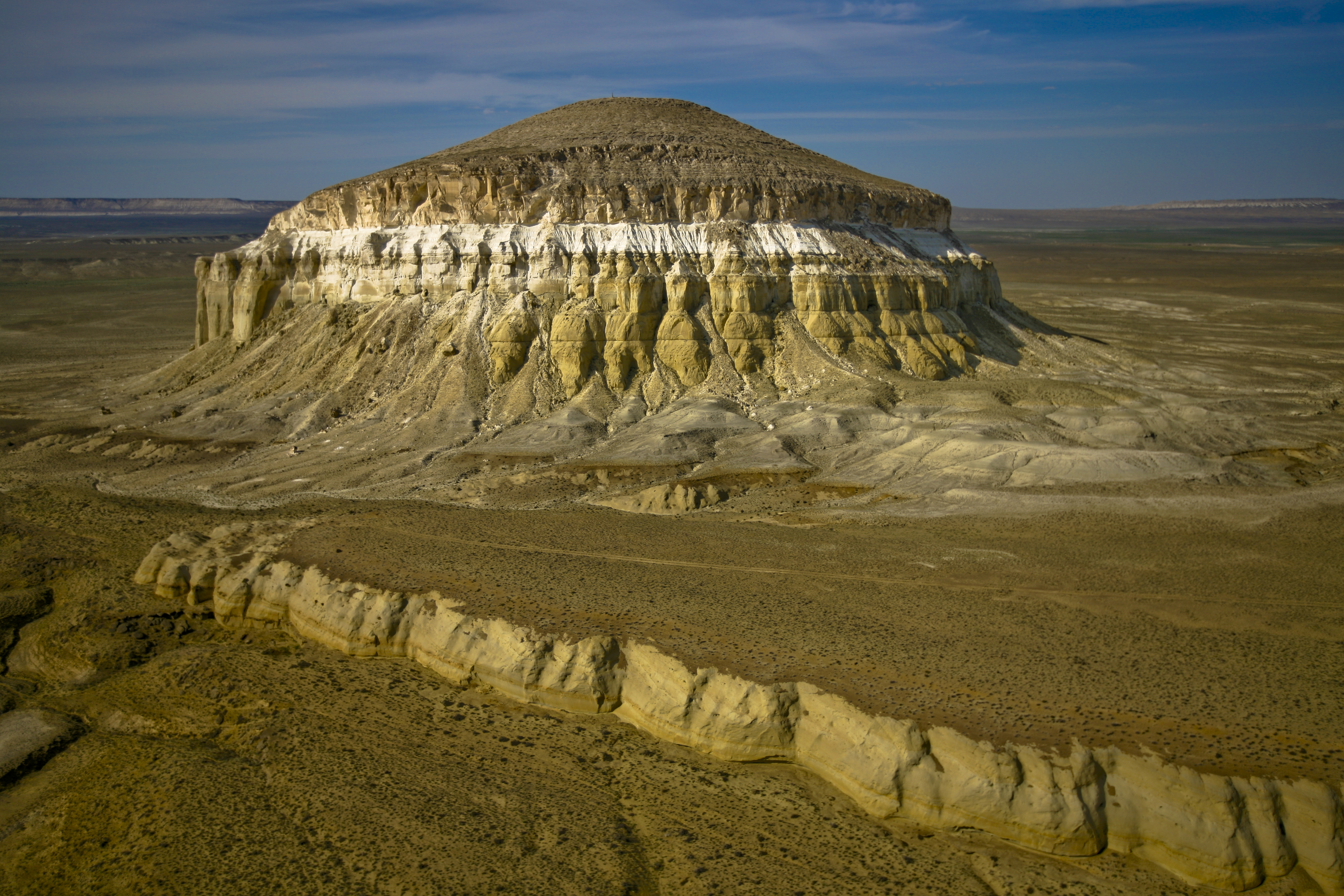

Highest point
- Elevation: 332 m (1,089 ft)
- Coordinates: 44°15′23″N 52°00′22″E

Naming
- English translation: Lion's Castle
- Language of name: Persian

Geography
- Location within Kazakhstan
- Location: Mangystau Province, Kazakhstan
- Parent range: Karatau Mountains

Sherkala (Kazakh: Шерқала, romanized: Şerqala, شەرقالا) is a mountain in Mangystau Province, western Kazakhstan, close to the town of Shetpe (Шетпе, Şetpe, شەتپە). It has been described as looking like a piala, yurt or Sphinx with steep south and east sides and a more eroded northern side.

The mountain is situated between the central and western Karatau Mountains.

Remains of a medieval caravanserei and fort belonging to Jochi, Genghis Khan's elder son are on top and at the foot of the mountain. A tunnel can be used to access the summit.

The ruins of the medieval settlement of Kyzylkala and of Mankashlak (Mankyshlak), a Turkmen town on the Silk Road, are also nearby as is Torysh (The Valley of Balls).

The mountain was, according to legend, besieged by the Sheikh of Khoresm Astsyz after he had conquered Mankashlak. After four months the attackers dug a tunnel sideways through the mountain into the well shaft of the town above, cutting off their rope and forcing their surrender.

The name Sherkala is from Persian شیرقلعه, meaning 'Lion's Castle'.

== See also ==
- Dahae
- Kyzylkala
- Scythia
- Cadusii
