= Kyzylkala =

Medieval trading settlement in Kazakhstan

Coordinates: 42.800°N 59.150°E

Kyzylkala, or Kzylkala (Red Fortress), was a medieval trading settlement on the Silk Road, situated close to the mountain Sherkala in Kazakhstan. The town developed around the 10th century with the arrival of settlers from Khorezm, and declined in the 13th century after the Mongol conquest of Khorezm. This decay was reinforced by changes in the level of the Caspian Sea, which caused caravans to take a new route, bypassing Kyzylkala.

According to al-Khwārizmī Kyzylkala was founded by the invading Sheikh of Khorezm Astsyz after conquering Mankashlak in 1138. Remains of several buildings including fortifications, an extensive caravanserai, mausoleum and three ovens have been identified. Remains of Oguz, Khorezm pottery and stone talc vessels originating from Sultan-Uizdag mountain have been found. But coins have never been found either here or at Sherkala, implying that only bartering occurred.

== See also ==
- Dahae
- Sherkala
- Scythia
- Cadusii
