= Shetpe =

Coordinates: 44°10′N 52°07′E

Shetpe Şetpe شەتپە
- Location in Kazakhstan
- Country: Kazakhstan
- Region: Mangystau Region
- Elevation: 198 m (650 ft)

Population
  - Total: 13 346
  - Summer (DST): +5

Shetpe (Kazakh: Şetpe, Шетпе, شەتپە) is an aul and the administrative center of Mangystau District in Mangystau Region in western Kazakhstan. Population: 12,223 (2009 census results); 10,237 (1999 census results).

== Population ==
According to the 1999 census, Schetpe had a population of 10,237. The 2009 census recorded 12,223 inhabitants. At the 2021 census, the population had increased to 16,762. As of 1 January 2025, the population was estimated at 16,990.

=== Population development ===
Population development
Year	1970	1979	1989	1999	2009	2021
Population	4,974	8,162	10,581	10,237	12,223	16,762

== Climate ==
Shetpe has a cold desert climate (Köppen climate classification BWk).

Climate data for Lamerd
Month	Jan	Feb	Mar	Apr	May	Jun	Jul	Aug	Sep	Oct	Nov	Dec	Year
Mean daily maximum °C (°F)	0.0 (32.0)	0.4 (32.7)	6.2 (43.2)	16.8 (62.2)	24.1 (75.4)	29.0 (84.2)	31.9 (89.4)	32.0 (89.6)	24.8 (76.6)	16.2 (61.2)	8.2 (46.8)	2.6 (36.7)	16.0 (60.8)
Mean daily minimum °C (°F)	−7.3 (18.9)	−7.5 (18.5)	−2.4 (27.7)	5.4 (41.7)	12.2 (54.0)	16.9 (62.4)	19.8 (67.6)	18.0 (64.4)	12.7 (54.9)	5.9 (42.6)	0.5 (32.9)	−3.4 (25.9)	5.9 (42.6)
Average precipitation mm (inches)	8 (0.3)	8 (0.3)	13 (0.5)	16 (0.6)	17 (0.7)	12 (0.5)	11 (0.4)	8 (0.3)	10 (0.4)	12 (0.5)	14 (0.6)	12 (0.5)	141 (5.6)
Source: Climate-data.org
