= Mangystau Region =

Region in southwestern Kazakhstan

Mangystau Region Mañğystau oblysy (Kazakh) Мангистауская область (Russian)
- Region
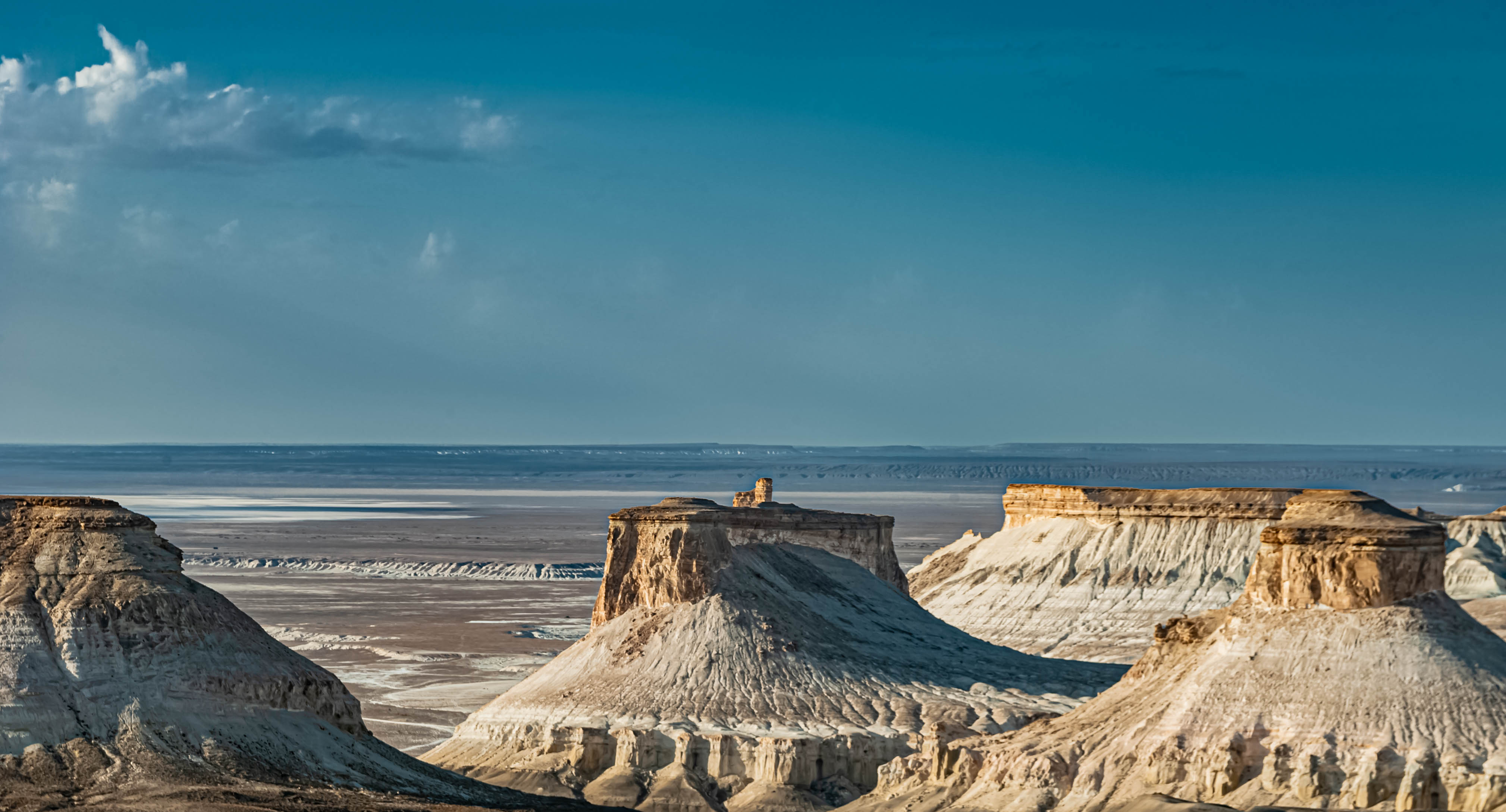
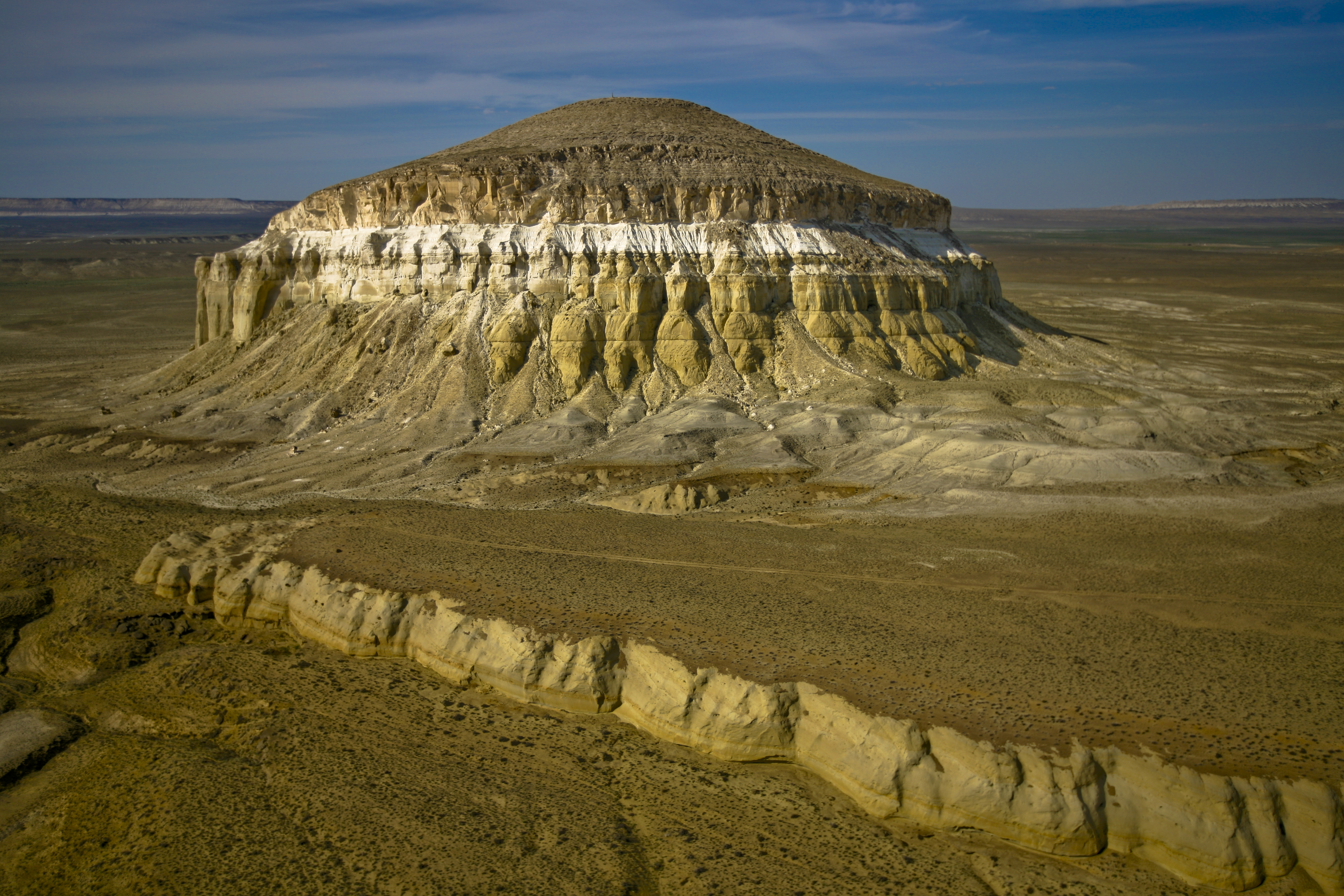
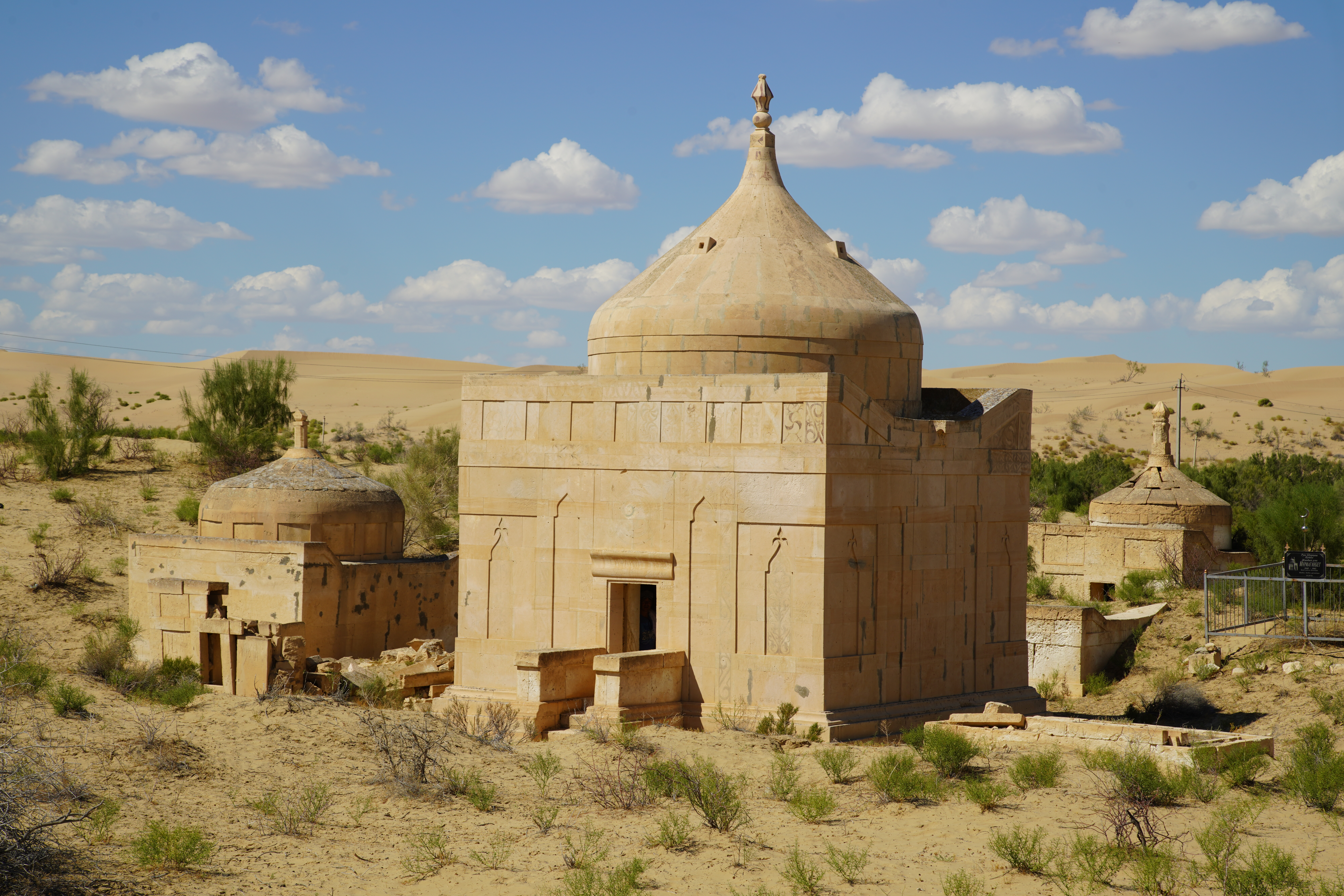
- From the top, Zhabayushkan Reserve, Sherkala, Senek Mangystau Region Coat of Arms

- Coat of arms

- Map of Kazakhstan, location of Mangystau Region highlighted
- Coordinates: 43°48′N 53°15′E
- Country: Kazakhstan
- Capital: Aqtau

Government
  - Akim: Nurdaulet Kilybai

Area
  - Total: 165,642 km^{2} (63,955 sq mi)
- Highest elevation: 556 m (1,824 ft)
- Lowest elevation: −132 m (−433 ft)

Population (2022-01-01)
  - Total: 745,909
  - Density: 4.50314/km^{2} (11.6631/sq mi)

GDP (Nominal, 2024)
  - Total: KZT 5,167 billion (US$ 10.850 billion) · 6th
  - Per capita: KZT 6,491,100 (US$ 13,631)
- Time zone: UTC+5
  - Summer (DST): UTC+5 (not observed)
- Postal codes: 130000
- Area codes: +7 (729)
- ISO 3166 code: KZ-MAN
- Vehicle registration: 12, R
- Districts: 5
- Cities: 3
- Townships: 6
- Villages: 30

Mangystau (Kazakh: Маңғыстау облысы, romanized: Mañğystau oblysy; Russian: Мангистауская область, romanized: Mangistauskaya oblast), formerly known as Mangyshlak (Russian: Мангышлак) from 1973 until 1988, is a region of Kazakhstan. Its capital is Aqtau (a seaport), which has a population of 183,350 (2017); the entire Mangystau Province has a population of 745,909 (2022).

== Geography ==
The region is located in the southwest of the country, and includes Mangyshlak Peninsula. It has much of Kazakhstan's Caspian Shore. It also borders neighboring countries Turkmenistan and Uzbekistan. Mangystau also borders two other Kazakh regions (counter-clockwise), Aktobe Region and Atyrau Region. The area of the region is 165,600 square kilometers. Engineers discovered petroleum in the area in the days of the Soviet Union, drilling commenced, and much of the area was built up around the industry.

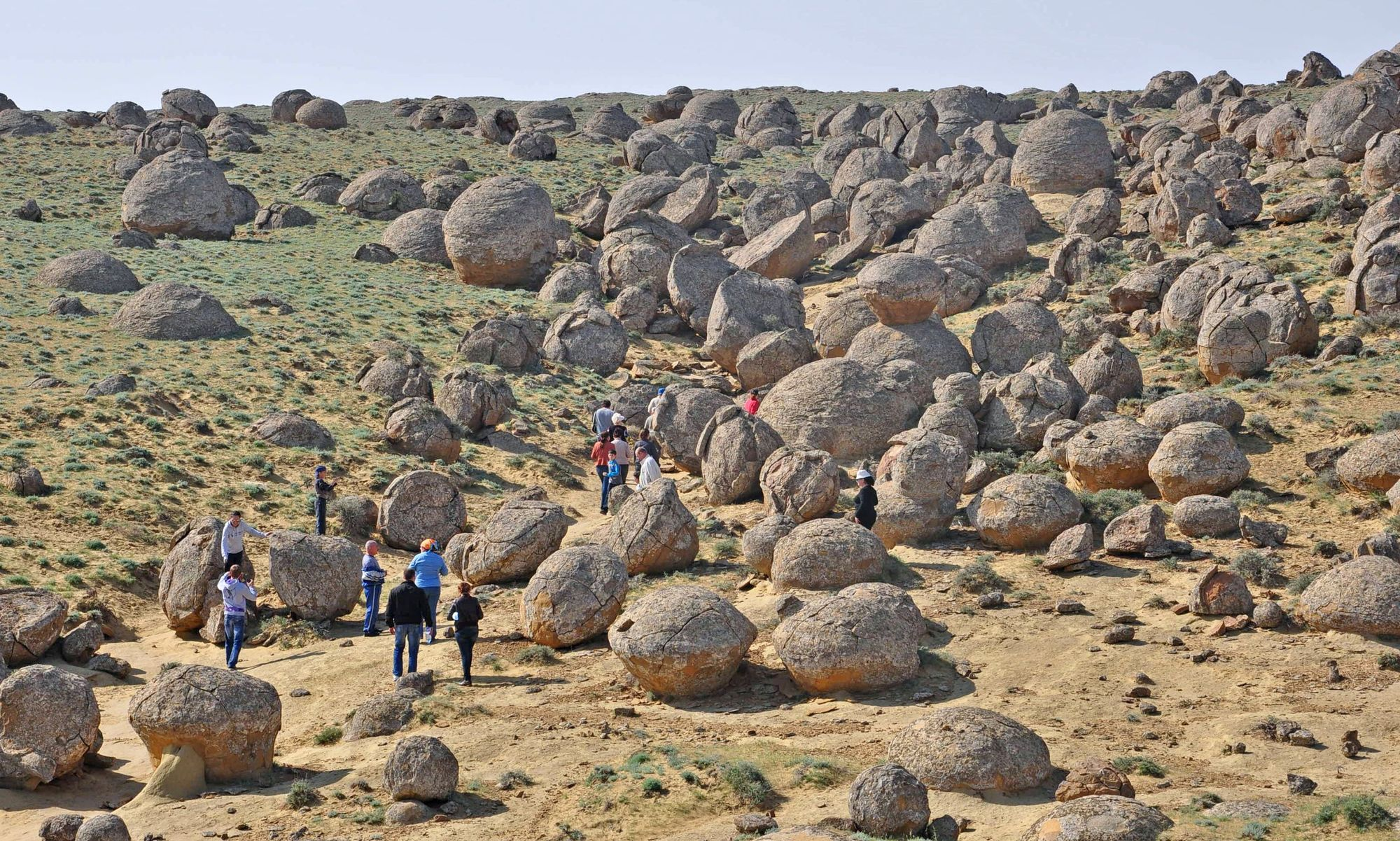
The Valley of Balls

The territory of Mangystau includes varied landscapes and desert lands: Caspian lowland, plateaus (Usturt, Mangyshlak, Kendirli-Kayasan), mountains (Aktau, Karatau), cavities, desert, mountains and mountain ridges. That kind of landscape forms an original multigraded labyrinth, painted with green, yellow, pink and red sediment of loam. The highest point is Otpan mountain at 556 metres (1,824 ft). The lowest point is the bottom of Karagie cavity, 132 metres (433 ft) below sea level.

== Climate ==
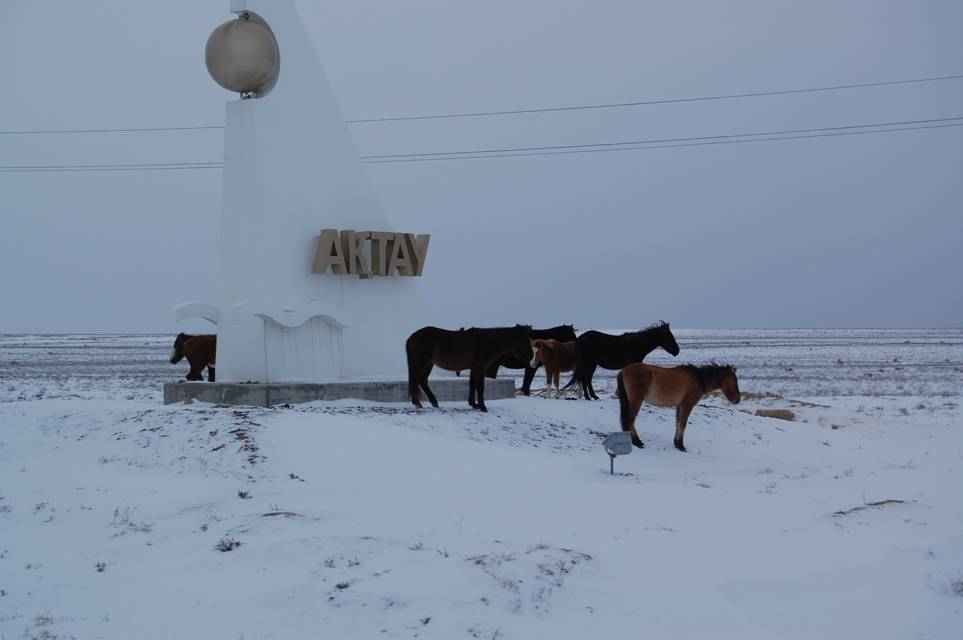
Mangystau Region in winter time

The region has a wide variety of climate conditions. North Mangystau is cold in winter due to the Ustyurt Plateau, the location of the plateau being mainly above sea level. On the whole, the climate is continental with cold winters and mild summers. The average temperature is −3 °C (27 °F) in January and +26 °C (79 °F) in July. The average annual rainfall is 150 mm (5.9 in).

== Paleontology ==
Fossils of marine animals are known from the Late Cretaceous (probably Upper Cenomanian-Turonian) deposits of the southern part of the Mangyshlak Plateau. Found specimens are a dolichosaurian thoracic vertebra and teeth of chondrichthyians: hybodontiform Ptychodus and lamniform Protolamna, Cretolamna, Cretoxyrhina and Hispidaspis. These fishes were mainly pelagic forms, which confirms the deep-sea nature of the ecosystem represented.

== History ==
Historical population
Year	Pop.	±% p.a.
1979	248,842	—
1989	324,243	+2.68%
1999	314,669	−0.30%
2009	485,392	+4.43%
2021	719,559	+3.34%
Source: Citypopulation

The first written sources on Mangystau Region date back to the 9th century AD. According to Arabic geographers, it was uninhabited until the tenth century when groups opposing the Turkmen Oghuz settled and found sources of water and grassland. The mountain called Binkishlah (unidentified) would have marked the border between Khwarezm and the Khanate of the Khazars. These Turkmen were vassals of the Khazars, at the beginning of the thirteenth century when Yaqut al-Hamawi and Ibn al-Athir mention the name of Mankashlagh. Ibn al-Athir tells of a Turkish principality with a medina with the same name as the territory that existed from the late eleventh century. In 1097 a struggle between Kutb al-Din Muhammad, Khwarezm governor of Seljuks and Tugrul Tehghin occurred. In 1127, Atsiz occupied the whole peninsula. During Khwarezmshah rule, it was part of firstly Gorgan province, later Mazandaran Province.

In 1221, the Mongols occupied it. It was later passed to successively Golden Horde, Nogai Horde, Uzbek Khanate and Kazakh Khanate, but its population decreased after gradual drying of the steppe and Kalmyk raids began in 1620. Some Salur and Ersari Turkmens left the region and migrated to Russia.

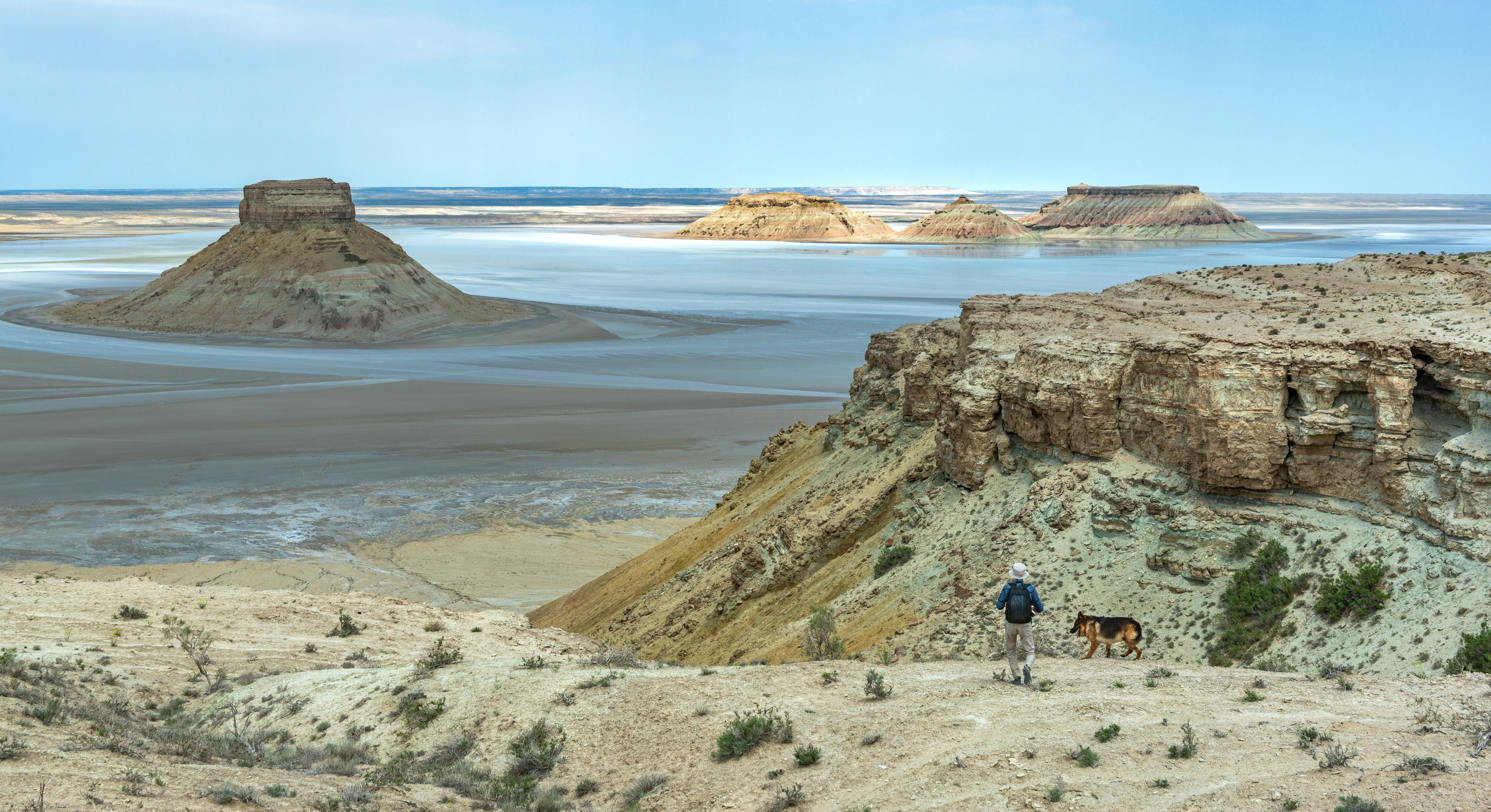
Ustyurt Plateau

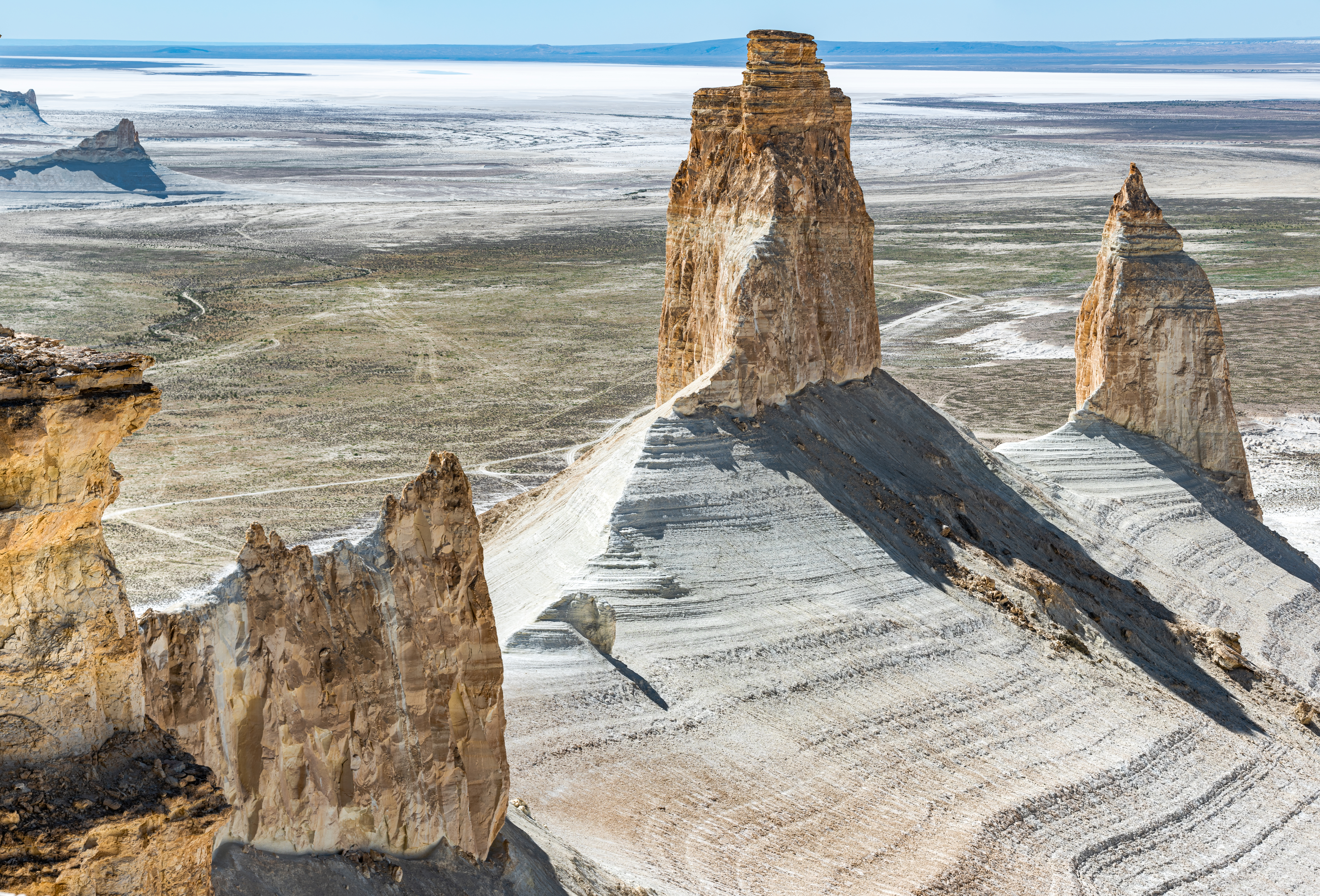
Zhabayushkan Reserve

In 1670, Anusha Khan who was the khan of Khiva asked the Russian government to build a fortress to protect the peninsula for securing trade between Russia and Khwarezm. Puntsuk Monchak and Ayuka (1670–1724) deported most of the Cawdor and Igdir groups of Turkmenistan to the Volga basin. For protecting trade, Anusha Khan annexed it to his territories in 1676 and built a fort at the port of Karagan in 1687.

The Russians under Peter the Great sent an expedition led by the unfortunate Bekovich-Cherkassky, who established three forts on the coast of the Caspian Sea, but they were abandoned after one year. Then there were several Russian scientific expeditions. In 1834 they founded on the south coast of the Bay of Mertviy Kultuk a permanent garrison at Novo-Petrovskoye. This caused a conflict with the Khan of Khiva and an abortive military campaign between 1839 and 1840. During this period, the Bayuli tribe of the Kazakhs settled and the remaining Turkmens left it in 1840 except a group of families of the Cawdor tribe.

The peninsula was subject to conflict between Khiva and Russia; each party wanted to have the Kazakhs. In 1846, the Russians built a fort in Karagan named Novo-Petrovskoye that in 1859 was renamed Fort Alexandrovskiy. Russian domination of it began with the occupation of Krasnovodsk, located in the southern part of it in 1869. At the same time, Russians established Mangyshlak district which was subordinated to the Viceroyalty of Caucasus. The Khanate of Khiva renounced possession of this peninsula in favor of the Russians in 1873. It was attached to Russia as an uyezd of Transcaspian Oblast in 1881.

The fate of the government following the 1917 revolution was in the hands of the Mensheviks. After the October Revolution the Bolsheviks prevailed but were eliminated by British intervention in June 1918. On July 12, 1918, an Interim Executive Committee, which sought to restore Alexander Kerensky, was established in Ashgabat. Bolsheviks took the region in February 1920. On August 26, 1920, the peninsula was included in the Kyrgyz Autonomous Soviet Socialist Republic within the Russian Soviet Socialist Federative Republic. On June 15, 1925, it was renamed the Kazakh Autonomous Soviet Socialist Republic, all within the Russian RFSS. On December 5, 1936, it was elevated to Kazakh SSR, but a narrow strip of the southern coastal bay fronting Kara Boghaz was ceded to Turkmen SSR at the same time.

In 1937, this peninsula became part of Gur'yev Oblast with the Kazakh part of Ustyurt Plateau, and a new department was formed with its capital Fort-Shevchenko. Its current capital was founded as Shevchenko in 1964. In 1973, the area split from Gur’yev oblast and was named Mangyshlak Oblast. This earlier version of the region was liquidated in 1988 but was restored in 1990 with the new name, Mangystau Oblast. After the independence of Kazakhstan, its capital was renamed from Shevchenko to Aqtau.

== Administrative divisions ==
The region is administratively divided into five districts and two cities of regional significance: Aqtau and Zhanaozen. The districts with their populations are:

District	Population 1999 Census	Population 2009 Census	Population 2018 Estimate	Administrative centre
Aqtau	144,798	169,809	186,353	
Zhanaozen	63,337	113,014	147,962	
Beyneu	26,548	46,937	68,285	the auyl/village of Beyneu
Mangystau	29,024	31,215	38,553	the auyl/village of Shetpe
Munaily	13,300	74,294	152,666	the auyl/village of Mangistau
Karakiya	23,437	29,579	37,183	the auyl/village of Kuryk
Tupkaragan	14,225	20,544	29,260	the town of Fort-Shevchenko

Three localities in the region—Aqtau, Fort-Shevchenko, and Zhanaozen—have city or town status.

== Demographics ==
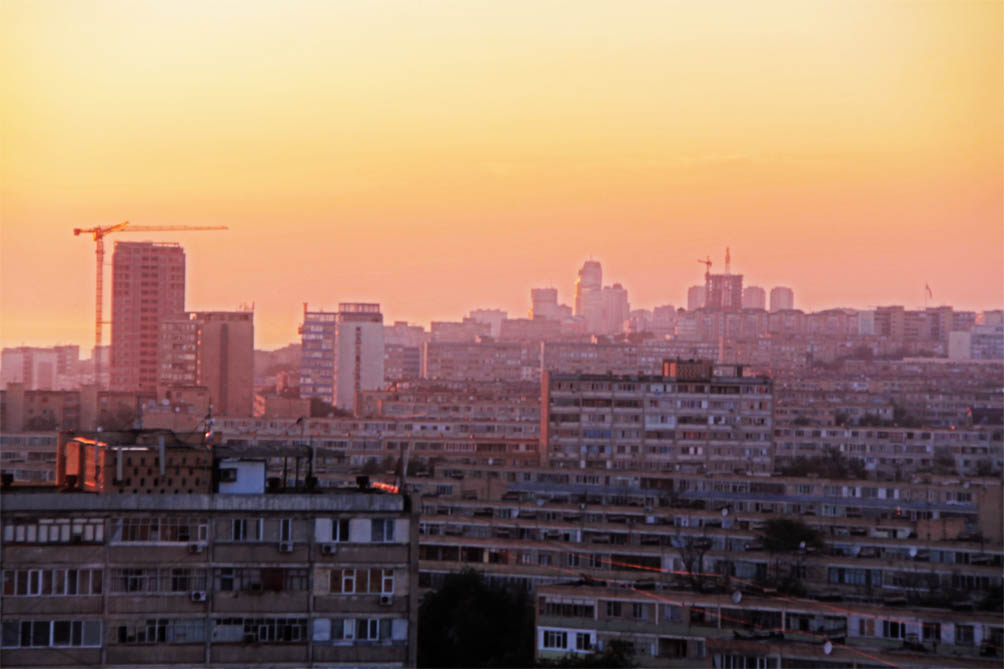
Aqtau is the most populated settlement in the Region.

As of 2021, the Mangystau Region has a population of 735,008.

=== Ethnicity ===
Ethnic groups (2020):

- Kazakh: 91.22%
- Russian: 5.21%
- Azerbaijani: 0.90%
- Others: 2.67%

=== Religion ===
Religion	Population	%
Islam	508,701	69.21
Christianity	30,967	4.21
No Religion	32,191	4.38
Buddhism	112	0.02
Judaism	132	0.02
Other Religion	663	0.09
Not Stated	162,242	22.07

== Notable people from the Mangystau Region ==
- Abish Kekilbayev, Kazakh and Soviet politician
- Bekzad Nurdauletov, Kazakh boxer
- Shakirat Utegaziyev, Kazakh and Soviet physician
