= Religion and the Russian invasion of Ukraine =

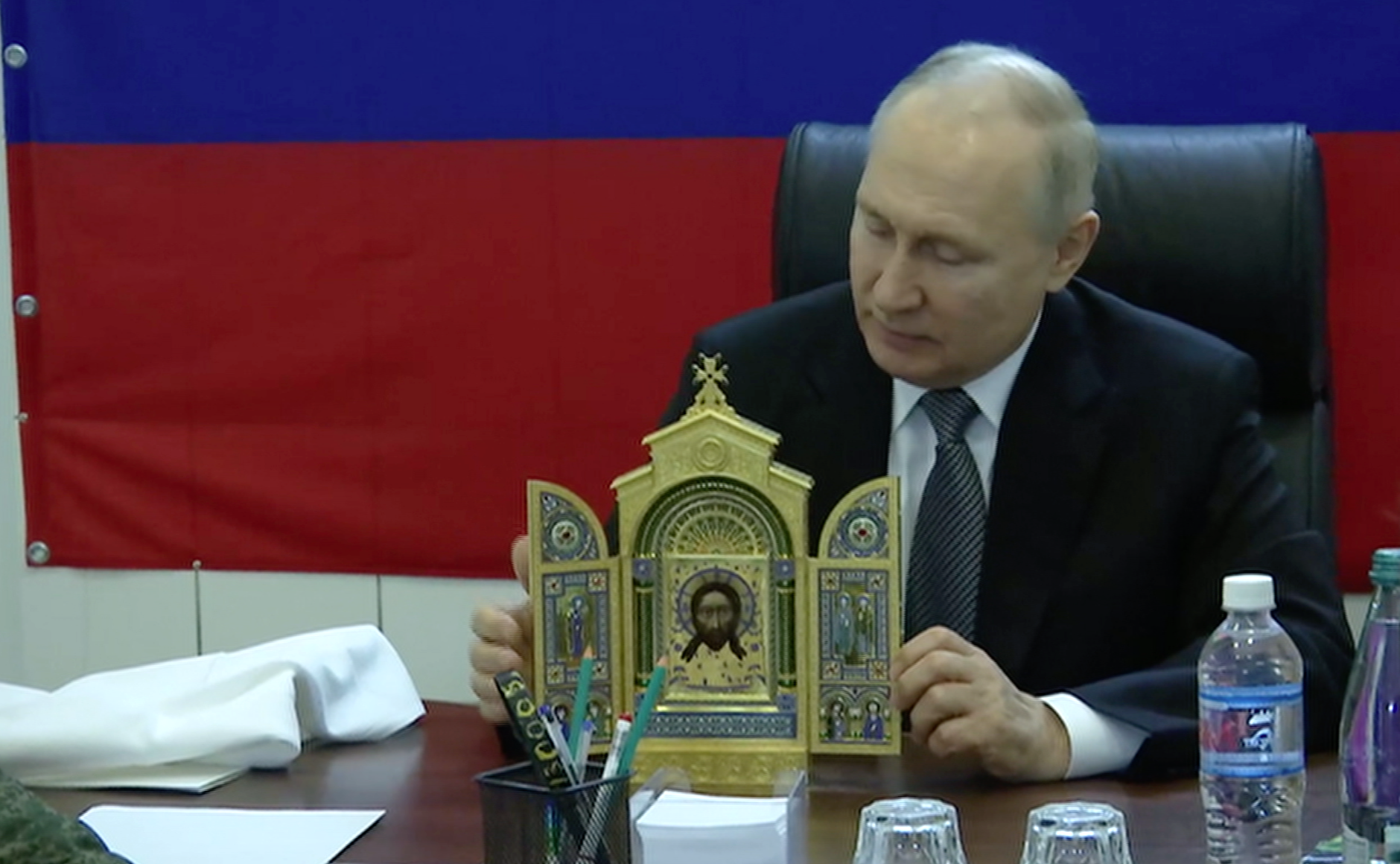
Russian president Vladimir Putin presenting service personnel a copy of an icon while visiting the military headquarters in occupied Kherson Oblast on Easter, April 17, 2023

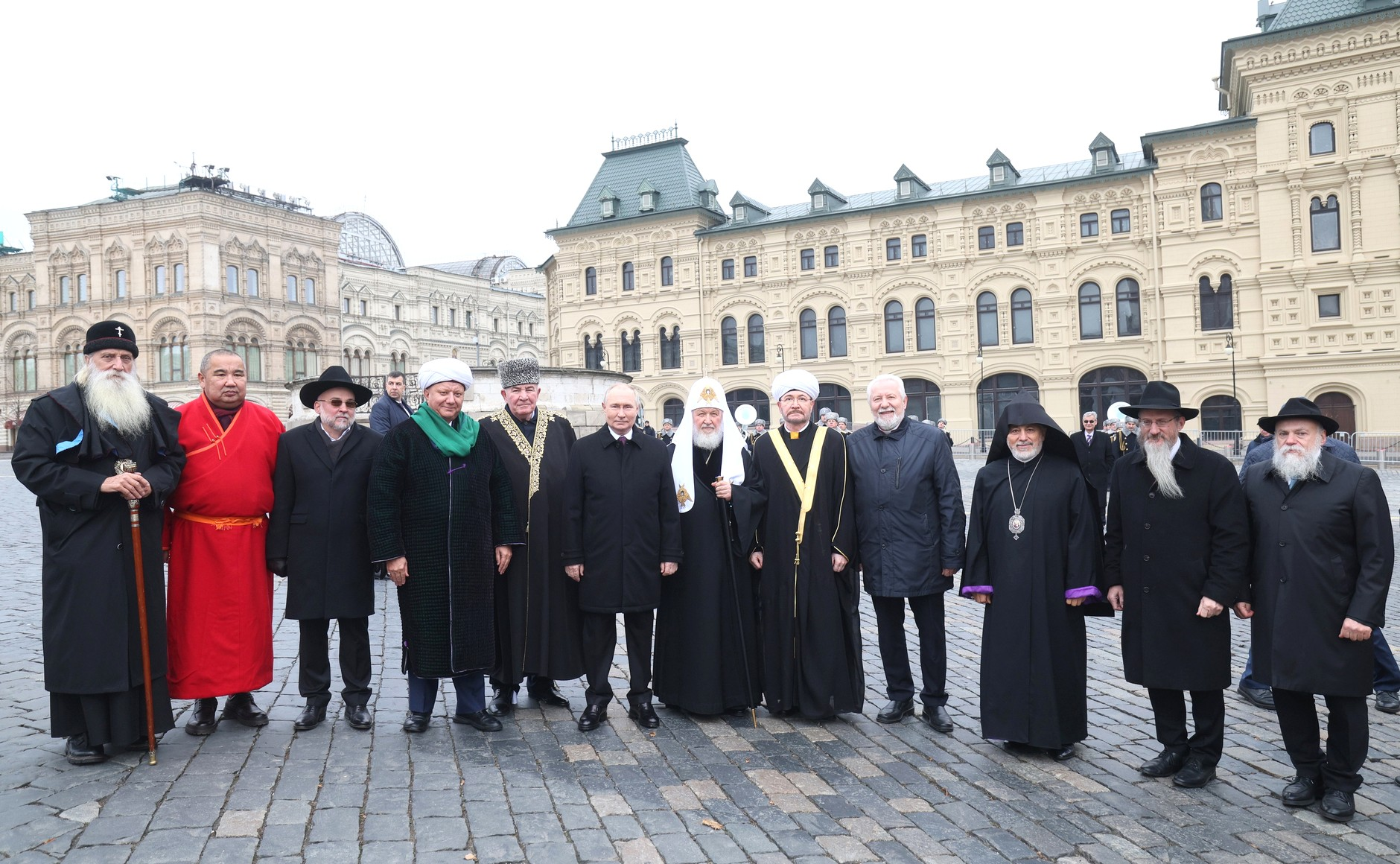
Putin with Russia's religious leaders during the official celebrations of the National Unity Day, 2023

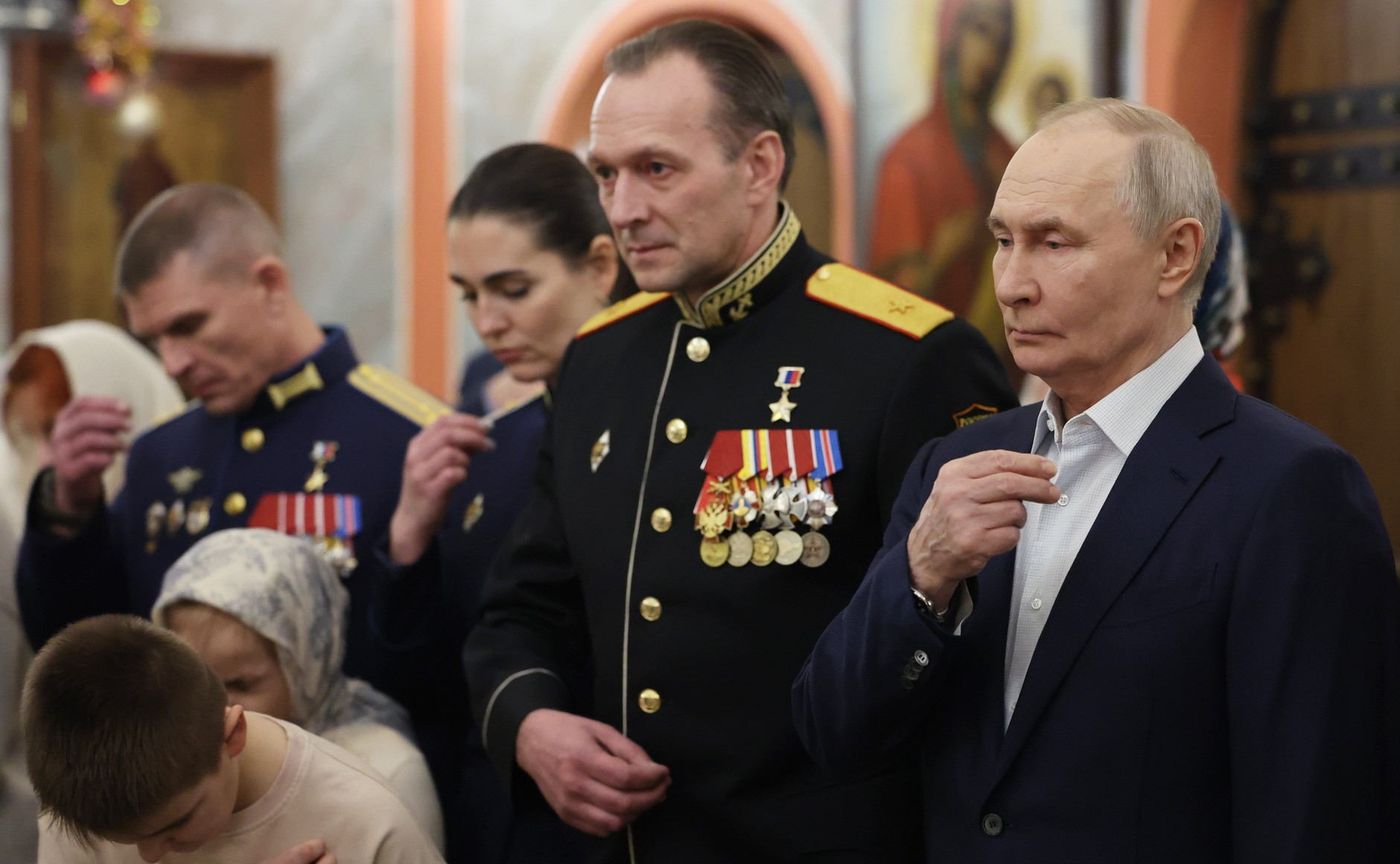
Putin among military personnel during a Christmas service at the St George's Church in Moscow Oblast, January 7, 2026

The role of religion in the Russian invasion of Ukraine, along with the impact the invasion has had on religion, have attracted significant attention. Peter Mandaville of the United States Institute of Peace has stated that "the conflict in Ukraine is not only a matter of horrible violence, but also a conflict with deeply rooted religious significance."

== Orthodox Christianity ==
=== Russian Orthodox Church ===
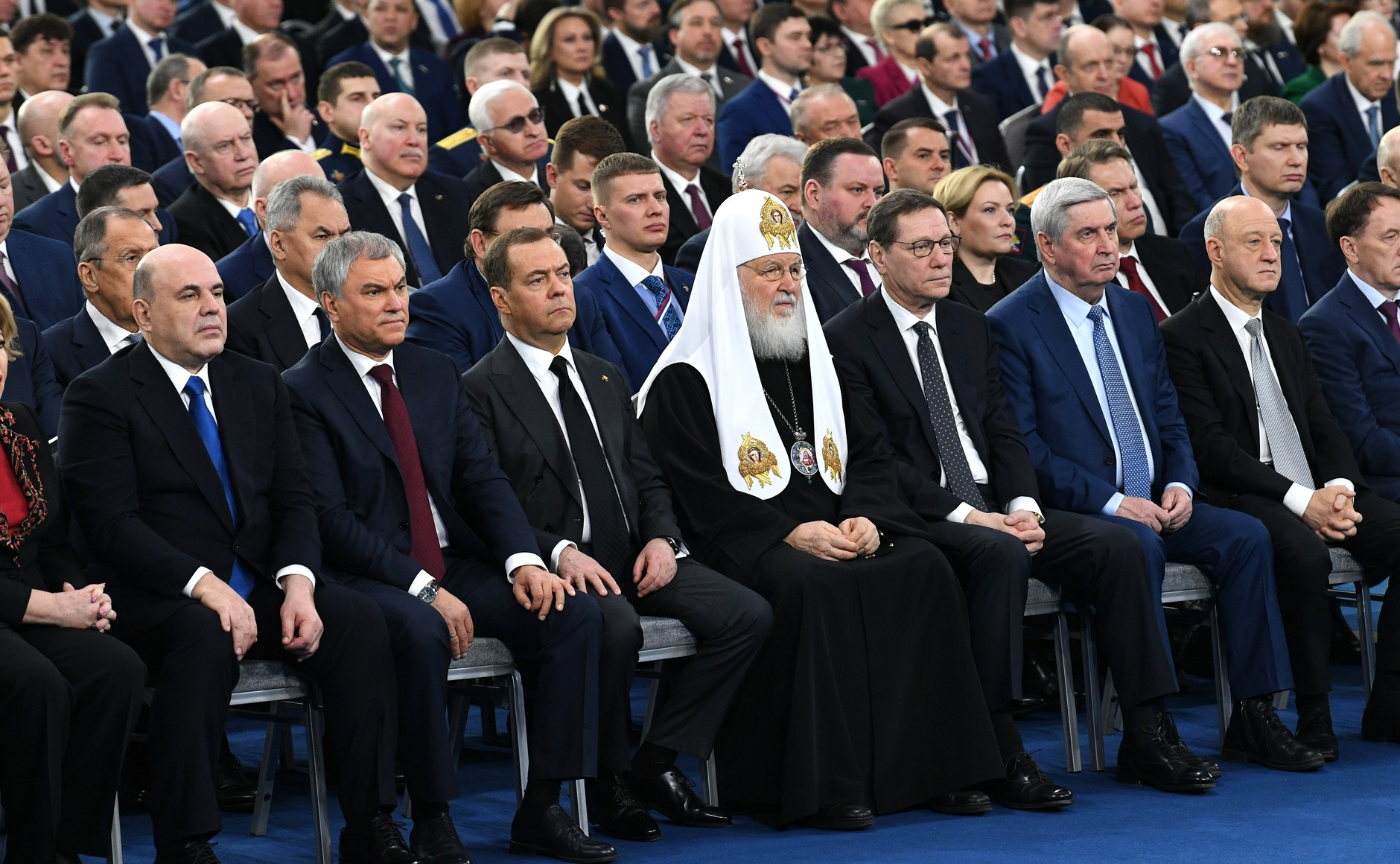
Patriarch Kirill of Moscow with prominent figures of the Putin regime during Putin's Presidential Address to the Federal Assembly on 21 February 2023

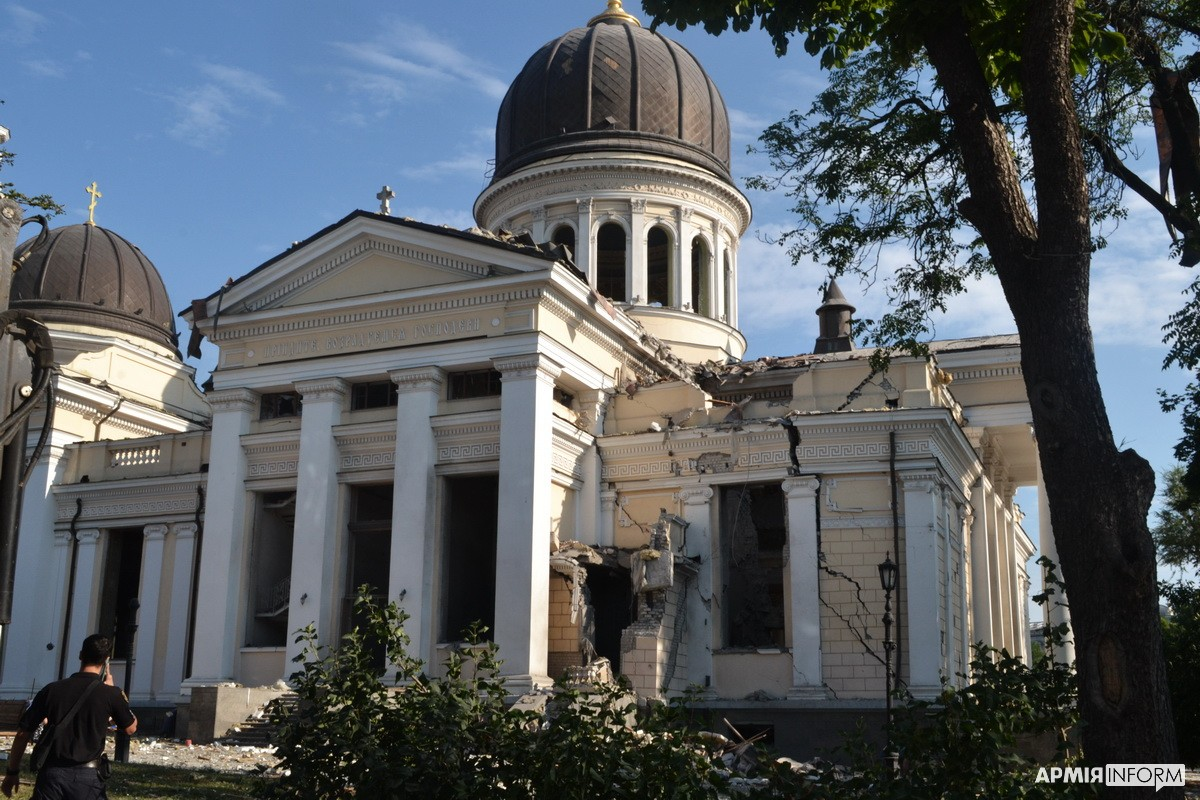
Transfiguration Cathedral in Odesa after Russian airstrikes on the night of 23 July 2023

Patriarch Kirill of Moscow, the head of the Russian Orthodox Church (ROC), has been described by many commentators as supporting the invasion. In a Forgiveness Sunday sermon on 6 March, he stated that the invasion would determine "which side of God humanity will be on," saying that Western governments were attempting to destroy the separatist Donetsk People's Republic and Luhansk People's Republic for rejecting Western "so-called values," such as LGBT+ rights.

In March 2024, the World Russian People's Council, led by Patriarch Kirill, released a document declaring the Russian invasion of Ukraine a "Holy War". It said that "the entire territory of present-day Ukraine should be included in the area of Russia's exclusive influence", and claimed that Ukrainians and Belarusians are solely "sub-ethnic groups of the Russians", referencing the "triunity of the Russian people". According to the Centre for Eastern Studies, the document portrays the Western world as "evil" and the "main adversary", instead of Ukraine, and claims that the West has replaced Christianity with Satanism. In response, Ukrainian Parliament Commissioner for Human Rights Dmytro Lubinets announced an appeal to the United Nations Economic and Social Council against the World Russian People's Council for genocidal rhetoric against Ukraine.

However, some priests in the Russian Orthodox Church have publicly opposed the invasion, with some facing arrest under the new Russian war censorship laws criminalising "discrediting" the armed forces. In Kazakhstan, Russian Orthodox priest Iakov Vorontsov, who was one of about 300 clergy who signed an open letter condemning the invasion of Ukraine, was forced to resign. Russian former priest-monk Ioann Kurmoyarov condemned the invasion and was sentenced to three years in prison for, among other things, telling Russian troops they would not go to heaven.

Kristina Stoeckl of the University of Innsbruck has stated that "this war and the justifications given by the Russian president and the head of the church for the military aggression have made clear how closely the Orthodox Church and the state are linked in Russia." Georg Michels of the University of California, Riverside has argued that "the Russian Orthodox Church is providing much of the symbolism and ideology that Putin has used to cement his popularity" and that this symbolism "derives from the Kremlin’s mythologization of Russia’s historical past." The links between the Russian Orthodox Church and the Russian government under Vladimir Putin have led some commentators to describe the invasion as a religious war.

Some commentators have pointed to Russian Christian nationalism as playing a role in the Russian government's motivations for the invasion. Jason Stanley of Yale University argued that the invasion was in part motivated by antisemitism, saying that Putin was "the leader of Russian Christian nationalism" and "has come to view himself as the global leader of Christian nationalism, and is increasingly regarded as such by Christian nationalists around the world." Mark Silk of Trinity College has argued that it would be an exaggeration to call the invasion a religious war, but that "there can be no doubt that, under Putin, the Russian Orthodox Church has resumed its czarist role as an arm of state policy," calling it the political religion of Russian Orthodoxy nationalism.

Dozens of Russian Orthodox priests who refuse to publicly pray for military victory over Ukraine have been punished, including via defrocking, since Patriarch Kirill has made such prayers mandatory. Priest Alexey Uminsky, who had served as a rector at the Church of the Life-Giving Holy Trinity in Moscow for 30 years and presided over the funeral of former Soviet President Mikhail Gorbachev, was dismissed and defrocked in 2024 for refusing to recite "Prayer for Holy Rus'". Patriarch Kirill has mandated the "Prayer for the Restoration of Peace" to be read at the end of every church service, and a priest, Ioann Koval, was defrocked for replacing the word "victory" in the prayer with "peace".

=== Splits within the Russian Orthodox Church ===
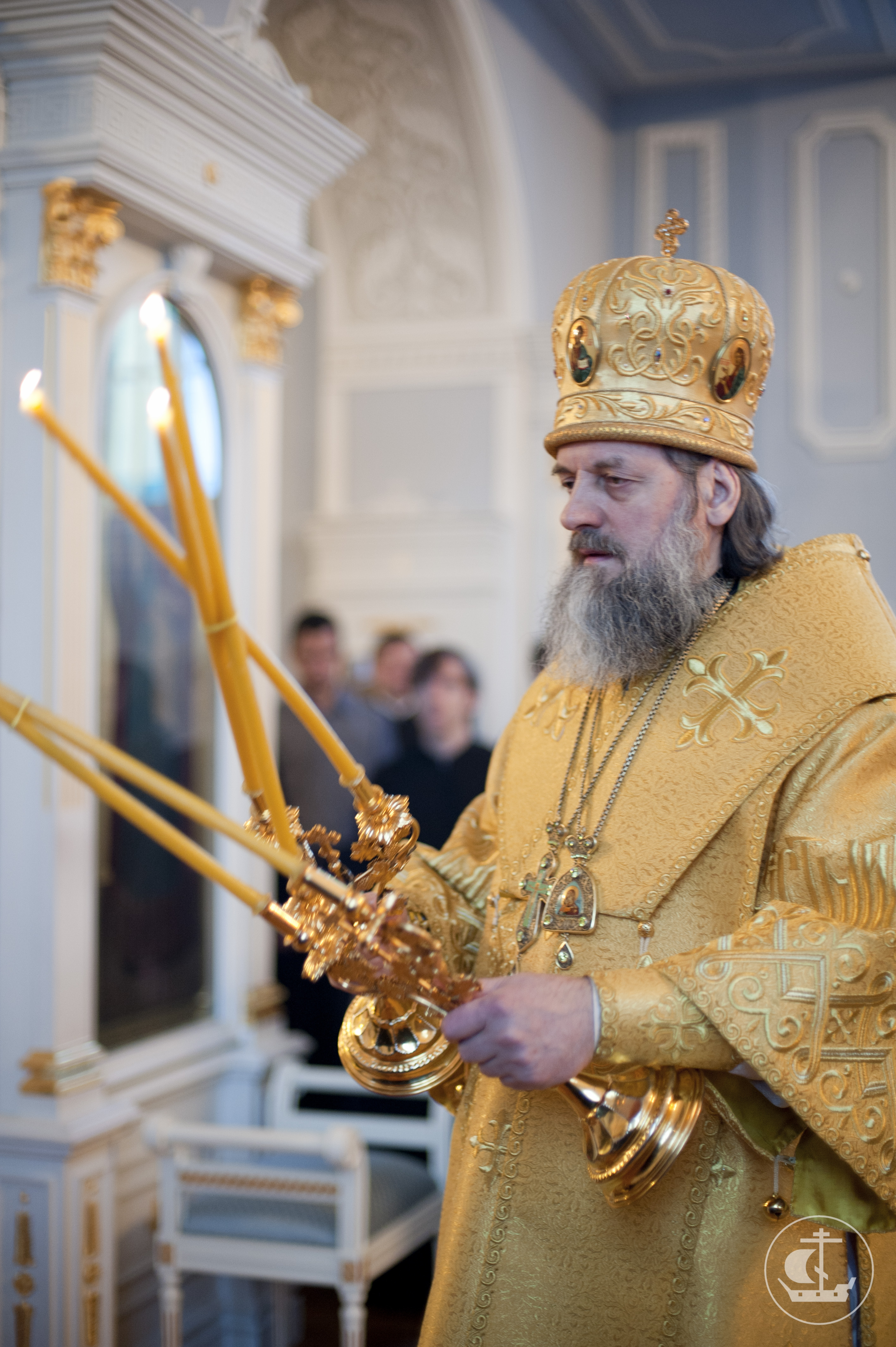
Russia-born Metropolitan Innokentiy (Vasilyev) of Vilnius condemned "Russia's war against Ukraine" and is determined to seek greater independence from Moscow.

The invasion of Ukraine, and the Russian Orthodox Church's seeming support for it has caused controversy among Orthodox churches elsewhere in the world. The invasion has been condemned by Bartholomew I of Constantinople, and by Patriarch Daniel of Romania, Patriarch Theodore II of Alexandria, and Archbishop Leo of Helsinki and All Finland.

Former Russian Orthodox priest Father Grigory Michnov-Vaytenko, head of the Russian Apostolic Church – a recognized religious organization founded by other dissident priests such as Father Gleb Yakunin – has been helping Ukrainian refugees in Russia, saying that "The [Russian Orthodox] church now works like the commissars did in the Soviet Union. And people of course see it. People don't like it. Especially after February [2022], a lot of people have left the church, both priests and people who were there for years."

On 13 March, the Parish of Saint Nicholas of Myra in Amsterdam, in the Netherlands, announced that it would be disaffiliating from the Russian Orthodox Church due to its support of the invasion, to instead affiliate with the Ecumenical Patriarchate of Constantinople.

On 17 March, Archbishop Innokentiy, head of the Russian Orthodox Diocese of Lithuania, announced that the Church would "strive for an even greater independence" from the Russian Orthodox Church, condemning the invasion. After the statement was released, the Synod of the Moscow Patriarchate created the Executive Board for the Near Abroad, which Bernardinai.lt speculated could be used to increase the power the Moscow Patriarchate has over the Diocese of Vilnius and Lithuania. In April, three priests of the Diocese of Vilnius and Lithuania were dismissed by Archbishop Innokentiy after criticising the invasion of Ukraine, and two were also suspended from active ministry.

In 2024, Yakov Vorontsov, a priest in Kazakhstan, was defrocked after criticising the Church's support of the invasion of Ukraine. He subsequently called for the establishment of an independent Orthodox church in Kazakhstan, following which he was detained by Kazakh authorities in 2026.

=== Ukrainian Orthodox Church ===
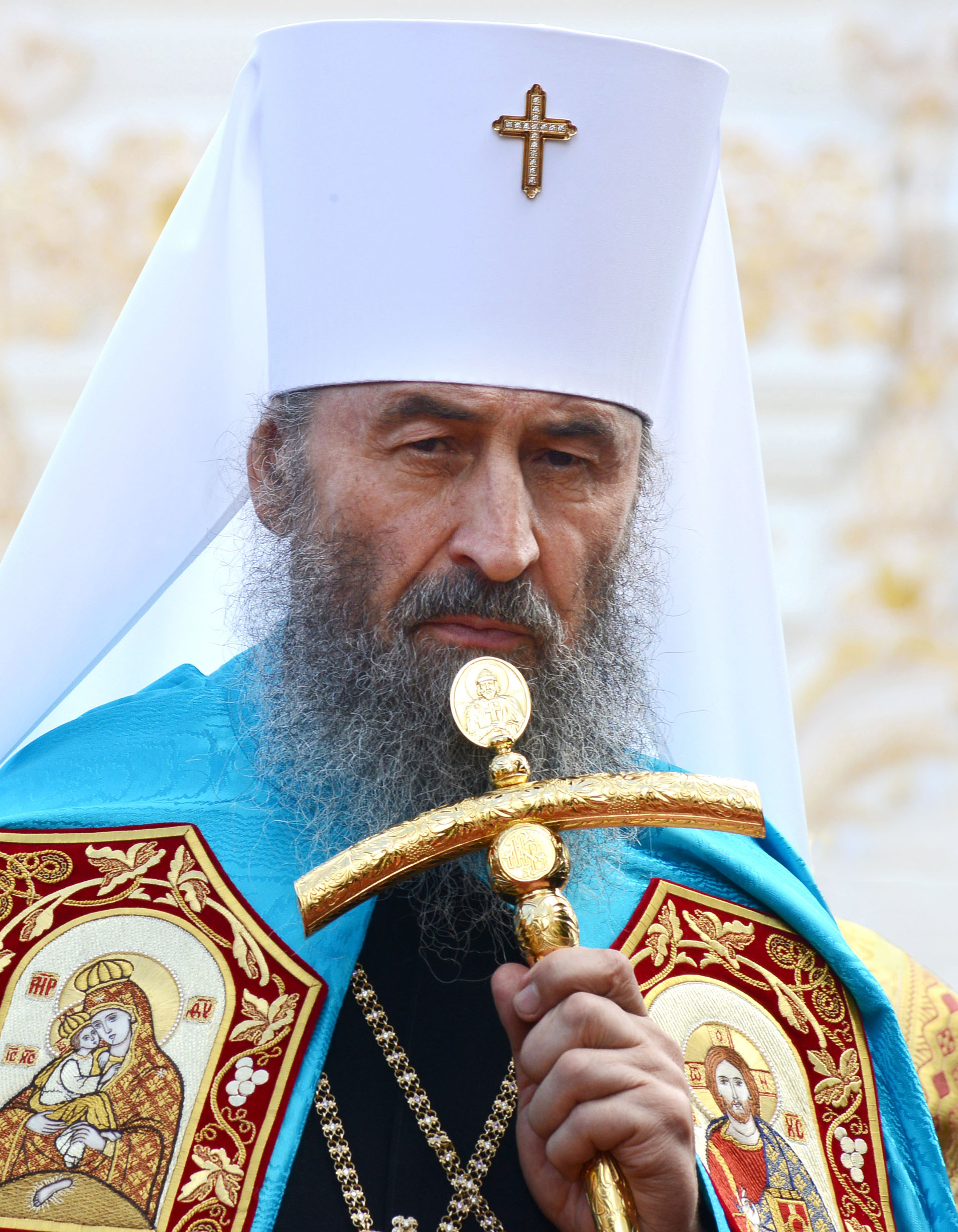
Metropolitan Onufriy Berezovsky, leader of the Ukrainian Orthodox Church (Moscow Patriarchate), has condemned the 2022 Russian invasion of Ukraine. Berezovsky's Ukrainian citizenship was revoked by President Volodymyr Zelenskyy after the Security Service of Ukraine discovered that Berezovsky had an undisclosed Russian citizenship.

There are two major orthodox churches in Ukraine: the Ukrainian Orthodox Church (UOC), which is subordinate to the Russian Orthodox Church, and the Orthodox Church of Ukraine (OCU), autocephalous and recognized by the Ecumenical Patriarch of Constantinople. The OCU was formed from a 2018 merger of the Ukrainian Autocephalous Orthodox Church (UAOC) and the Ukrainian Orthodox Church – Kyiv Patriarchate (UOC – KP), and was recognised by the Patriarch of Constantinople the following year.

Metropolitan Onufriy of Kyiv, primate of the UOC called the war "a disaster" stating, "The Ukrainian and Russian peoples came out of the Dnieper Baptismal font, and the war between these peoples is a repetition of the sin of Cain, who killed his own brother out of envy. Such a war has no justification either from God or from people." On 27 May 2022, following an official church council, it was announced that the Ukrainian Orthodox Church had declared its full independence and autonomy from the Moscow Patriarchate. According to The Irish Times, the UOC had removed all references to the Russian Orthodox Church from its founding documents the same month.

Even so, according to Ukrainska Pravda, the Security Service of Ukraine (SBU) has accused the UOC of being used by the Russian government to commit hybrid warfare in Ukraine, even before the start of the full-scale invasion. As of 11 September 2025, over 180 cases have been opened into crimes by UOC priests, including 23 bishops, and 38 priests have been convicted by Ukrainian courts. In 2023, SBU-head Vasyl Malyuk said, "I want to emphasise that the enemy values its agents in cassocks highly; for example, one such person was exchanged for 28 Ukrainian servicemen."

On 2 December 2022 Ukrainian President Volodymyr Zelenskyy entered a bill to the Verkhovna Rada, the national parliament of Ukraine, that would officially ban all activities of the UOC in Ukraine. On 20 August 2024, the Verkhovna Rada adopted the Law of Ukraine "On the Protection of the Constitutional Order in the Sphere of Activities of Religious Organizations", introducing the possibility of banning Ukrainian religious organizations affiliated with the Russian Orthodox Church nine months from the moment the State Service of Ukraine for Ethnopolicy and Freedom of Conscience issues the order, if this religious organization does not sever relations with the Russian Orthodox Church in accordance with Orthodox canon law. The UOC did not declare full autocephaly from the Russian Orthodox Church on 27 May 2022, and has never done so since.

A year later, the State Service for Ethnopolicy and Freedom of Conscience declared UOC to be affiliated with the Russian Orthodox Church, after the UOC published a letter on its website refusing to cut ties with it. In September, the State Service for Ethnopolicy and Freedom of Conscience filed a lawsuit against the UOC, seeking to closure of the Metropolis of Kyiv, the loss of its legal status, and the seizure of its non-religious assets by the state.

Metropolitan Onufriy's Ukrainian citizenship was terminated in July 2025, due to his failure to disclose his Russian citizenship, which he acquired in 2002, and his close relationship with the Moscow Patriarchate. RBC-Ukraine has independently verified a leaked image of a valid Russian passport belonging to Onufriy, despite the UOC's claims that he is not a Russian citizen. Zelenskyy commented, "Figures with political influence and Russian passports, individuals working against Ukrainian independence in all its dimensions, including spiritual independence, and anyone who supports or justifies aggression – none of these people have or will have a place in Ukraine. We are making the appropriate decisions".

In October 2025, the Office of the United Nations High Commissioner for Human Rights (OHCHR) said that its experts have expressed "serious concern" that the UOC was being subject to religious persecution by the Ukrainian government, especially regarding the decision to revoke Metropolitan Onufriy's citizenship. Human Rights Watch criticised the ban on the UOC, calling it a violation of the right to freedom of religion.

== Other Christianity ==
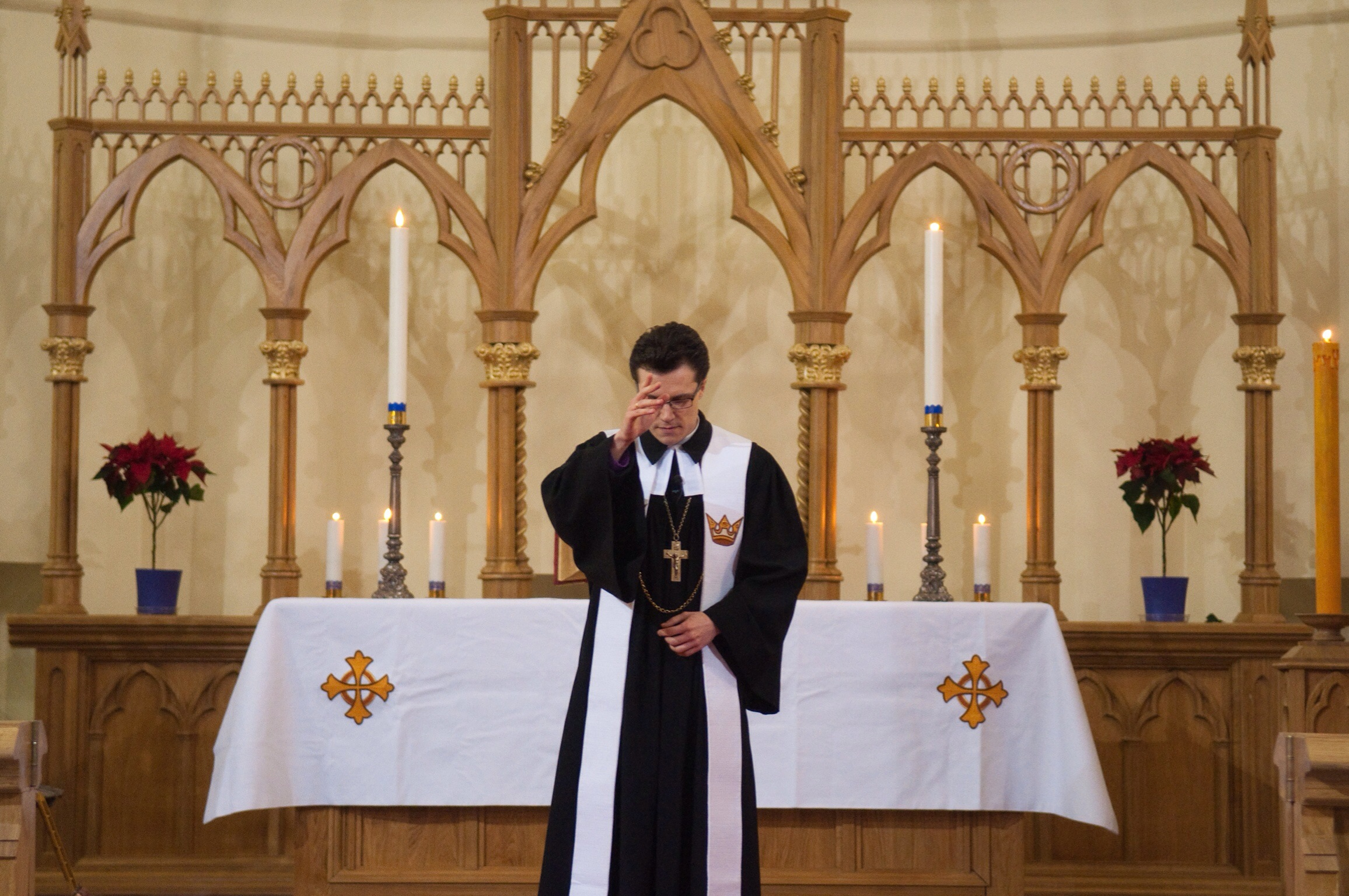
Archbishop Dietrich Brauer giving the blessing at a service in Moscow Lutheran cathedral. He left Russia in March 2022.

Pope Francis, head of the Catholic Church, has condemned the invasion. On 16 March, Pope Francis and Patriarch Kirill held a video meeting to discuss the invasion for the first time. Afterwards, they released a joint statement saying they "stressed the exceptional importance of the ongoing negotiation process, expressing their hope for the soonest achievement of a just peace." On 30 April 2023, Pope Francis announced that the Vatican is taking part in a secret "peace mission" to try to end the war between Russia and Ukraine. In May, he warned Patriarch Kirill against being "Putin's altar boy" and criticised his support for the invasion.

Claire Giangravé of Religious News Service has argued that the invasion has "set back the clock on overcoming the Christian divide between East and West."

Archbishop Dietrich Brauer, head of the Evangelical-Lutheran Church of Russia, left Russia in March 2022. He had previously condemned the invasion. According to the documentary A Faith Under Siege, the Russian armed forces have destroyed at least 680 churches and suppressed Protestants movements.

On 24 February 2022, the day the invasion began, the Kyiv Temple of The Church of Jesus Christ of Latter-day Saints was shut down. The next day, The Church of Jesus Christ of Latter-day Saints said that it would "pray that this armed conflict will end quickly" and "that the controversies will end peacefully," but did not directly refer to either Ukraine or Russia in the statement. Peggy Fletcher Stack and David Noyce of The Salt Lake Tribune attributed the church's reluctance to explicitly condemn the invasion to an attempt at protecting their members in Russia and Ukraine.

== Judaism ==
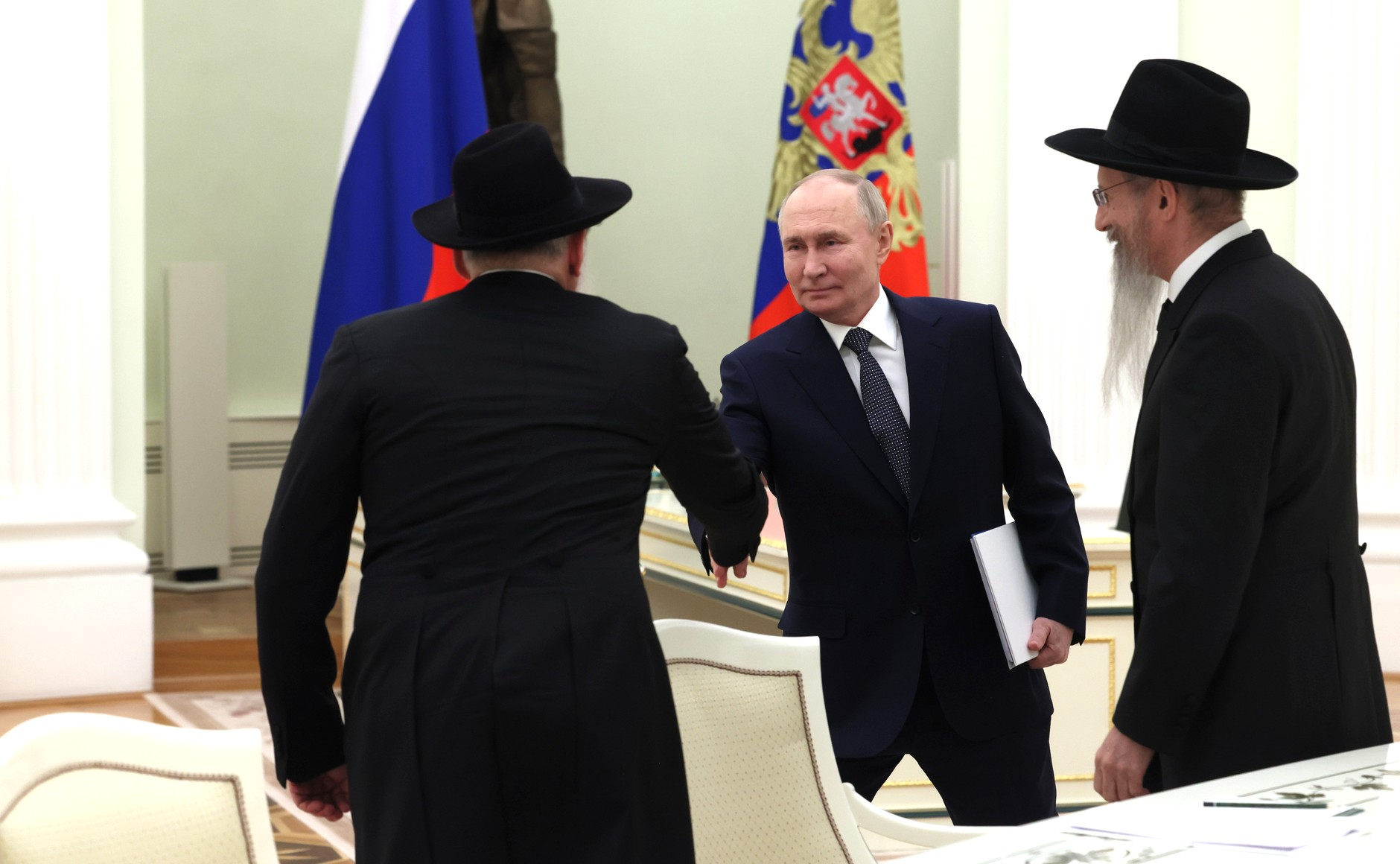
Putin with Russia's Chief Rabbi, Berel Lazar, and Federation of Jewish Communities of Russia president, Aleksandr Boroda, February 2025

=== Russia ===
Haaretz has reported that the Russian government has pressured Russian Jewish institutions to speak in favour of the invasion, including with threats of retaliation if those institutions did not. Some Jewish Russian opposition figures have been targeted with antisemitic threats due to their opposition to the war, including Alexei Venediktov.

The Chief Rabbi of Russia, Rabbi Berel Lazar, spoke out against the Russian invasion of Ukraine, called Russia to withdraw and for an end to the war, and offered to mediate. The Chief Rabbi of Moscow, Pinchas Goldschmidt, left Russia after he refused a request from state officials to publicly support the Russian invasion of Ukraine. Goldschmidt said that "Pressure was put on community leaders to support the war and I refused to do so. I resigned because to continue as chief rabbi of Moscow would be a problem for the community because of the repressive measures taken against dissidents." He urged Russian Jews to leave due to a claimed rise in antisemitism, supported by Putin's government to redirect discontent away from themselves. On 30 June 2023, Goldschmidt was designated in Russia as a foreign agent.

In October 2022, assistant to the Secretary of Russian Security Council Aleksey Pavlov called for the "desatanization" of Ukraine, claiming that the country was home to hundreds of neo-pagan cults, including the Orthodox Jewish Chabad-Lubavitch movement. Russian Security Council Secretary Nikolai Patrushev apologized for Pavlov's words.

Kremlin propagandist Vladimir Solovyov accused Western-backed Ukrainian "Banderites" of attempting to assassinate him because he is a "Jewish anti-fascist." Solovyov claimed that the Ukrainian government had plans to exterminate all the Jews in Ukraine, and questioned whether Michael Brodsky, Israeli ambassador to Ukraine, would attempt to "justify Nazi Germany saying, 'Well, on the other hand, if it were not for Hitler, there would be no State of Israel.'" Solovyov has also publicly listed the names of Jews that he claimed were not patriotic enough.

=== Ukraine ===
Ukrainian President Volodymyr Zelenskyy is Jewish.

The Chief Rabbi of Kyiv, Rabbi Jonathan Markovitch has pledged to care for those who are unable to flee as Russian forces continue their assault on Ukraine’s capital. He went to dozens of countries (Washington DC, Israel, England, etc.) to help Ukraine with humanitarian aid.

== Islam ==
=== Russia ===
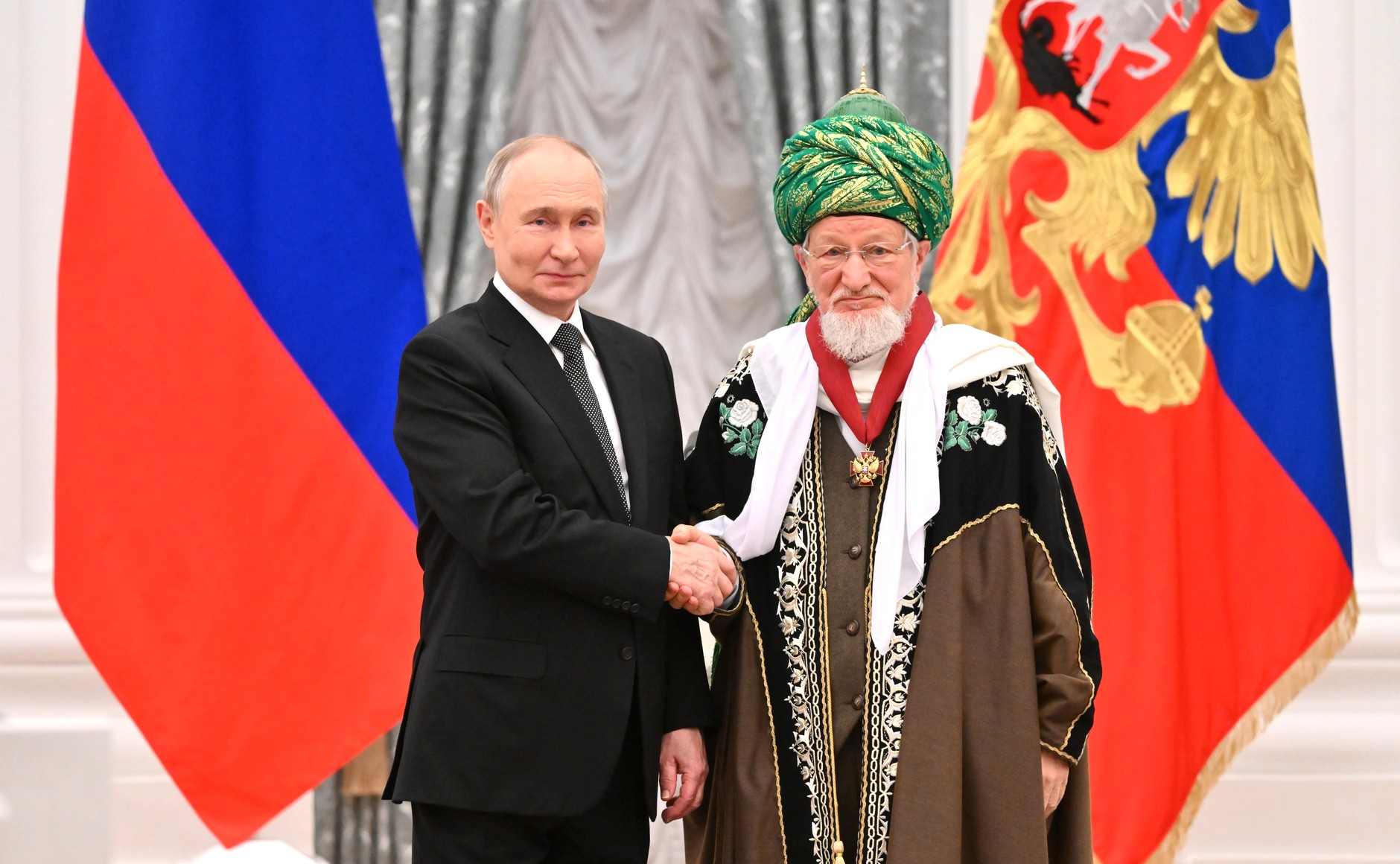
Russia's Grand Mufti, Talgat Tadzhuddin, with Vladimir Putin, December 2024

Islam is a prominent minority faith in Russia, and some Muslims in the country have given theological justifications for supporting the invasion of Ukraine. Magomed Khitanev, a Muslim military commander, described the Russian invasion as a "holy jihad" and said "We're on the side of God! We are defending divine laws. We are defending our faith. We're asking: Oh Ukrainians, why did you permit gay parades in Kyiv, Kharkiv and Odesa?" Khitanev also falsely accused Pope Francis, who opposed the invasion, of officially endorsing gay marriage and gender transition and claimed that the "Roman Pope officially opened the temple of Satan." The event featuring Khitanev and Vladimir Solovyov was widely broadcast on Russian state TV.

The Grand Mufti of Russia, Talgat Tadzhuddin, and other Russian Muslim leaders supported the invasion of Ukraine. Tadzhuddin supported the Kremlin's claim that they were participating in the "denazification" of Ukraine, and said that the Russian government should continue the war "so as to leave no fascists or parasites anywhere near us, because in future there may not be enough pesticide".

Ramzan Kadyrov, leader of Chechnya, claimed that the invasion was a "war against Satanism" and urged Caucasians to sign up for the military, because "this concerns us more than anyone". Kadyrov claimed Russia was waging "a great jihad" against Ukraine.

Two Muslim Tajik nationals that had enlisted in the Russian army began the Soloti military training ground shooting against their commanders and other soldiers after an argument with other soldiers about whether the war in Ukraine was "holy" (the Tajiks' position being that the only just war would be one waged by Muslims against infidels). They began the shooting after a lieutenant colonel allegedly described Allah as a "weakling" and "coward".

=== Ukraine ===
As of 2022, most Muslims in Ukraine are Crimean Tatars, a Sunni Muslim ethnic group hailing from the Crimean peninsula. In 1944, all 180,000 Crimean Tatars living in Crimea were forcefully deported to Uzbekistan on the orders of Joseph Stalin, and about 90,000 of them died within their first two years of exile. Their descendants were only allowed to return to their homeland in the 1980s. After the 2014 Russian annexation of Crimea, the Crimean Tatar legislative assembly, the Mejlis of the Crimean Tatar People, was banned, and public commemoration of the Stalinist deportations was forbidden.

The Crimean Tatar World Congress issued a statement saying "Our Congress recognizes its humanitarian and moral obligation to stand in solidarity with the Ukrainians … so help them in all ways they are capable." The Crimean Tatar-led Atesh (Crimean Tatar: Ateş, lit. 'Fire') guerrilla movement has carried out sabotage operations within the Russian Armed Forces and in Russian-held territories such as Crimea and parts of Donetsk Oblast.

In 2025, the Main Directorate of Intelligence opened the first military mosque in Ukraine, As-Salam, in an undisclosed location.

The Chechen Republic of Ichkeria has sent formations to fight on the side of Ukraine, such as the Sheikh Mansur Battalion and the Dzhokhar Dudayev Battalion. In 2022, the Verkhovna Rada passed a resolution recognising Chechnya as "temporarily Russian-occupied", and condemned the Chechen genocide committed by Russia.

== Other religions ==
=== Buddhism ===
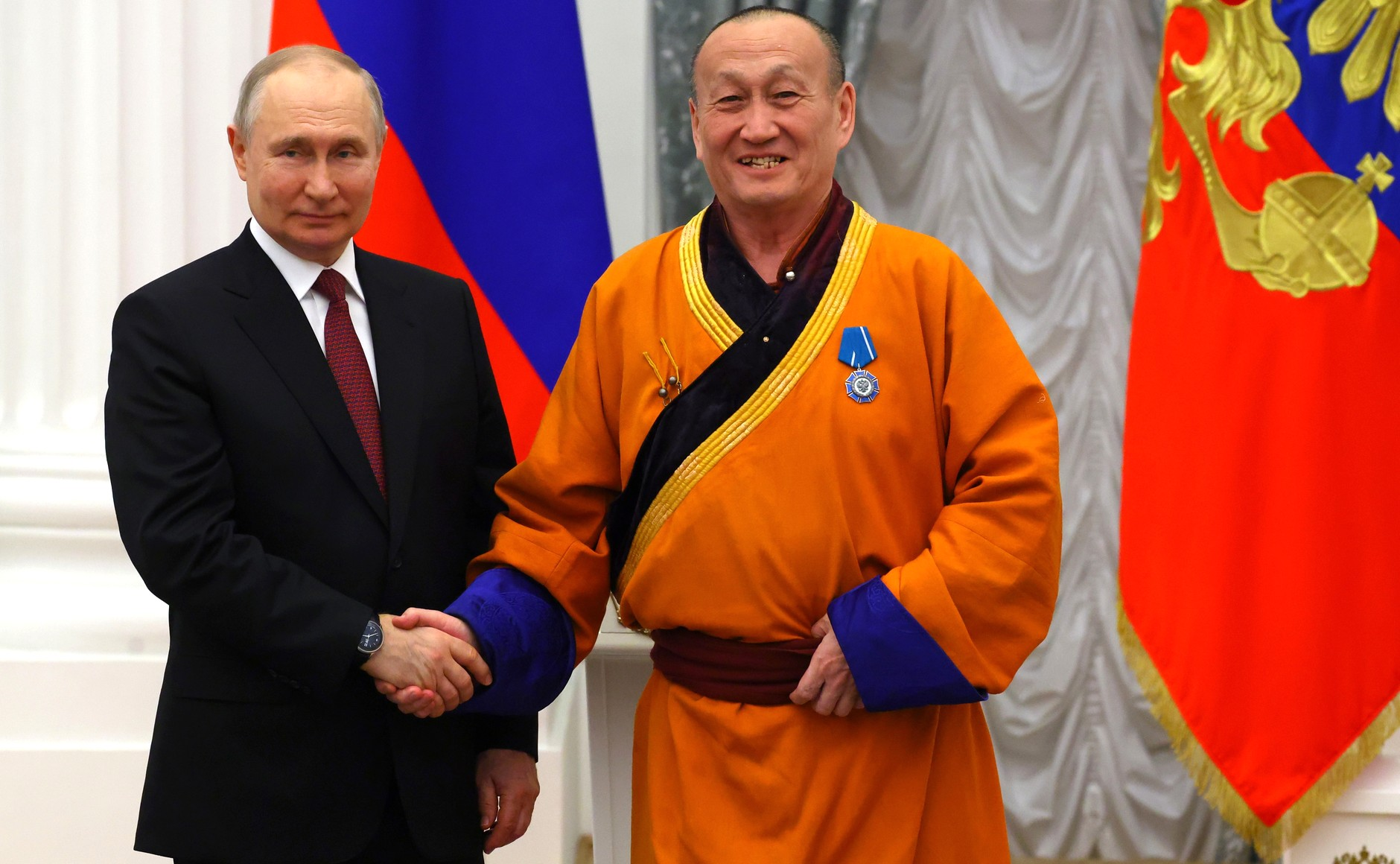
Khambo Lama Damba Ayusheev with Putin, May 2023

The 14th Dalai Lama expressed "anguish" over the bloodshed in Ukraine, saying that "war is outdated" and calling for a quick return to peace.

Khambo Lama Damba Ayusheev, the head of the Buddhist Traditional Sangha of Russia (BTSR), the largest Buddhist denomination in Russia, voiced support for the Russian invasion of Ukraine. He said that Russian Buddhists are "fighting for the Russian and the Slavic world" in Ukraine to "sav[e] their Mongolic world". Several Buddhist monks have been killed fighting after enlisting in the Russian army: Bair Darmaev of the 5th Guards Tank Brigade, who died during fighting in the Donetsk Oblast of Ukraine, and Khyshikto Tsybikov, who died of a shrapnel wound after being mobilised during the 2022 Russian mobilization.

On 1 October 2022, Erdne Ombadykow, the Supreme Lama of Russia's Republic of Kalmykia, fled Russia to Mongolia and condemned the Russian invasion of Ukraine. He was recognized in Russia as a foreign agent in January 2023, and resigned from his position as the Supreme Lama of Kalmykia in response.

In April 2026, the Russian government deported a group of Buddhist monks from India, after a raid upon a Buddhist festival in Moscow by police. They were accused of performing "unauthorized missionary work". Per the Tibetan Review, "The group of Tibetan monks from India was only to lead group worship and create mandalas, with nothing remotely resembling a missionary work being on planned." According to Echo of Moscow, the most likely cause of the raid and deportations was that a book by Ombadykow was being sold at the event.

=== Hinduism ===
As of 2023, there are about 15,000 followers of the International Society for Krishna Consciousness (ISKCON) in Ukraine, and about 30 temples. ISKCON's temple in Kramatorsk was completely destroyed by Russian forces, and its temple in Kherson was severely damaged.

Many ISKCON devotees from Mariupol have relocated to Northern Ireland after the destruction of about 90 per cent of the city following the 2022 siege.

=== Slavic neopaganism ===
Rodnovery, or Slavic Native Faith, has a substantial number of followers in Russia and in other Slavic countries. The Wagner Group, a private military company which played a major role in the invasion, had close ties to Slavic and Nordic neopaganism, and it included an ideological branch whose purpose was to promote Rodnover ideas. Wagner founder Yevgeny Prigozhin drew an explicit connection between pagan symbols such as Mjölnir (Thor's hammer) and Wagner fighters' use of sledgehammers as a weapon. Senior figures in the Russian Orthodox Church were outspokenly critical of Wagner due to its neopagan ties.

== See also ==
- Religion in Ukraine
- Religion in Russia
- Consecration of Russia
