= Eastern Orthodoxy in Kazakhstan =

Church of Kazakhstan
- Primate: Alexander of Astana
- Bishops: 11
- Parishes: 295
- Language: Slavonic and Kazakh
- Headquarters: Astana, Kazakhstan
- Territory: Kazakhstan
- Members: 3,268,143 (2021 census)
- Official website: www.mitropolia.kz

The Eastern Orthodox Church in Kazakhstan is a metropolitan district or metropolia of the Russian Orthodox Church. Although not autonomous or fully self-governing like the former Ukrainian Orthodox Church of the Moscow Patriarchate, the Church in Kazakhstan has been given some self-government, with jurisdiction over all Orthodox Christians in Kazakhstan. Most of its members are ethnic Russians, Ukrainians, Koreans, and Belarusians resident in Kazakhstan.

== Demographics ==
The 2021 census noted that Kazakhstan is 17.19% Christian. Other figures suggest that 24% of the population is Orthodox. The Christian population is mostly of Russian origin and is concentrated in the north and north-east of the country.

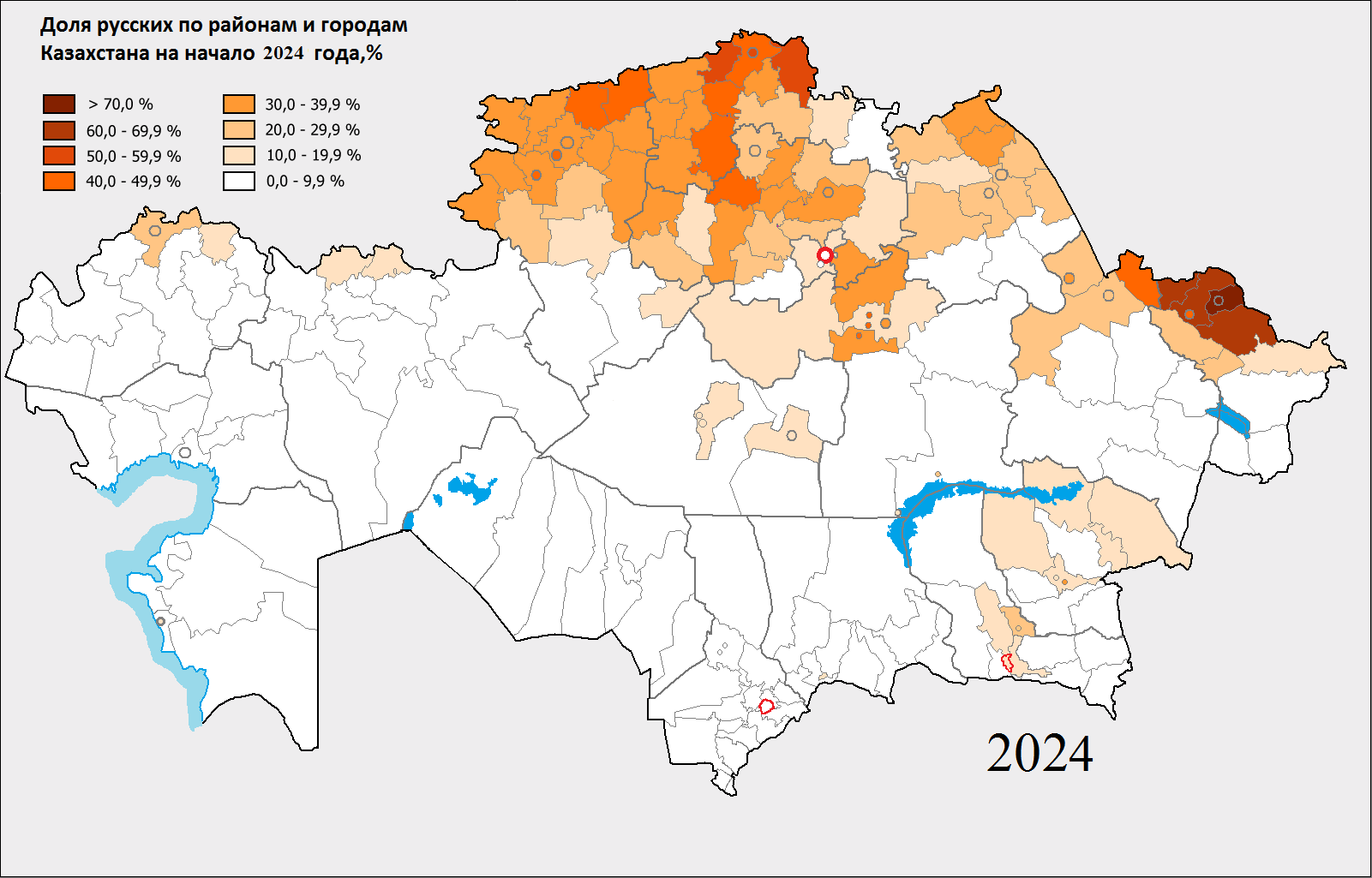
The share of Russians by districts and cities in Kazakhstan, 2021

In 2022, the government considered the Russian Orthodox Church as one of the country's traditional religions. Kazakhstan celebrates Orthodox Christmas as a national holiday.

== History ==
As in the rest of Central Asia, in ancient times, there were communities of the Church of the East in what today is Kazakhstan. These communities were long extinct by the time the modern history of Orthodoxy started in Kazakhstan with the expansion of the Russian Empire into the region.

In 1871, the Russian Orthodox Most Holy Synod founded the Eparchy of Turkestan to care for all Orthodox Christians in Russian Central Asia, but this was later divided into smaller dioceses.

In June 1945, the Russian Orthodox Church created the Eparchy of Almaty and Kazakhstan to care for Orthodox Christians in Kazakhstan. The decades following this saw the Soviet Union's political control of all religious groups.

Following the collapse of the Soviet Union in 1991, the Russian Orthodox Church in Kazakhstan was reorganized into three eparchies, of Almaty and Semey, Shymkent and Akmola, and Oral and Guryevskiy. In 2003, these three eparchies were united as an ecclesiastical province, with the seat of the Almaty Eparchy being transferred to Astana (formerly Akmola) following its designation as the capital of Kazakhstan. In October 2010, three more eparchies, of Karaganda, Kostanay, and Pavlodar, were created in Kazakhstan and the Archbishop of Astana and Almaty was elevated to the rank of metropolitan archbishop with the title "Metropolitan of Astana and Kazakhstan".

In 2011, three more eparchies, of Kokshetau, Petropavl, and Oskemen, were founded. Although not autonomous or self-governing, the Orthodox Church in Kazakhstan has its own statute approved by the Russian Orthodox Holy Synod and is responsible for coordinating the educational programs, publishing work, social outreach, and missionary efforts of Orthodoxy in Kazakhstan.

In 2024, Yakov Vorontsov, an Orthodox priest in Almaty, was defrocked following his public criticisms of the Church's support of the Russian invasion of Ukraine.

== Structure ==
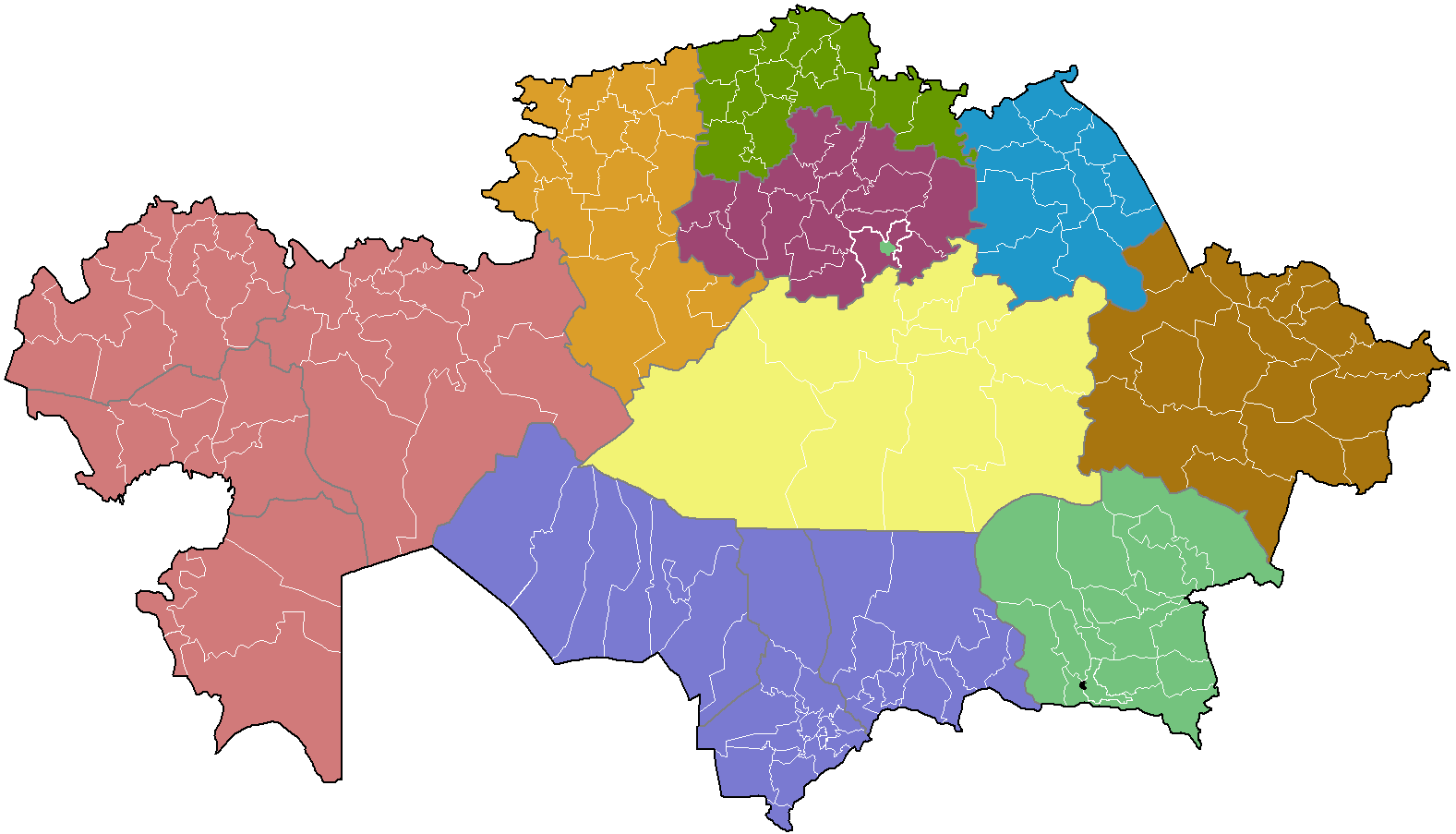
Eparchies of the Orthodox Church in Kazakhstan: Astana and Almaty (bright green); Karaganda and Shakhtinsk (yellow); Kokshetau and Akmola (bright purple); Kostanay and Rudny (orange); Oral and Aktobe (red); Pavlodar and Ekibastuz (blue); Petropavlovsk and Bulaevo (green); Shymkent and Taraz (purple); Oskemen and Semey (brown)

The Orthodox Church in Kazakhstan is currently cared for by 9 eparchies or dioceses. They are:

- Eparchy of Astana and Almaty: City of Astana and Almaty and Jetisu Regions
- Eparchy of Karaganda and Shakhtinsk: Karaganda and Ulytau Regions
- Eparchy of Kokshetau and Akmola: Akmola Region
- Eparchy of Kostanay and Rudny: Kostanay Region
- Eparchy of Oral and Aktobe: Aktobe, Atyrau, Mangystau, and West Kazakhstan Regions
- Eparchy of Pavlodar and Ekibastuz: Pavlodar Region
- Eparchy of Petropavlovsk and Bulaevo: North Kazakhstan Region
- Eparchy of Shymkent and Taraz: Cities of Baikonur and Shymkent; Jambyl, Kyzylorda, and South Kazakhstan Regions
- Eparchy of Oskemen and Semey: Abai and East Kazakhstan Regions

With the exception of the Eparchy of Astana and Almaty, the eparchies are all contiguous territorially. The Eparchy of Astana and Almaty, however, covers two separate areas centered on the former and current capital cities of Kazakhstan.

== Hierarchy ==
The Local Synod of the Orthodox Church in Kazakhstan consists of the nine diocesan bishops serving in the country as well as their vicar or auxiliary bishops. The Local Synod has competency over matters concerning Orthodoxy in Kazakhstan, but must have many of its decisions, such as the establishment of new dioceses, approved by the Holy Synod of the Russian Orthodox Church. As of January 2016 the members of the Local Synod are:

- Metropolitan Alexander Mogilyov of Astana and Kazakhstan (2010–present)
- Archbishop Anthony Moskalenko of Oral and Aktobe (1991–present)
- Archbishop Chrysanthus Konoplev of Shymkent and Taraz (2021–present)
- Bishop Anatolius Aksenov of Kostanay and Rudny (2010–present)
- Bishop Barnabas Safonov of Pavlodar and Ekibastuz (2010–present)
- Bishop Sebastian Osokin of Karaganda and Shakhtinsk (2011–present)
- Bishop Vladimir Mikheykin of Petropavl and Bulaevo (2014–present)
- Bishop Amphilochius Bondarenko of Oskemen and Semey (2012–present)
- Bishop Barsanuphius Vinichenko of Kokshetau and Akmola (2025–present)
- Bishop Nectarius Frolov of Taldykorgan, Auxiliary of the Astana and Almaty Eparchy (2014–present)
- Bishop Gennadius Gogolev of Kaskelen, Auxiliary of the Astana and Almaty Eparchy (2010–present)

== See also ==
- Religion in Kazakhstan
- Christianity in Kazakhstan
- Russian Orthodox Church

== Sources and external links ==
- Official Website of Orthodox Church in Kazakhstan
- Metropolitan District of the Russian Orthodox Church in the Republic of Kazakhstan (Website of the Moscow Patriarchate)
