= Umiński =

Umiński is a Polish masculine surname, its feminine counterart is Umińska. Notable people with the surname include:

- Alexey Uminsky (born 1960), Eastern Orthodox priest from Russia
- Eugenia Umińska (1910–1980), Polish violinist
- Jadwiga Umińska (1900–1983), Polish painter
- Jan Nepomucen Umiński (1778–1851), Polish military officer
- Stanisława Umińska (1901–1977), Polish theatre actress
- Władysław Umiński (1865–1954), Polish journalist
