= Chrysanthus Konoplev =

Russian Orthodox bishop (born 1962)

Chrysanthus Konoplyov
- Bishop of Chimkent and Turkestan; Епископ Чимкентский и Туркестанский
- Native name: Хрисанф Коноплёв
- Church: Russian Orthodox Church
- Elected: 13 October 2022
- Predecessor: Eleutherius Kozorez

Personal details
- Born: Sergey Mikhailovich Konoplyov; 16 April 1962 (age 64) Alma-Ata, Alma-Ata Oblast, Kazakh SSR, Soviet Union
- Education: Musical College of Almaty; Almaty Theological Academy; Moscow Theological Academy

Bishop Chrysanthus (Russian: епископ Хрисанф; secular name Sergey Mikhailovich Konoplyov, (Note: In this name that follows East Slavic naming customs, the patronymic is Mikhailovich and the family name is Konoplyov.) Russian: Сергей Михайлович Коноплёв; born 16 April 1962) is a bishop of the Russian Orthodox Church (ROC), who has served as the bishop of Chimkent and Turkestan since October 2022.

As bishop of Chimkent and Turkestan, he's also a permanent member of the Holy Synod of the Russian Orthodox Church.

== Early life and education ==
Chrysanthus was born Sergey Konoplyov on 16 April 1962 in Alma-Ata to a family of workers. In 1979, he finished the 63rd middle school of Alma-Ata.

From 1979 to 1984, he studied at the Tchaikovsky Alma-Ata Musical School and worked with the Alma-Ata United Musical Ensemble from 1984 to 1996. He was baptised at the St. Nicholas Cathedral in 1989. He worked as a guard and reader at the Cathedral from 1993 to 1996.

Chrysanthus attended the Almaty Bishopric Theological Academy from 1995 to 1997. On 22 May 1996, Archbishop Alexy ordained him a deacon at the St. Nicholas Cathedral. He was later ordained an ierey at the Ascension Cathedral, Almaty on 4 January 1998.

From 2001 to 2011, he studied at the Moscow Theological Academy.

== Episcopal ministry ==
From 3 June 1996 to 20 January 1998, Chrysanthus served as cleric at the St. Nicholas Cathedral, Almaty. After this, he was appointed the priest-in-charge of the Saint Adrian and Nathalie Temple of Otegen Batyr, Almaty Region.

After his studies in Moscow, on 25 March 2003, he was reappointed to Otegen Batyr, as the dean of the 3rd Church of the Alma-Ata Okrug. In 2009, he led the construction of a church on the grounds of Correctional Institution LA 155/8 in the settlement of Zarechnoye, Almaty Region. The construction was completed in 2010. In 2012, the church was dismantled by order of the institution's administration due to new legislation. On 26 October 2011, he was appointed responsible for the spiritual care of inmates in correctional institutions in Almaty and the Almaty Region.

On 1 August 2012, he was appointed lecturer at the Alma-Ata Theological Seminary, teaching the course "Practical Guide for Pastors". In 2016, he became head of the Department of Church-Practical Disciplines, and on 1 August 2017, he was appointed lecturer in "Homiletics".

On 12 December 2015, he was appointed a member of the Diocesan Council of the Astana Diocese. Since 23 August 2017, he has additionally served as Chairman of the Synodal Commission for Prison Ministry of the Kazakhstan Metropolitan District.

On 1 April 2021, he was tonsured a monk by Metropolitan Alexander, receiving the name Chrysanth in honor of Martyr Chrysanthus of Rome. By decree of Metropolitan Alexander dated 1 November 2021, he was appointed Deputy Head of the Kazakhstan Metropolitan District in the Chimkent Diocese.

By decision of the Holy Synod of 13 October 2022, he was elected Bishop of Chimkent and Turkestan after the death of his predecessor Eleutherius Kozorez. On 22 October 2022, during the Divine Liturgy at the Ascension Cathedral, Almaty, Metropolitan Alexander elevated him to the rank of archimandrite.

He was designated a bishop on 5 November 2022, in the Throne Hall of the Cathedral of Christ the Saviour in Moscow. He was consecrated on December 2 during the Divine Liturgy at the Cathedral.
