= Yakov Vorontsov =

Kazakh priest (born 1988)

Yakov
- Native name: Иаков
- Church: Russian Orthodox Church (until 2024)
- Metropolis: Kazakhstan

Orders
- Ordination: by Naum

Personal details
- Born: Vladimir Yuryevich Vorontsov; 20 February 1986 (age 40) Almaty, Kazakh SSR, Soviet Union

Yakov Vorontsov (Kazakh: Иаков Воронцов; born 20 February 1986), born Vladimir Yuryevich Vorontsov (Kazakh: Владимир Юрьевич Воронцов), is a Kazakh priest who was formerly a member of the Russian Orthodox Church in Kazakhstan. He was suspended and subsequently defrocked following his criticisms of the church's support of the Russian invasion of Ukraine in 2022.

== Early life and ordination ==
Vorontsov was born and raised in Almaty, in what was then the Kazakh Soviet Socialist Republic within the Soviet Union. As a child, he attended Sunday school at St. Nicholas Cathedral, a Russian Orthodox church. Vorontsov's disillusionment with the work of local priests in Almaty initially led to him deciding not to train as a priest at a seminary; however, he later changed his mind, and upon joining the priesthood, took the name Yakov (lit. 'Jacob'). Following Vorontsov's ordination, he served for seven years as a priest in Merki, Jambyl Region, and wrote several books about the history of the Orthodox church in Kazakhstan.

== Activism ==
=== As a Russian Orthodox priest (2022–2024) ===
In February 2022, following the Russian invasion of Ukraine as part of the ongoing Russo-Ukrainian war, Vorontsov was among 300 Orthodox clergy who signed an open letter calling for peace in Ukraine. In addition, he called for Kazakhstan to withdraw from Russian-led regional organisations such as the Collective Security Treaty Organization and the Eurasian Economic Union. As a result of this, in March 2022 the Russian Orthodox Church in Kazakhstan suspended Vorontsov from conducting religious services, stating his "political demands" violated both Kazakhstan's laws on religious organisations, as well as his oath of priesthood.

By April 2023, Vorontsov had become more well known in Kazakhstan after he began publicly reading the gospel in the Kazakh language in Aktobe. A native Russian speaker, Vorontsov began learning Kazakh following the Russian invasion, describing it as "the future of Kazakhstan". By June, he had been banned from the priesthood of the Moscow Patriarchate within the Russian Orthodox Church; the decision was variously attributed to his criticisms of the Russian government, as well as his increasingly independent religious activity.

In August 2023, Vorontsov published posts on social media criticising the Russian Orthodox Church's support of the Russian government and the Russo-Ukrainian war. In December, he proposed the establishment of a Kazakh Orthodox church independent from the Russian Orthodox Church. While the Ministry of Culture and Information's Committee for Religious Affairs ruled that there was nothing legally preventing Vorontsov from establishing his own church, on 27 December he was arrested and charged with "inciting discord".

=== Defrocking and subsequent activism (2024–present) ===
On 15 July 2024, Vorontsov was officially defrocked by the Russian Orthodox Church. Following this, he began worshipping at a Ukrainian Catholic church in Almaty.

On 10 December 2024, a new criminal case was opened against Vorontsov on charges of "inciting social, national, tribal, racial, ethnic or religious discord". He wrote an open letter to the President of Kazakhstan, Kassym-Jomart Tokayev, requesting support. In April 2025, the charges against Vorontsov were dropped due to "insufficient evidence of the crime".

In July 2025, Vorontsov called for the establishment of a representative office of the Ecumenical Patriarchate of Constantinople, part of the Eastern Orthodox Church, in Kazakhstan. The following month, he stated his intention to send a letter to the Patriarch of Constantinople about establishing within Kazakhstan an independent diocese separate from the Patriarch of Moscow and all Rus', which was signed by himself as well as several residents of Almaty.

On 13 February 2026, Vorontsov was detained by police officers in Almaty on drug-related charges; it was later reported that a "powdered substance" was found at his home. On 23 February, he was interrogated by officers on charges of drug possession and maintaining a premises for drug use; Vorontsov's ongoing pre-trial detention was authorised by a judge on 25 February. Vorontsov's lawyer stated that the charges against him were false and that the drugs had been planted in his home by Kazakh authorities. While in detention, Vorontsov published a letter in which he stated that the charges against him were due to his efforts to establish an independent Orthodox church in Kazakhstan; it was reported that the arrest had occurred days after he sued the Ministry of Justice for refusing to allow him to register an independent community of Orthodox Christians he had co-founded in late 2025.

On 25 May 2026, Vorontsov was forcibly transferred to a psychiatric facility outside of Almaty. A court hearing, which did not include Vorontsov or his lawyer, deemed the decision a "security measure", with him being transferred before his appeal could be heard. The human rights organisation Human Rights Watch described both Vorontsov's charges and the decision to detain him at a medical facility "dubious", noting that he had "no history" of substance use or mental illness. In August 2026, Vorontsov's lawyer expressed concern that his health had declined during his detention, and that prison authorities had restricted his access to prescribed medications until earlier that month.

Vorontsov's trial is scheduled to begin on 11 September 2026.
