= Merki =

Coordinates: 42°52′22″N 73°10′43″E

Merki Kazakh: Мerkı
- Coat of arms
- Interactive map of Merki

Merki (Kazakh: Меркі, Merkı) is an administrative center in the Merki region located in the Jambyl Region in the south of Kazakhstan. It is located near to the mountains that serve as a border between Kazakhstan and Kyrgyzstan. It has an estimated population of roughly 35,900. The postal code of Merki is 080500. The phone code is +7 72632. The nearest airport to Merki is located in Taraz.

Merki is located at the Kyrgyz Ala-Too mountain range that serves as a border with the Kyrgyz Republic. The international highway M39 crosses Merki and connects three big cities in Central Asia: Almaty, Bishkek and Tashkent. Historically, Merki was located close to the Great Silk Road. Merki's coat of arms symbolises an ancient city, a mosque, the Great Silk Road in the form of a caravan with camels and mountains at the top.

In 2024, Merki's akim (city mayor in Kazakh) is Zhorabek Baubekov.

== People ==
The total number of the population of Merki region is estimated to be 100,000 people. The population of Merki consists of various ethnicities with Kazakhs constituting the main ethnic group. Among other groups are Iranian Azeris that were forced to migrate there by Bolsheviks (in 1938).

Yakov Vorontsov previously served as the area's Russian Orthodox priest.

== Climate ==
Merki has a dry-summer humid continental climate (Köppen: Dsa), with hot, dry summers and cold winters. The southern part of Kazakhstan including Merki is highly vulnerable to climate change.

Climate data for Merki (1991–2020)
| Month | Jan | Feb | Mar | Apr | May | Jun | Jul | Aug | Sep | Oct | Nov | Dec | Year |
|---|---|---|---|---|---|---|---|---|---|---|---|---|---|
| Mean daily maximum °C (°F) | 1.7 (35.1) | 4.2 (39.6) | 12.0 (53.6) | 19.2 (66.6) | 24.6 (76.3) | 30.4 (86.7) | 33.1 (91.6) | 32.1 (89.8) | 26.5 (79.7) | 18.8 (65.8) | 9.8 (49.6) | 3.2 (37.8) | 18.0 (64.4) |
| Daily mean °C (°F) | −4.1 (24.6) | −1.8 (28.8) | 5.2 (41.4) | 12.1 (53.8) | 17.4 (63.3) | 22.7 (72.9) | 25.3 (77.5) | 23.7 (74.7) | 17.9 (64.2) | 10.5 (50.9) | 3.0 (37.4) | −2.6 (27.3) | 10.8 (51.4) |
| Mean daily minimum °C (°F) | −8.3 (17.1) | −6.1 (21.0) | 0.0 (32.0) | 5.9 (42.6) | 10.2 (50.4) | 14.8 (58.6) | 17.1 (62.8) | 15.2 (59.4) | 9.9 (49.8) | 4.0 (39.2) | −1.7 (28.9) | −6.7 (19.9) | 4.5 (40.1) |
| Average precipitation mm (inches) | 24.7 (0.97) | 32.7 (1.29) | 44.4 (1.75) | 66.2 (2.61) | 56.4 (2.22) | 32.8 (1.29) | 19.8 (0.78) | 13.5 (0.53) | 16.8 (0.66) | 34.1 (1.34) | 39.9 (1.57) | 31.1 (1.22) | 412.4 (16.24) |
| Average precipitation days (≥ 1.0 mm) | 5.9 | 7.1 | 7.8 | 9.2 | 8.3 | 5.8 | 3.7 | 2.5 | 2.4 | 5.1 | 6.3 | 6.7 | 70.8 |
Source: NOAA

== See also ==
- Azerbaijanis
- Azerbaijanis in Kazakhstan
