= Merki District =

Merki
- District
- Меркі ауданы
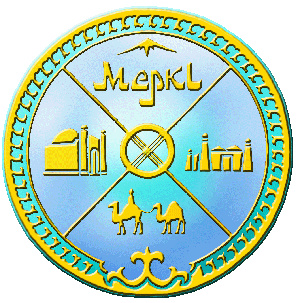
- Coat of arms

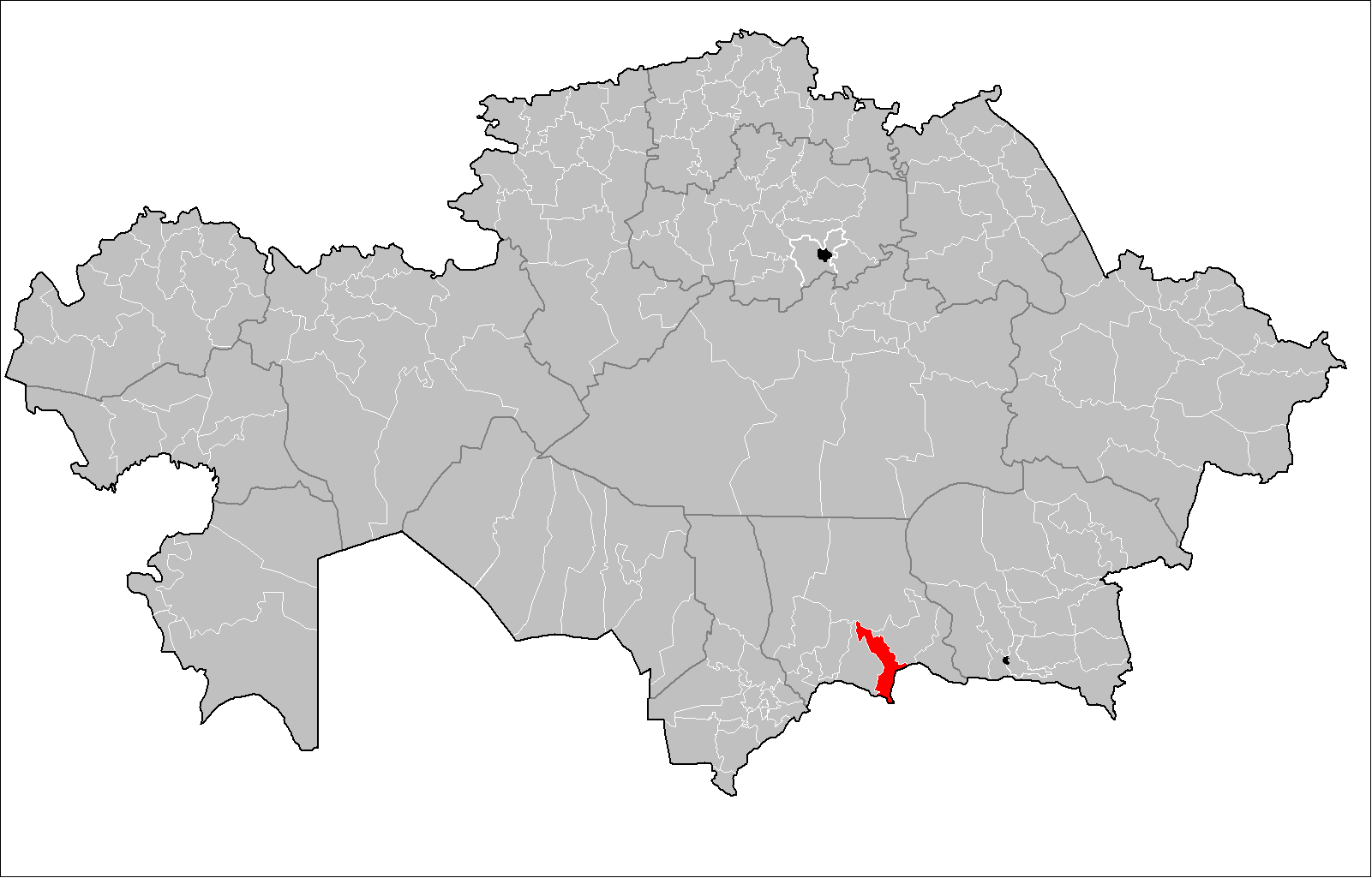
- Location of Merki District in Kazakhstan
- Coordinates: 42°52′48″N 73°10′48″E
- Country: Kazakhstan
- Region: Jambyl Region
- Administrative center: Merki
- Established: 1933

Government
  - Akim: Baubekov Zhorabek Nurmergenovich

Area
  - Total: 7,100 km^{2} (2,700 sq mi)

Population (2013)
  - Total: 81,712
- Time zone: UTC+6 (East)

Merki (Kazakh: Меркі ауданы, Merkı audany) is a district of Jambyl Region in south-eastern Kazakhstan. The administrative center of the district is the selo of Merki.

June 29, 2013 — July 2016 — was appointed akim of the district Kopbosynov Bakhtiyar Beisembaevich.

June 30, 2016 — 2021 — was appointed a new akim Umirbekov Meirkhan Azatovich.

March 2, 2021 — May 5, 2022 — was appointed a new akim Nursipatov Ruslan Maratovich.

May 16, 2022 — was appointed a new akim Baubekov Zhorabek Nurmergenovich.
