= Death and funeral of Mikhail Gorbachev =

2022 death of the final Soviet leader

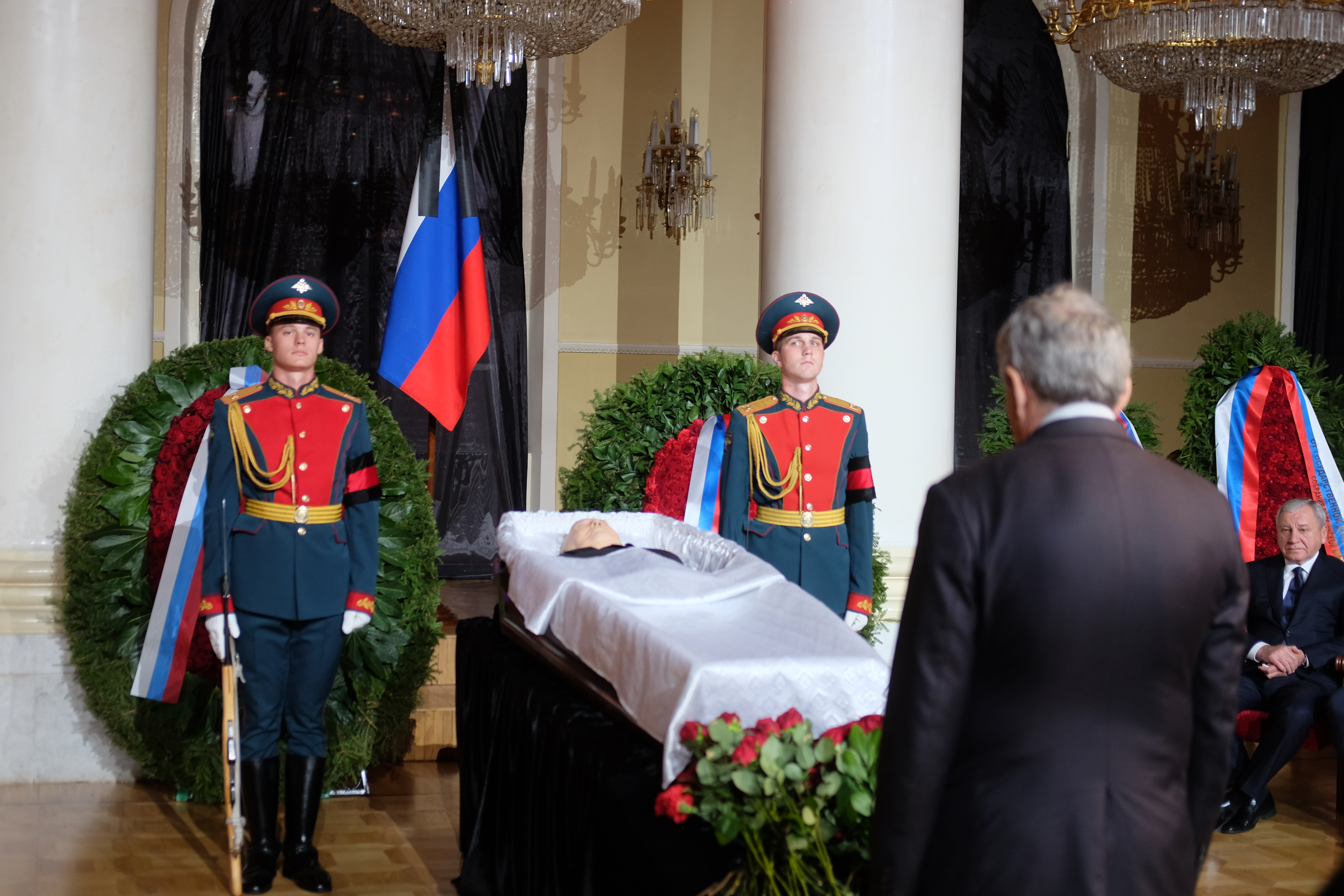
- Gorbachev's body lying in state in the House of the Unions
- Date: 3 September 2022, at 18:00 MSK (funeral service)
- Venue: House of the Unions
- Location: Moscow, Russia
- Type: Funeral
- Participants: Dmitry Muratov; Alla Pugacheva; Alexey Uminsky; Viktor Orbán; Dmitry Medvedev
- Burial: Novodevichy Cemetery

On 30 August 2022, Mikhail Gorbachev, the eighth and final general secretary and president of the Soviet Union from 1985 to 1991, died after a long illness at the Moscow Central Clinical Hospital in Russia. Gorbachev was the last living Soviet leader following the death of Georgy Malenkov in 1988, was the only one to have been born during the Soviet Union's existence, and the only one to have died after its dissolution. At the age of 91 years old, Gorbachev is the longest-lived Russian leader to date, having lived longer than Alexander Kerensky and Vasili Kuznetsov, who both died at 89 years old. On 3 September, a funeral was held for Gorbachev, and he was buried later that day.

Gorbachev's death provoked responses from many current and former world leaders and politicians.

== Funeral ==
Gorbachev's body lay in state on 3 September within the Pillar Hall of the House of the Unions in Moscow, which has historically been used to hold state funeral services for high-ranking officials and leaders, including for Joseph Stalin after his death in 1953. Notably, unlike his successor, Boris Yeltsin, Gorbachev would not be granted a state funeral. However, Kremlin spokesperson Dmitry Peskov did announce that Gorbachev would be given "elements of a state funeral", such as a guard of honor and partial government organization. It was also announced that Russian president Vladimir Putin would not attend Gorbachev's funeral, a move that attracted media attention. A statement from the Kremlin alleged this was due to his busy schedule.

A large public turnout resulted in public viewing of Gorbachev's casket and encased body being extended from two hours to four hours. This large public viewing attendance came in spite of reports that many Russians blame Gorbachev for launching reforms that caused economic chaos and for letting the Soviet Union fall apart. Despite having elements similar to a state funeral, including the national flag draping Gorbachev's coffin while being accompanied with goose-stepping guards firing shots in the air and a small band playing the Russian anthem, it was alleged that Putin avoided giving Gorbachev an official state funeral so he could avoid being obliged to attend it and also be required to invite world leaders.

Among those who attended Gorbachev's funeral were family, friends, foreign ambassadors to Russia—including ambassadors from the United States, the United Kingdom, and Germany, among others—Hungarian prime minister Viktor Orbán, and Russian government figures, including Dmitry Medvedev. Aside from Orbán, no other foreign leaders were shown to be in attendance. Presiding over the funeral procession was Gorbachev's close friend, journalist and Nobel Peace Prize laureate Dmitry Muratov. Alla Pugacheva, who was People’s Artist of the USSR, and Father Alexey Uminsky, at the time the Rector of the Holy Trinity Church in Khokhly, were among those in attendance as well. Gorbachev was buried the same day at the Novodevichy Cemetery in Moscow next to his wife, Raisa Gorbacheva, in accordance with his will.

== Reactions ==
=== Domestic ===
==== Political reaction ====
Russian president Vladimir Putin expressed his "deepest condolences" over the death of Gorbachev, and announced that he would send a telegram of condolence to his family and friends. Naina Yeltsina, widow of former Russian president Boris Yeltsin, said that Gorbachev "sincerely wanted to change the Soviet system" and transform the USSR into a "free and peaceful state". Russian prime minister Mikhail Mishustin called Gorbachev "a brilliant statesman".

State Duma deputy Vitaly Milonov (United Russia) argued that Gorbachev was "worse than Hitler for Russia". Gennady Zyuganov, General Secretary of the Communist Party of the Russian Federation, told TASS that Gorbachev was a leader whose rule brought "absolute sadness, misfortune and problems" for "all the peoples of our country".

==== Wider reaction ====
Although Gorbachev was mourned in the Western world, reactions to his death within Russia were less positive. Reporting on Gorbachev's death, Russian media had little to say regarding his death; Russian tabloid newspaper Komsomolskaya Pravda stated that Gorbachev had "changed the world too irreversibly for his ideological opponents".

Russian opposition leader Alexei Navalny, in a series of tweets, offered his condolences to Gorbachev's family and friends, stating that Gorbachev's legacy would be "evaluated far more favorably by posterity than by contemporaries". Navalny's ally, Lyubov Sobol, offered a similar sentiment, stating that the dissolution of the Soviet Union was an inevitability and "the role of Gorbachev in history in Russia will still be appreciated". Liberal journalist and a close friend of Gorbachev's Dmitry Muratov, editor of the banned opposition newspaper Novaya Gazeta, wrote in an article that Gorbachev gave Russians "thirty years of peace without a threat of a global nuclear war". Similar thoughts were echoed by Alexei Venediktov, editor of the banned Echo of Moscow radio station.

Russian former chief rabbi Pinchas Goldschmidt praised Gorbachev for lifting travel restrictions on Soviet citizens, arguing that "three million Soviet Jews owe him their freedom".

=== International ===
Allies of Gorbachev were positive in their posthumous reflection on him. Former United States secretary of state James Baker III, who had served as the White House Chief of Staff during the Reagan administration, described Gorbachev as "a giant who steered his great nation towards democracy". The Reagan Foundation released a statement in memoriam of Gorbachev. United States president Joe Biden, whom was vice president when Gorbachev had met in March 2009 following a visit to the White House, noted Gorbachev's paradigms of glasnost and perestroika and commended him for working with Ronald Reagan on ending the nuclear arms race.

António Guterres, Secretary-General of the United Nations, described Gorbachev as "a one-of-a-kind statesman who changed the course of history", going on to say that "[h]e did more than any other individual to bring about the peaceful end of the Cold War".

In Europe, European Commission president Ursula von der Leyen called Gorbachev a "trusted and respected leader". European Parliament president Roberta Metsola echoed similar sentiments.

Queen Elizabeth II in her message to the Russian people regarding Gorbachev's death recalled "much warmth" from his 1989 state visit to Great Britain, stating that "through his courage and vision, he gained the admiration, affection and respect of the British people". Her personal statement was made public by the Embassy of the United Kingdom, Moscow, in its official Vkontakte account. The Queen died only nine days after Gorbachev.

Former German chancellor Angela Merkel referenced the fall of the Berlin Wall in her statement regarding Gorbachev's death. Merkel, who hails from East Germany, said that the "world has lost a one-of-a-kind world leader" and that he "wrote history". Likewise, then incumbent German chancellor Olaf Scholz commented on Gorbachev dissolving the Iron Curtain, and praised for help making it possible for Germany to reunite. French president Emmanuel Macron, like Merkel, noted that Gorbachev "changed common history".

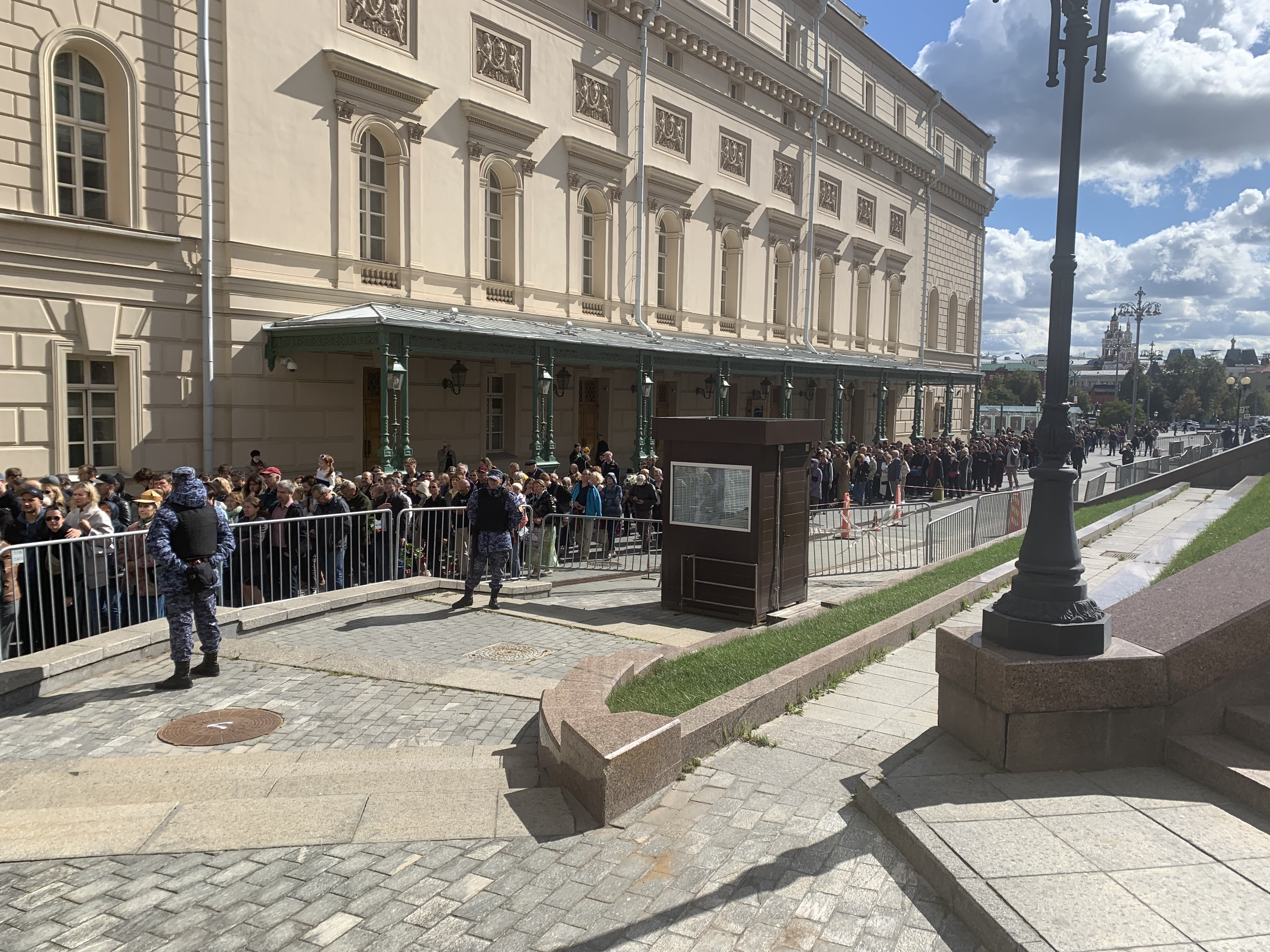
Thousands of people wishing to say goodbye to Gorbachev queuing from Theater Square through Kopevsky Lane and Bolshaya Dmitrovka

Australian prime minister Anthony Albanese called Gorbachev a "man of warmth, hope, resolve and enormous courage". Former prime minister Paul Keating also sent condolences.

Through a press secretariat, Bulgarian president Rumen Radev condoled with Gorbachev's family, citing Gorbachev's belief in free will as a catalyst for the unification of Europe. Romanian president Klaus Iohannis and former president Ion Iliescu both made comments in the wake of his death.

Canadian prime minister Justin Trudeau commended Gorbachev for his accomplishments during his time. Former prime minister Brian Mulroney also sent condolences.

Israeli president Isaac Herzog described Gorbachev as a "brave and visionary leader".

Japanese prime minister Fumio Kishida, in a news conference, praised Gorbachev for "supporting the abolishment of nuclear weapons"; Kishida hails from Hiroshima.

Ministry of Foreign Affairs of China spokesperson Zhao Lijian offered condolences to Gorbachev's family stating that he "made positive contribution to the normalization of relations between China and the Soviet Union." Despite Zhao's condolences, Gorbachev's death had mixed reactions in China, where he was credited with normalizing Sino-Soviet relations, but at the same time negatively viewed for bringing about the dissolution of the Soviet Union, as the Chinese Communist Party views the fall of the Soviet Union a "major ideological catastrophe that cast a shadow over their own future."

== See also ==
- Death and state funeral of Vladimir Lenin
- Death and state funeral of Joseph Stalin
- Death and state funeral of Leonid Brezhnev
- Death and state funeral of Boris Yeltsin
