= Holy Rus' =

Eurasian religious and philosophical concept

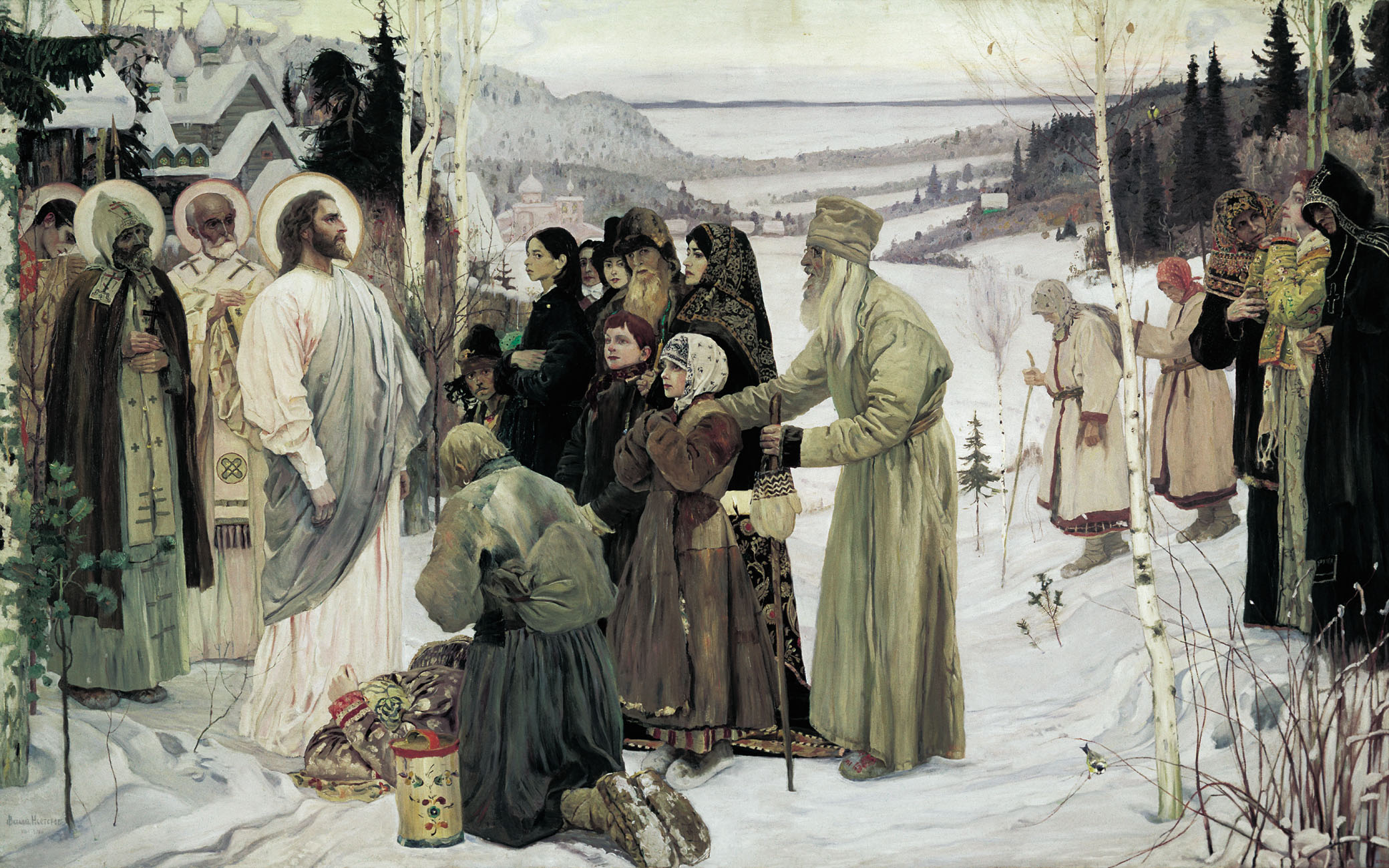
Holy Rus: a picture by the Russian painter Mikhail Nesterov, 1901-1906

Holy Rus' or Holy Russia (Russian: Святая Русь, romanized: Svyatáya Rusʹ) is a religious and philosophical concept which first appeared in the 9th century, then developed gradually from the 16th century to the 21st century in Grand Duchy of Moscow, East Europe, Central Eurasia and Great Russia. As a concept it has several meanings. It designates the Russian land as chosen by God and enlightened by the Christian faith. However, among the other spaces, Holy Rus' is not distinguished by geography, nor by the state it constitutes, nor by ethnicity, but by Eastern Orthodox Christianity.

== History ==
This religious concept developed through the ages in close connection with Orthodox Russian Christianity, which cannot be understood completely without the idea of Holy Rus'.

The idea of Holy Rus' can be explained as the idea of Kingdom of Heaven well-known to every Christian around the world, but developed in the realities of society of Central Eurasia under the strong influence of ancient East Slavic Orthodox Christian culture.

The idea made great impact on the emergence and development of many states and societies in East Europe and Central Eurasia through the centuries: the ancient principality of Rus' (the Kievan Rus'), the Eastern Slavic principalities in the state structure of the Mongol Empire, Empire of the Great Horde, the Russian Tsardom and Russian Empire of the 16th to 20th centuries and even on the emergence and development of the Soviet Union which gave birth to the modern Russian, Ukrainian and Belarusian republics:

As sons and daughters of the Russian Orthodox Church, we are all citizens of Holy Russia. When we speak of Holy Russia, we are not talking about the Russian Federation or any civil society on earth; rather, it is a way of life that has been passed down to us through the centuries by such great saints of the Russian Land as the Holy Great Prince Vladimir and Great Princess Olga, Venerable Sergius of Radonezh, Job of Pochaev, Seraphim of Sarov, and more recently, the countless New Martyrs and Confessors of the 20th century. These saints are our ancestors, and we must look to them for instruction on how to bravely confess the Faith, even when facing persecution. There is no achievement in simply calling oneself "Russian:" in order to be a genuine Russian, one must first become Orthodox and live a life in the Church, as did our forebears, the founders of Holy Russia!

— Metropolitan Hilarion (Kapral) of New York

== See also ==
- Moscow, third Rome
- Russian world
- Holy Rus (organization)
- Kingship and kingdom of God

== Sources ==
- "Holy Russia": A Study in the History of an Idea
- Иконичный образ святости: пространственные, временные, религиозные и историософские категории Святой Руси. part 1
