= Holy Rus (organization) =

Orthodox Christian Organisation in Russia

Holy Rus (Russian: Свята́я Русь, Svyataya Rus) is a Russian Orthodox Christian organisation in Russia, headed by Ivan Otrakovsky. The organisation established an Orthodox Christian patrol squad in August 2012 in order to protect Christian churches from desecration by vandals, informing the police or stopping the criminal if necessary. In addition, the squads also deal with individuals who sneer at priests. The leader of the group, Ivan Otrakovsky, stated that:

The time has come to remind all apostates and theomachists that it is our land and we forbid blasphemous, offensive actions and statements against the Orthodox religion and our people. An Orthodox believer in God is very calm and moderate. We don’t have any personal enemies, just the enemies of faith.

Holy Rus stated that its patrol squads will also target individuals insulting God or displaying sacrilegious symbols, such as an inverted cross. There are currently seven volunteer squads operating in Russia and the number is expected to grow. "Blasphemy, heresy, defilement and lechery" are offences that Holy Rus will aim to curb.
