= Alexey Uminsky =

Russian Eastern Orthodox priest (born 1960)

Protoiereus Alexey Uminsky
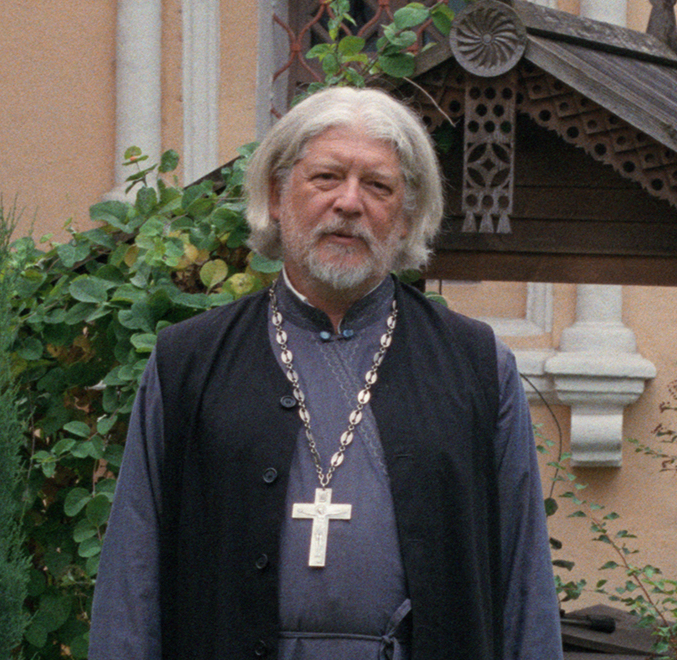
- Uminsky in 2017
- Native name: Алексей Анатольевич Уминский
- Church: Constantinople Orthodox Church
- See: France
- Installed: 27 May 1990

Orders
- Rank: protopriest

Personal details
- Born: 3 July 1960 (age 66) Moscow, Russian SFSR, Soviet Union
- Profession: Cleric; teacher; writer; TV presenter; blogger
- Education: Krupskaya Moscow Regional Pedagogical Institute (1982); Moscow Theological Academy (2004)

Alexey Anatolyevich Uminsky (Russian: Алексей Анатольевич Уминский; born 3 July 1960) is an Eastern Orthodox priest from Russia. Since 27 February 2024, he has been a protoiereus of the Church of Constantinople.

From 1993 until early January 2024, he served as the rector of the Moscow Church of the Life-Giving Holy Trinity. On 3 January 2024, he was suspended from ministry and subjected to an ecclesiastical court, which on 13 January of the same year ruled that he "is subject to defrocking for violating the priestly Oath (perjury)". On 27 February 2024, he was restored to the holy priesthood and received into the Ecumenical Patriarchate of Constantinople. Since April 2024, he has been a cleric at the Church of the Sign of the Mother of God in Paris (Greek Orthodox Metropolis of France).

== Biography ==
Alexey's parents were non-believers, his father was an engineer, and his mother was a teacher of Belarusian origin. He grew up in Perovo District. In his youth, he was a hippie, about which, by his own admission, he wishes to ask his parents for forgiveness, and he also worked as a night watchman at the Shchusev Museum of Architecture. He was baptized in 1980, at the age of 20.

In 1982, he graduated from the Romance and Germanic languages department of the Krupskaya Moscow Regional Pedagogical Institute (now State University of Education). For eight years, he worked as a French teacher at a comprehensive school. During this time, he met his future wife through mutual acquaintances.

In the late 1980s, archimandrite John Krestiankin blessed him for the path to priesthood. On 27 May 1990, he was ordained a deacon, and on 9 September 1990, ordained a presbyter. He served at the Church of the Icon of the Mother of God "Joy of All Who Sorrow" in the town of Klin, Moscow Oblast. His parents began to join the Church when he was already preparing to become a priest, and later he himself officiated at his parents' wedding. From 1990, he served as rector of the Dormition of the Mother of God Cathedral in Kashira, Moscow Oblast and dean of the churches of the Kashira Deanery of the Moscow Diocese.

In 1993, he was appointed rector of the Church of the Life-Giving Holy Trinity in Khokhly, Moscow.

In 2002, he was elevated to the rank of protopriest. In 2004, he graduated from the Moscow Theological Academy.

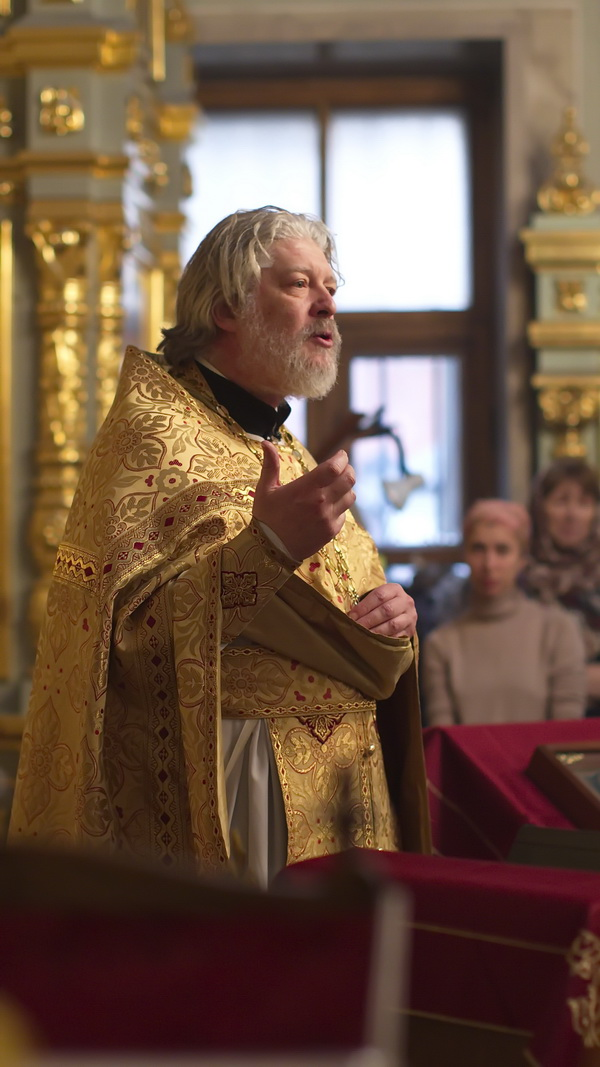
Protopriest Alexey Uminsky delivering a sermon at the St. Nicholas's Church in Kotelniki, December 2014

On 3 September 2022, Father Alexey Uminsky presided over the funeral of former Soviet president Mikhail Gorbachev at the Novodevichy Cemetery.

On 16 November 16, 2023, Father Uminsky gave an interview to Alexei Venediktov criticizing the use of military rhetoric by priests, including during the liturgy. Thus, responding to a question from a listener, Father Alexey advised Orthodox believers who did not want to attend a church where they "pray for victory and in support of the special military operation" to seek out priests who "try not too much to reinforce the military spirit during the liturgy" and who "pray more for peace than for victory". Shortly after the interview, commenting on Uminsky's words, Bishop Pitirim Tvorogov of the Russian Orthodox Church described Uminsky's position as "one of the metastases of the terrible disease of liberalism, which has penetrated our Church and will destroy our homeland".

On 3 January 2024, by decree of Patriarch Kirill of Moscow, Uminsky was removed from his rectorship and suspended from ministry. Analyzing the removal of the rector, media and church-public figures linked Uminsky's suspension to his anti-war and pacifist statements.

On 13 January 2024, according to media reports, the diocesan court of the Moscow Diocese ruled that "on the basis of Rule 25 of the Apostolic Canons, Father Alexey Uminsky is subject to defrocking for violating the priestly Oath (perjury) — namely, for refusing to fulfill the Patriarchal blessing to read the prayer for Holy Rus' during the Divine Liturgy". The court's decision was made in his absence, as Uminsky did not appear at any of the three court sessions. The decision was forwarded to Patriarch Kirill for approval. According to media reports, the court's decision was approved by the Patriarch on February 8 of the same year.

Uminsky appealed to Ecumenical Patriarch Bartholomew I of Constantinople, who, based on the appellate right of the Patriarchs of Constantinople (Canons 9 and 17 of the Fourth Ecumenical Council of Chalcedon), accepted it and, "having considered the appeal in its entirety, submitted for the consideration of the Holy Synod the lifting of the imposed defrocking and the restoration of the cleric to his former ecclesiastical rank, which was unanimously decided" on 27 February 2024. Following this, he was received into the clergy of the Church of Constantinople by the Ecumenical Patriarch.
