= St. Nicholas Cathedral (Almaty) =

St. Nikolai Cathedral
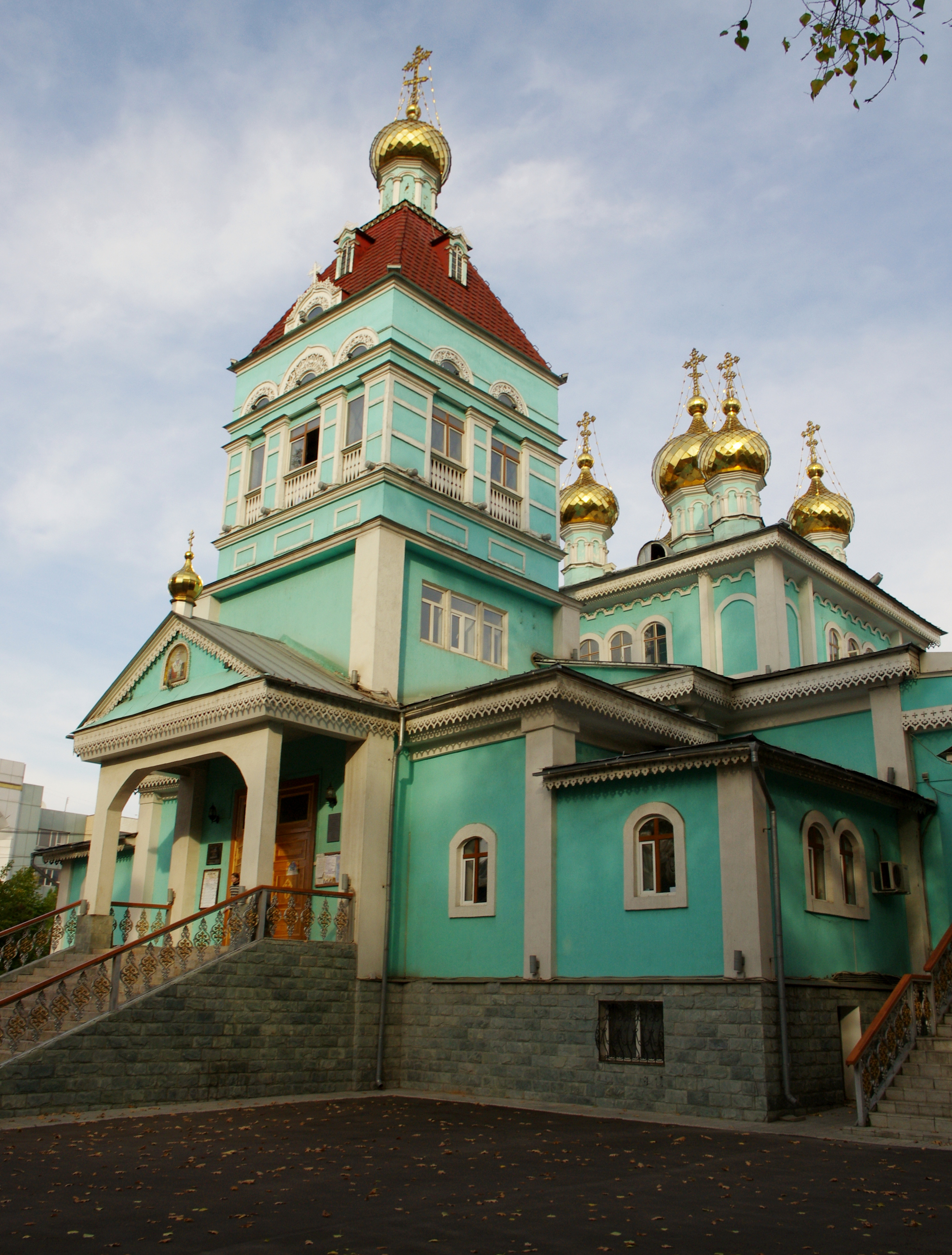
- St. Nikolai Cathedral
- 43°14′54″N 76°55′41″E
- Location: Almaty
- Country: Kazakhstan
- Denomination: Russian Orthodox
- Website: https://nikolski.kz/

Architecture
- Architectural type: eclecticism
- Years built: 1906-1908

Administration
- Diocese: Astana and Almaty diocese

St. Nicholas Cathedral (Russian: Свято-Никольский Собор, tr. sviato nikolskii sobor, Kazakh: Қасиетті Николай ғибадатханасы, romanized: Qasiettı Nikolai ğibadathanasy) is a Russian Orthodox cathedral of the Astana and Almaty diocese in the city of Almaty, Kazakhstan.

== Pre-revolutionary period ==
In 1904, the residents of the southwestern part of Verny appealed to Bishop Paisy of Turkestan and Tashkent for permission to raise funds and collect donations to build a church on Zubov Square. On 13 February 1906, Andrey Zenkov, the executor of the technical projects of Verny and the head of the church construction works of the city and other places of Turkestan diocese, informed bishop Antony, during a visit to Turkestan cathedral, that the question of the construction was resolved. On 14 December 1908 the new church in Verny, designed by architect S. K. Troparevsky, was consecrated in honor of Saint Nicholas. Father Alexander Skalsky was appointed rector of the church.

Architecturally, the building is a seven-domed, ship-shaped church with high vaults and belfry, with azure domes.

== Soviet period ==
In 1918, Bishop Pimen of Vernensk and Semirechensk was shot, after which the post of bishop of Alma-Ata remained vacant until 1927.

Simultaneously with the arrest of Bishop Aleksandr in February 1936, St. Nicholas Church was closed. Its premises were used as a museum of atheism.

On 5 July 1945, the post of bishop of Alma-Ata, which had been vacant since 1937, was replaced by a decision of the Holy Synod. On 8 December 1946 Bishop Nikolai consecrated the first renovated chapel in honor of Saint Barbara, and a week later, on 15 December the main chapel was consecrated, in honor of Saint Nicholas. St. Nicholas Church was made the cathedral of the diocese.

== Kazakhstani period ==
In 1995, the cathedra of the bishop of Kazakhstan diocese was transferred from St. Nicholas Cathedral to the restored Ascension Cathedral. As per the decision of the akim of Almaty on 28 November 1995 № 63 "On inclusion in the state list of historical and cultural monuments of local importance of the Almaty St. Nicholas Cathedral" the building was included in the list of sites protected by the state.

The first Sunday School enrollment was organized in 1991. In 2010 the new Sunday School building was consecrated.

In 2012, a monument to St. Nicholas was placed in front of the cathedral.
