= Alexander Mogilyov =

Metropolitan of Astana and Kazakhstan

Aleksandr Mogilyov
- Metropolitan of Astana and Kazakhstan; Митрополит Астанайский и Казахстанский
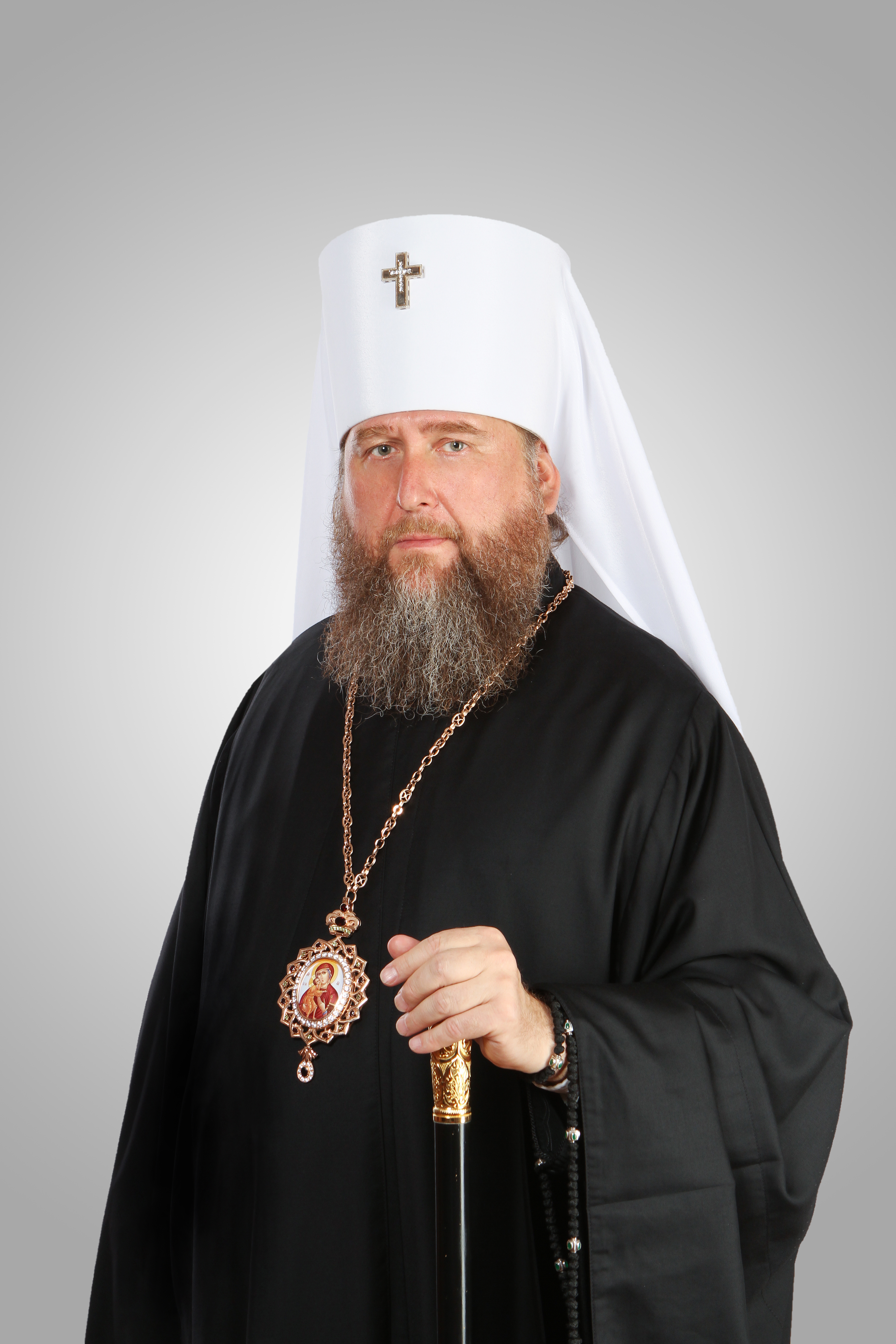
- Native name: Александр Геннадиевич Могилёв
- Church: Russian Orthodox Church
- Predecessor: Mefody Nemtsov

Personal details
- Born: Aleksandr Gennadiyevich Mogilyov; 18 May 1957 (age 69) Kirov, Kirov Oblast
- Education: Saint Petersburg Theological Seminary; Moscow Theological Academy

Metropolitan Alexander (Russian: Митрополит Александр; secular name Aleksandr Gennadiyevich Mogilyov, (Note: In this name that follows East Slavic naming customs, the patronymic is Gennadiyevich and the family name is Mogilyov.) Russian: Александр Геннадиевич Могилёв; born 18 May 1957) is a bishop of the Russian Orthodox Church; Metropolitan of Astana and Kazakhstan, head of the Kazakhstan Metropolitan District, permanent member of the Holy Synod of the Russian Orthodox Church.

== Biography ==
Born on May 18, 1957, in a working-class family in the city of Kirov, Kirov Oblast. From 1963 to 1974 he studied at secondary school No. 14 in Kirov. In 1975 he entered the Leningrad Theological Seminary, which he graduated in 1977 with first class.

From 1977 to 1980 he studied at the Leningrad Theological Academy (did not graduate). In 1979 he was sent to Kirov, where until 1983 he was the personal secretary of the Bishop of Kirov and Slobodskoy Chrysanth (Chepil).

On August 1, 1983, Bishop Chrysanth (Chepil) of Kirov and Slobodskoy ordained him to the rank of deacon. On August 2 of the same year he was ordained to the rank of priest.

Since December 1983, he served as keykeeper of the Seraphim Cathedral in the city of Kirov. In 1985 he was elevated to the rank of archpriest. From 1986 to 1989 he was the secretary of the Kirov diocesan administration. Since November 1987 - rector of the Seraphim Cathedral in the city of Kirov.

On September 13, 1989, Patriarch of Moscow and all Rus', Pimen and the Holy Synod of the Russian Orthodox Church elected him as Bishop of Kostroma and Galich. On September 21, 1989, he was tonsured a monk with the name Alexander in honor of the Venerable Alexander of Svir. On September 24, 1989, he was elevated to the rank of archimandrite.

On September 27, 1989, in the Epiphany Cathedral in Moscow, he was consecrated to the rank of Bishop of Kostroma and Galich. The ordination was performed by: Metropolitan Vladimir (Sabodan) of Rostov and Novocherkassk, Archbishop Valentin (Mishchuk) of Vladimir and Suzdal, Archbishop Isidore (Kirichenko) of Krasnodar and Kuban, Archbishop Chrysanth (Chepil) of Kirov and Slobodskoy, Bishops Niphon (Saikali) of Philippopolis, Bishop Victor (Oleinik) Kalinin and Kashin and Bishop Sergius (Poletkin) of Azov.

In 1990, he graduated in absentia from the Moscow Theological Academy with a candidate of theology degree for the essay “The Hieromartyr Nicodemus, Archbishop of Kostroma and Galich (1868-1938).”

On May 8, 1990, by decision of the Holy Synod, he was included in the Synodal Biblical Commission. In 1990-1993 he was a deputy of the Kostroma Regional Council of People's Deputies.

On January 25, 1991, at the First Congress of Orthodox Youth, he was elected chairman of the All-Church Orthodox Youth Movement.

On February 18, 1992, he was appointed member of the commission for the preparation and holding in 1992 of the celebration of the 600th anniversary of the repose of Sergius of Radonezh.

From November 2 to December 17, 1993, he temporarily ruled the Diocese of Yaroslavl and Rostov. On February 25, 1994, he was elevated to the rank of archbishop. Since February 26, 1994 he is member of the Synodal Theological Commission.

From November 11, 1994, to April 19, 2000, he was a member of the Council for Youth Affairs under the President of the Russian Federation. Since 2000 he is the chairman of the Synodal Department for Youth Affairs. On November 13, 2008, Archbishop Alexander was awarded the degree of Doctor of Theology from the Uzhgorod Theological Academy named after Saints Cyril and Methodius.

On March 5, 2010, by decision of the Holy Synod, the Archbishop of Astana and Alma-Ata was instructed to temporarily fulfill the duties of chairman of the Department of Youth Affairs. On July 26, 2010, by decision of the Holy Synod, the title of Astana and Kazakhstan was awarded. On July 28, 2010, during a service in the Kiev Pechersk Lavra, Patriarch Kirill elevated him to the rank of metropolitan.

On October 6, 2010, the Holy Synod decided to relieve Metropolitan Alexander of Astana and Kazakhstan from the post of chairman of the Synodal Department for Youth Affairs, and also appoint him as temporary manager of the Karaganda diocese.

On July 26, 2011, he was introduced to the Human Rights Commission under the President of the Republic of Kazakhstan. On October 5, 2011, being Metropolitan of Astana and Kazakhstan, he was included in the permanent members of the Holy Synod of the Russian Orthodox Church, and was also appointed temporary administrator of the Kokshetau diocese (ruled until October 23, 2013).

By order of Patriarch Kirill dated March 14, 2012, he was appointed the Patriarchal Metochion and the representative office of the Metropolitan District of the Russian Orthodox Church in the Republic of Kazakhstan.

On December 4, 2017, Patriarch Kirill awarded the right to wear the second panagia.

On August 25, 2020, by decision of the Holy Synod, temporary management of the Kostanay diocese was entrusted to him. Since 2021 he is the temporary administrator of the Chimkent diocese. Since March 24, 2022 - temporary administrator of the Ural and Atyrau diocese. From August 25 to December 29, 2022, he was the acting rector of the Alma-Ata Theological Seminary.
