= Changgeng =

Changgeng (長庚), meaning "the excellent west one", is a historical Chinese name for the planet Venus.

Changgeng may also refer to:

== People ==
- Changgeng, Qing's last Viceroy of Shaan-Gan
- Cheng Changgeng (1811–1880), a Qing dynasty opera artist
- Li Changgeng (李长庚), a contestant in Idol Producer

== Places ==
- Changgeng Subdistrict (长庚街道), Wuling, Changde, Hunan Province, China
- Changgeng Village (长庚村), Taiping Township, Wudalianchi, Heihe, Heilongjiang, China
- Linkou Chang Gung Memorial Hospital, a hospital in Guishan District, Taoyuan City, Taiwan
