= Xu Xin =

Xu Xin may refer to:

- Xu Xiaoxiang (1832–?), actor during the Qing dynasty
- Xu Xin (Judaic scholar) (born 1949), Chinese scholar
- Xu Xin (table tennis) (born 1990), Chinese table tennis player
- Xu Xin (footballer) (born 1994), Chinese footballer

== See also ==
- Xu Xing (disambiguation)
