= Xu Xiaoxiang =

Qing dynasty kunqu and Peking opera artist

- Born: Xu Xin; January 11, 1832; Wu County, Jiangsu, Qing Empire
- Died: Disputed, c. 1882? or 1888? or 1902? or 1912? Wu County?
- Occupations: Peking opera and kunqu performer
- Employer: Three Celebrations Troupe
- Known for: Xiaosheng roles

Chinese name
- Chinese: 徐小香
Transcriptions
Standard Mandarin
- Hanyu Pinyin: Xú Xiǎoxiāng

Xu Xin
- Chinese: 徐炘
Transcriptions
Standard Mandarin
- Hanyu Pinyin: Xú Xīn

Xu Xinyi
- Chinese: 徐心一
Transcriptions
Standard Mandarin
- Hanyu Pinyin: Xú Xīnyī

Diexian
- Chinese: 蝶仙
- Literal meaning: Butterfly fairy
Transcriptions
Standard Mandarin
- Hanyu Pinyin: Diéxiān

Xu Xiaoxiang (11 January 1832 – ?), born Xu Xin, courtesy name Xinyi and art name Diexian, was a Qing dynasty kunqu and Peking opera artist based in Beijing. He specialized in portraying xiaosheng roles, or younger gentlemen. His best known roles included Zhou Yu in Meeting of Heroes (群英會), Xu Xian in Legend of the White Snake, and Liu Mengmei in The Peony Pavilion.

He was a member of the famed Three Celebrations Troupe led by Cheng Changgeng.

== Biography ==
Xu Xiaoxiang's biographical information mainly came from his student Cao Xinquan (曹心泉). According to Cao, Xu Xiaoxiang was born as Xu Xin in Wu County, Suzhou, Jiangsu, though his ancestral home was Changzhou, Jiangsu. When he was still a child, he went to the Qing dynasty capital Beijing to learn Peking opera, receiving his first trainings in Yinxiu Hall (吟秀堂). He imitated the styles of Hubei native Long Deyun (龍德雲) and Beijing native Cao Meixian (曹眉仙), both xiaosheng actors, forging his own style from their strengths.

Once he graduated from the training school, Xu Xiaoxiang joined Cheng Changgeng's Three Celebrations Troupe. He was able to play both civil and martial xiaosheng roles, and sing both kunqu and Peking opera arie. He had a handsome face and a resonant voice, beautiful singing in both real voice and falsetto, and graceful movements which demonstrated his charisma. He was a versatile actor who could handle with ease the hand fans used by poor scholars and pheasant plumes worn by generals on their helmets. Theatre historian Qi Rushan considered him the most complete actor of his time because he could portray any xiaosheng role creatively.

One day in 1852, Xu Xiaoxiang rescued a young boy from the savage beatings by one of his colleagues. As the story went, the boy was an indentured apprentice apparently sold to this opera actor, who abused him. Xu first tried to intervene and stop the thrashings; when that failed he bought this boy from his colleague and brought him home. The boy was from a good family, but his parents both died, and he was brought to Beijing by smugglers. Xu also learned that he had an uncle in Beijing, so he quickly arranged for their reunion. He returned the child to the uncle, who insisted on giving him a loan receipt. Xu burnt it right away, exclaiming, "I have received it!" This chivalrous anecdote quickly spread through Beijing, not only among the hoi polloi but also among the educated elite.

Xu Xiaoxiang once took an eight-year hiatus from Three Celebrations Troupe which followed a quarrel with Cheng Changgeng. During this period, he didn't join any other troupe, and only performed at occasional private parties. Nevertheless, he trained every day, starting with vocal practices and acrobatic drills before breakfast, and ending with two or three songs in the afternoon during which he sang while playing an instrument. He was often seen rocking his head, an important skill for a performer wearing the pheasant-plume helmet. Later, faced with a sagging audience, Cheng Changgeng sent Zhang Tianyuan (張天元) to invite Xu Xiaoxiang back. Xu laid out three conditions. The first two were reasonable requests concerning payments, which even stipulated that he wouldn't want any payment if he were absent, or if the theatre were not full, or if viewers left prematurely. Otherwise, Cheng was to pay him in full for both performance and transportation. The third condition was for Cheng to come and invite him in person. Cheng did just that, and indeed the theatre filled up every day after Xu's return.

Xu Xiaoxiang was prideful, but he could also be humble when it comes to performance. His best-known role was Zhou Yu, who in the stories had an intense jealousy of his rival Zhuge Liang. At first, Xu in his role would shudder whenever Zhou Yu was in a fit of anger. An audience member questioned his acting, noting that Zhou Yu was after all a military commander and was unlikely to show his emotions in such an exaggerated manner. Xu took his comment seriously. He modified his acting so that whenever Zhou Yu was furious, his body and head would remain steady, but the long pheasant plumes attached to his helmet would tremble. It showed Zhou Yu trying but unable to control his rage. This change was warmly welcomed by his audience.

When Cheng Changgeng died in 1880, Xu Xiaoxiang was one of those who managed his funeral. Shortly after, he sold his Beijing residence and returned to his hometown, possibly in 1882–83. Different sources differ on exactly when he died, with 1882, 1888, 1902, and 1912 all offered as possible years.

== In popular culture ==
Hui opera star Li Longbin (李龙斌) portrayed Xu Xiaoxiang in the 1994 TV series Big Boss Cheng Changgeng (大老板程長庚). In the 2002 comedy TV series The Best Clown Under Heaven (天下第一丑), Xu Xiaoxiang is portrayed by Peking opera actor Liu Changcheng (刘长城).

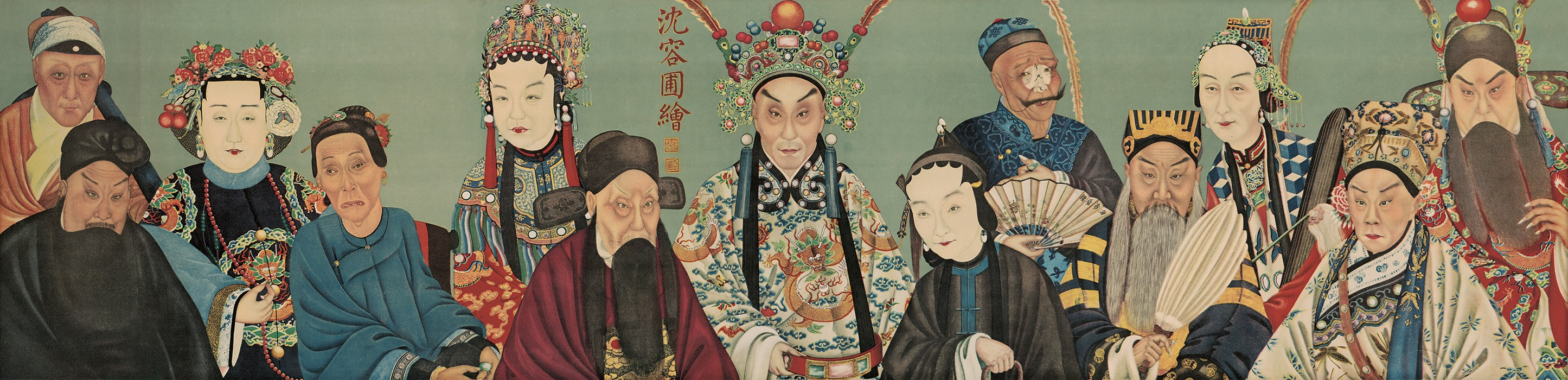
Thirteen Masters of the Tongzhi and Guangxu Reigns (同光十三絕), a painting allegedly by the late Qing dynasty court painter Shen Rongpu (沈容圃). Xu Xiaoxiang is 7th from the left, dressed in the role of Zhou Yu and wearing the pheasant-plume helmet.
