= Masanchi =

Masanchi Масанчи
- Village
- Interactive map of Masanchi
- Location of Masanchi within Kazakhstan
- Coordinates: 42.9289°N 75.3019°E
- Country: Kazakhstan
- Region: Jambyl Region
- District: Korday District

Population
  - Total: 13,606

Masanchi (Kazakh: Масанчи / Masantşi; Dungan: Масанчин) is a predominantly Dungan village in the Korday District of the Jambyl Province in Kazakhstan, located near the border with Kyrgyzstan. It is approximately 45 km southeast of the village of Korday, and approximately 130 km southwest of the city of Almaty.

The village is mainly inhabited by Dungan people, a people of Hui (Chinese Muslim) origin.

== Names ==
Town was originally called Karakunuz (Russian: Каракунуз, sometimes Караконыз or Караконуз), which means "black beetle" in Turkic languages. The Dungans themselves used to refer to Karakunuz as Ingpan (Dungan: Инпан; Russian: Иньпан; Chinese: 營盤; pinyin: Yíngpán), which is an archaic word in Chinese languages for "military camp."

From 1903 to 1918, the town was briefly renamed Nikolaevka after Tsar Nicholas II of Russia. In 1965, Karakunuz was renamed Masanchi (sometimes spelt as "Masanchin"), after Magaza Masanchi or Masanchin (Dungan: Магәзы Масанчын; Chinese: 马三奇), a Dungan participant in the Communist Revolution and a Soviet Kazakhstan statesman.

== Demographics ==
Historical population
Year	Pop.	±%
1999	8,926	—
2009	13,606	+52.4%

According to the 2009 Census, the village of Masanchi had a population of 13,606 people, and the administrative district governing the village had a population of 14,502. The 1999 Census reported populations of 8,926 and 9,608, respectively. Of the 13,606 people in the village, 6,914 people were reported as men, and 6,692 were reported as women.

== Ethnic conflict ==
On 5 February 2020, a conflict between Kazakhs and Dungans broke out over the alleged beating of an elderly Kazakh man by a Dungan man. The subsequent clashes have reportedly killed 11 Dungan, caused the arrest of 47 more, and resulted in damage to local properties.
