= Changgeng (Irgen Gioro) =

Changgeng (長庚, 1843–1914), courtesy name Shaobai (少白), was a Qing official of the Irgen Gioro clan and a member of the Manchu Plain Yellow Banner. Originating from the Jiangning Banner Garrison, he participated in the suppression of the Dungan Revolt in the northwestern and later served as Imperial Minister in Tibet, General of Ili, General of Chengdu, Minister of War, and ultimately Qing's last Viceroy of Shaanxi and Gansu.

== Biography ==
Before joining Nurhaci's military forces, Changgeng's ancestors lived in Yehe. According to the family anecdote, they were descendants of the Northern Song migrants who had been taken north with Emperors Huizong and Qinzong by the Jurchen dynasty and were granted the imperial surname by the House of Zhao. In 1619, Nurhaci bestowed his ancestors the surname Gioro. After the Qing conquest of China, his ancestor Boosifu was assigned to the Jiangning Garrison (江寧駐防).

Changgeng was born in Gansu, where his father Kuiying (魁瀛) was then serving as an official. After returning to Jiangning, his family was devastated during the Taiping Rebellion, in which more than fifty relatives were killed. He escaped with his mother and sought refuge with Jinglian (景廉), the General of Suiyuan and family friend. Beginning his career as a county assistant magistrate, he was later recommended for commission as Banner army officer under Ili General Rongquan. During the Dungan uprisings in Xinjiang led by Bai Yanhu, Changgeng organized local militia forces and, together with Qing's regular troops, defeated the rebels and relieved the siege of Shashanzi (沙山子). He subsequently served under Jinchun (景春), managing military affairs. In 1880, he was appointed Commander of Bayandai. After completing the mourning period for his mother, he was received by the Guangxu Emperor, to whom he presented hand-drawn maps and detailed proposals concerning frontier defense. These included fortifying the Altai region, strengthening Ili's border defenses, establishing military colonies, pacifying the steppe tribes, and organizing the Kazakhs into banner companies. He was then promoted to Deputy Commander of Banner Armies Ili.

In 1888, Changgeng was appointed Imperial Minister in Tibet. While en route, a rebellion broke out in the Nyarong region. After investigating the causes, he determined that the unrest stemmed from abuses committed by local Tibetan officials. He coordinated Han and Tibetan forces to suppress the uprising and punished the officials responsible. He further argued against annexing the region to Sichuan, maintaining that doing so would undermine Qing credibility among Tibetans. His recommendations were accepted, and the crisis was peacefully resolved.

In 1890, he was promoted to General of Ili. Xinjiang was still recovering from years of turmoil, and Changgeng undertook extensive administrative reforms. At the same time, both Britain and Russia were exerting pressure along the frontier. In correspondence with Governor Tao Mo (陶模) of Xinjiang, he advocated caution, arguing that the empire should defend its territory but avoid provoking a major conflict with stronger foreign powers. He also played a leading role in negotiations concerning the return of the Barluk Mountain region, which had been leased to Russia. Through persistent diplomatic efforts, the Qing government successfully recovered the territory. During the Dungan uprising in Gansu in 1894, Changgeng blocked strategic routes leading from Xinjiang toward Russia, preventing rebel forces from escaping and forcing their surrender near Lop Nur. In 1896, he concurrently served as Commander of the Han Chinese Bordered Blue Banner. During the Boxer Rebellion, Russian troops entered Ili. Changgeng negotiated directly with the Russian consul, guaranteeing protection for churches and Russian property, which led to the withdrawal of Russian forces. He was later appointed General of Chengdu but was ordered first to conduct border surveys in the Altai region. Soon afterward, he was recalled to Beijing and appointed the Minister of War.

In 1905, he again became General of Ili. He submitted numerous proposals concerning military finance, administrative restructuring in Xinjiang, military colonies, provincial reorganization, and railway construction, but none were implemented. In 1909, Changgeng was appointed Viceroy of Shaan-Gan. Following the outbreak of the 1911 Revolution, he joined General Zhirui and Governor Shengyun in planning to relocate the emperorPuyi to the northwest and establish a restorationist base west of Tongguan. However, before executing, the Qing emperor accepted the Articles of Favourable Treatment of the Great Qing Emperor after His Abdication and the dynasty came to an end.

After returning to Beijing, Changgeng declined an invitation from President Yuan Shikai to serve in the newly formed Beiyang government. He died in 1914 and was posthumously granted the honorific name Gonghou (恭厚, “Respectful and Magnanimous”) by the enclaved Qing court in the Forbidden City. Changgeng's only son was Zhao Xinyu (趙欣余), courtesy name Peiyuan (培元). His granddaughter Songqin (誦琴) married Yuyun (毓運), a grandson of Zaiyi, Prince Duan.
