= Ji Qilin =

Chinese actor

- Born: May 27, 1947 (age 77); Republic of China
- Spouse: Zhang Bailing (张百灵) (m. 1973)
- Children: Ji Chenmu

Chinese name
- Chinese: 姬麒麟
Transcriptions
Standard Mandarin
- Hanyu Pinyin: Jī Qílín

Ji Qilin (born 27 May 1947) is a Chinese actor.

== Biography ==
Ji Qilin was born in 1947 to two deployed soldiers on their way south during the Chinese Civil War. Because of the war, he grew up in his grandmother's house in Liaocheng, Shandong until the age of 5, when he and his grandmother joined his parents in Beijing. When he was 11, he was admitted to Beijing Chinese Opera School (北京戏曲学校). Two years later, his parents were relocated to Guangzhou, leaving Ji Qilin by himself in Beijing. At school, he trained to become a Peking opera wusheng performer under Hou Hailin (侯海林), a disciple of Yang Xiaolou. In 1963, after eight years of dedicated practice, Ji Qilin received a perfect score for his graduation performance, the first in school history.

Instead of becoming a star performer as everyone had predicted, Ji Qilin saw his dream dashed with the advent of the Cultural Revolution, which banned all traditional Chinese operas. In 1968, Ji Qilin was "sent down" to work in a salt mine in Tianjin. After an attempt to star in revolutionary operas proved unsuccessful, he decided to become a modern dancer. At that time, his newlywed wife Zhang Bailing (张百灵) was working as a stage actress for the Kunming Military Region (昆明军区) in Kunming, and Ji Qilin managed to join the army in Kunming to be with her. He was already 23 with no background in dancing. In order to take on non-extra roles, Ji Qilin had to work much harder than everyone else: he woke up one hour earlier and practiced until late in the evening. His dedication paid off: he was given main roles in the ballet Red Detachment of Women.

Just then the Cultural Revolution ended, and in 1978, Ji Qilin made another career change: he returned to Beijing to enroll in the China National Opera & Drama Dance Theatre so that he could star in dance dramas (舞剧), which sought to combine traditional art forms with western-imported modern dance. Again, Ji Qilin worked extremely hard and came to be recognized as one of the best dancers in China. However, by his late 30s he was increasingly battling back injuries. At that time, his young son Ji Chenmu acted in some films. Encouraged by Zhang Bailing, Ji Chenmu changed his career yet again: he followed his son and became a film and television actor.

== Filmography ==
=== Film ===
Year	English title	Original title	Role	Notes
1982	Sword	劍	Prince	Musical film
1983	The Legend of Sculptor Chang	泥人常傳奇	Qianlong Emperor	
1985	Kung Fu Hero Wang Wu	大刀王五	Tan Sitong	
1986	The White Dragon Sword	白龍劍	Du Baojie	
1987	Woman Demon Human	人鬼情	Teacher Zhang	
1988	Zhu De and Fan Shisheng	相遇貴相知	Fan Shisheng	TV film
1993	The Sword of Many Loves	飛狐外傳	Fuk'anggan	
1993	Kung Fu Cult Master	倚天屠龍記之魔教教主	Zhu Yuanzhang	
2009	The Price	买单	Zhou Houde	
2010	Shining Life	闪亮的青春	Shi Jianguo	
2010	The Dream of Mr. Lee	小人物狂想曲	Mr. Bai	
2011	Golden Chili Pepper	金椒	Zhao Qinian	
2013	Clock of God	天钟	Xia Xin	

=== TV and film series ===
Year	English title	Original title	Role	Notes
1985	Master Haideng	海燈法師	Hu Chun	
1985	Yue Fei	岳飛	Yue Fei	
1988	A Dream of Red Mansions	紅樓夢	Jia Lian	
1990	The Story of the Great Wall	长城故事	Qin Shi Huang	
1991	Sombre Night	夜深沉	Adjutant Li	
1992	Revolution in 1911	辛亥首義	Sun Yat-sen	
1994	Big Boss Cheng Changgeng	大老板程長庚	Cheng Changgeng	
1994	Mei Lanfang	梅兰芳	Feng Gengguang	
1995	This Life of Ours	今生今世	Ma Songnian	
1996	Shanghai Tango	上海探戈	He's father	
1996	New Dragon Gate Inn	新龍門客棧	Dorgon	
1997	Swallow Li San	燕子李三	Li Xian	
1999	Red Crag	紅岩	Liu Erge	
2000	Bleeding Love and Revenge	碧血情仇		
2000	The Great Emperor Guangwu	光武大帝	Cen Peng	
2002	Ode to Gallantry	俠客行	Shi Qing	
2003	The Heaven Sword and Dragon Saber	倚天屠龍記	Yin Tianzheng	
2003	Lady Wu: The First Empress	至尊紅顏	Li Yuanji	
2003	Bandits of Guanzhong	關中匪事	Xu Yunqing	
2003	Birthday Celebration by Five Daughters	新五女拜壽	Liang Chaochen	
2004	Genius Physician	神醫俠侶	Liu Yuan	
2004	So It Is You	原來就是你	Du Zhen	
2004	Wudang	武當	Qiu Chuji	
2004	Miracle	奇迹	Zhang Jie	
2005	Strange Tales of Liao Zhai	聊齋志異	Wang Pupin	
2005	Wind and Cloud 2	風雲2	Qin Shi Huang	
2005	Happy 7 Fairies	歡天喜地七仙女	Bare-foot Immortal	
2007	Sword Stained with Royal Blood	碧血劍	Taoist Musang	
2007	The Gold Convoyers	鏢行天下	Shen Rong	
2007	Special Mission 2	特殊使命2：亂世女兒紅		
2007	Roaming the World with a Sword	劍行天下	Yang Tianpeng	
2008	Tiger Mountain	虎山行	Li Qingtian	
2008	Taiwan 1895	台灣·一八九五	Prince Gong	
2008	The Legend of the Condor Heroes	射鵰英雄傳	Wang Chongyang	
2009	Look at Flower in Fog	雾里看花	Mr. Ge	
2009	A Beautiful Daughter-in-law Era	媳妇的美好时代	Yu Hongshui	
2011	We Are Family	我们是一家人	Zhao Pengfei	
2011	Get Married at 30	三十而嫁	Yu Yuanzhi	
2012	Mother-in-Law's Happy Life	岳母的幸福生活	Zhao Baofu	
2012	Secret Battle in Emei	密戰峨嵋	Dong Ji	
2013	When Tianzhen Meets Xianshi	天真遇到现实	Yang Tianzhen's father	
2013	The Third Kind of Happiness	第三种幸福	Ren Huanting	
2015	Wind, Flowers, Snow, and Moon	风花雪月		
2015	Happiness Returns	幸福归来		
2015	Mum Go Go Go	妈妈向前冲	Yin's father	
2016	Not Easy to Raise a Child	养个孩子不容易		
