= Dungan people =

Hui subgroup in Central Asia

Хуэйзў (回族) 東干族
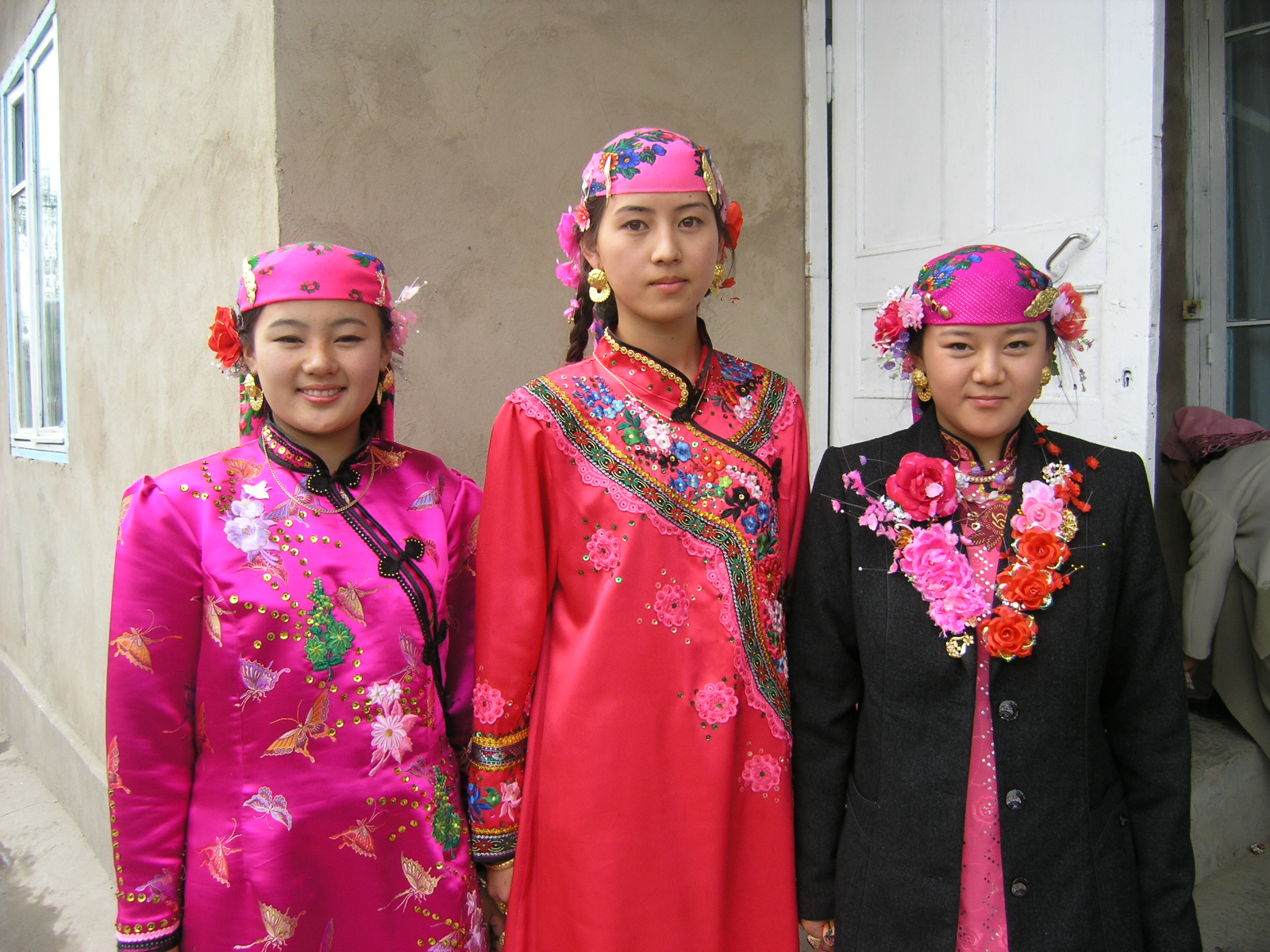
- Dungan women posing for a photoshoot in traditional Dungan clothing in Sortobe, Kazakhstan (2004)

Total population
- 175,782

Regions with significant populations
- Kyrgyzstan (2021 census): 76,573
- Kazakhstan (2019 census): 74,409
- Russia (2021 census): 3,028
- ∟ Altai Krai: 207 (2010)
- ∟ Penza Oblast: 53 (2010)
- ∟ Moscow: 43 (2010)
- ∟ Saint Petersburg: 500 (2018)
- ∟ Lipetsk Oblast: 41 (2010)
- ∟ Saratov Oblast: 760 (2010)
- Ukraine: 133

Languages
- Dungan or Central Plains Mandarin; Secondary languages: Russian; Kazakh; Kyrgyz

Religion
- Predominantly Sunni Islam

Related ethnic groups
- Other Sinitic peoples; (Bai, Han Chinese, Hui, Taz)

Dungan (Note: Dungan: Хуэйзў (回族), romanized: Huizu, Xiao'erjing: حُوِ ظُ; simplified Chinese: 东干族; traditional Chinese: 東干族; pinyin: Dōnggān zú, [tʊ́ŋkán tsǔ], Xiao'erjing: دْوقًا ظُ; Russian: Дунгане; Kyrgyz: Дуңгандар, romanized: Duñgandar, arabized: دۇنغاندار; Kazakh: Дүңгендер, romanized: Düñgender, arabized: دٷڭگەندەر) is a term used in territories of the former Soviet Union to refer to a group of Muslims of Hui origin. Turkic-speaking peoples in Xinjiang also sometimes refer to Hui Muslims as Dungans. The Dungans in Central Asia, however, refer themselves by their endonym Hui (Dungan: Хуэй).

In the censuses of the countries of the former Soviet Union, the Dungans (enumerated separately from Chinese) are found in Kazakhstan (36,900 according to the 1999 census), Kyrgyzstan (58,409 according to the 2009 census) and Russia (801 according to the 2002 census).

== History ==
=== Migration from China ===
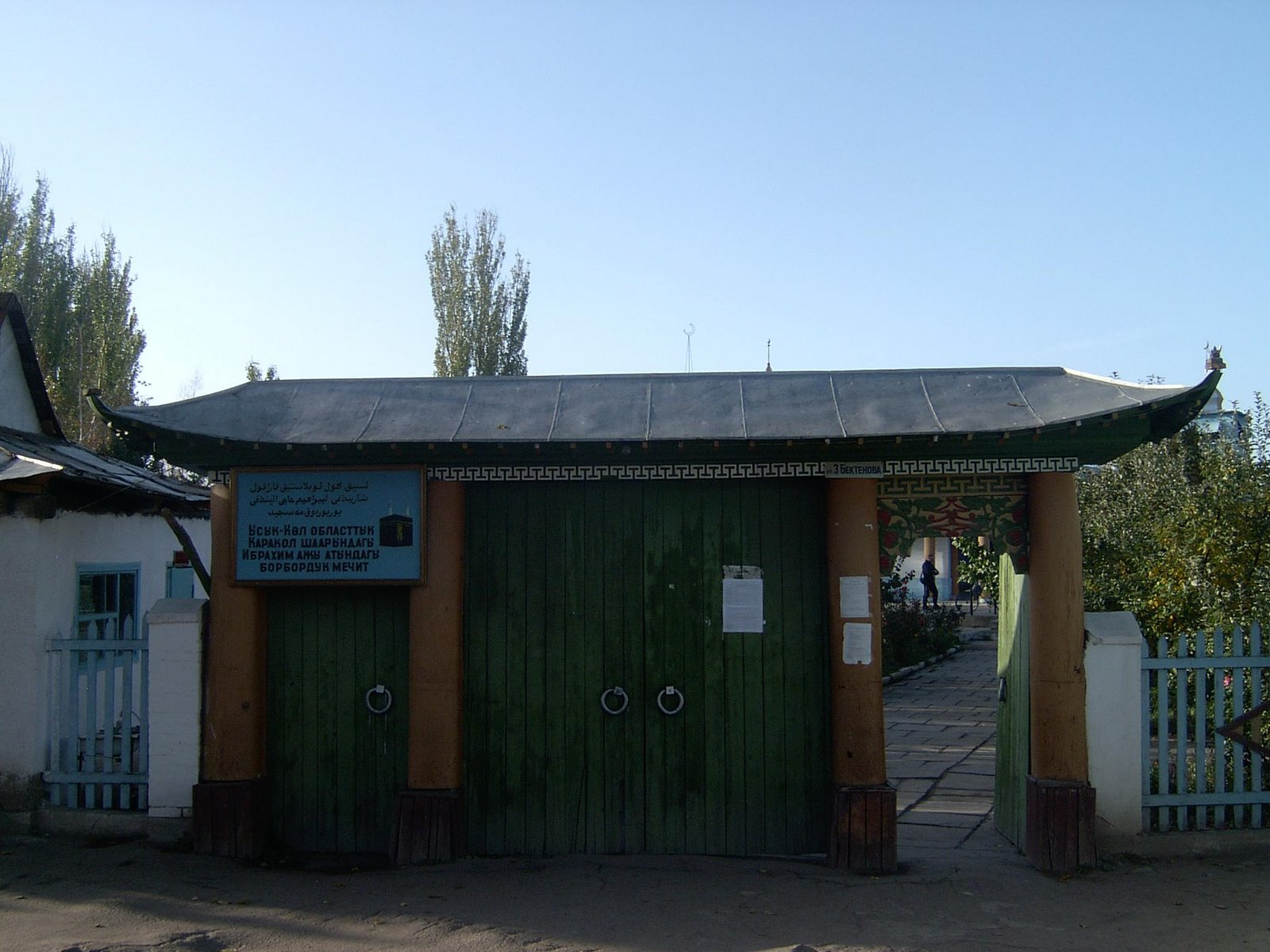
The gate of the Dungan mosque in Karakol, Kyrgyzstan. The upper text on the sign is a partially Uyghurized rendering of the mosque's Kyrgyz name into the Uyghur Arabic alphabet: Isiq-köl oblasttiq Qaraqol sharindaghi Ibrahim Haji atindaghi borborduq mäsjid. The lower text is Kyrgyz in the Cyrillic script: Ysyk-Köl oblasttyk Karakol shaaryndagy Ibrakhim Ajy atyndagy borborduk mechit—Central Mosque in the name of Ibrahim Hajji in the city of Karakol, an oblast of Ysyk-Köl.

Turkic Muslim slave-raiders from Khoqand did not distinguish between Hui Muslim and Han Chinese, enslaving Hui Muslims in violation of Islamic law. During the Afaqi Khoja revolts Turkic Muslim Khoja Jahangir Khoja led an invasion of Kashgar from the Kokand Khanate and Jahangir's forces captured several hundred Dungan Chinese Muslims (Tungan or Hui) who were taken to Kokand. Tajiks bought two Chinese slaves from Shaanxi; they were enslaved for a year before being returned by the Tajik Beg Ku-bu-te to China. All Dungans captured, both merchants and the 300 soldiers Janhangir captured in Kashgar, had their queues cut off when brought to Kokand and Central Asia as prisoners. Many of the captives became slaves. Accounts of these slaves in Central Asia increased. The queues were removed from Dungan Chinese Muslim prisoners and then sold or given away. Some of them escaped to Russian territory where they were repatriated back to China and the accounts of their captures were recorded in Chinese records. The Russians record an incident where they rescued these Chinese Muslim merchants who escaped, after they were sold by Jahangir's Army in Central Asia and sent them back to China.

The Dungan in the former Soviet republics are Hui who fled China in the aftermath of the Hui Minorities' War (also known as the "Dungan Rebellion") in the 19th century. According to Rimsky-Korsakoff (1992), three separate groups of the Hui people fled to the Russian Empire across the Tian Shan mountains during the exceptionally severe winter of 1877/78 after the end of the Hui Minorities' War:

1. The first group, of some 1000 people, originally from Turpan in Xinjiang, led by Ma Daren (馬大人, 'the Great Man Ma'), also known as Ma Da-lao-ye (馬大老爺, 'the Great Master Ma'), reached Osh in Southern Kyrgyzstan.
2. The second group, originally from Didaozhou (狄道州) in Gansu, led by ahong Ma Yusuf (馬郁素夫), also known as Ah Ye Laoren (阿爺老人, 'the Old Man O'Granpa'), were settled in the spring of 1878 in the village of Yrdyk (Russian: Ирдык or Ырдык) some 15 km from Karakol in Eastern Kyrgyzstan. They numbered 1130 on arrival.
3. The third group, originally from Shaanxi, led by Bai Yanhu (白彦虎; also spelt Bo Yanhu; often called by his followers "虎大人", 'The Great Man Hu (Tiger)', 1829(?)-1882), one of the leaders of the rebellion, were settled in the village of Karakunuz (now Masanchi), in modern Zhambyl Province of Kazakhstan. This group numbered 3314 on arrival. Bai Yanhu's name in other romanizations was Bo-yan-hu or Pai Yen-hu; other names included Boyan-akhun (Akhund or Imam Boyan) and Muhammad Ayyub.

The next wave of immigration followed in the early 1880s. In accordance with the terms of the Treaty of Saint Petersburg (1881), which required the withdrawal of the Russian troops from the Upper Ili basin (the Kulja area), the Dungan (Hui) and Taranchi (Uyghur) people of the region were allowed to opt to move to the Russian side of the border. Many chose to do so; according to Russian statistics, 4,682 Hui moved to the Russian Empire under the terms of the treaty. They migrated in many small groups between 1881 and 1883, settling in the village of Sokuluk some 30 km west of Bishkek, as well as in a number of locations between the Chinese border and Sokuluk, in southeastern Kazakhstan and in northern Kyrgyzstan.

=== Name ===
Dungan people

Chinese name
- Traditional Chinese: 東干族
- Simplified Chinese: 东干族
Transcriptions
Standard Mandarin
- Hanyu Pinyin: Dōnggānzú
Yue: Cantonese
- Jyutping: dung1 gon1 zuk6

Dunganese name
- Dungan: Хуэйзў; Дунганзў
- Xiao'erjing: حُوِ ذَو
- Romanization: Huejzw
- Hanzi: 回族

Russian name
- Russian: Дунгане

In the Russian Empire, Soviet Union, and the post-Soviet states, the Dungans continue to refer to themselves as the Hui people (Chinese: 回族, Huízú; in Cyrillic Soviet Dungan spelling, xуэйзў).

The name Dungan is of obscure origin. One popular theory derives this word from Turkic döñän ("one who turns"), which can be compared to Chinese 回 (huí), which has a similar meaning. Another theory derives it from 'Eastern Gansu' (東甘, donggan), the region to which many of the Dungan can trace their ancestry; however the character gan (干) used in the name of the ethnic group is different from that used in the name of the province (甘).

The term "Dungan" ("Tonggan", "Donggan") has been used by Central Asian Turkic-and Tajik-speaking people to refer to Chinese-speaking Muslims for several centuries. Joseph Fletcher cites Turkic and Persian manuscripts related to the preaching of the 17th century Kashgarian Sufi master Muhammad Yūsuf (or, possibly, his son Afaq Khoja) inside the Ming Empire (in today's Gansu and/or Qinghai), where the Kashgarian preacher is told to have converted 'ulamā-yi Tunganiyyān (i.e., "Dungan ulema") into Sufism.

Presumably, it was from the Turkic languages that the term was borrowed into Russian (дунгане, dungane (pl.); дунганин, dunganin (sing.)) and Chinese (simplified Chinese: 东干族; traditional Chinese: 東干族; pinyin: Dōnggānzú), as well as to Western European languages.

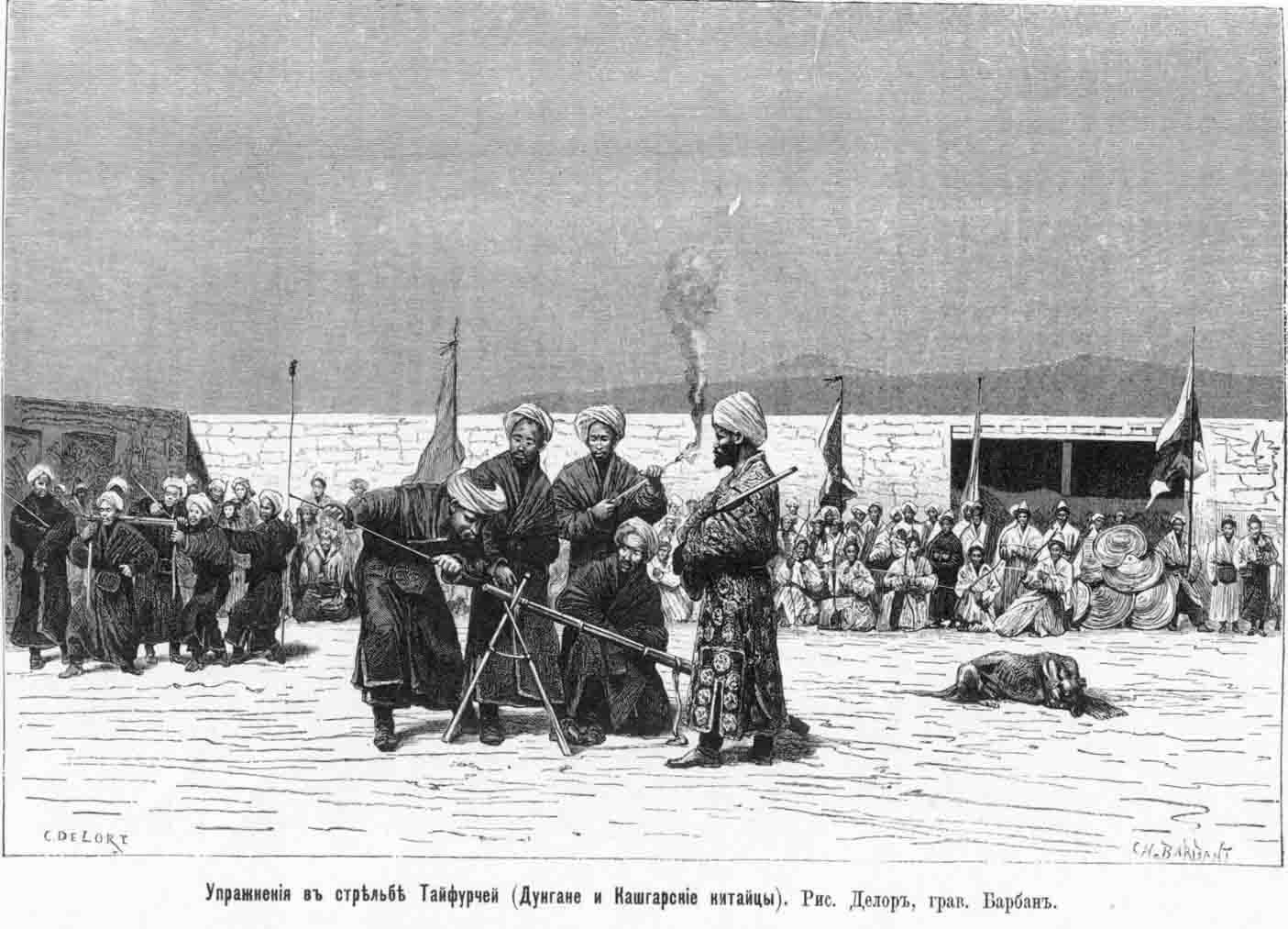
Caption: "Shooting exercises of taifurchi [gunners]. Dungans and Kashgar Chinese". A French engraving from the Yaqub Beg's state period

In English and German, the ethnonym "Dungan", in various spellings, has been attested as early as the 1830s, typically referring to the Hui people of Xinjiang. For example, James Prinsep in 1835 mentioned Muslim "Túngánis" in "Chinese Tartary". In 1839, Karl Ernst von Baer in his German-language account of Russian Empire and adjacent Asian lands has a one-page account of Chinese-speaking Muslim "Dungani" or "Tungani", who visited Orenburg in 1827 with a caravan from China; he also mentions "Tugean" as a spelling variant used by other authors. R.M. Martin in 1847 mentions "Tungani" merchants in Yarkand.

The word (mostly in the form "Dungani" or "Tungani", sometimes "Dungens" or "Dungans") acquired some currency in English and other western languages when a number of books in the 1860-1870s discussed the Dungan rebellion in northwestern China. At the time, European and American authors applied the term Tungani to the Hui people both in Xinjiang, and in Shaanxi and Gansu (which at the time included today's Ningxia and Qinghai as well). Authors aware of the general picture of the spread of Islam in China, viewed these "Tungani" as just one of the groups of China's Muslims.

Marshall Broomhall, who has a chapter on "the Tungan Rebellion" in his 1910 book, introduces "the name Tungan or Dungan, by which the Muslims of these parts [i.e., NE China] are designated, as distinguished from the Chinese Buddhists who were spoken of as Kithay." The reference to "Kithay" shows that he was observing the two terms as used by Turkic speakers. Broomhall's book also contains a translation of the report on Chinese Muslims by the Ottoman writer named Abd-ul-Aziz. Abd-ul-Aziz divides the "Tungan people" into two branches: "the Tunagans of China proper" (including, apparently all Hui people in "China proper", as he also talks e.g. about the Tungans having 17 mosques in Beijing), and "The Tungans of Chinese and Russian Turkestan", who still looked and spoke Chinese, but had often also learned the "Turkish" language.

Later authors continued to use the term Dungan (in various transcriptions) for, specifically, the Hui people of Xinjiang. For example, Owen Lattimore, writing c. 1940, maintains the terminological distinction between these two related groups: "T'ungkan" (i.e. Wade-Giles for "Dungan"), described by him as the descendants of the Gansu Hui people resettled in Xinjiang in the 17th–18th centuries, vs. e.g. "Gansu Moslems" or generic "Chinese Moslems". The term (usually as "Tungans") continues to be used by many modern historians writing about the 19th century Dungan Rebellion (e.g., by Denis C. Twitchett in The Cambridge History of China, by James A. Millward in his economic history of the region, or by Kim Ho-dong in his monograph).

=== Dungan villages in Kazakhstan and Kyrgyzstan ===
The Dungans themselves referred to Karakunuz (Russian: Каракунуз, sometimes Караконыз or Караконуз) as "Ingpan" (Chinese: 營盤, Yingpan; Russian: Иньпан), which means 'a camp, an encampment'. In 1965, Karakunuz was renamed Masanchi (sometimes spelt as "Masanchin"), after Magaza Masanchi or Masanchin (Dungan: Магәзы Масанчын; Chinese: 馬三奇), a Dungan participant in the Communist Revolution and a statesman of Soviet Kazakhstan.

The following table summarizes the location of Dungan villages in Kazakhstan and Kyrgyzstan, alternative names used for them, and their Dungan population as reported by Ma Tong (2003). The Cyrillic Dungan spelling of place names is as in the textbook by Sushanlo, Imazov (1988); the spelling of the name in Chinese characters is as in Ma Tong (2003).

Dungan villages in Kazakhstan and Kyrgyzstan
Village name (and alternatives)	Location (in present-day terms)	Foundation	Current Dungan population (from Ma Tang (2003))
Kazakhstan – total 48,000 (Ma Tang (2003)) or 36,900 (Kazakhstan Census of 1999)
Masanchi (Russian: Масанчи; Kazakh: Масаншы) or Masanchin (Russian: Масанчин; Cyrillic Dungan: Масанчын; 馬三成), prior to 1965 Karakunuz (Каракунуз, Караконыз). Traditional Dungan name is Ingpan (Cyrillic Dungan: Йинпан; Russian: Иньпан; Chinese: 營盤, Yingpan)	(42°55′40″N 75°18′00″E) Korday District, Jambyl Region of Kazakhstan (8 km north of Tokmok, Kyrgyzstan)	Spring 1878. 3314 people from Shaanxi, led by Bai Yanhu (白彦虎).	7,000, current mayor: Iskhar Yusupovich Lou
Sortobe (Kazakh: Sortobe; Russian: Шортюбе, Shortyube; Dungan: Щёртюбе; Chinese: 新渠, Xinqu)	(42°52′00″N 75°15′15″E) Korday District, Jambyl Region. On the northern bank of the river Chu opposite and a few km downstream from Tokmok; south of Masanchi (Karakunuz)	(Karakunuz group)	9,000
Zhalpak-tobe, (Kazakh: Жалпак-тобе; Chinese: 加爾帕克秋白, Jiaerpakeqiubai)	Jambyl District, Jambyl Region; near Grodekovo, south of Taraz		3,000
Kyrgyzstan – total 50,000 (Ma Tang (2003)
Yrdyk (Kyrgyz: Ырдык; Dungan: Эрдэх; Chinese: 二道溝, Erdaogou)	(42°27′30″N 78°18′0″E) Jeti-Ögüz District of Issyk-Kul Region; 15 km south-west from Karakol.	Spring 1878. 1130 people, originally from Didaozhou (狄道州) in Gansu, led by Ma Yusu (馬郁素), a.k.a. Ah Yelaoren (阿爺老人).	2,800
Sokuluk (Kyrgyz: Сокулук; Dungan: Сохўлў; Chinese: 梢葫蘆, Saohulu); may also include adjacent Aleksandrovka (Александровка)	Sokuluk District of Chüy Region; 30 km west of Bishkek	Some of those 4,628 Hui people who arrived in 1881–1883 from the Ili Basin (Xinjiang) .	12,000
Milyanfan (Kyrgyz: Милянфан; Dungan: Милёнчуан; Chinese: 米糧川, Miliangchuan)	Ysyk-Ata District of Chüy Region. Southern bank of the Chu River, some 60 km west of Tokmok and about as much north-east of Bishkek.	(Karakunuz group (?))	10,000
Ivanovka village (Kyrgyz: Ивановка; Chinese: 伊萬諾夫卡)	Ysyk-Ata District of Chüy Region. Southern bank of the Chu River, some 30 km west of Tokmok.	(Karakunuz group (?))	1,500
Dungan community of Osh (Kyrgyz: Ош; Chinese: 奥什 or 敖什, Aoshe)	Osh Region	Spring 1878, 1000 people, originally from Turpan in Xinjiang, led by Ma Daren, also known as Ma Da-lao-ye (馬大老爺)	800

The position of the Kazakhstan villages within the administrative division of Jambyl Region, and the total population of each village can be found at the provincial statistics office web site.

Besides the traditionally Dungan villages, many Dungan people live in the nearby cities, such as Bishkek, Tokmok, Karakol.

=== Soviet rule ===
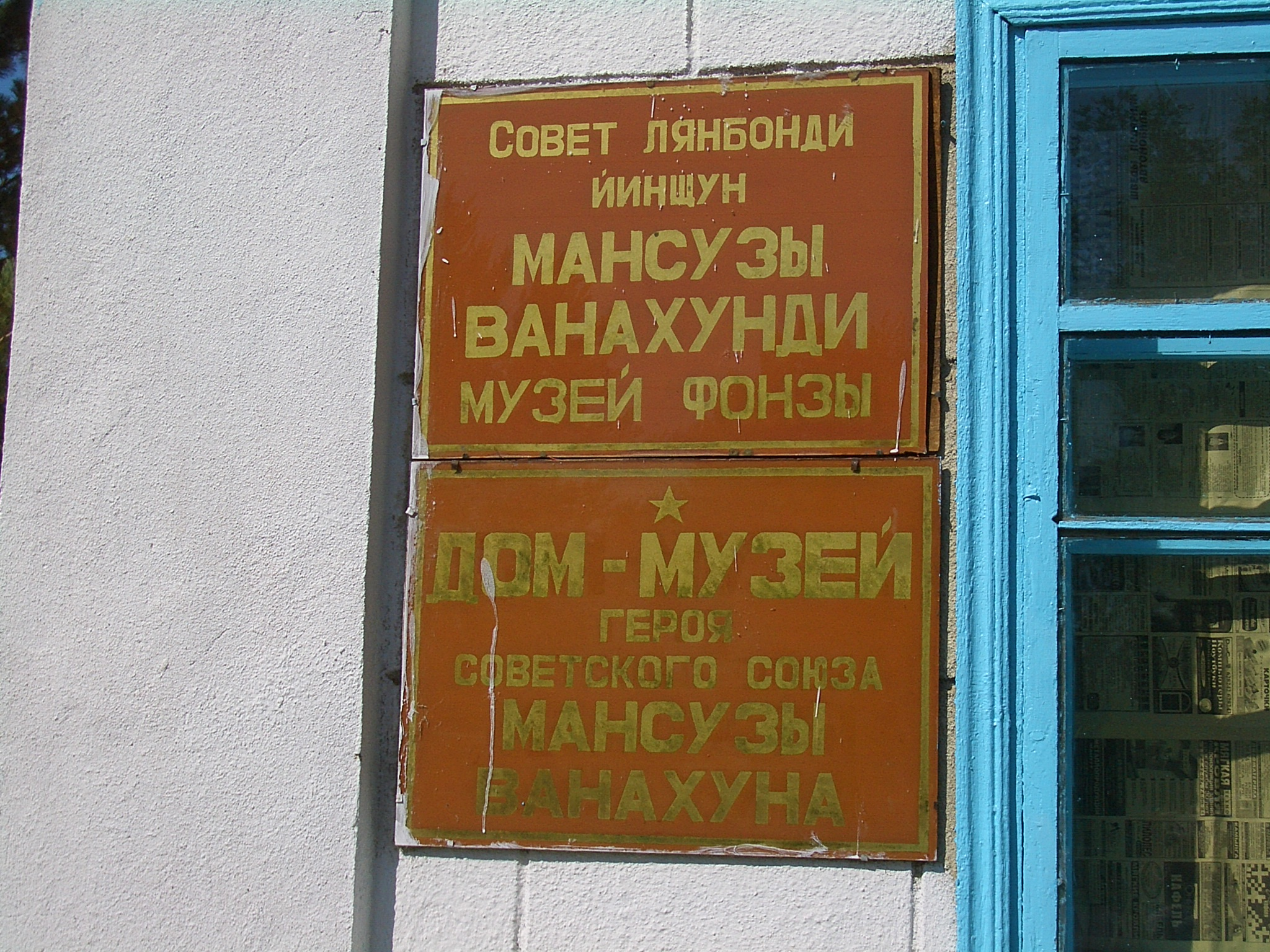
Vanakhun's museum

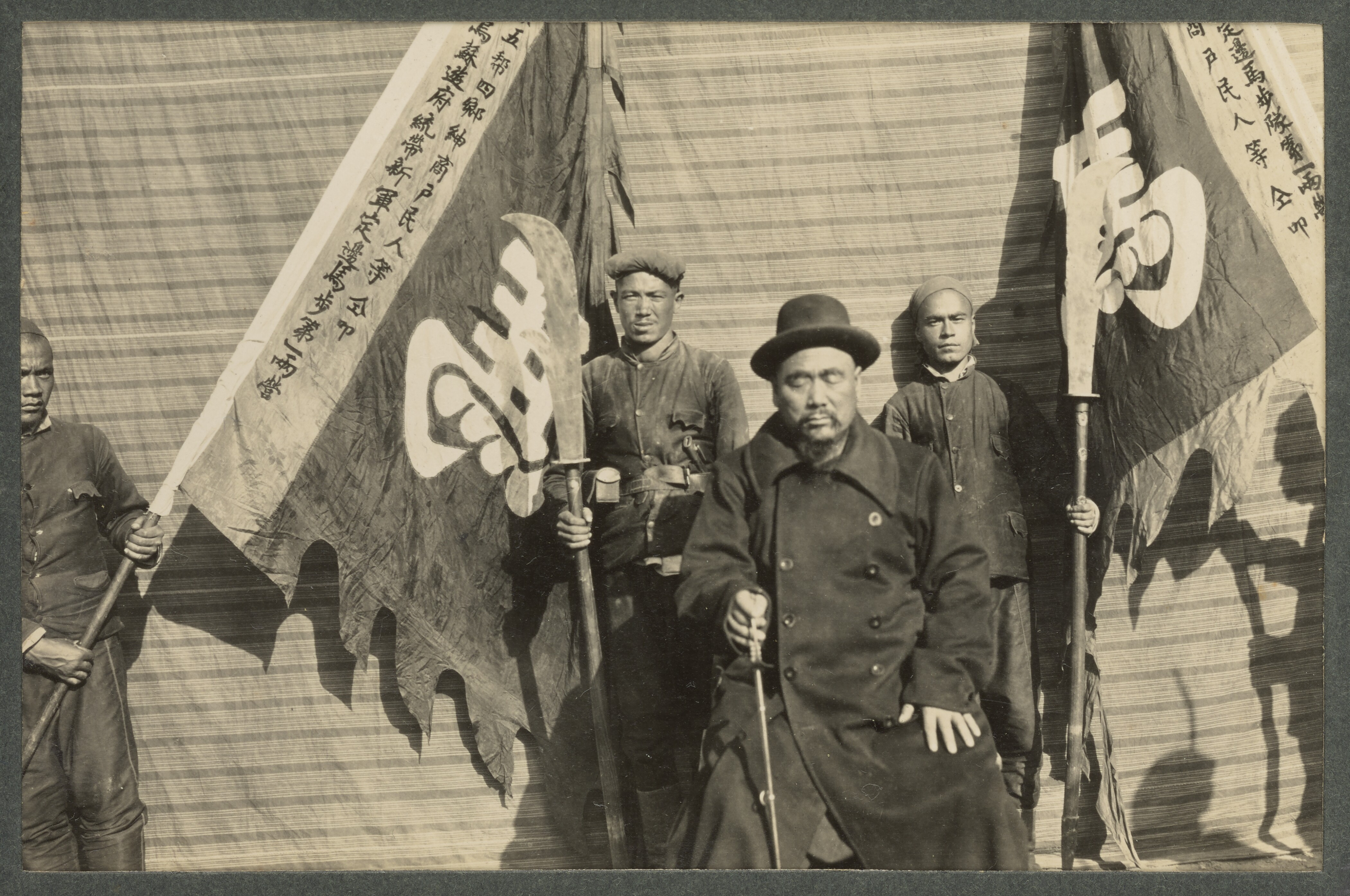
Tungan generals of Tunganistan, in Hotan.

During World War II, some Dungans served in the Red Army, one of them who was Vanakhun Mansuza (Cyrillic Dungan: мансуза ванахун; traditional Chinese: 曼苏茲(or子)·王阿洪; simplified Chinese: 曼蘇茲·王阿洪; pinyin: Mànsūzī·Wángāhóng) a Dungan war "hero" who led a "mortar battery".

Reportedly, Dungans were "strongly anti-Japanese". During the 1930s, a White Russian driver for Nazi German agent Georg Vasel in Xinjiang was afraid to meet Hui general Ma Zhongying, saying: "You know how the Tungans hate the Russians." Vasel passed the Russian driver off as a German.

=== Present day ===
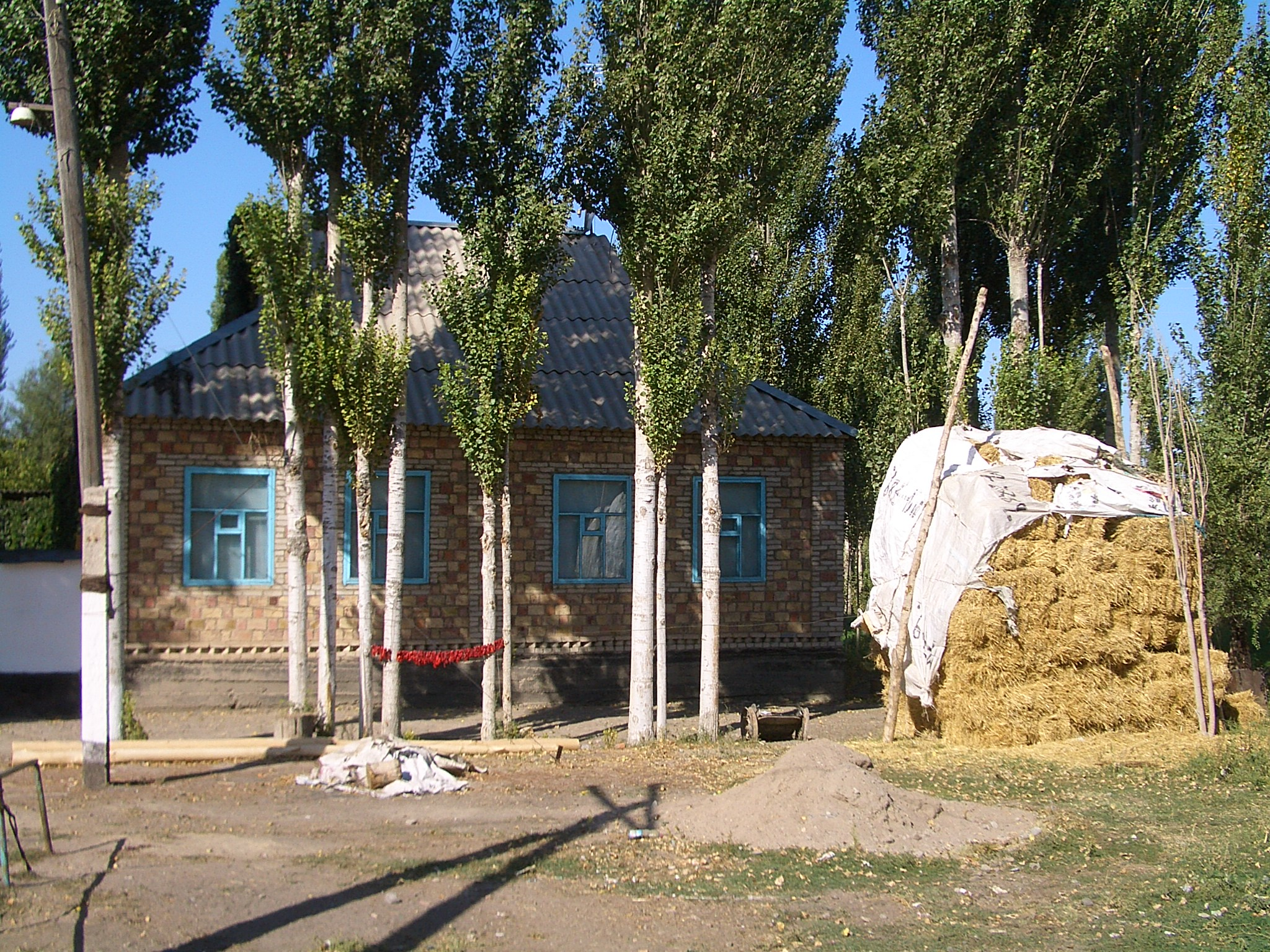
In Milyanfan village, Chüy Region of Kyrgyzstan

As Ding (2005) notes, "[t]he Dungan people derive from China's Hui people, and now live mainly in Kyrgyzstan and Kazakhstan. Their population is about 110,000. This people have now developed a separate ethnicity outside China, yet they have close relations with the Hui people in culture, ethnic characteristics and ethnic identity." Today the Dungans play a role as cultural "shuttles" and economic mediators between Central Asia and the Chinese world. Husei Daurov, the president of the Dungan center, has succeeded in transforming cultural exchanges into commercial partnerships.

In February 2020, a conflict broke out between ethnic Kazakhs and Dungans in the Korday area in Kazakhstan, near the border with Kyrgyzstan. According to official Kazakh sources, 10 people were killed and many more were wounded. In the altercation, cars and homes were burned and rifles were fired. 600 people fled across the border to Kyrgyzstan.

== Language ==
The Dungan language, which the Dungan people call the "Hui language", is similar to the Zhongyuan dialect of Mandarin Chinese, which is widely spoken in the south of Gansu and the west of Guanzhong in Shaanxi in China.

Like other varieties of Chinese, Dungan is tonal. There are two main dialects, one with four tones and the other, considered standard, with three tones in the final position in words and four tones in the non-final position.

Dungan preserves archaic Qing-era vocabulary. Their language also contains many loanwords from Russian, Arabic, Persian and Turkic. Dungan is uniquely written using the Cyrillic script.

Dungan people are generally multilingual. In addition to Dungan Chinese, more than two-thirds of the Dungan speak Russian and a small proportion can speak Kyrgyz or other languages belonging to the titular nationalities of the countries where they live.

== Culture ==
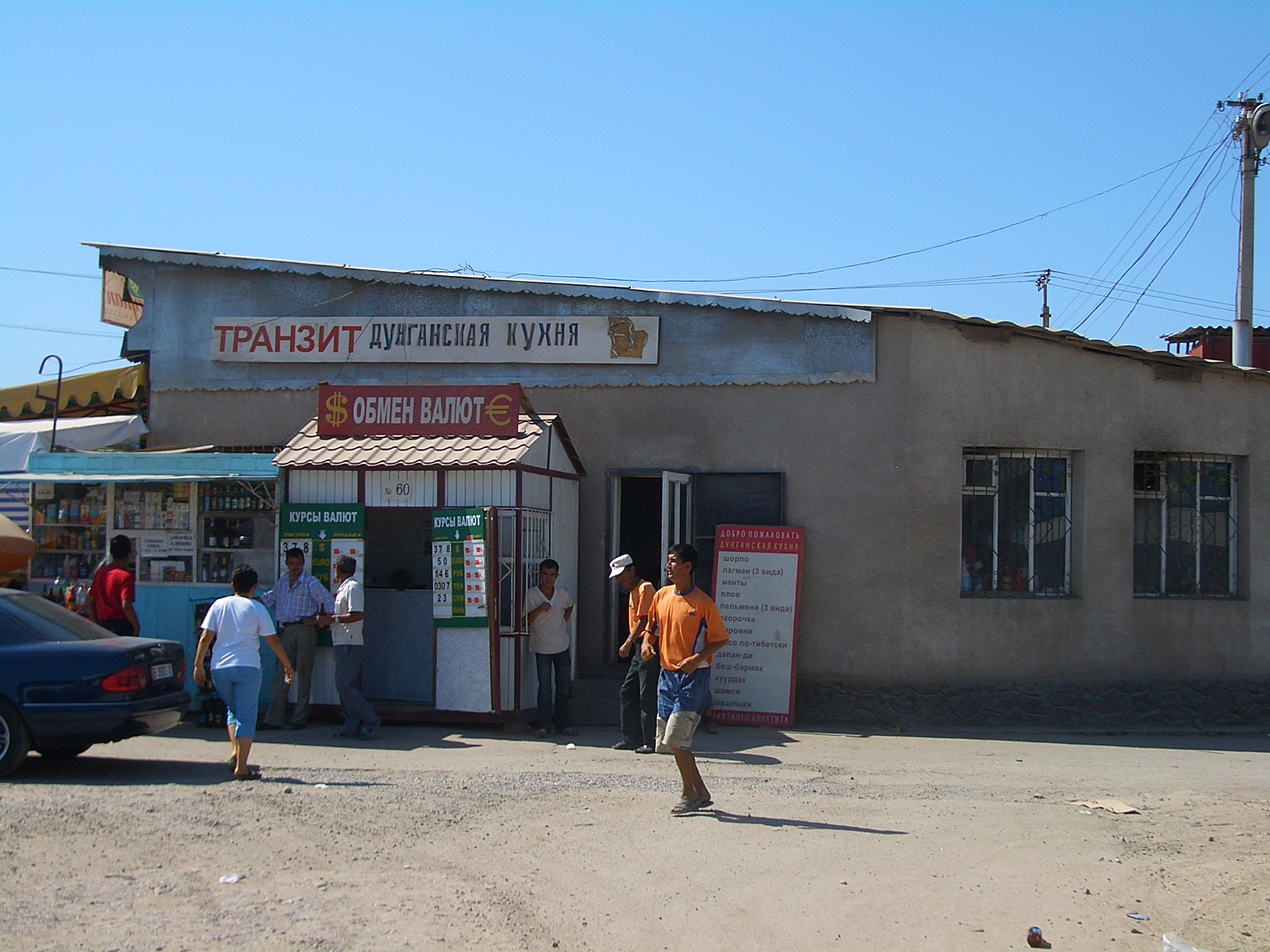
Many restaurants in Bishkek advertise "Dungan cuisine" (Дунганская кухня)

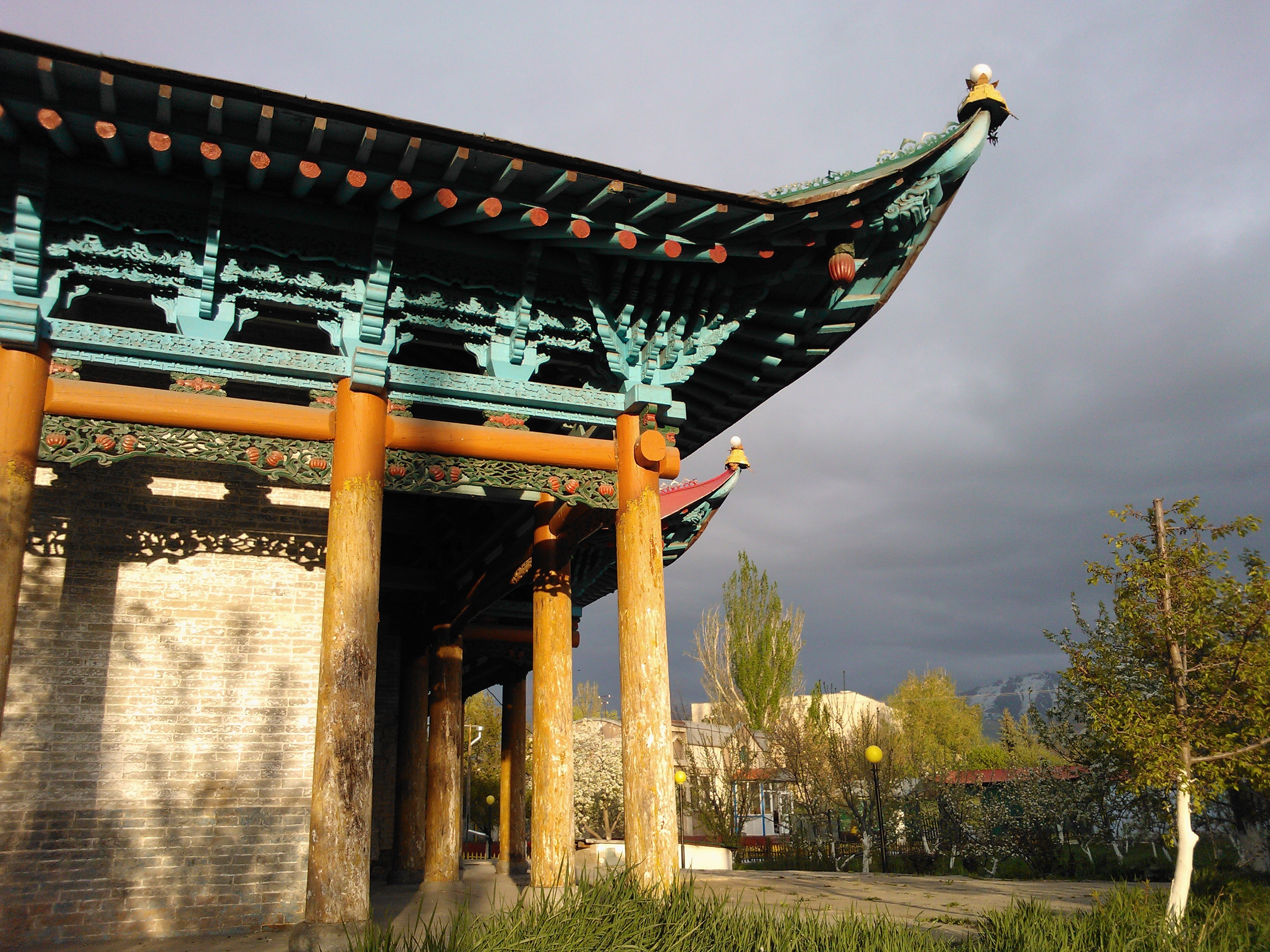
Dungan mosque in Karakol, Kyrgyzstan

Nineteenth century explorer Henry Lansdell noted that the Dungan people abstained from spirits and opium, neither smoked nor took snuff and

"are of middle height, and inclined to be stout. They have high and prominent foreheads, thick and arched eyebrows, eyes rather sunken, fairly prominent cheek-bones, an oval face, a mouth of average size, thick lips, normal teeth, a round chin, small and compressed ears, black and smooth hair, a scanty and rough beard, smooth skin, a strong neck, and extremities of average proportions. The characteristics of the Dungans are kindness, industry, and hospitality.

They engage in husbandry, horticulture, and trade. In domestic life, parental authority is very strong. After the birth of a child, the mother does not get up for fifteen days, and, without any particular feast, the child receives its name in the presence of a mullah the day succeeding that of its birth. Circumcision takes place on the eighth, ninth, or tenth day. When a girl is married she receives a dower. In sickness, they have recourse to medicine and doctors, but never to exorcisms.

After death, the mullah and the aged assemble to recite prayers; the corpse is wrapped in white linen and then buried, but never burned. On returning from the interment the mullah and the elders partake of bread and meat. To saints they erect monuments like little mosques, for others simple hillocks. The widow may re-marry after 90 days, and on the third anniversary of the death a feast takes place."

The Dungan still practice elements of Chinese culture, in cuisine and attire, up to 1948 they also practiced foot binding until the practice was banned by the Soviet government, and later the Chinese government. The conservative Shaanxi Dungan cling more tightly to Chinese customs than the Gansu Dungan.

The Dungans have retained Chinese traditions that have disappeared in modern China. Traditional marriage practices are still widespread with matchmakers, the marriages conducted by the Dungan are similar to Chinese marriages in the 19th century, hairstyles worn by women and attire date back to the Qing dynasty.

Shaanxi female attire is still Chinese, though the rest of the Dungans dress in Western attire. Chopsticks are used by Dungans. The cuisine of the Dungan resembles northwestern Chinese cuisine. However, being Muslims, they do not consume pork, one of the most popular meats in Chinese cuisine, and meat is procured in accordance with being halal.

Around the late 19th century, the bride price was between 240 and 400 rubles for Dungan women. Dungans have been known to take other women such as Kirghiz and Tatars, as brides willingly or kidnap Kirghiz girls. Shaanxi Dungans are even conservative when marrying with other Dungans; they want only other Shaanxi Dungans marrying their daughters, while their sons are allowed to marry Gansu Dungan, Kirghiz, and Kazakh women. As recently as 1962, inter-ethnic marriage was reported to be anathema among Dungans.

== Identity ==
During the Qing dynasty, the term Zhongyuanren (中原人; 'A person from the Central Plains of China') was synonymous with being mainstream Chinese, especially referring to Han Chinese and Hui Muslims in Xinjiang or Central Asia.

For religious reasons, while Hui people do not consider themselves Han and are not Han Chinese, they consider themselves part of the wider Chinese race and refer to themselves as Zhongyuanren. The Dungan people, descendants of Hui who fled to Central Asia, called themselves Zhongyuanren in addition to the standard labels Lao Huihui and Huizi.

Zhongyuanren was used generally by Turkic Muslims to refer to Han and Hui Chinese people. When Central Asian invaders from Kokand invaded Kashgar, in a letter the Kokandi commander criticizes the Kashgari Turkic Muslim Ishaq for allegedly not behaving like a Turkic-origin Muslim and wanting to be a Zhongyuanren.

== See also ==
- Dungan revolt (1862–1877), rebellion of various Muslim ethnic groups in Shaanxi and Gansu, China
- Dungan revolt (1895–1896), rebellion of various Muslim ethnic groups in Qinghai and Gansu, China
- Tunganistan
