= Korday District =

District of Jambyl Region, Kazakhstan

Korday District: Қордай ауданы; Qordai audany
- District
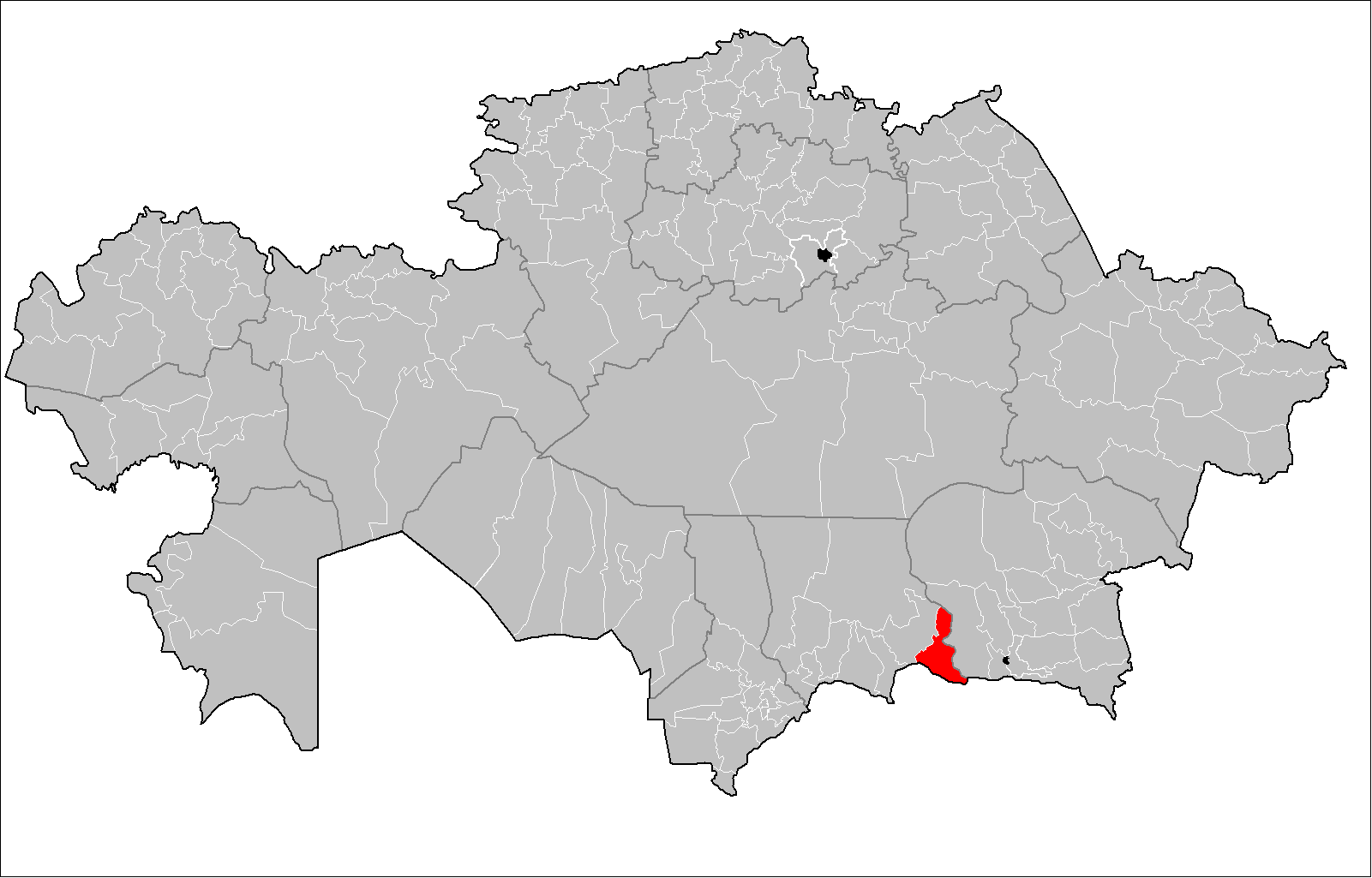
- Location of Korday District in Kazakhstan
- Coordinates: 43°19′48″N 75°04′12″E
- Country: Kazakhstan
- Region: Jambyl Region
- Administrative center: Korday

Government
  - Akim: Begzat Bolatbekov

Area
  - Land: 9,000 km^{2} (3,500 sq mi)

Population (2021)
  - Total: 156,270
  - Density: 17/km^{2} (45/sq mi)

Korday District (Kazakh: Қордай ауданы, Qordai audany) is a district of Jambyl Region in southeastern Kazakhstan. Its administrative centre is the village of Korday. The population was 156,270 as of the 2021 national census. Dungans (Hui Chinese) form a significant ethnic minority in the district.

== History ==
The area was part of Almaty District from 1928 until it was incorporated into Jambyl Region in 1939.

Ethnic riots between Kazakhs and Dungans broke out across Korday District in early February 2022. Authorities attributed the violence to misinformation that had been spread about fights that occurred on 5 and 7 February, and estimated that up to 1,000 people had participated in the riots from 7 to 10 February.

Four public employees in the district akimat (district government), including the akim (district head), were convicted on 20 December 2022 for embezzling 26 million Kazakhstani tenge that had been allocated to support vulnerable groups during the COVID-19 pandemic in Kazakhstan. Begzat Seisenkulovich Bolatbekov was appointed as the new akim the same day.

== Administration and geography ==
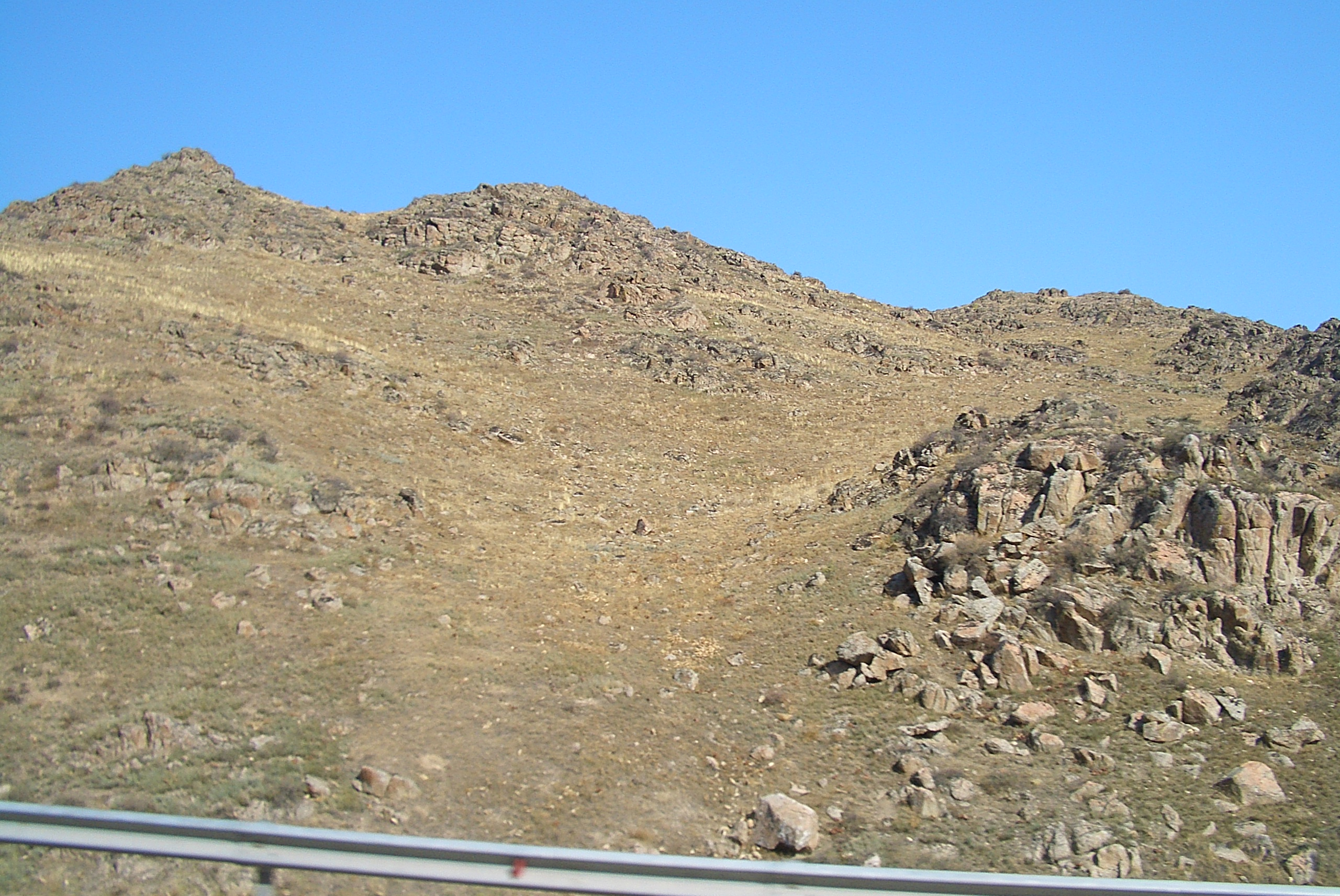
Hills of the Chu-Ili Range in Korday District

Korday District is located in the southeastern corner of Jambyl Region, in the southeast of Kazakhstan. It is further subdivided into 18 rural subdistricts. The village of Korday is the administrative center.

The district spans an area of roughly 9,000 square kilometres and has mostly mountainous terrain. The Chu-Ili Range covers the north and east, while smaller mountain ranges are located in the south and west.

== Demographics ==
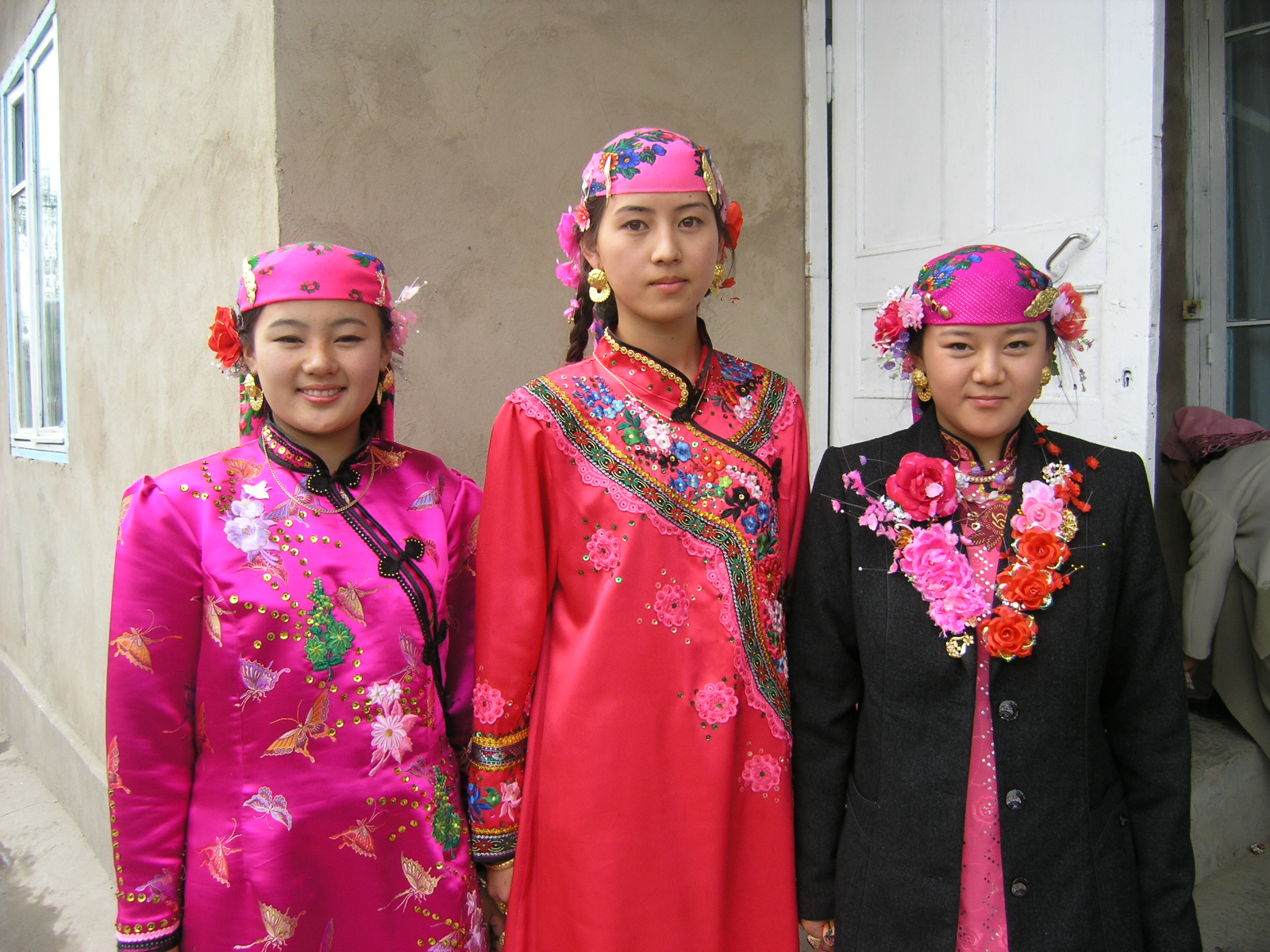
Dungan girls in traditional attire in Sortobe, 2004

The 2021 Kazakhstani census recorded a population of 156,270 in Korday District. Kazakhs constitute the main ethnic group, but there are significant populations of Russians, Uzbeks, and Dungans as well.

There are 41 settlements in the district, the three largest of which are Korday (the capital), Sortobe, and Masanchi.

== Economy ==
The national agricultural and mineral industries play significant roles in the local economy. A total of 234,000 hectares of land are used for agriculture. Minerals and rocks mined in the district include fluorite, granite, limestone, molybdenum, and sandstone.

== Services ==
As of 2003 there was 1 college, 48 secondary schools, 38 libraries, 28 cultural centres, 2 museums, and 4 district hospitals or clinics.
