= Sortobe =

Sortobe Сортөбе Sortöbe
- Interactive map of Sortobe
- Location within Kazakhstan
- Coordinates: 42°51′36″N 75°13′48″E
- Country: Kazakhstan
- Region: Jambyl Region
- District: Korday District
- Elevation: 768 m (2,520 ft)

Population (2015)
  - Total: 29,000
- Time zone: UTC +5

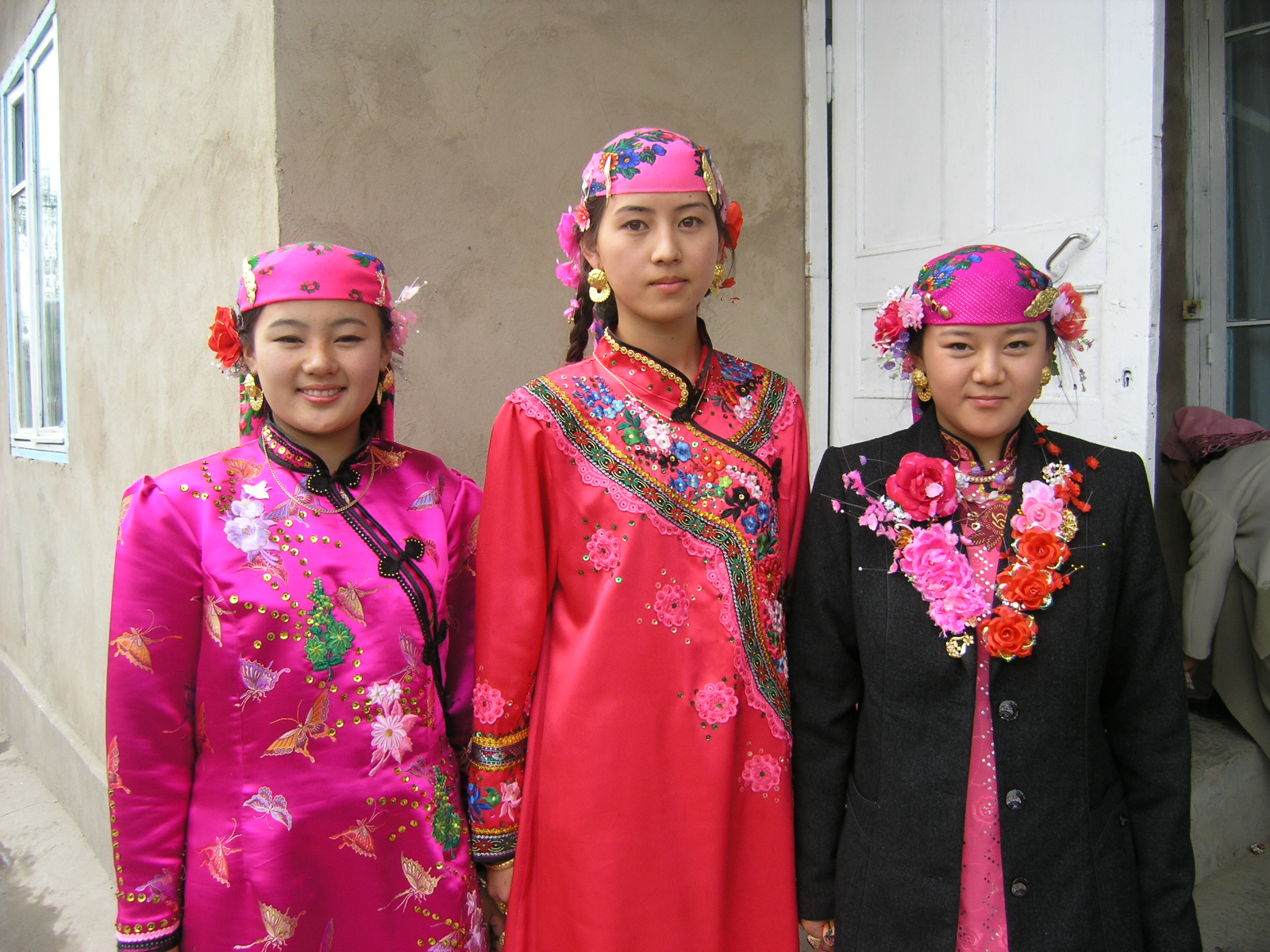
Dungan girls in Shor-Tyube, Kazakhstan

Sortobe (Kazakh: Сортөбе, Sortöbe; Russian: Сортобе, Sortobe; Dungan: Щёртюбе) is an urban-type settlement in Korday District of Jambyl Region of Kazakhstan. It is located on the Chu River, opposite and slightly downstream from the Kyrgyz city Tokmok. The population of 29,000 is approximately 90% Dungan.
