= Korday =

Korday Қордай (Kazakh) Qordai (Kazakh) Кордой (Kyrgyz)
- village
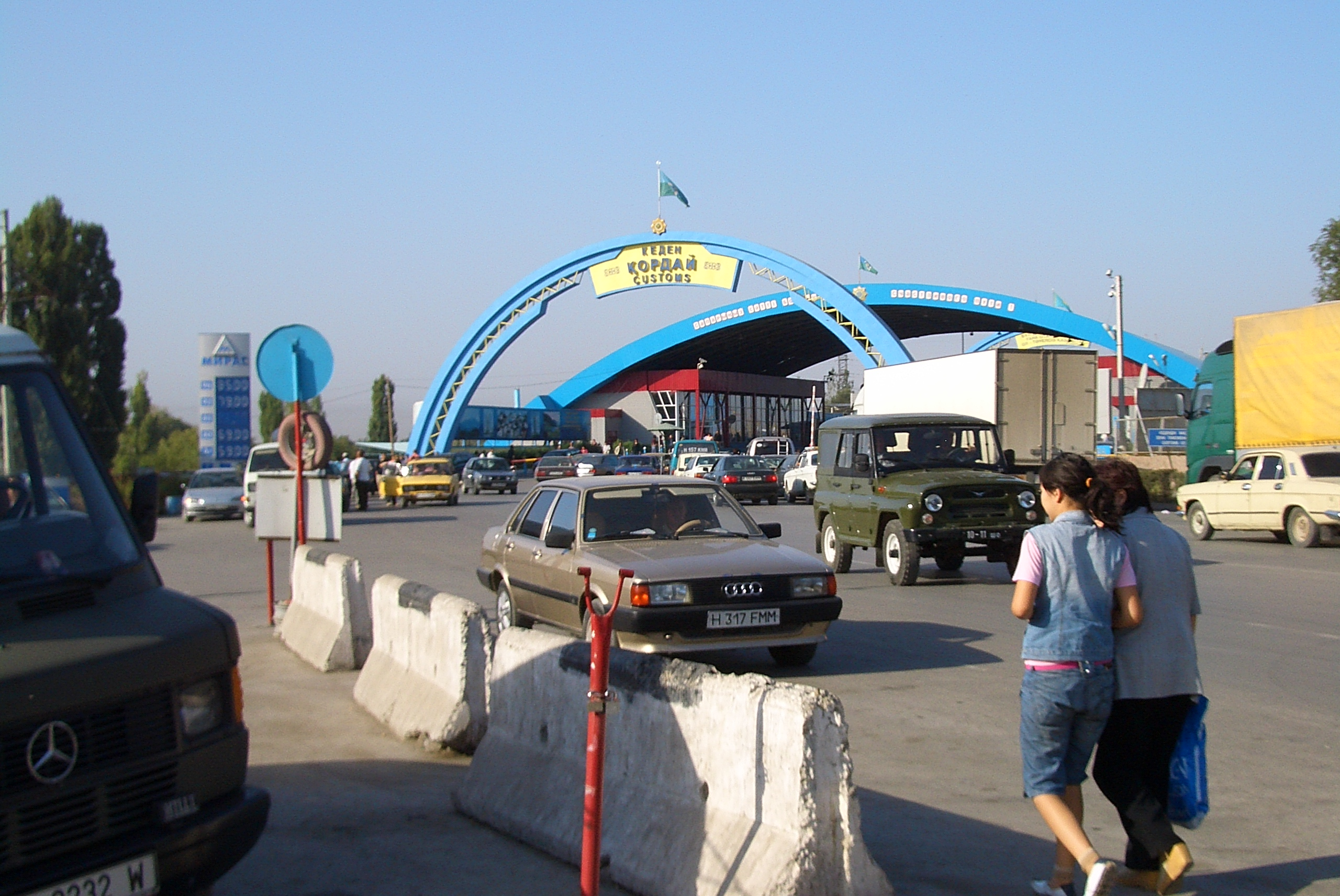
- Border checkpoint Kazakhstan at Korday
- Interactive map of Korday
- Location within Kazakhstan
- Coordinates: 43°2′13″N 74°42′41″E
- Country: Kazakhstan
- Region: Jambyl Region
- District: Korday District

Population (2023)
  - Total: 38 958
- Time zone: UTC+7

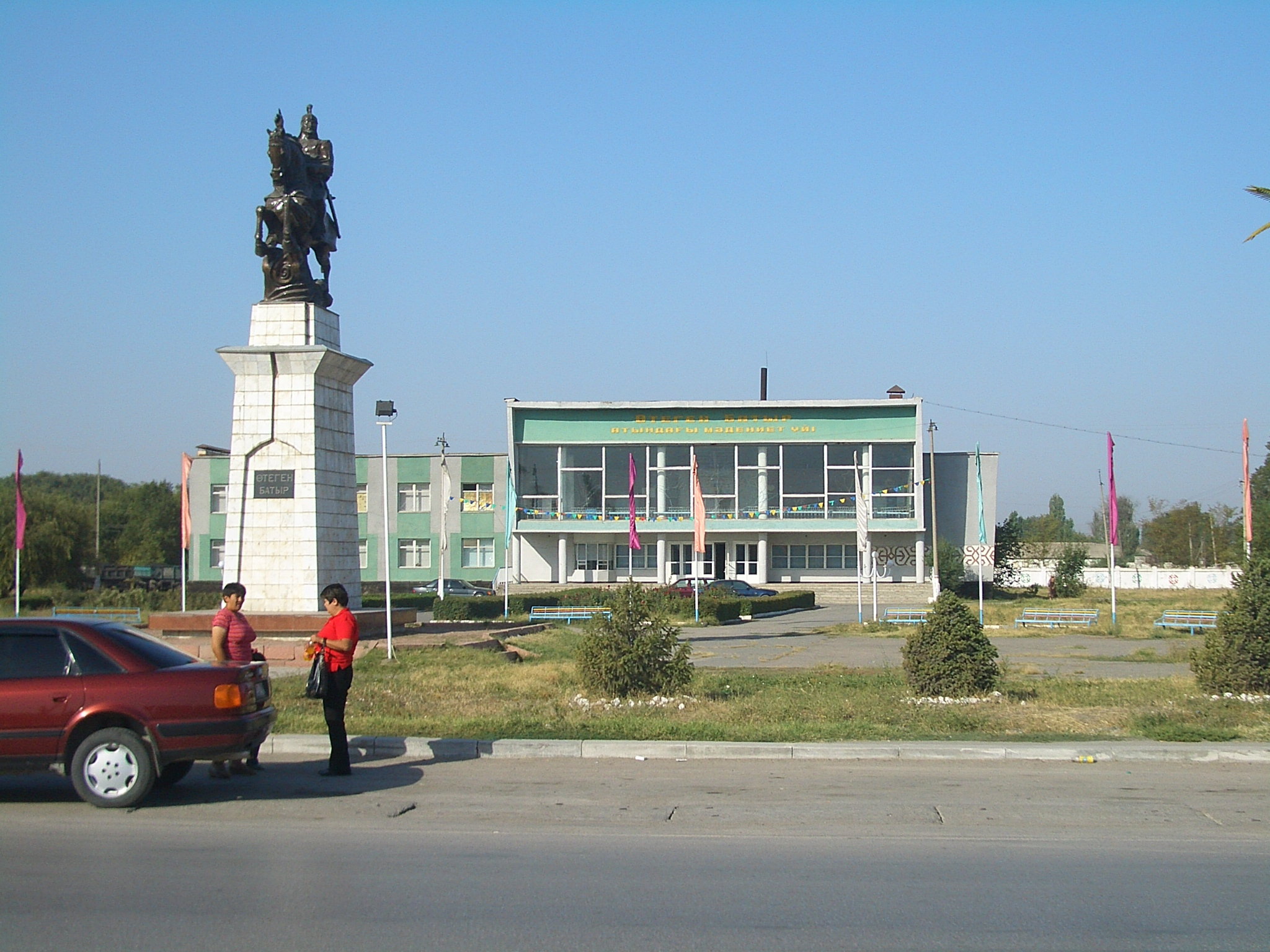
The Palace of Culture in Korday

Korday or Kordoy (Kazakh: Қордай, romanized: Qordai, pronounced [qwʊɾˈdɑj]; Kyrgyz: Кордой) is a village in Jambyl Region of Kazakhstan, and the administrative center of that region's Korday District. It has been formerly known under its old Russian name of Georgievka.

European route E40, known locally as Highway M-39 (based on the old USSR highway numbering scheme), on its way from Bishkek to Almaty crosses the Chu River at Korday, making Korday border crossing arguably the most important crossing on the Kazakh-Kyrgyz border. (The Kazakhstan point of entry is known as Korday, while its counterpart on the Kyrgyz side is called Akjol, or Akjol-Shu). Buses, passenger vans, and taxis take passengers from the Kyrgyz side of the crossing to Bishkek and from the Kazakh side to the railway junction of Shu, while others go directly between Bishkek and Almaty through the Korday checkpoint. Trucks carry goods, mostly Chinese imports, from Bishkek's Dordoy Bazaar to Kazakhstan and further on to Russia.

Incidents of truckers fording the Chu River away from the bridge, to circumvent the customs, have been reported as well.
