= Magaza Masanchi =

Dungan revolutionary and Soviet statesman (1886–1937)

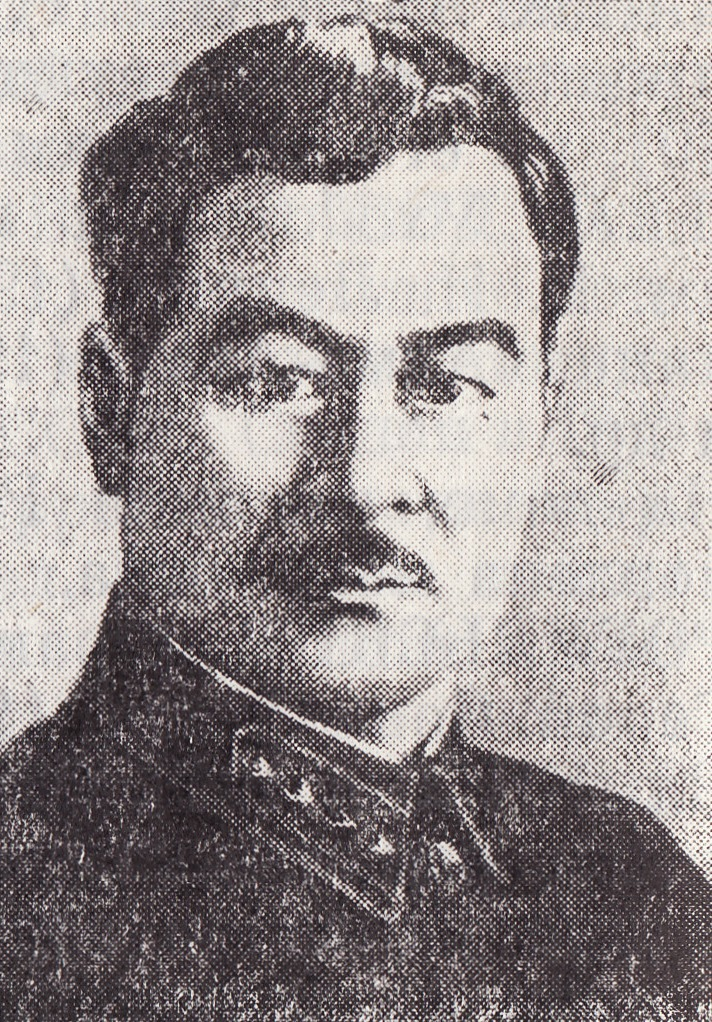
- Born: 27 July 1886; Alma-Ata, Russian Turkestan
- Died: 3 March 1938 (aged 51); Russian SFSR, Soviet Union
- Military career
- Allegiance: Soviet Union
- Unit: Dungan Cavalry Regiment
- Commands: Commander of the Dungan Cavalry Regiment
- Conflicts: World War I Russian Civil War Basmachi Movement

Magaza Masanchi
- Traditional Chinese: 馬三奇
- Simplified Chinese: 马三奇
Transcriptions
Standard Mandarin
- Hanyu Pinyin: Mǎ Sānqí
other Mandarin
- Dungan: Магәзы Масанчын

Magaza Masanchin
- Traditional Chinese: 馬三成
- Simplified Chinese: 马三成
Transcriptions
Standard Mandarin
- Hanyu Pinyin: Mǎ Sānchéng
other Mandarin
- Dungan: Магәзы Масанчын

Magaza Masanchi (27 July 1886 – 3 March 1938; Dungan: Магәзы Масанчын, romanized: Magəzь Masançьn) or Ma Sanqi (Chinese: 馬三奇) was a Dungan communist revolutionary commander and Soviet statesman. He participated in the Russian Revolution on the Bolshevik side. Karakunuz in Kazakhstan was renamed Masanchi after him. He was a victim of the Great Purge by Joseph Stalin.

== Career ==
Masanchi was born in Alma-Ata and his father was a farmworker.

During the Russian Civil War the Bolsheviks were interested in seeking the support of the non Russian Central Asian peoples. Dungans were invited to join the Red Army.

Dungans residing in town joined the Red Army after serving in the Tsarist forces when going back to Pishpek, fighting for the Soviets in Semirech'ye. However, Dungan peasants were apathetic to both sides in the Civil War, it was reported that the Bolsheviks committed atrocities against the indigenous inhabitants of Central Asia. On the side of the White Russians were Rich Dungans and the Islamic Dungan clerics.

Masanchi originally took part in World War I as a member of the Imperial Russian Army. After the Tsar was overthrown he went to Tashkent.

Masanchi commanded the Dungan Cavalry Regiment of the Red Army and was distinguished for his fighting against counter revolutionaries in Kazakhstan. Magaza Masanchi fought for the Soviet Union with Dmitry Furmanov. He became an official in Uzbekistan and Kazakhstan after the Civil War.

After going to the 1921 Third Congress of the Comintern Masanchi battled the Basmachi movement. He was also a member of the Soviet secret police.

Masanchi was a victim of the Stalinist Great Purge. He was rehabilitated later.
