= Cheng Changgeng =

- Born: November 22, 1811; Qianshan, Anhui, Qing Empire
- Died: January 24, 1880 (aged 68); Beijing, Zhili, Qing Empire
- Occupations: Hui opera and Peking opera performer
- Employer: Three Celebrations Company
- Known for: Laosheng roles

Chinese name
- Traditional Chinese: 程長庚
- Simplified Chinese: 程长庚
Transcriptions
Standard Mandarin
- Hanyu Pinyin: Chéng Chánggēng

Cheng Changgeng (22 November 1811 – 24 January 1880) was a Qing dynasty Hui opera and Peking opera artist based in Beijing, who specialized in laosheng roles, or old gentlemen. Sometimes called the "Father of Peking Opera", he was the leader of the Three Celebrations Company (三慶班) as well as the leader of the actor's guild in Beijing. He was from Qianshan, Anhui.

His disciple Tan Xinpei was also a famous Peking opera performer.

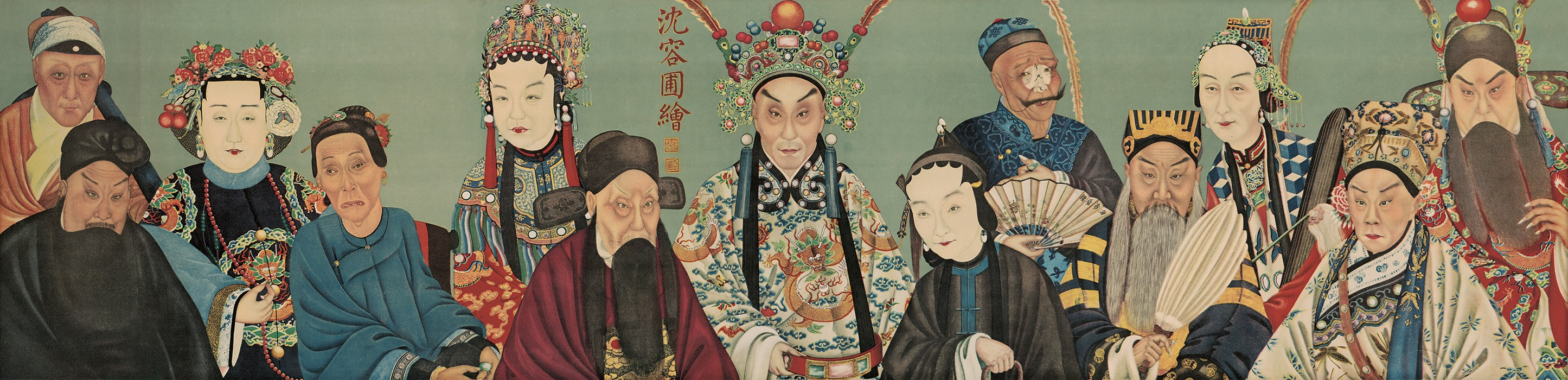
"Thirteen Masters of the Tongzhi and Guangxu Reigns" (同光十三絕), a late Qing dynasty painting by Shen Rongpu (沈容圃). Cheng Changgeng is 6th from left, dressed in the role of Lu Su.

== In popular culture ==
Actor Ji Qilin starred as Cheng Changgeng in the 1994 TV series Big Boss Cheng Changgeng (大老板程長庚). Kunqu master Cong Zhaohuan (丛兆桓) portrayed Cheng Changgeng in the 1996 TV series The Incredible Injustice to an Opera Actor (粉墨奇冤). Peking opera performer Li Haotian (李浩天) played Cheng Changgeng in the 2002 comedy TV series The Best Clown Under Heaven (天下第一丑).
