= Ruhrort =

District in Duisburg, Germany

Coordinates: 51°27′22″N 6°43′56″E

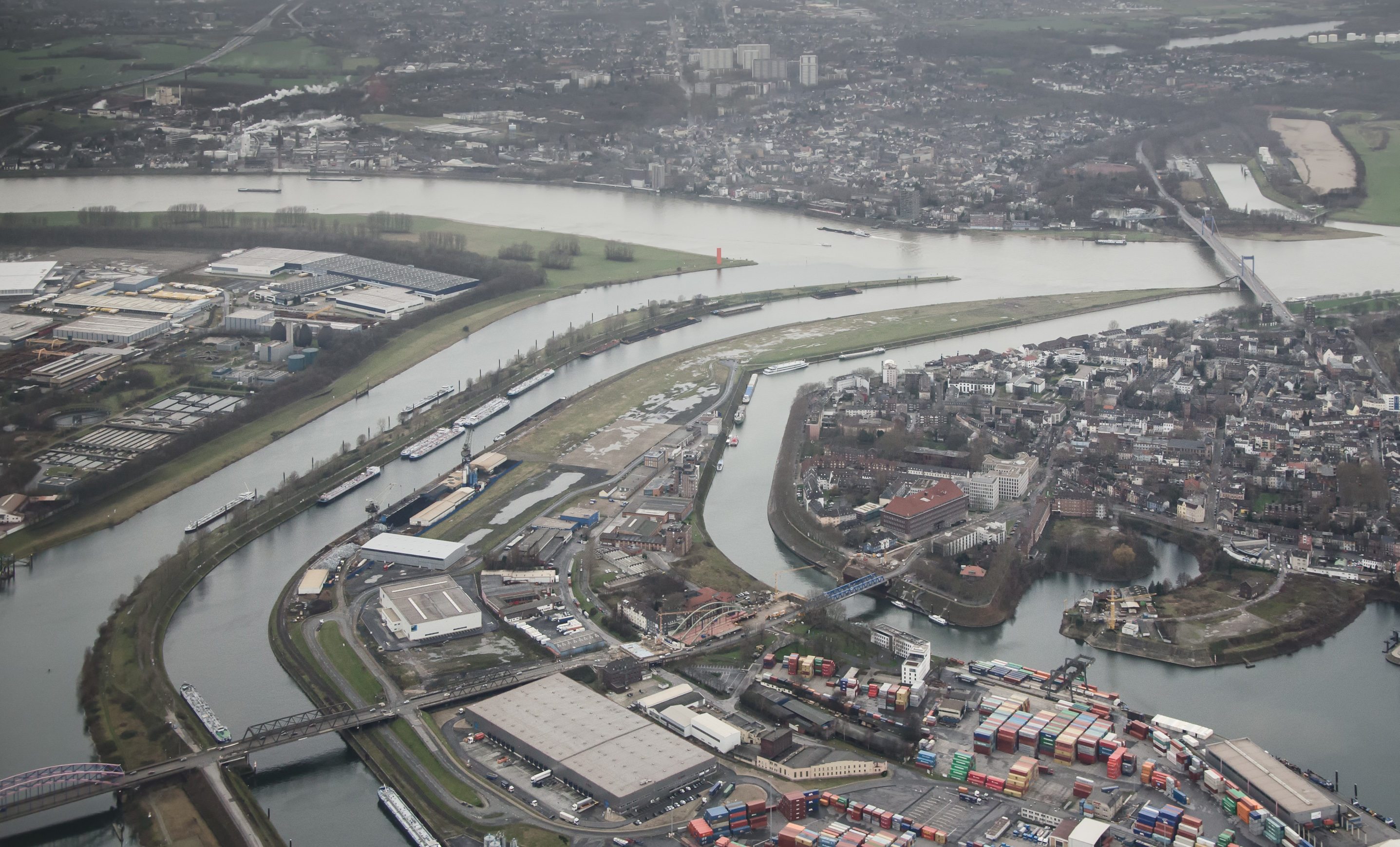
The Ruhrort Harbor in 2014

Ruhrort (German pronunciation: [ˈʁuːɐ̯ʔɔʁt]) is a district in the borough of Homberg/Ruhrort/Baerl within the German city of Duisburg situated north of the confluence of the Ruhr and the Rhine, in the western part of the Ruhr area. Ruhrort has the largest river harbour in the world, with quays extending nearly 40 kilometres along the river, and it is the principal inland shipping port in Germany.

== History ==
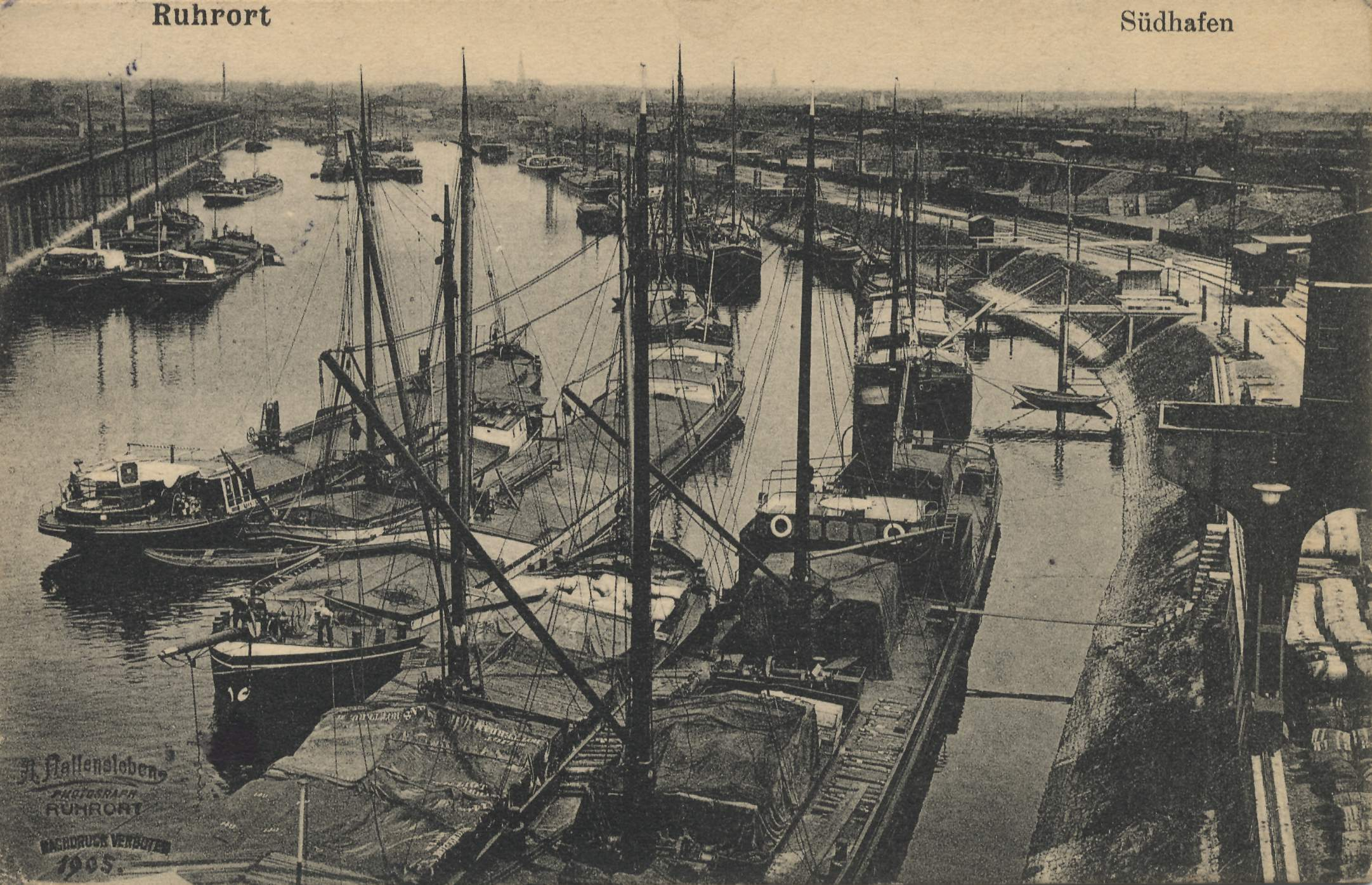
Ruhrort south harbor in 1905

Ruhrort was founded in 1371 as a customs site and was granted town status in 1551. Due to its convenient position on the junction of two important waterways a shipping guild and a harbour had been created by 1665, mainly for trading coal from the Ruhr Valley mines. The harbour was in steady competition with the harbour of Duisburg which was located only 3 kilometers to the south.

In 1701 the town fell to Prussia and the government, who had taken over the control over the harbour by 1766, gradually expanded the docks and basins. When the Köln-Mindener Eisenbahn built its railway via the nearby towns of Duisburg and Oberhausen it connected Ruhrort to their network in 1848 and constructed the so-called "Eisenbahnhafen" (railway harbour) in order to convey their trains to the areas west of the Rhine by train ferries. During the 1860s the vast north and south basins ("Nordhafen" and "Südhafen") were built.

These ideal transport links led to the foundation of a steel mill to the north-east of the railway station. Although many new workers were needed for the new facilities Ruhrort did not grow very much. This was due to the town being surrounded by water on 3 sides with expansion towards the north-east blocked by the railway and the new industries. Therefore, the population remained almost constantly between 8000 and 10000 during these years.

The beginning of the 20th century saw the neighbouring village of Beeck incorporated into Ruhrort, and barely two years later in 1905 the city of Duisburg was established, absorbing Ruhrort along with the towns of Meiderich, Marxloh and Hamborn, having a joint population of approximately 200,000.

After the merger of the towns it was decided that the harbour of Ruhrort should be expanded further to join a new canal from Duisburg to Herne and on to Dortmund and the North Sea. In 1908 the basins A, B and C had been completed east of the existing harbour and a large railway yard was built to the north. The harbour had reached the size it retains until today. Being an important transport link Ruhrort was heavily bombed during World War II.

In the 21st century, Ruhrort became a major destination of container trains from China. According to a 2018 report, it is either the destination, or one of the destinations, of some 80% of all direct China-Western Europe cargo trains.

== Demographics ==
Today Ruhrort has 5,467 inhabitants (as of Sep. 1st, 2004), 806 of which are of foreign origin, mainly from Southern Europe and the Middle East.

== Public transport ==
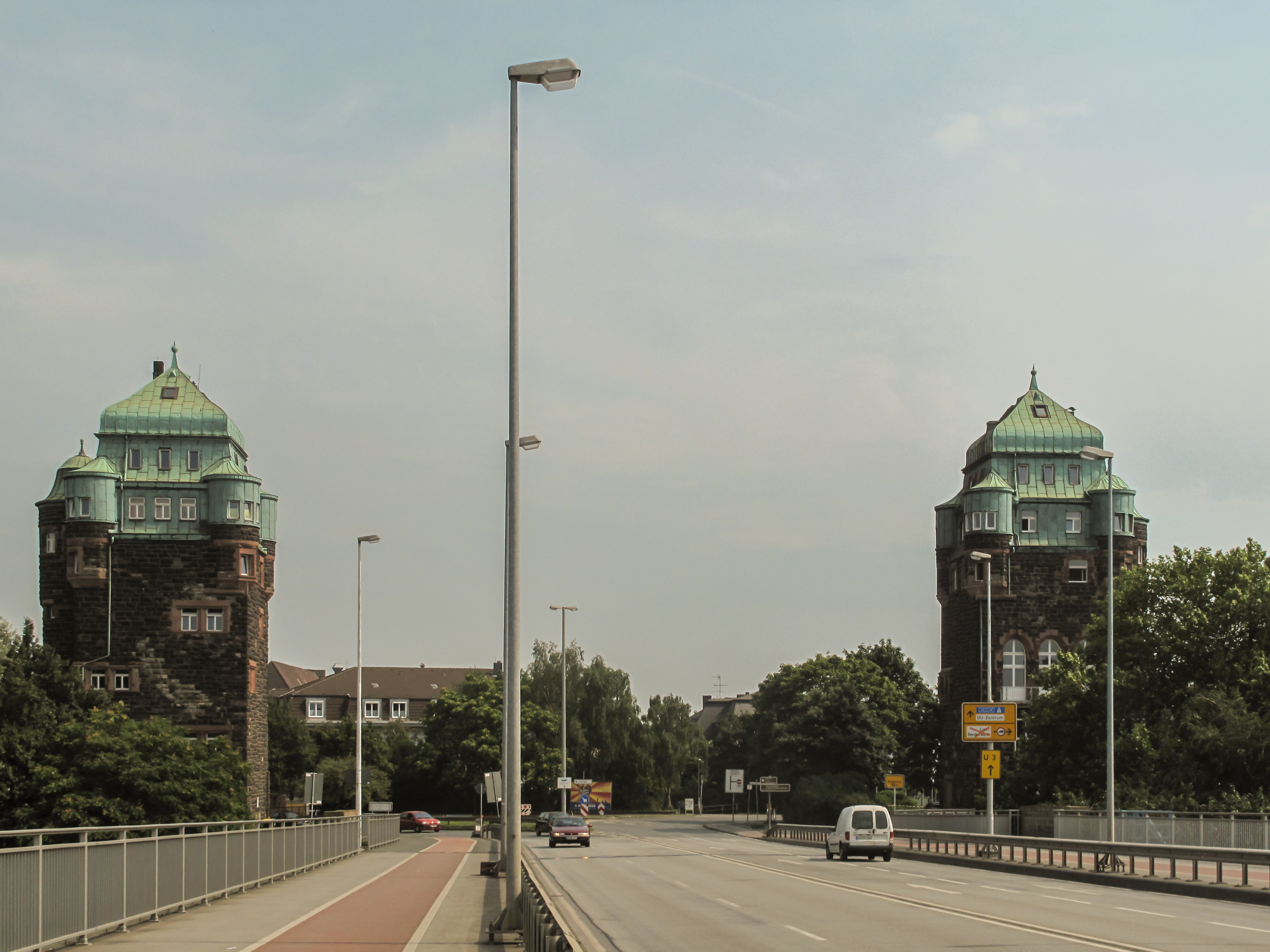
Old towers of the Friedrich Ebert Bridge across the Rhine

Public Transport in Ruhrort is provided by the "Duisburger Verkehrsgesellschaft" ("DVG") which operates one tram line (Line 901) and several bus lines that connect to other parts of the city. Duisburg-Ruhrort station, which lies north of central Ruhrort has been downgraded and is currently only served by a commuter line to Oberhausen operated by the private company "Prignitzer Eisenbahn".

== Economy ==
- The major employer in Ruhrort still is the port and the companies operating there. Around 17,000 people work directly or indirectly in the logistics industry.
- Although the furnaces of the steel mill have long been demolished, Mittal Steel still operates an oxygen steel plant in Ruhrort.
- The Haniel trading company has its headquarters in Ruhrort.

== Sights ==
Ruhrort is home to the German Inland Waterways Museum (Museum der deutschen Binnenschifffahrt) which is housed in the old swimming pool building. Visitors can also board one of the tour vessels for a view behind the scenes of the harbour. A walk on the promenade facing the Rhine and the quays is quite popular among tourists as well as locals. Ruhrort nowadays lacks the grimy air of a port district and is a neat little village with narrow streets, small parks and some fine cafes.

== People ==
- Walter de Gruyter (1862-1923), German publisher and company founder
- Friedrich Albin Hoffmann (1843-1924), German internist
- August Kraus (1868-1934), German sculptor
- Adolf Uzarski (1885-1970), German painter, illustrator and artist
