= Ruhr =

Urban area in North Rhine-Westphalia, Germany

Ruhr area Ruhrgebiet
- Ruhr Metropolis; Metropole Ruhr
- Logo

- Map of the Ruhr within Germany
- Interactive map of Ruhr area
- Coordinates: 51°30′N 7°15′E
- Country: Germany
- State: North Rhine-Westphalia
- Largest cities: List: Dortmund; Essen; Duisburg; Bochum

Government
  - Body: Regionalverband Ruhr

Area
  - Metro: 4,435 km^{2} (1,712 sq mi)
- Highest elevation: 441 m (1,447 ft)
- Lowest elevation: 13 m (43 ft)

Population (2022)
  - City: 5,147,820
  - Urban density: 1,160/km^{2} (3,000/sq mi)
  - Metro: 10,680,783

GDP
  - Urban: €180.467 billion (2021)
- Time zone: UTC+01:00 (CET)
- Website: www.rvr.ruhr

The Ruhr area (/ˈrʊər/ ROOR; German: Ruhrgebiet [ˈʁuːɐ̯ɡəˌbiːt], also Ruhrpott [ˈʁuːɐ̯pɔt]), also referred to as the Ruhr District, Ruhr Region, or Ruhr Valley, is a polycentric urban area in North Rhine-Westphalia, Germany. (Note: Other colloquial names that are used include Ruhrpott, Revier or Kohlenpott.: "The Heavy Industrial Belt' is commonly, though inaccurately, referred to as the Ruhr. This is a belt of low and level land on the northern edge of the uplands, known as the Sauerland through which flows the Ruhr from east to west" (Dickinson 1945, p. 70).; "Few foreigners know that in fact 'the Ruhr' is the name of a 150-mile-long Rhine right-bank tributary which, after meandering through the industrial basin now named after it, enters its parent near Europe's greatest inland port, Duisburg" (GI staff 1966, p. 30).; "The territory through which the Ruhr flows is called the Ruhr district" (Osmańczyk & Mango 2003, p. 1970).; "Many industries were built in the Ruhr region, where both iron ore and coal were found" (Lane 2001, p. 24).) With a population density of 1,160/km^{2} and a population of over 5 million (2017), it is the largest urban area in Germany and the third largest in the European Union. It consists of several large cities bordered by the rivers Ruhr to the south, Rhine to the west, and Lippe to the north. In the southwest it borders the Bergisches Land. It is considered part of the larger Rhine-Ruhr metropolitan region of more than 10 million people, which is the third largest in Western Europe, behind only London and Paris.

The Ruhr cities are, from west to east: Duisburg, Oberhausen, Bottrop, Mülheim an der Ruhr, Essen, Gelsenkirchen, Bochum, Herne, Witten, Hagen, Dortmund, Hamm and the districts of Wesel, Recklinghausen, Unna and Ennepe-Ruhr-Kreis. The most populous cities are Dortmund (with a population of approximately 612,065), Essen (about 583,000) and Duisburg (about 503,000).

In the Middle Ages, the Hellweg was an important trade route from the region of the Lower Rhine to the mountains of the Teutoburg Forest. The most important towns of the region from Duisburg to the imperial city of Dortmund were concentrated along the Hellweg from the Rhineland to Westphalia. Since the 19th century, these cities have grown together into a large complex with a vast industrial landscape, inhabited by some 7.3 million people (including Düsseldorf and Wuppertal, large cities that are nearby but officially not part of the Ruhr area).

The Ruhr area has no administrative centre; each city in the area has its own administration, although there is a supracommunal Ruhr Regional Association institution in Essen. For 2010, the Ruhr region was one of the European Capitals of Culture.

== Etymology ==
The 1911 edition of Encyclopædia Britannica has only one definition of "Ruhr": "a river of Germany, an important right-bank tributary of the lower Rhine". The use of the term "Ruhr" for the industrial region started in the United Kingdom only after World War I, when French and Belgian troops had occupied the Ruhr district and seized its prime industrial assets in lieu of unpaid reparations in 1923. In 1920, the International Labour Office published a report entitled Coal Production in the Ruhr District. In 1923, the Canadian Commercial Intelligence Journal, Volume 28, Issue 1013, includes the article, "Exports from the Ruhr district of Germany". In 1924 the English and American press was still talking of the "French occupation of the Ruhr Valley" or "Ruhr District". A 62-page publication seems to be responsible for the use of "Ruhr" as a short form of the then more common "Ruhr District" or "Ruhr Valley": Ben Tillett, A. Creech-Jones and Samuel Warren's The Ruhr: The Report of a Deputation from the Transport and General Workers Union (London 1923). Yet "The report of a deputation from the Transport and General Workers' Union which spent a fortnight examining the problems in the Ruhr Valley", published in The Economic Review, Volume 8, 1923, is still using the traditional term. In the same year, "Objections by the United States to discriminatory regulations on exports from the occupied region of the Ruhr" was published in Papers Relating to the Foreign Relations of the United States.

The 1926 Encyclopædia Britannica, in addition to its article on the river Ruhr, has a further article on "RUHR, the name given to a district of Westphalia, Germany". Thus the name "Ruhr" was given to the region (as a short form of "Ruhr District" or "Ruhr Valley") only a few years before the publication of this edition of the Encyclopædia Britannica. Even after World War II, the term "Ruhr" may not have been in general use for the region: it was defined in Documents on American Foreign Relations (1948): "For the purposes of the present Agreement: (i) the expression 'Ruhr' means the areas, as presently constituted, in Land North Rhine–Westphalia, listed in the Annex to this Agreement." However, Lawrence K. Cecil and Philip Hauge Abelson still write in 1967: "In the first place, the average person uses the term 'Ruhr' indiscriminately as the Ruhr River or the Ruhr district, two entirely different things. The Ruhr River is only one of half a dozen rivers in the Ruhr district, in addition to the Rhine. The Rhine itself runs through the heart of the Ruhr district." According to Merriam Webster's Geographical Dictionary, a standard reference on place names around the world, the name "Ruhr" refers to the river. The name preferred for the region in this dictionary is "Ruhrgebiet", followed by "Ruhr Valley".

== Geography ==
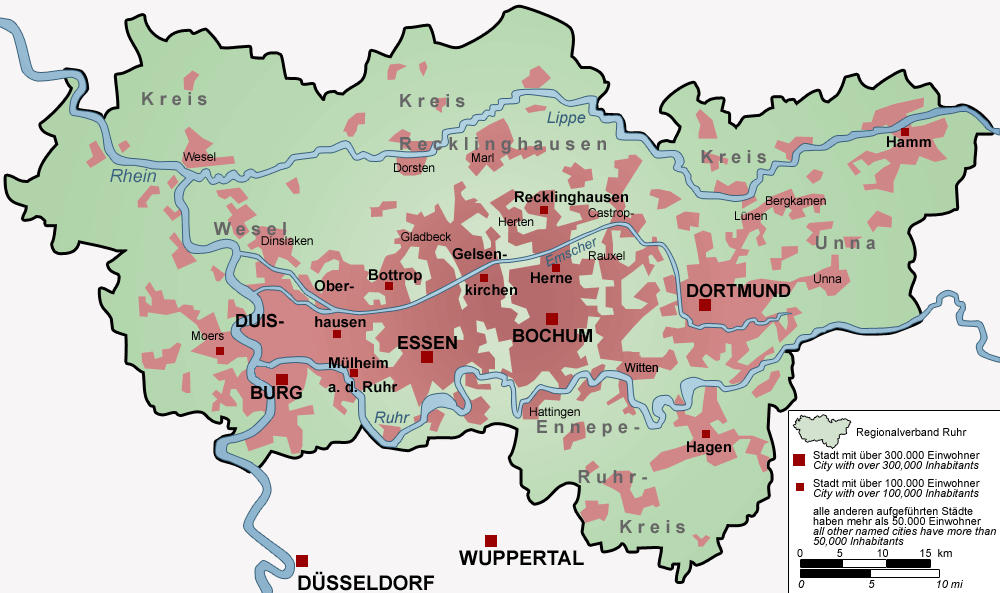
Map of the Ruhr area: In green is the Ruhr by a narrow definition, comprising municipalities that are members of the Ruhr regional institution.

The urban landscape of the Ruhr extends from the Lower Rhine Basin east to the Westphalian Plain and south to the hills of the Rhenish Massif. Through the centre of the Ruhr runs a segment of the loess belt that extends across Germany from west to east. Historically, this loess belt has underlain some of Germany's richest agricultural regions.

Geologically, the region is defined by coal-bearing layers from the upper Carboniferous period. The coal seams reach the surface in a strip along the river Ruhr and dip downward from the river to the north. Beneath the Lippe, the coal seams lie at a depth of 600 to 800 metres (2,000 to 2,600 feet). The thickness of the coal layers ranges from one to three metres (three to ten feet). This geological feature played a decisive role in the development of coal mining in the Ruhr.

According to the Regionalverband Ruhr (RVR, Ruhr Regional Association), 37.6% of the region's area is built up. A total of 40.7% of the region's land remains in agricultural use. Forests account for 17.6%, and bodies of water and other types of land use occupy the rest. The inclusion of four mainly rural districts in the otherwise mainly industrial Ruhr helps to explain the large proportion of agricultural and forested land. In addition, the city boroughs of the Ruhr region have outlying districts with a rural character.

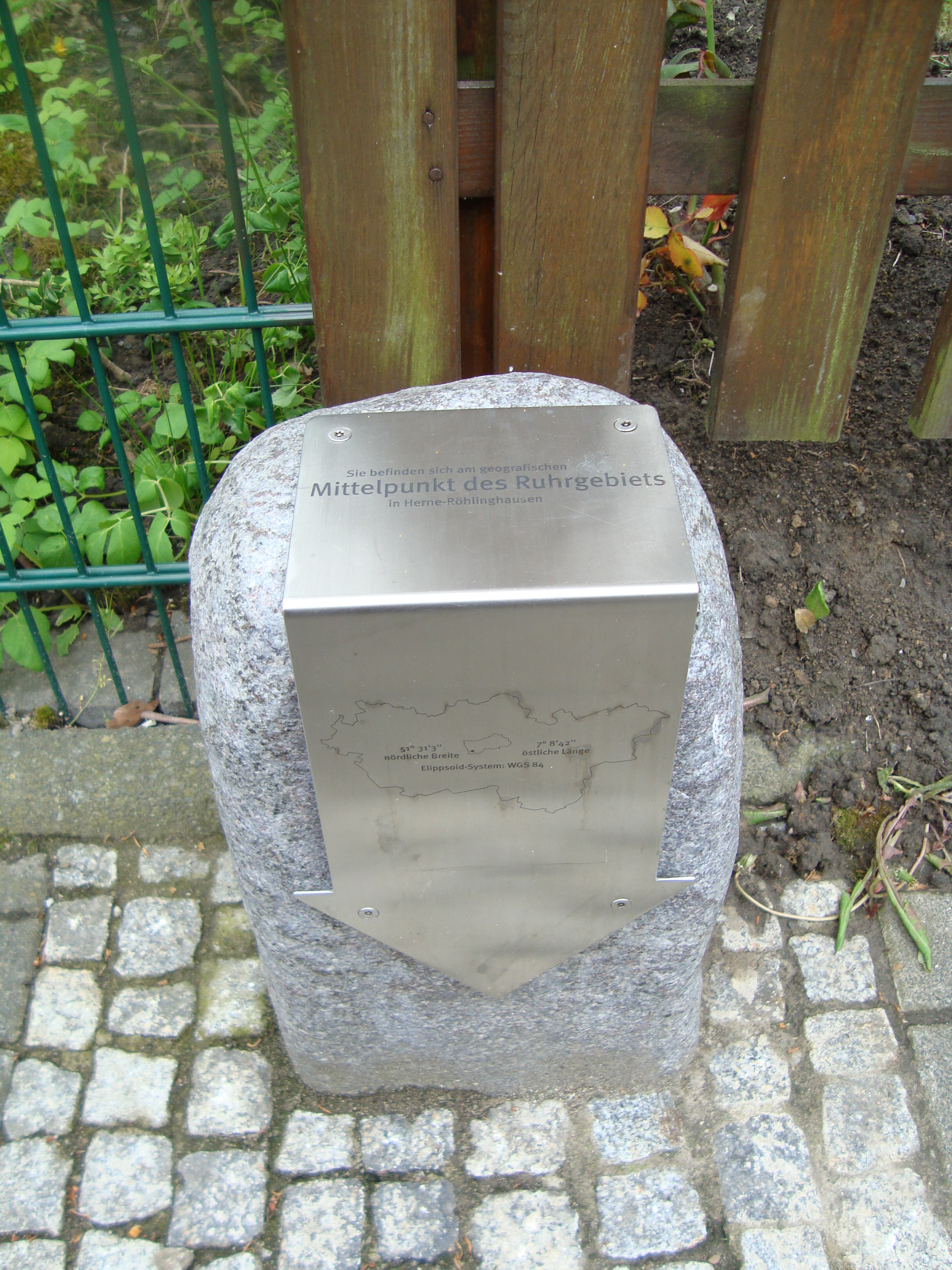
Geographic center of the Ruhrgebiets (51.51758°N 7.14507°E), in the Röhlinghausen neighborhood of Herne.

Seen on a map, the Ruhr could be considered a single city, since there are no visible breaks between the individual city boroughs. Thus the Ruhr is described as a polycentric urban area, which shares a similar history of urban and economic development.

Because of its history, the Ruhr is structured differently from monocentric urban regions such as Munich, which developed through the rapid absorption of smaller towns and villages by the most significant city among them. Instead in the Ruhr, the individual city boroughs and urban districts of the Ruhr grew in a rapid and parallel fashion independently of one another during the Industrial Revolution. The population density of the central Ruhr is about 2,100 inhabitants per square kilometre (about 5,400 per square mile)—not too high compared to other German cities.

Between the constituent urban areas are relatively open suburbs and even some open land with agricultural fields. In many places however, the borders between cities in the central Ruhr are unrecognizable, blending into one urban landscape due to continuous development across them.

The replanting of brownfield land has created new parks and recreation areas in recent decades. The Emscher Landschaftspark (Emscher Landscape Park) lies along the river Emscher, formerly virtually an open sewer, parts of which have undergone natural restoration. This park connects strips of parkland running from north to south, which were developed through regional planning in the 1920s, to form a green belt between the Ruhr cities from east to west.

== Economy ==
Since the 1980s, the Ruhr region has been the target of financial support by the state, federal government and the EU. The region has lost inhabitants since 2000. While employment across Germany increased by about 8% since 2000, in the region employment increased by 3%.

== History ==
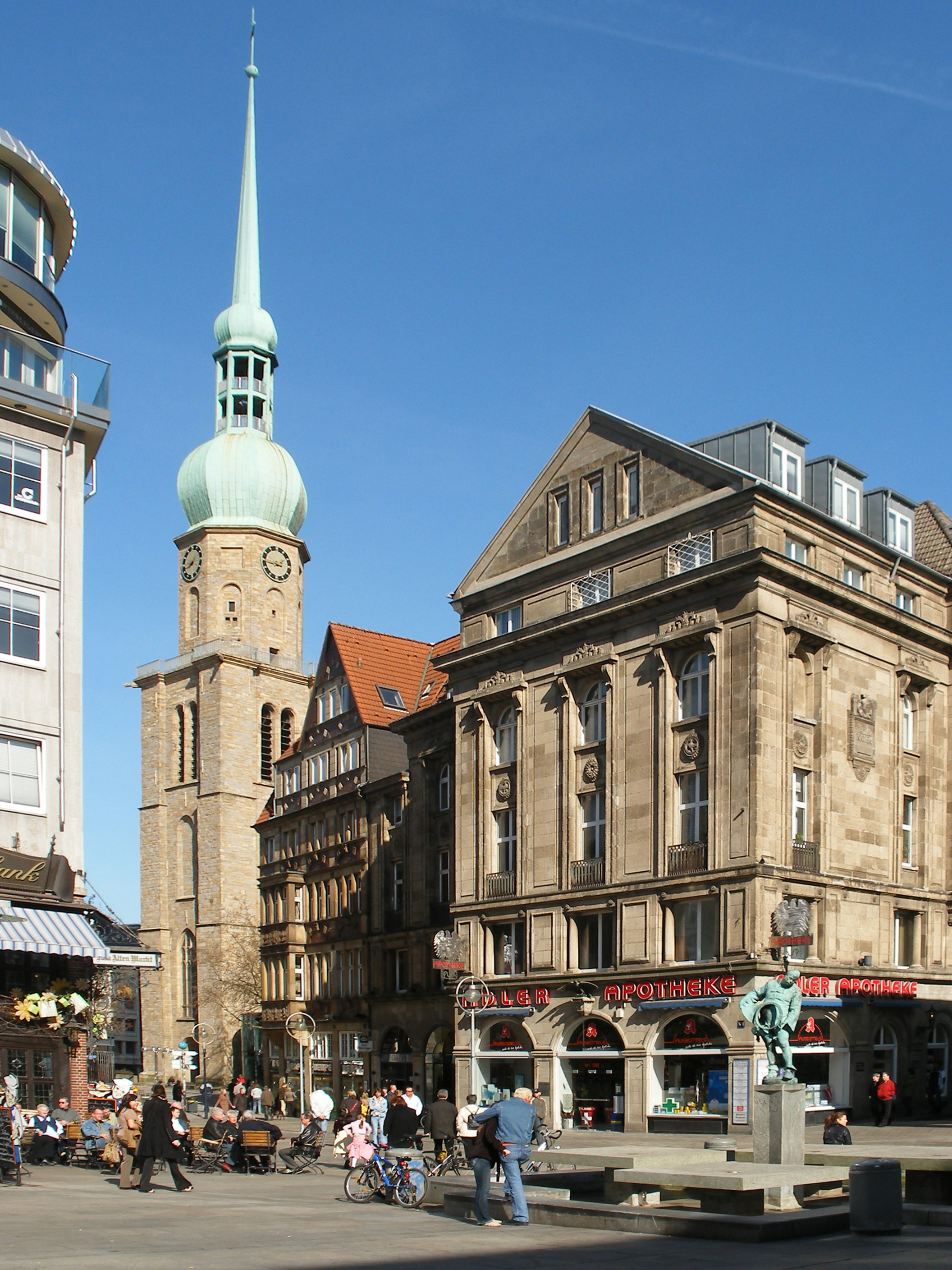
Old market square in Dortmund with St. Reinold's Church

During the Middle Ages, much of the region that was later called the Ruhrgebiet was situated in the County of Mark, the Duchy of Cleves and State of Berg and the territories of the bishop of Münster and the archbishop of Cologne. At the time it was in a part of The Holy Roman Empire. The region included some villages and castles, and was mainly agrarian: its loess soil made it one of the richer parts of western Germany. The free imperial city of Dortmund was the trading and cultural centre, lying on the Hellweg, an important east–west trading route, that also brought prosperity to the town of Duisburg. Both towns were members of the Hanseatic League.The Hanseatic League is the namesake of the German flag Carrier, Lufthansa.

=== Industrial revolution ===
The development of the region into an urbanized industrial area started in the late 18th century with the early industrialisation in the nearby Wupper Valley in the Bergisches Land. During the Napoleonic years it was part of the kingdom of Westphalia whose king was Napoleon Bonaparte's younger brother Jerome Bonaparte. During this time from 1807 to 1813 it was a client state of France. By around 1820 when the war was over, hundreds of water-powered mills were producing textiles, lumber, shingles and iron in automated processes here. In additional workshops in the hills, highly skilled workers manufactured knives, tools, weapons and harnesses, using water, coal and charcoal.

As the machines became bigger and moved from water power to steam power, locally mined coal and charcoal became expensive and there was not enough of it. The Bergische industry ordered more and more coal from the new coal mining area along the Ruhr. Impressive and expensive railways were constructed through the hilly Wupper region, to bring coal, and later steel, in from the Ruhr, and for outward transport of finished products.

Zollverein Coal Mine Industrial Complex in Essen, a UNESCO World Heritage Site since 2001

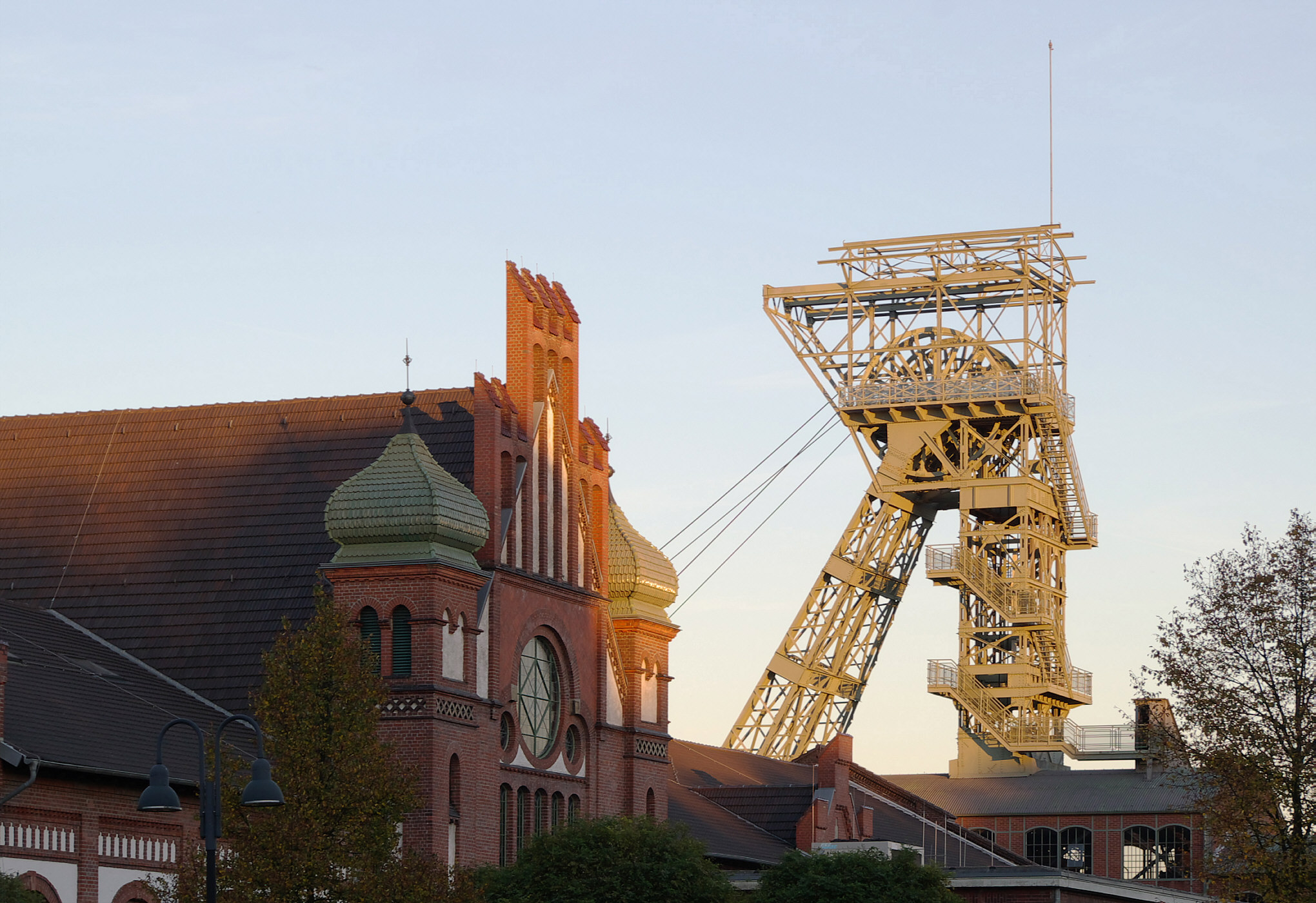
Zeche Zollern in Dortmund

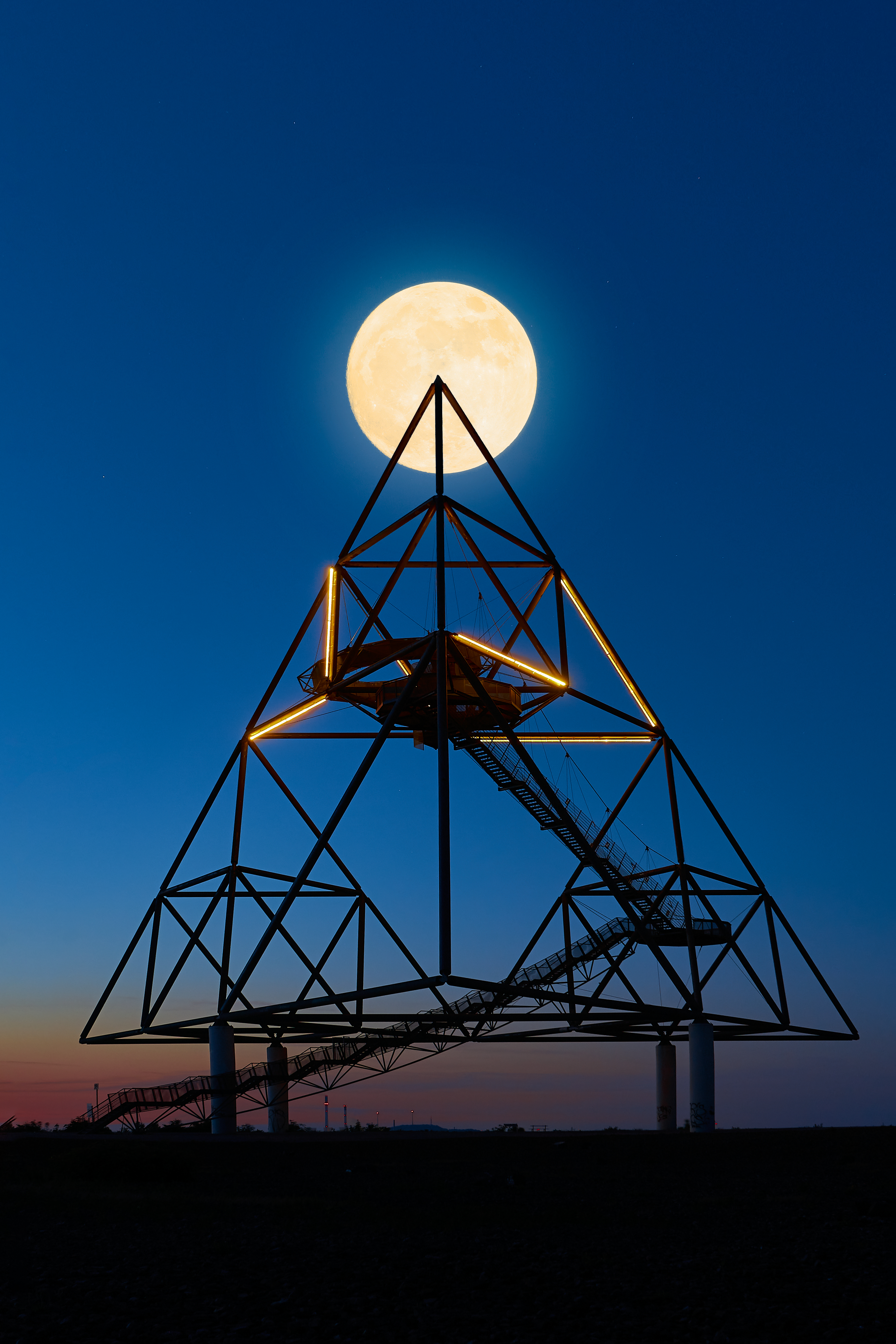
Tetrahedron in Bottrop

By 1850, there were almost 300 coal mines in operation in the Ruhr area, in and around the central cities of Duisburg, Essen, Bochum and Dortmund. The coal was exported or processed in coking ovens into coke, used in blast furnaces, producing iron and steel. In this period the name Ruhrgebiet became common. Before the coal deposits along the Ruhr were exhausted, the mining industry moved northward to the Emscher and finally to the Lippe, drilling ever deeper mines as it went. Locks built at Mülheim on the Ruhr led to the expansion of Mülheim as a port. With the construction of the Cologne-Minden railway in the late 19th century, several iron works were built within the borders of the present-day city of Oberhausen.

Moreover, the urbanization also boosted the expansion of railroad connections. At the beginning of the 1880s, agricultural regions did not benefit from the newly built transport facilities as much as non-agricultural regions did. This in its turn increased inequality, and made anthropometric measurements, e.g. height, more dependent on wages. In the long run, however, effects of the railroad proximity diminished.

Consequently, the population climbed rapidly. Towns with only 2,000 to 5,000 people in the early 19th century grew in the following 100 years to over 100,000. Skilled mineworkers were recruited from other regions to the Ruhr's mines and steel mills and unskilled people started to move in. From 1860 onwards there was large-scale migration of Polish speakers from Silesia, Pomerania, East Prussia and Posen to the Ruhr, who were known as Ruhrpolen since. The Poles were treated as second class citizens. In 1899 this led to a revolt in Herne of young Polish workers, who later established a Workers' Union. Skilled workers in the mines were often housed in "miners' colonies", built by the mining firms. By 1870, over 3 million people lived in the Ruhrgebiet and the new coal-mining district had become the largest industrial region of Europe.

During World War I, the Ruhrgebiet functioned as Germany's central weapon factory. At a big Essen company, F. Krupp A.G., the number of employees rose from 40,000 to 120,000 or more, in four years. They were partly women, partly forced labourers.

=== Weimar Republic ===
In the March 1920 Kapp Putsch, nationalist and monarchist elements with the armed support of Freikorps units attempted to overthrow the government of the Weimar Republic. It was able to defeat the putsch by advocating a general strike that all but shut down Berlin. The work action effectively ended the putsch, but in the Ruhr it was the instigation for an armed revolt whose aim was to replace the Weimar Republic with a soviet-style council republic. In the Ruhr Uprising, the Ruhr Red Army was able to take control of the Ruhr industrial area. The Reichswehr, with assistance from Freikorps units, put down the rebellion in early April 1920 and re-established the Weimar Republic's control of the district. An estimated 1,000 insurgents and 200 Reichswehr soldiers were killed in the battles.

In March 1921, French and Belgian troops occupied Duisburg, which under the Treaty of Versailles formed part of the demilitarized Rhineland. In January 1923 the whole Ruhr district was occupied after Germany failed to fulfill part of its World War I reparation payments as agreed in the Versailles Treaty. The German government responded with a policy of passive resistance, letting workers and civil servants refuse orders and instructions by the occupation forces. Production and transport came to a standstill and the financial consequences contributed to German hyperinflation. After passive resistance was called off in late 1923, Germany implemented a currency reform and negotiated the Dawes Plan, which led to the withdrawal of the French and Belgian troops from the Ruhr in 1925. However, the occupation of the Ruhr caused several direct and indirect consequences to the German economy and government, including accelerating the growth of right wing parties due to the Weimar government's inability to successfully resolve the problem.

=== Nazi period ===
On 7 March 1936, Adolf Hitler took a massive gamble by sending 30,000 troops into the Rhineland. As Hitler and other Nazis admitted, the French army alone could have destroyed the Wehrmacht. The French passed the problem to the British, who found that the Germans had the right to "enter their own backyard", and no action was taken. In the League of Nations, the Soviet delegate Maxim Litvinov was the only one who proposed economic sanctions against Germany. All restraint on German rearmament was now removed. France's eastern allies (the Soviet Union, Poland, Czechoslovakia, Romania and Yugoslavia) concluded that since the French refused to defend their own border, they certainly would not stand up for their allies in the East. Hitler could now continue eroding the alliance system that France had built since 1919. On 16 October 1936, Belgium repudiated the 1921 alliance with France and declared its absolute neutrality. In October 1937, Belgium signed a non-aggression pact with Germany.

WWII Ruhr Bombing Operations
- 1943 March–July: Battle of the Ruhr
- 1943 May: Operation Chastise
- 1944 October: Operation Hurricane
- 1944 September: Bombing of German oil facilities during World War II

During World War II, the bombing of the Ruhr in 1940–1944 caused a loss of 30% of plant and equipment (compared to 15–20% for German industry as a whole). A second battle of the Ruhr (6/7 October 1944 – end of 1944) began with an attack on Dortmund. The devastating bombing raids of Dortmund on 12 March 1945 with 1,108 aircraft – 748 Lancasters, 292 Halifaxes, 68 Mosquitos – was a record to a single target in the whole of World War II. More than 4,800 tons of bombs were dropped through the city centre and the south of the city.

In addition to the strategic bombing of the Ruhr, in April 1945, the Allies trapped several hundred thousand Wehrmacht troops in the Ruhr Pocket.

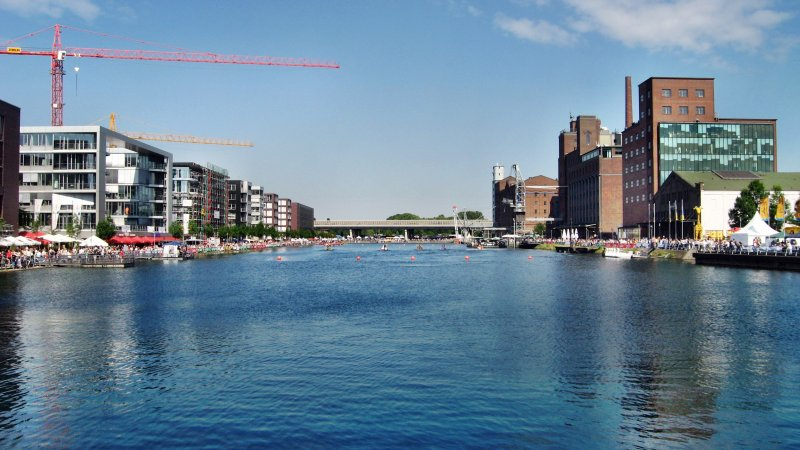
View of the redeveloped Duisburg Inner Harbour in 2010

=== Postwar period ===
After the war, the region fell within the British occupation zone, and Level of Industry plans for Germany abolished all German munitions factories and civilian industries that could support them and severely restricted civilian industries of military potential. The Ruhr Authority, an international body to regulate the Ruhr's coal and steel industries, was created as a condition for the establishment of the Federal Republic of Germany.

During the Cold War, the Western allies anticipated that any Red Army thrust into Western Europe would begin in the Fulda Gap and have the Ruhr as a primary target. Increased German control of the area was limited by the pooling of German coal and steel into the multinational European Coal and Steel Community in 1951. The nearby Saar region, containing much of Germany's remaining coal deposits, was handed over to economic administration by France as a protectorate in 1947 and did not politically return to Germany until January 1957, with economic reintegration occurring two years later. Parallel to the question of political control of the Ruhr, the Allies tried to decrease German industrial potential by limitations on production and dismantling of factories and steel plants, predominantly in the Ruhr. By 1950, after the virtual completion of the by-then much watered-down "level of industry" plans, equipment had been removed from 706 manufacturing plants in the west, and steel production capacity had been reduced by 6.7 million tons. Dismantling finally ended in 1951. In all, less than 5% of the industrial base was dismantled.

The Ruhr was at the centre of the German economic miracle Wirtschaftswunder of the 1950s and 1960s, as very rapid economic growth (9% a year) created a heavy demand for coal and steel.

After 1973, Germany was hard hit by a worldwide economic crisis, soaring oil prices, and increasing unemployment, which jumped from 300,000 in 1973 to 1.1 million in 1975. The Ruhr region was hardest hit, as the easy-to-reach coal mines became exhausted, and German coal was no longer competitive. Likewise the Ruhr steel industry went into sharp decline, as its prices were undercut by lower-cost suppliers such as Japan. The welfare system provided a safety net for the large number of unemployed workers, and many factories reduced their labor force and began to concentrate on high-profit specialty items.

As demand for coal decreased after 1958, the area went through phases of structural crisis (see steel crisis) and industrial diversification, first developing traditional heavy industry, then moving into service industries and high technology. The air and water pollution of the area are largely a thing of the past although some issues take a long time to solve. In 2005 Essen was the official candidate for nomination as European Capital of Culture for 2010.

== Climate ==
The Ruhr has an oceanic climate in spite of its inland position, with winds from the Atlantic travelling over the lowlands to moderate temperature extremes, in spite of its relatively northerly latitude that sees significant variety in daylight hours. A consequence of the marine influence is a cloudy and wet climate with low sunshine hours. Summers normally average in the low 20s, with winters being somewhat above the freezing point.

Climate data for Essen
Month	Jan	Feb	Mar	Apr	May	Jun	Jul	Aug	Sep	Oct	Nov	Dec	Year
Mean daily maximum °C (°F)	4.5 (40.1)	5.5 (41.9)	9.1 (48.4)	12.7 (54.9)	17.6 (63.7)	19.9 (67.8)	22.2 (72.0)	22.3 (72.1)	18.3 (64.9)	13.7 (56.7)	8.2 (46.8)	5.6 (42.1)	13.3 (55.9)
Daily mean °C (°F)	2.4 (36.3)	2.9 (37.2)	6.0 (42.8)	8.9 (48.0)	13.4 (56.1)	15.8 (60.4)	18.0 (64.4)	18.0 (64.4)	14.7 (58.5)	10.7 (51.3)	5.9 (42.6)	3.6 (38.5)	10.0 (50.0)
Mean daily minimum °C (°F)	0.2 (32.4)	0.3 (32.5)	2.9 (37.2)	5.0 (41.0)	9.1 (48.4)	11.6 (52.9)	13.7 (56.7)	13.7 (56.7)	11.1 (52.0)	7.6 (45.7)	3.6 (38.5)	1.6 (34.9)	6.7 (44.1)
Average precipitation mm (inches)	84.5 (3.33)	58.1 (2.29)	78.2 (3.08)	61.0 (2.40)	72.2 (2.84)	92.8 (3.65)	81.2 (3.20)	78.8 (3.10)	78.0 (3.07)	75.1 (2.96)	81.1 (3.19)	93.1 (3.67)	934.1 (36.78)
Average precipitation days	14.1	10.5	13.6	11.1	11.1	12.0	10.4	9.9	11.2	10.9	13.6	14.1	142.5
Average relative humidity (%)	83	82	78	75	74	76	78	80	79	81	82	80	79
Mean monthly sunshine hours	43.4	78.3	102.3	147.0	192.2	183.0	186.0	182.9	135.0	111.6	57.0	40.3	1,459
Source: World Meteorological Organization (UN), Hong Kong Observatory for data of sunshine hours

== Demographics ==
The ten largest cities of the Ruhr:

Pos.	Name	Pop. 2020	Area (km^{2})	Pop. per km^{2}	Map
1	Dortmund	587,696	280.37	2,071	
2	Essen	582,415	210.38	2,733	
3	Duisburg	495,885	232.81	2,154	
4	Bochum	364,454	145.43	2,652	
5	Gelsenkirchen	259,105	104.86	2,557	
6	Oberhausen	209,566	77.04	2,841	
7	Hagen	188,687	160.36	1,228	
8	Hamm	178,967	226.24	814	
9	Mülheim an der Ruhr	170,921	91.28	1,872	
10	Herne	156,940	51.41	3,100	

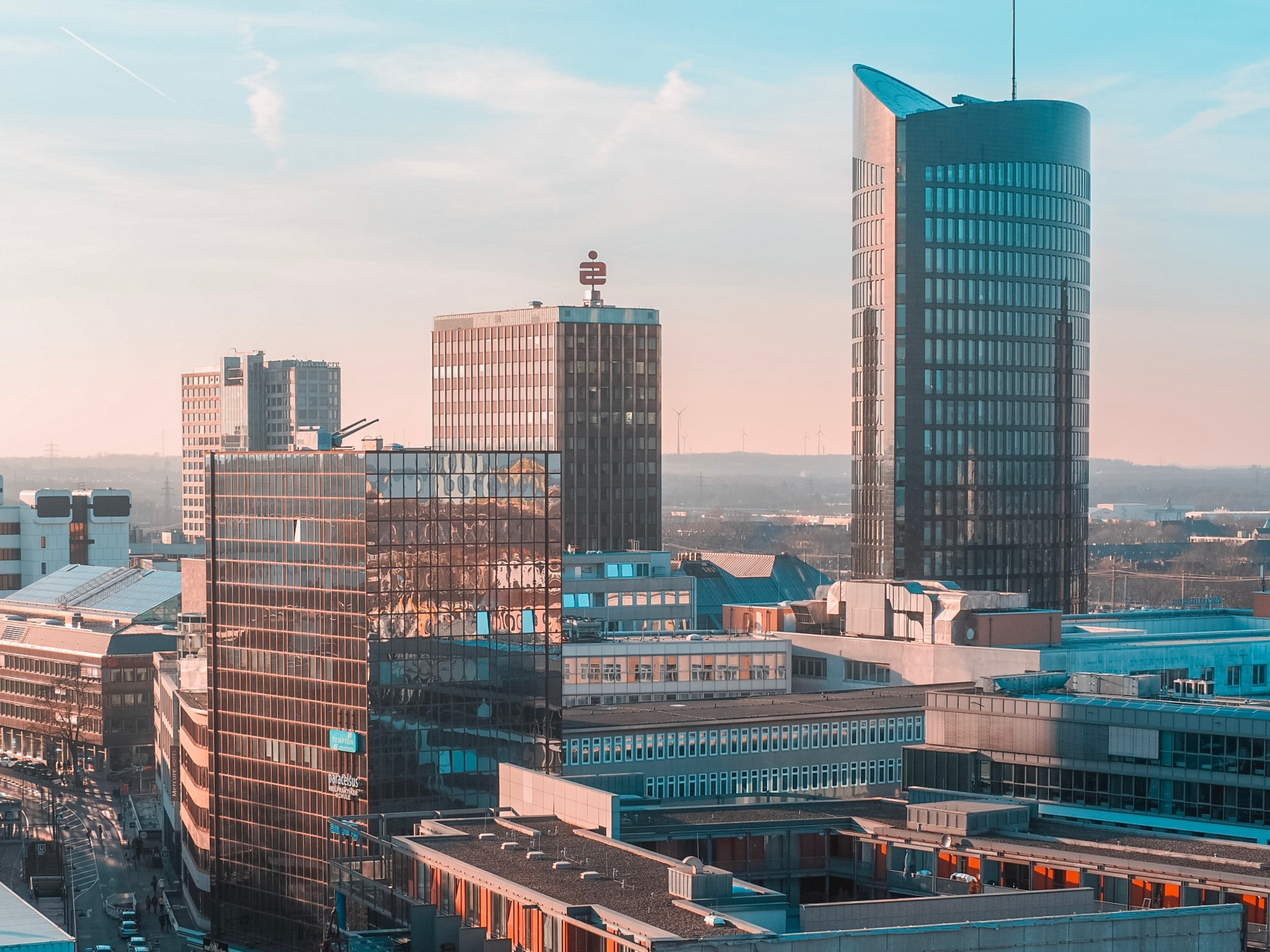
Dortmund is the largest city of the Ruhr.

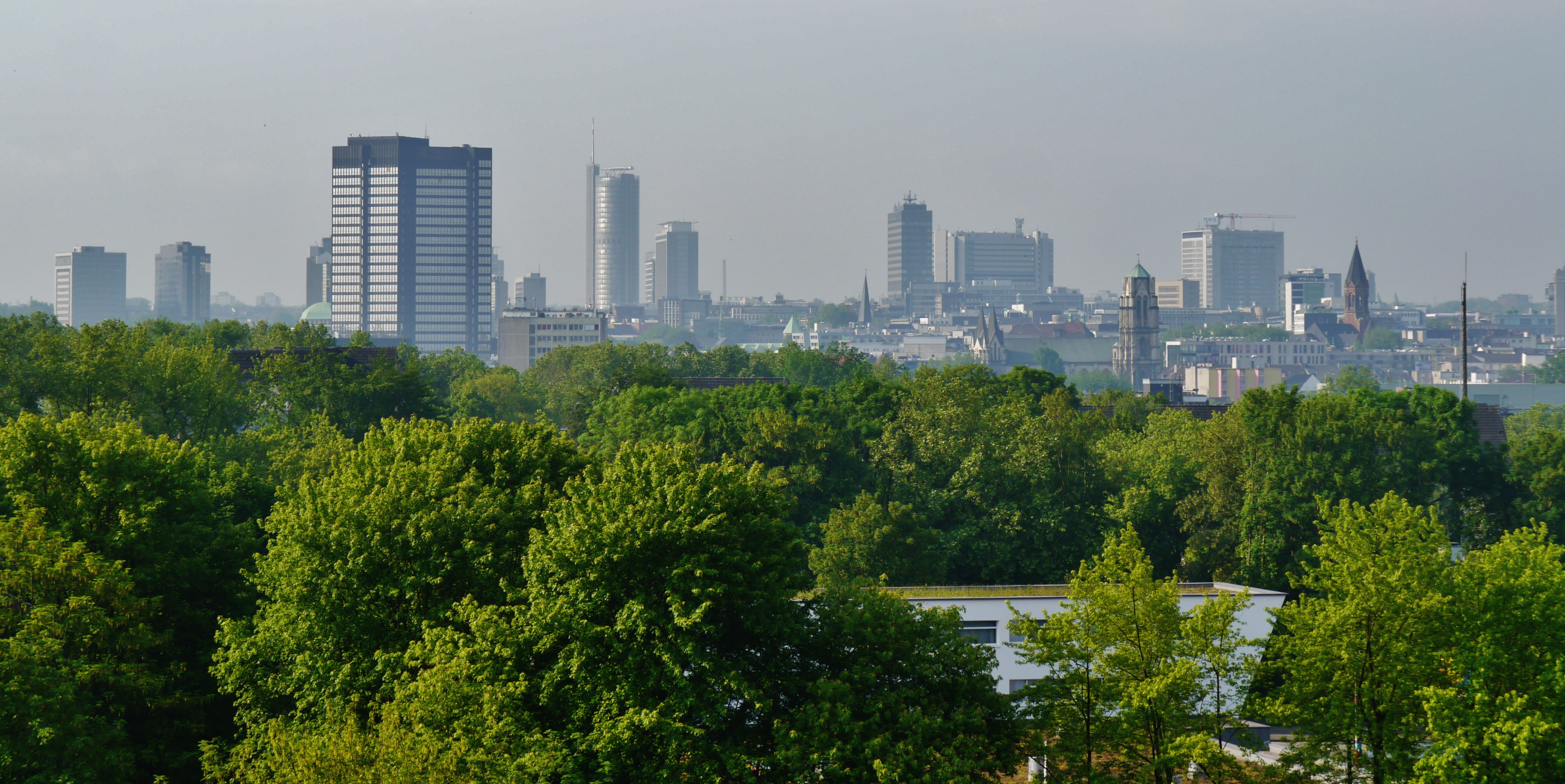
Essen is the second largest city of the Ruhr.

The local regiolect of German is commonly called Ruhrdeutsch (Ruhrgebietsdeutsch, Ruhrpottdeutsch, Ruhrpottisch, Ruhrpöttisch) although there is really no uniform regiolect that justifies designation as a single regiolect. It is rather a working-class sociolect with influences from the various dialects found in the area and changing even with the professions of the workers. A major common influence stems from the coal mining tradition of the area. For example, quite a few locals prefer to call the Ruhr either "Pott", which is a derivate of "Pütt" (pitmen's term for mine; cp. the English "pit"), or "Revier".

During the nineteenth century, the Ruhr attracted up to 500,000 Poles, Masurians and Silesians and a similar number of ethnic Germans from East Prussia, Silesia, and other eastern regions of the Kingdom of Prussia in a migration known as Ostflucht (flight from the east). By 1925, the Ruhrgebiet had around 3,800,000 inhabitants. Most of the new inhabitants came from Eastern Europe, but immigrants also came from France, Ireland, and the United Kingdom. It has been claimed that immigrants came to the Ruhr from over 140 countries. Almost all their descendants today speak German as a first language, and for various reasons, they do not identify with their Polish roots and traditions, often their Polish family names only remain as a sign of their past.

== Culture ==
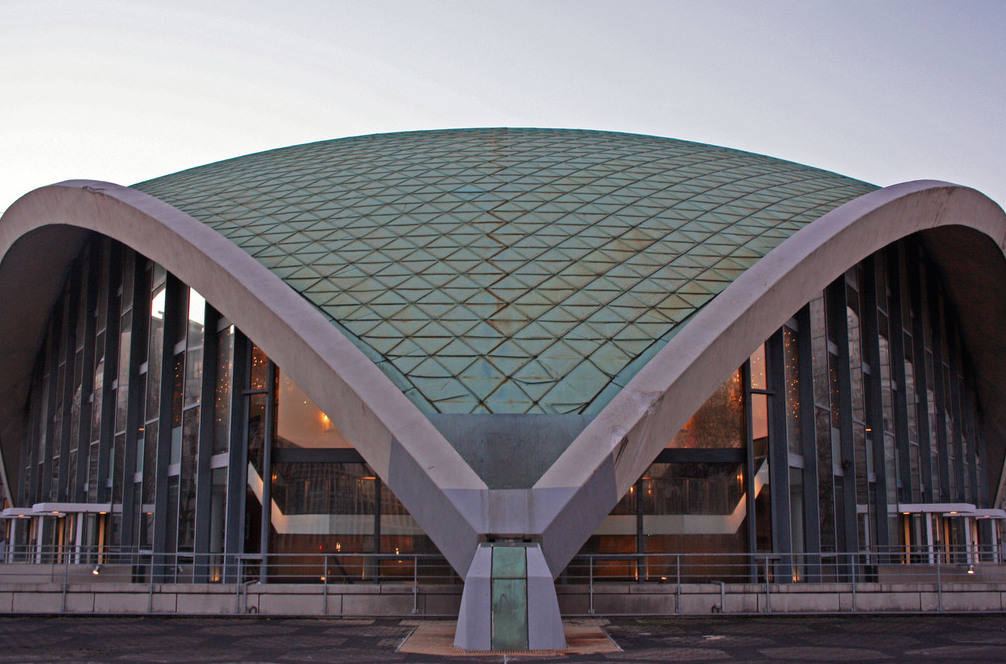
Opera Dortmund

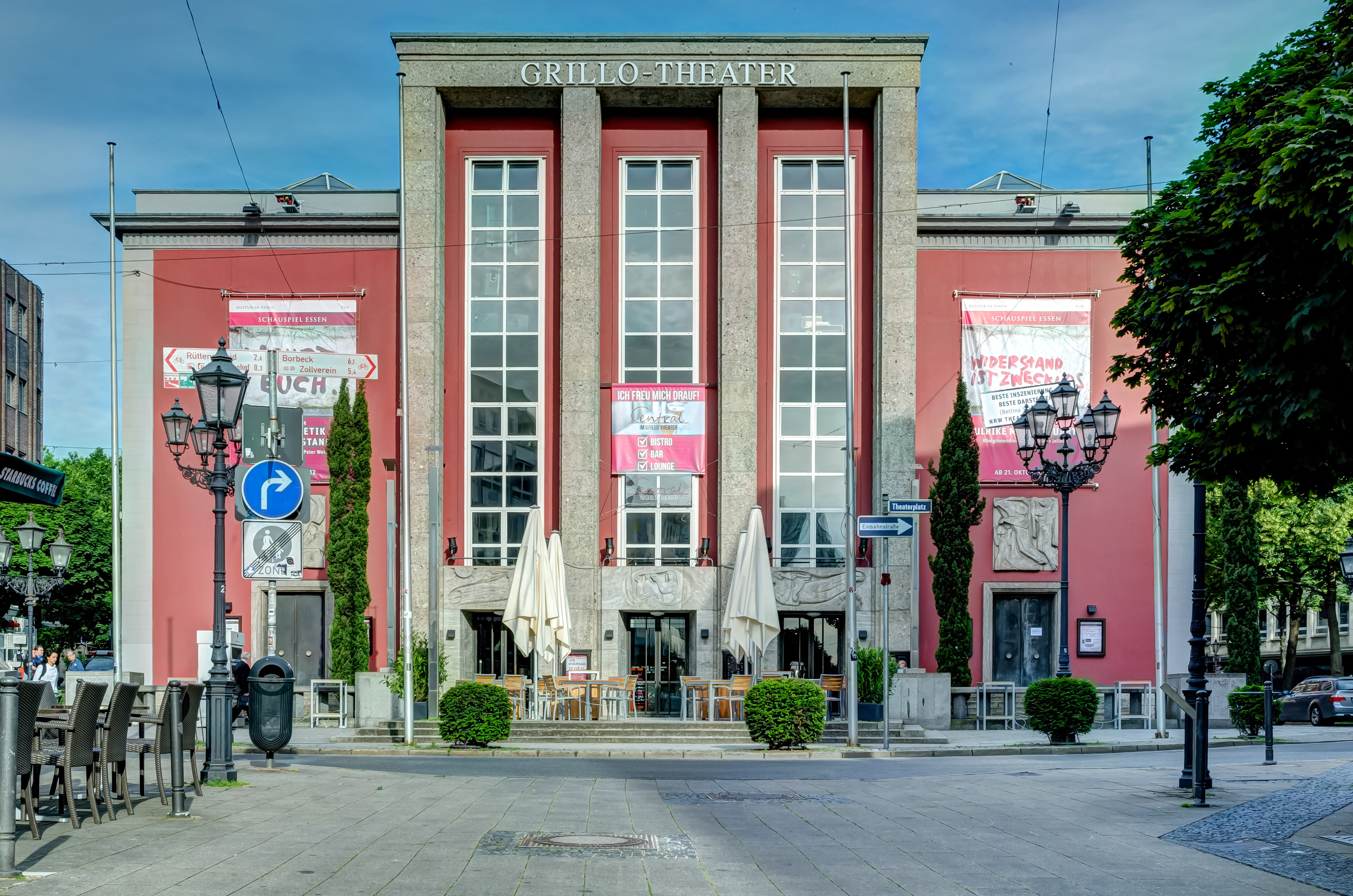
Grillo-Theater Essen

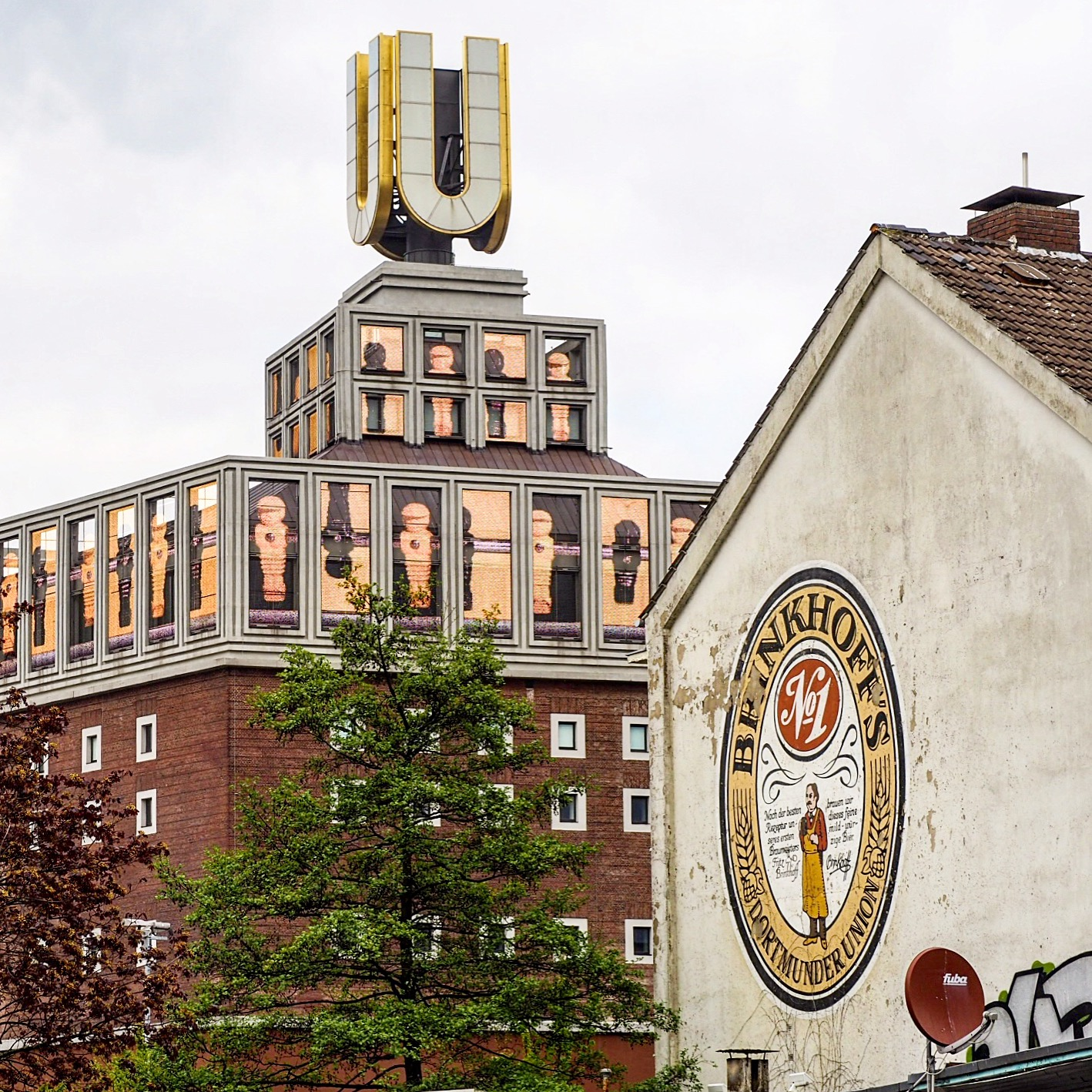
Ostwall Museum at U-Tower Dortmund

The Industrial Heritage Trail (German: Route der Industriekultur) links tourist attractions related to the European Route of Industrial Heritage in the Ruhr area.

Ruhr is known for its numerous cultural institutions, many of which enjoy international reputation. Ruhr has three major opera houses and more than 10 theaters and stages.

- Schauspielhaus Bochum
- Opernhaus Dortmund
- Theater Dortmund
- Theater Oberhausen
- German Opera on the Rhine at Duisburg
- Theater Essen
- Grillo-Theater at Essen

There are special classical music halls like the Bochumer Symphoniker, the Duisburg Mercatorhalle, the Saalbau Essen or the Dortmunder Philharmoniker. Each year in spring time, there is the Klavier-Festival Ruhr in the Ruhr area with 50 to 80 events of classical and jazz music.

With more than 50 museums, Ruhr has one of the largest variety of museums in Europe.

- German Mining Museum at Bochum
- German Football Museum at Dortmund
- Museum of Art and Cultural History at Dortmund
- Museum Ostwall at Dortmund
- Natural history museum at Dortmund
- Museum Folkwang at Essen
- Essen Cathedral Treasury at Essen
- Museum Küppersmühle at Duisburg
- Lehmbruck-Museum at Duisburg
- Hagen Open-air Museum at Hagen

Industrial Museum

- Zollern II/IV Colliery at Dortmund
- German Inland Waterways Museum at Duisburg
- Landschaftspark Duisburg-Nord at Duisburg
- Zollverein Coal Mine Industrial Complex at Essen (UNESCO World Heritage)
- Gasometer Oberhausen at Oberhausen
- Ewald Colliery at Herten, dedicated to green energy and a commercial and cultural park

The city of Essen (representing the Ruhr) was selected as European Capital of Culture for 2010 by the Council of the European Union.

In association football, the Revierderby is the rivalry between Borussia Dortmund and FC Schalke 04, and to a lesser extent between either club and/or VfL Bochum, MSV Duisburg or Rot-Weiss Essen (kleines Revierderby).

== Education ==
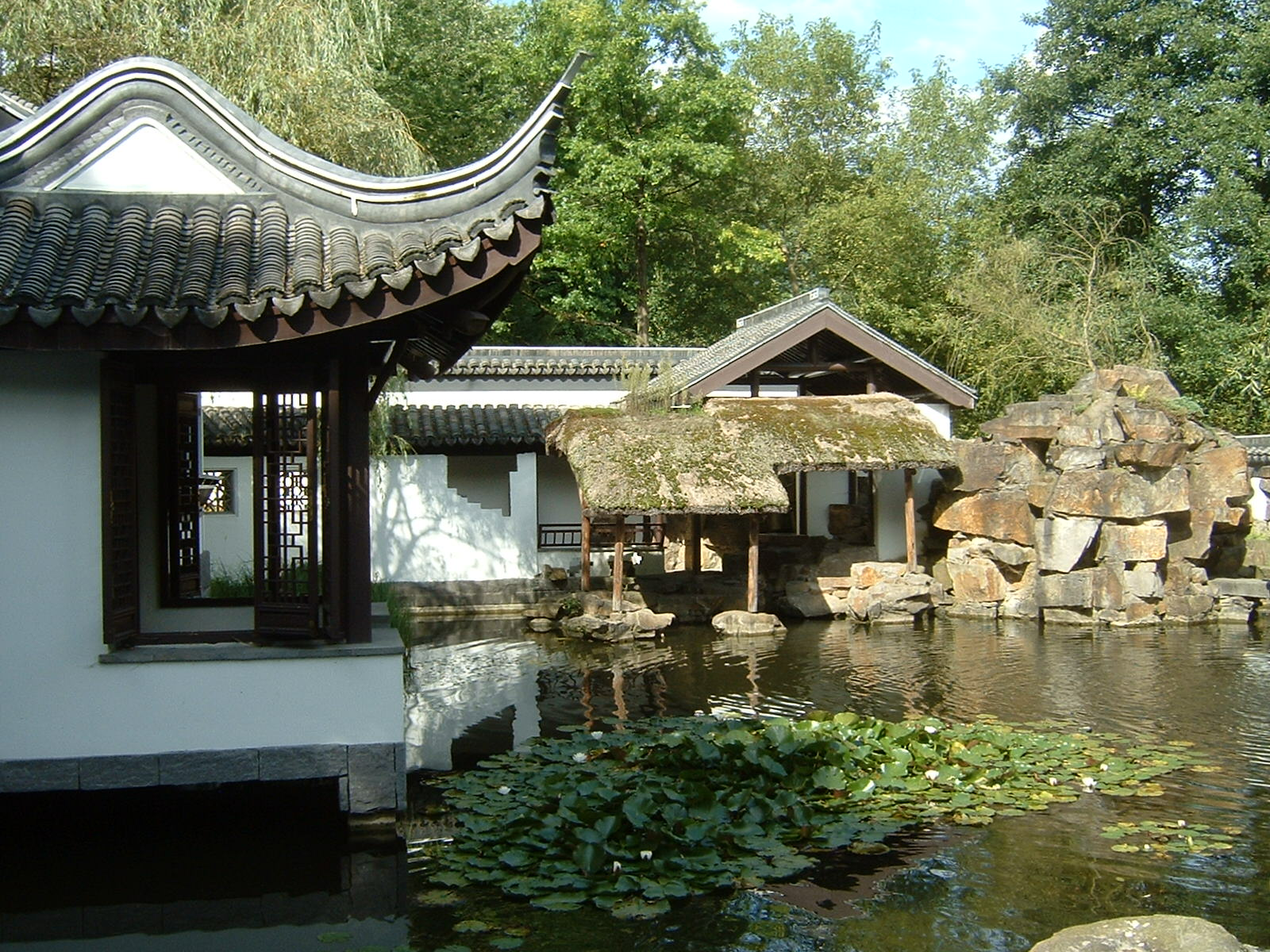
Chinese Garden of the Ruhr University in Bochum

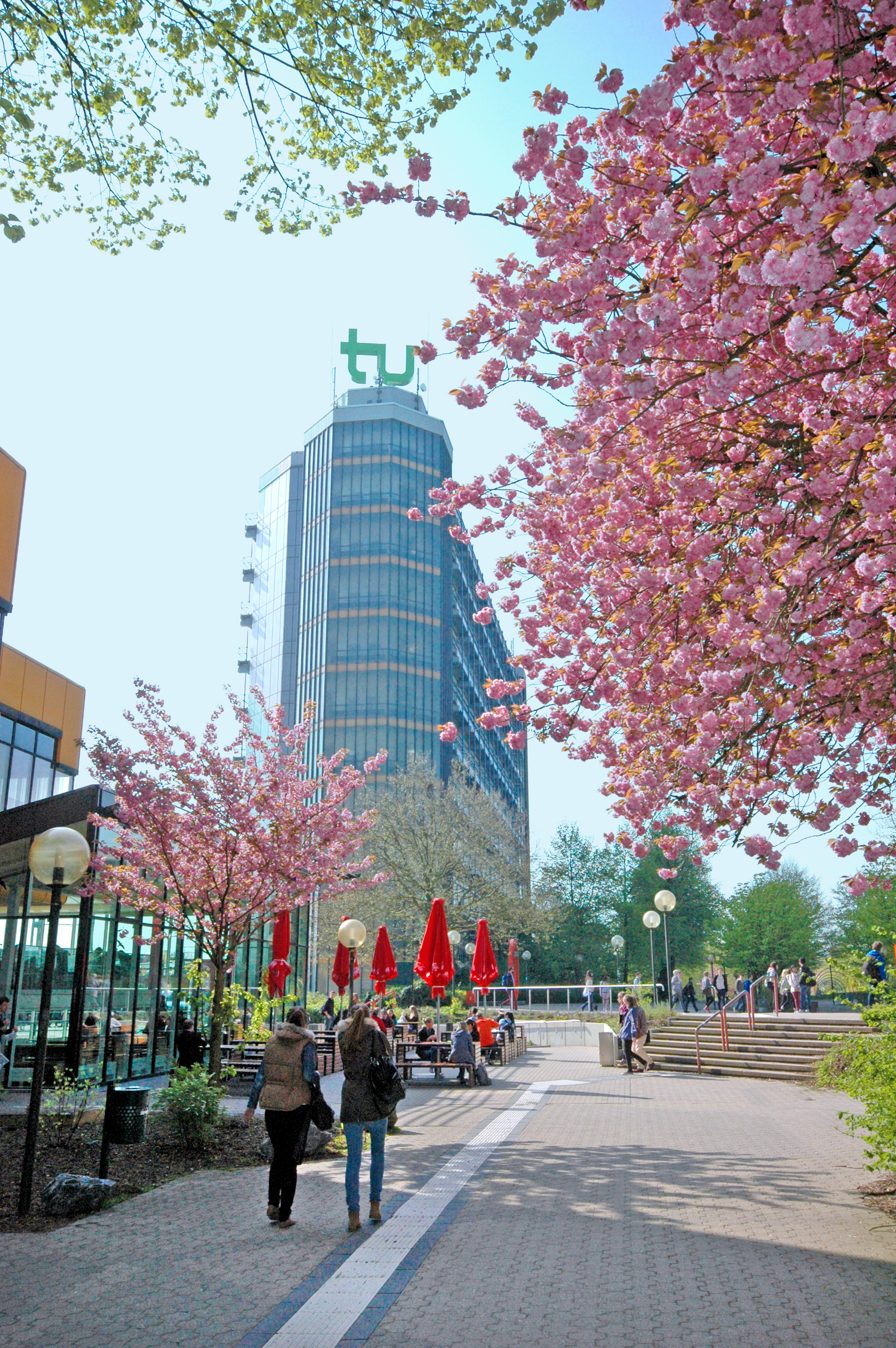
Dortmund University's Mathetower

With 22 universities and colleges and more than 250,000 students, the Ruhr region has the highest density of further education establishments anywhere in Germany. These include five universities alone in the cities of Bochum, Duisburg, Dortmund, Essen and Witten. In addition, Folkwang University of the Arts is an internationally acclaimed art college with its base in the Ruhr region. Furthermore, the universities are not the only places in the Ruhr region where academic qualifications can be obtained. There are 17 different universities of applied sciences which offer students to have the opportunity to undertake practice-relevant and qualified studies in various subjects, such as economics, logistics, administration or management.

=== Universities ===
The Ruhr area has 5 major universities in 6 cities with about 120,000 students.

- Ruhr University Bochum
- University of Duisburg-Essen
- Technical University of Dortmund
- Folkwang University of the Arts
- Witten/Herdecke University

==== UA Ruhr ====
The three largest universities (Ruhr University Bochum, TU Dortmund University, and the University of Duisburg-Essen) opened an alliance called "UA Ruhr". Students enrolled at one of the UA Ruhr universities can attend lectures and seminars at all three institutions without having to pay a visiting student fee. Consequently, they have many options to specialize in and to explore their chosen disciplines in depth. The UA Ruhr has three liaison offices for interested students in New York City, Moscow and São Paulo.

=== Universities of Applied Sciences and Arts ===
==== Bochum ====
- Bochum University of Applied Sciences (Hochschule Bochum, formerly Fachhochschule Bochum)
- Georg Agricola University of Applied Sciences (TH Georg Agricola)
- Protestant University of Applied Sciences, Rheinland-Westphalia-Lippe (Evangelische FH Rheinland-Westfalen-Lippe)
- Schauspielschule Bochum (Bochum drama school)
- College of the Federal Social Security, Department of Social Insurance for Miners, Railway Employees and Seafarers (Fachhochschule des Bundes der Sozialversicherung, Abteilung Knappschaft-Bahn-See)
- University of Health Sciences (Hochschule für Gesundheit)

==== Bottrop ====
- Hochschule Ruhr West

==== Dortmund ====
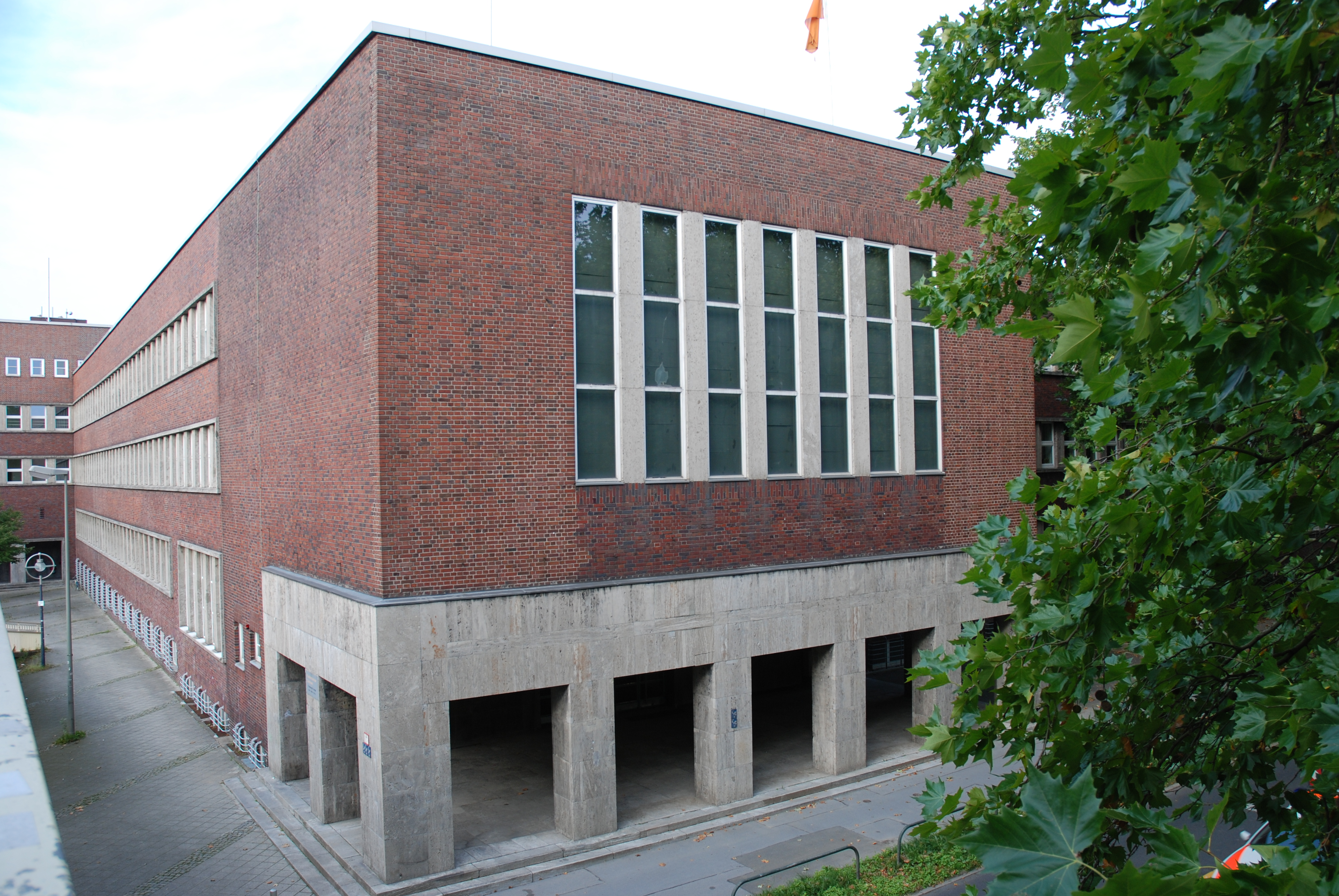
Dortmund University of Applied Sciences and Arts

- Fachhochschule Dortmund
- FOM Hochschule für Oekonomie & Management, Standort Dortmund (Academy for management)
- Fachhochschule für öffentliche Verwaltung Nordrhein-Westfalen (Academy for public administration)
- International School of Management (Private academy focussing on management and economics)
- IT-Center Dortmund (Private college)

==== Duisburg ====
- FOM Hochschule für Oekonomie und Management (Academy for management)
- Fachhochschule für öffentliche Verwaltung (Academy for public administration)

==== Essen ====
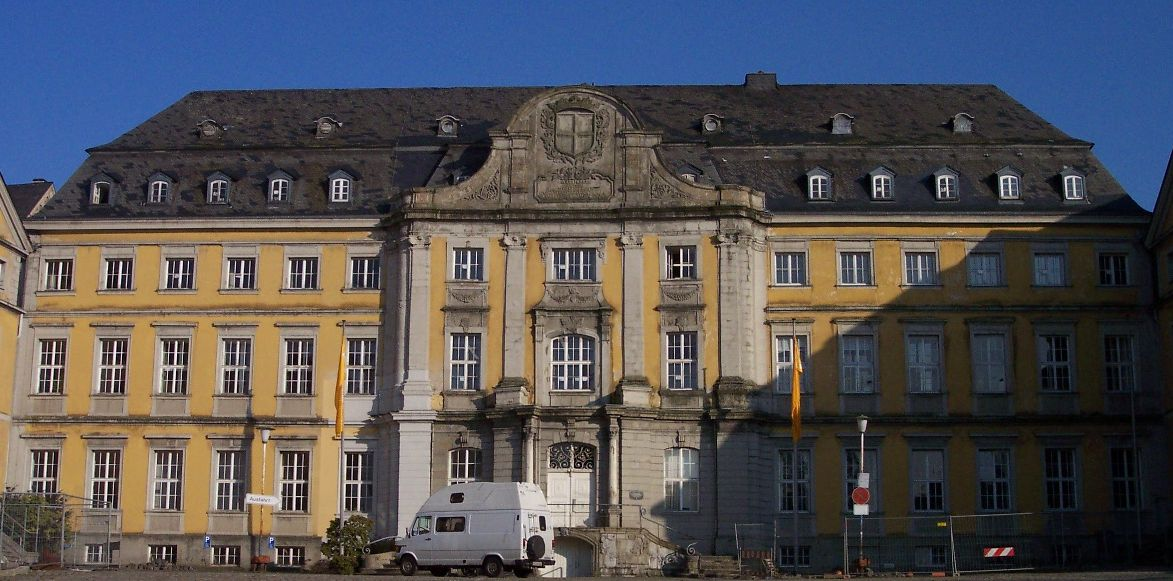
Main building of the Folkwang University in Essen-Werden

- FOM Hochschule für Oekonomie und Management
- Hochschule für bildende Künste
- Orchesterzentrum NRW

==== Gelsenkirchen ====
- Westfälische Hochschule
- Fachhochschule für öffentliche Verwaltung NRW (Academy for public administration)

==== Hagen ====
- University of Hagen
- FOM Hochschule für Oekonomie und Management
- Fachhochschule für öffentliche Verwaltung (Academy for public administration)
- South Westphalia University of Applied Sciences

==== Hamm ====
- SRH Hochschule für Logistik und Wirtschaft
- Hochschule Hamm-Lippstadt

==== Kamp-Lintfort ====
- Rhine-Waal University of Applied Sciences

==== Mülheim an der Ruhr ====
- Hochschule Ruhr West
- Fachhochschule für öffentliche Verwaltung NRW (Academy for public administration)

==== Recklinghausen ====
- Westfälische Hochschule

==== Unna ====
- Hochschule Campus Unna

== Transport ==
=== Public transport ===
With the exception of public transport companies serving Hamm and Kreis Unna, all such companies in the Ruhr region are run under the umbrella of the Verkehrsverbund Rhein-Ruhr, which provides a uniform ticket system valid for the entire area. The Ruhr region is well-integrated into the national rail system, the Deutsche Bahn, for both passenger and goods services, each city in the region has at least one train station. The bigger central stations have hourly direct connections to the bigger European cities as Amsterdam, Brussels, Paris, Vienna or Zürich.

The Ruhr area also contains the longest tram system in the world, with tram and Stadtbahn services from Witten to Krefeld as well as the Rhine-Ruhr S-Bahn network. Originally the system was even bigger, it was possible to travel from Unna to Bad Honnef without using railway or bus services.

=== Road transport ===
The Ruhr has one of the densest motorway networks in all of Europe, with dozens of Autobahns and similar Schnellstraßen (expressways) crossing the region. The Autobahn network is built in a grid network, with four east–west (A2, A40, A42, A44) and seven north–south (A1, A3, A43, A45, A52, A57, A59) routes. The A1, A2 and A3 are mostly used by through traffic, while the other autobahns have a more regional function.

Both the A44 and the A52 have several missing links, in various stages of planning. Some missing sections are currently in construction or planned to be constructed in the near future.

Additional expressways serve as bypasses and local routes, especially around Dortmund and Bochum. Due to the density of the autobahns and expressways, Bundesstraßen are less important for intercity traffic. The first Autobahns in the Ruhr opened during the mid-1930s. Due to the density of the network, and the number of alternative routes, traffic volumes are generally lower than other major metropolitan areas in Europe. Traffic congestion is an everyday occurrence, but far less so than in the Randstad in the Netherlands, another polycentric urban area. Most important Autobahns have six lanes, but there are no eight-lane Autobahns in the Ruhr.

=== Air transport ===
Düsseldorf Airport is the intercontinental airport for North Rhine-Westphalia and is within 20 km of most of the Western Ruhr area. It is served by the Düsseldorf Flughafen and Düsseldorf Flughafen Terminal railway stations, with its several parking lots, terminals and stations being connected by the Skytrain.

Dortmund Airport in the Eastern Ruhr is a mid-sized airport, offering scheduled flights to domestic and European destinations and its approximately 3 million passengers in 2023. Dortmund Airport is served by an express bus to Dortmund main station, a shuttle bus to the nearby railway station Holzwickede/Dortmund Flughafen, a bus connecting to Stadtbahn line U47, as well as a bus to the city of Unna.

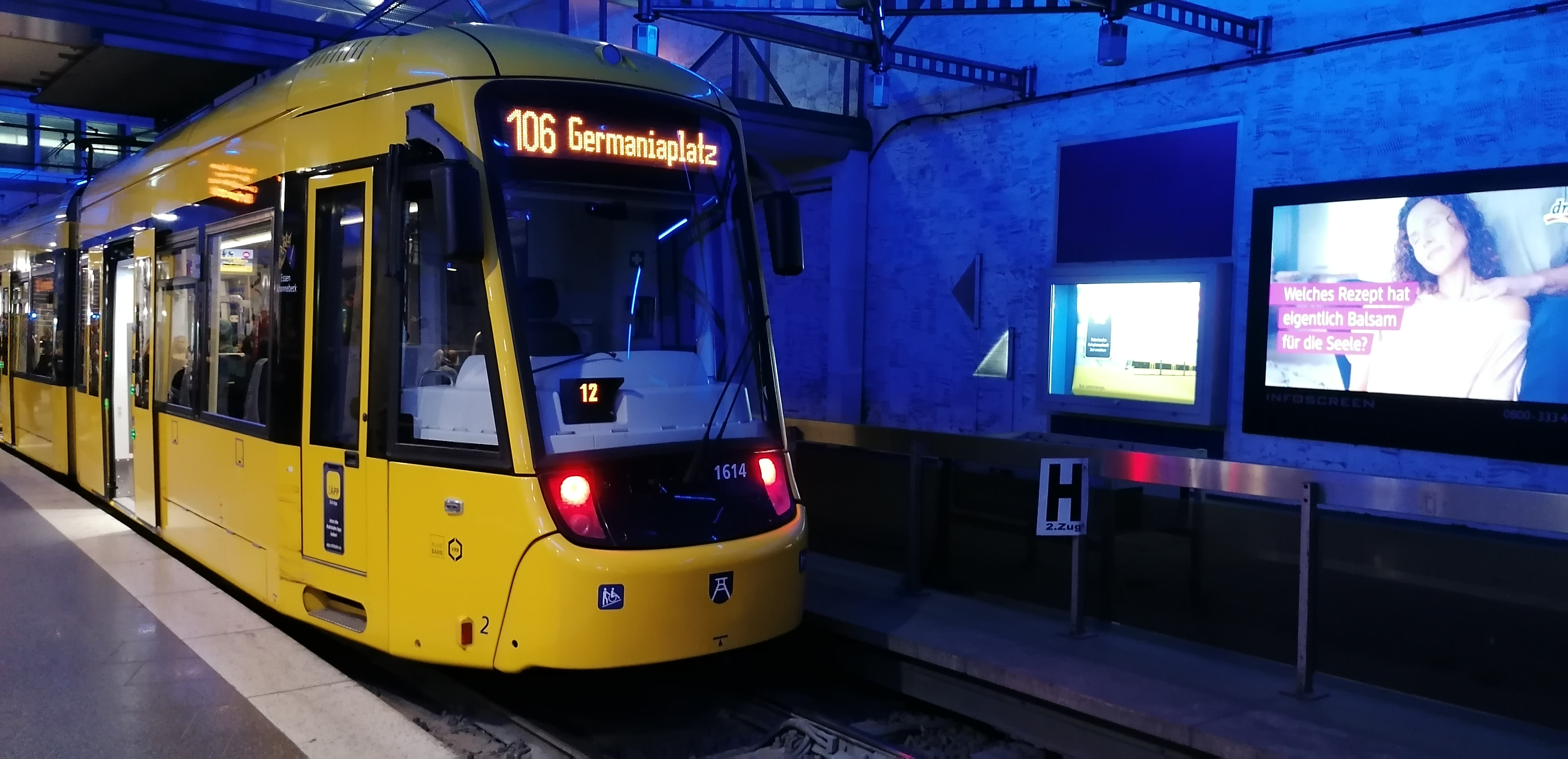
A tram of the Rhine-Ruhr Stadtbahn

Public transport map Rhein-Ruhr

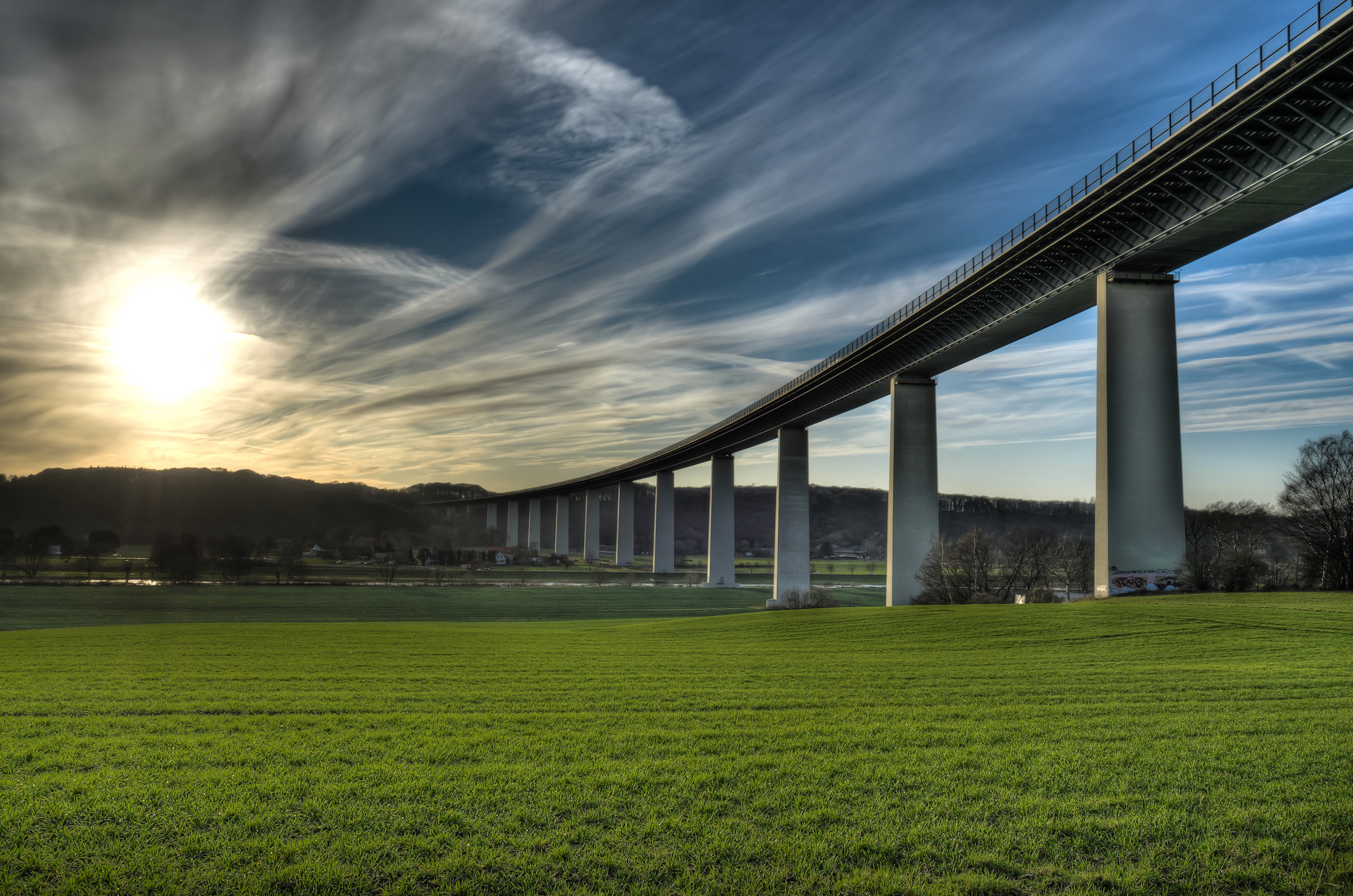
Bundesautobahn 52 in Mülheim

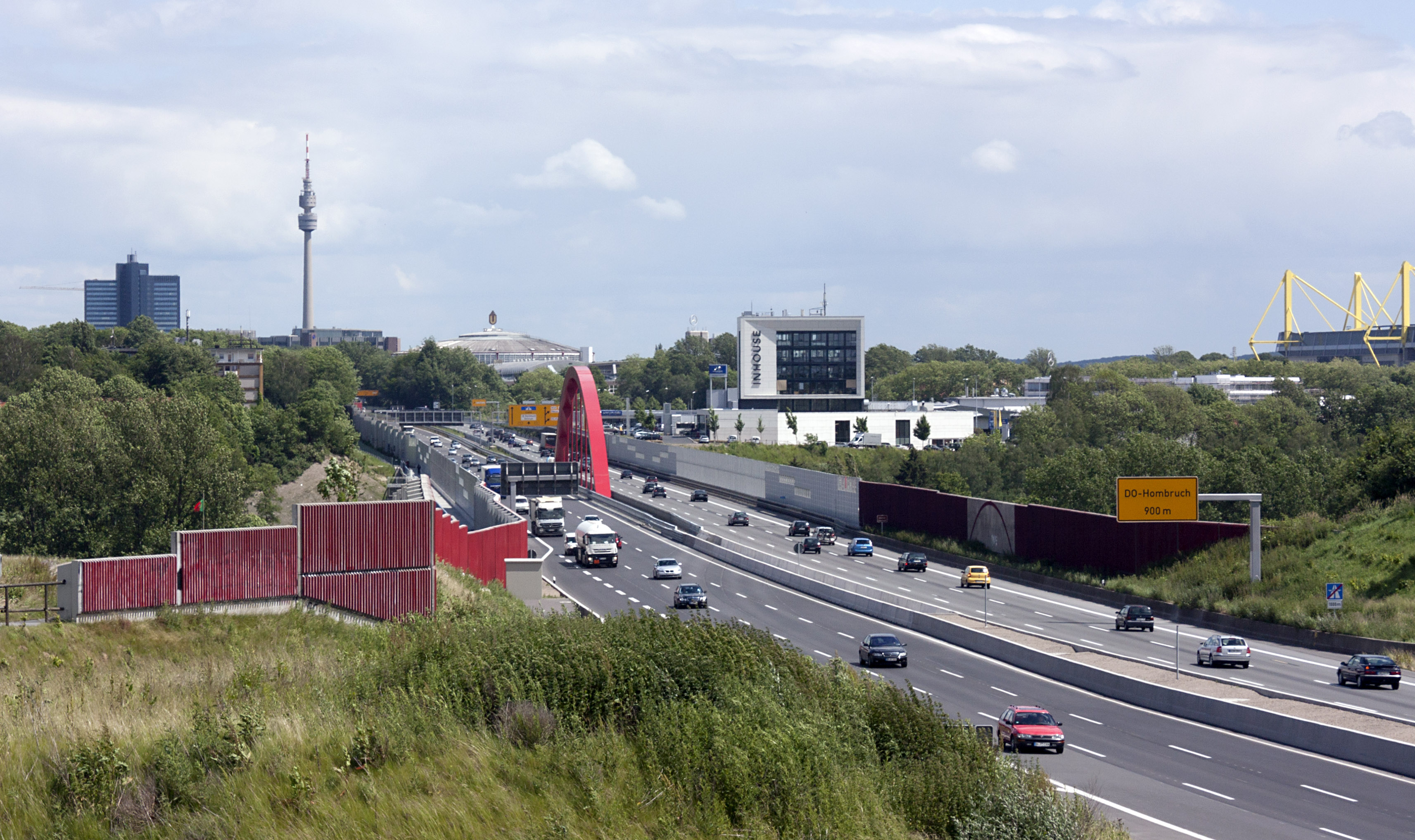
A40 motorway in Dortmund

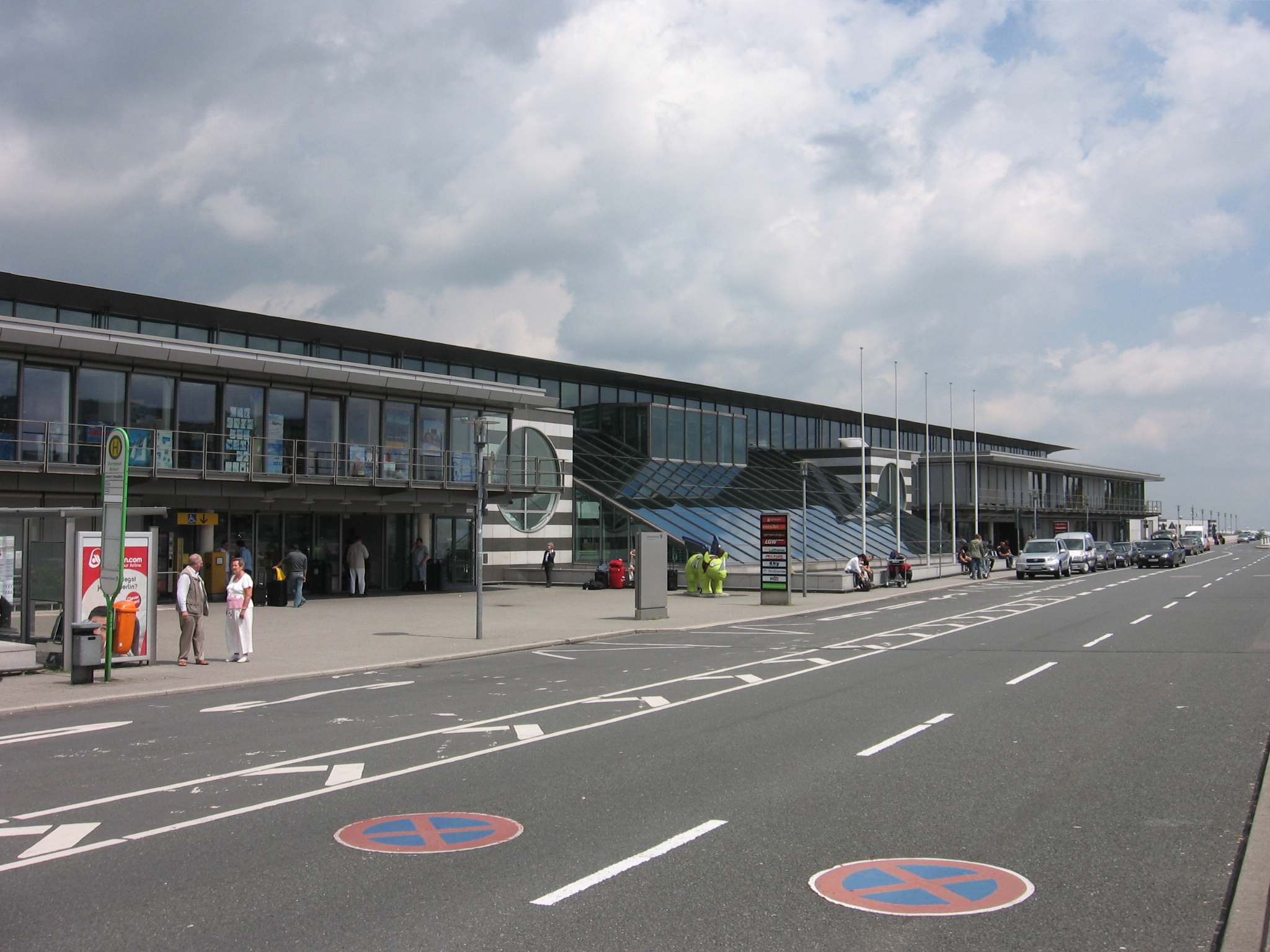
Dortmund Airport in the East of the Ruhr

== See also ==
- Metropolitan regions in Germany
- Occupation of the Ruhr (1923–1925)
- Rhine-Ruhr Metropolitan Region
- Ruhr pocket
- Ruhrpolen
- Katowice urban area
- Metropolis GZM
- Upper Silesian Coal Basin

== General and cited sources ==
- Botting, Douglas (1985), From the Ruins of the Reich: Germany 1945–1949, New York: Crown Publishing, ISBN 978-0-517-55865-2
- Dickinson, Robert E. (1945), The Regions of Germany, vol. 7, London: Routledge, p. 70
- French Directorate for Economic Affairs (8 September 1945), Memorandum on the separation of the German industrial regions
- Gareau, Frederick H. (June 1961), "Morgenthau's Plan for Industrial Disarmament in Germany", Western Political Quarterly, 14 (2): 517–53, doi:10.2307/443604, JSTOR 443604
- GI staff (1966), German International, vol. 10, p. 30
- Osmańczyk, Edmund Jan; Mango, Anthony (2003), Encyclopedia of the United Nations and International Agreements: A to F, p. 1970
- Lane, Kathryn (2001), Germany: The Land, p. 24
- Levine, Alan J (1992), "Second Battle of the Ruhr", The Strategic Bombing of Germany: 1940–1945 (illustrated ed.), Greenwood Publishing Group, pp. 172–174, ISBN 9780275943196
- Yoder, Amos (July 1955), "The Ruhr Authority and the German Problem", Review of Politics, 17 (3): 345–358, doi:10.1017/s0034670500014261, JSTOR 1404797, S2CID 145465919
