= Halde Rheinpreußen =

Coordinates: 51°28′42.68″N 6°39′0.81″E

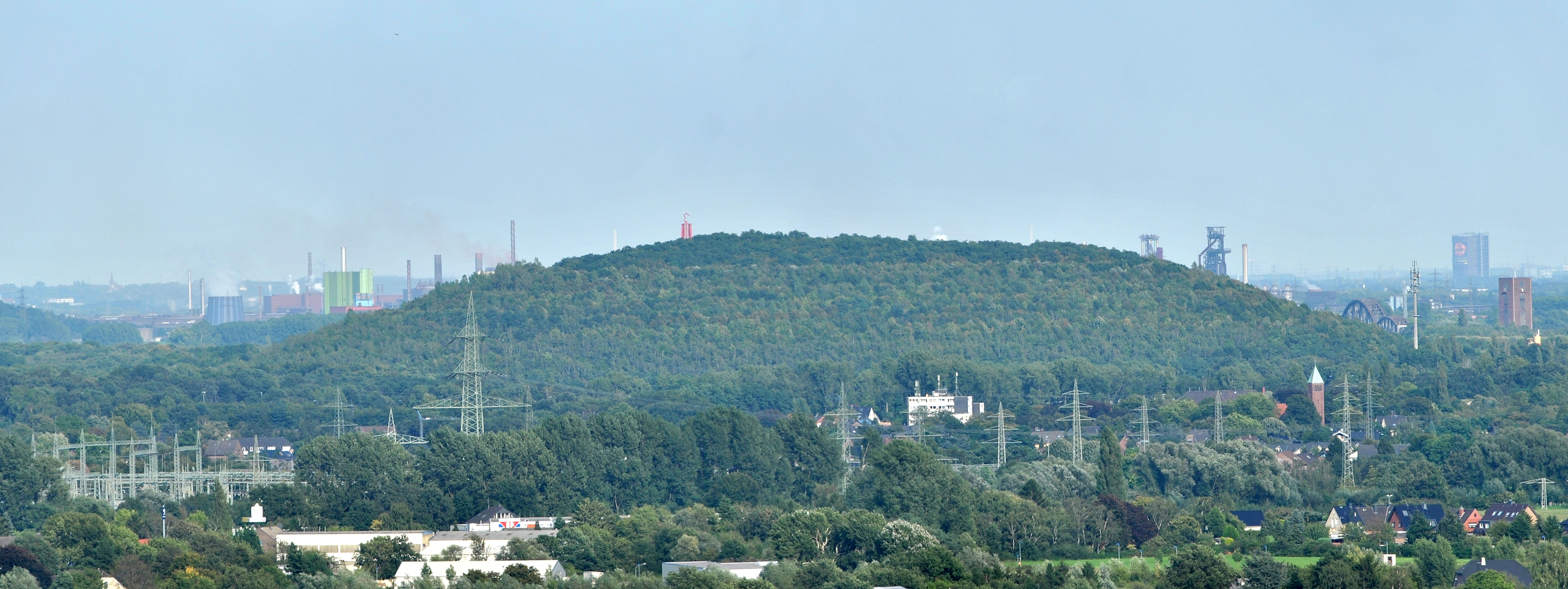
General view

The Halde Rheinpreußen is a spoil tip in the German city Moers which lies 70 metres (230 ft) above its ambit. It is part of the category Panoramas of the Ruhr Industrial Heritage Trail.

In 1963, the spoil tip was heaped up with materials of the pit 5/9, i.e. the mine Zeche Rheinpreußen.

In autumn 1999, the artist Otto Piene, co-founder of the ZERO group, presented his idea of a mining lamp memorial called Geleucht for the first time. Between 2005 and 2006, 35 lamp poles were assembled on the spoil tip for red illumination of an area of 8,000 square centimetres (1,200 sq in). In 2007, the circa 28-metre-high (92 ft) and 115-tonne (113-long-ton; 127-short-ton) landmark was constructed on the Halde Rheinpreußen.

Since the dedication of the Geleucht on 17 September 2007, the mining lamp memorial and the lamp poles are illuminated every night. The stairs to the observation deck are opened on a regular basis.

== Gallery ==
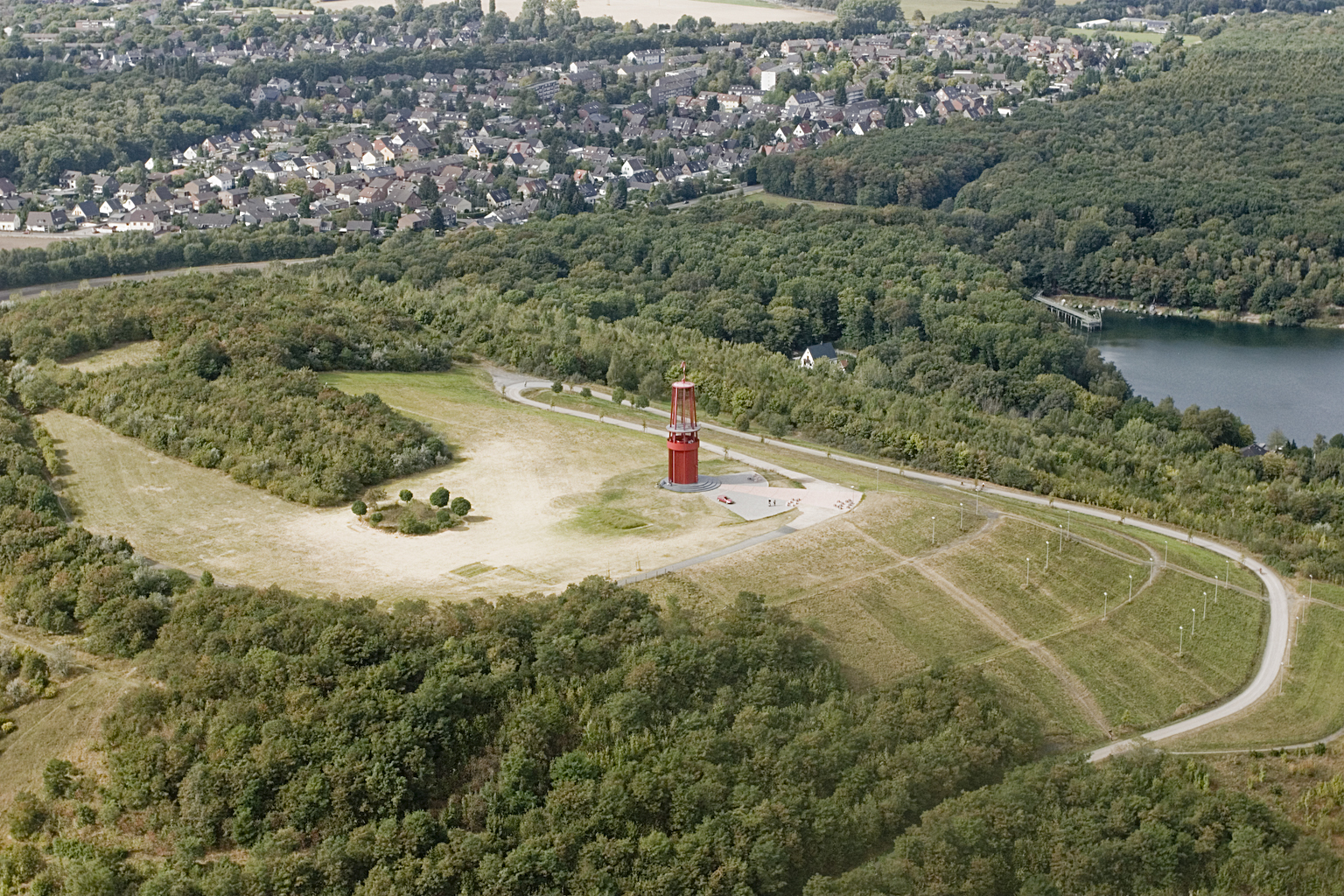
Aerial photograph

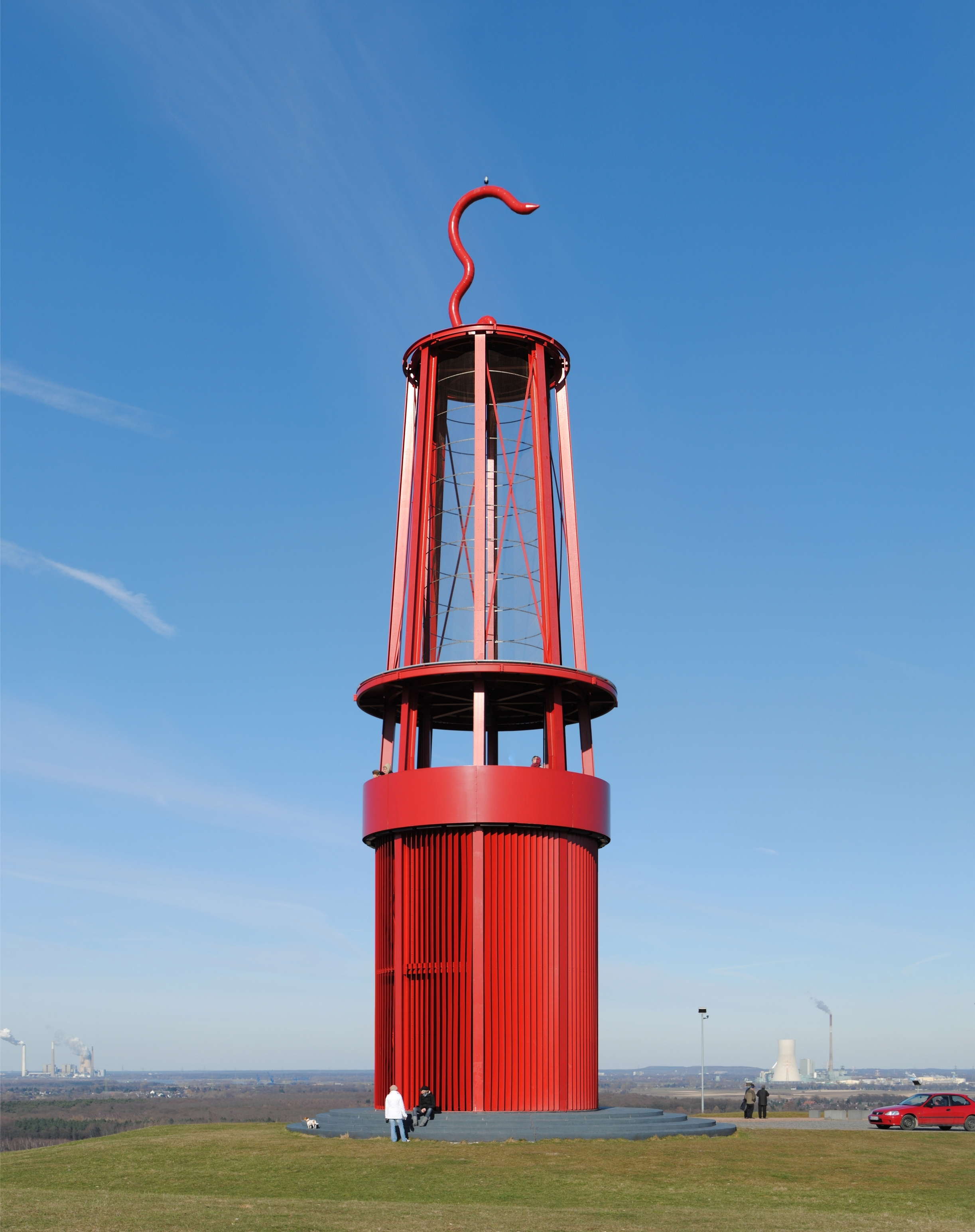
The mining lamp memorial at day...

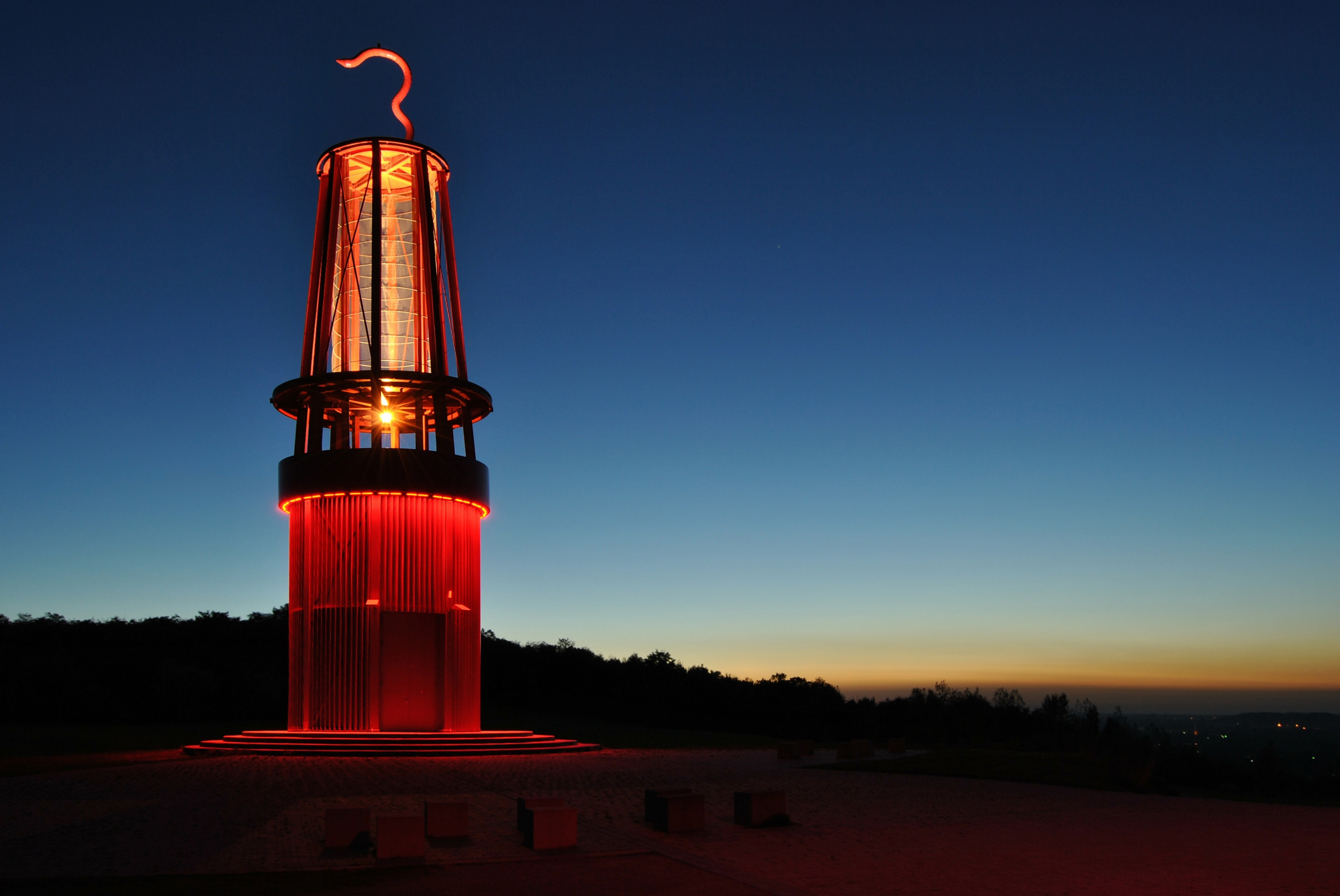
...and illuminated during the blue hour

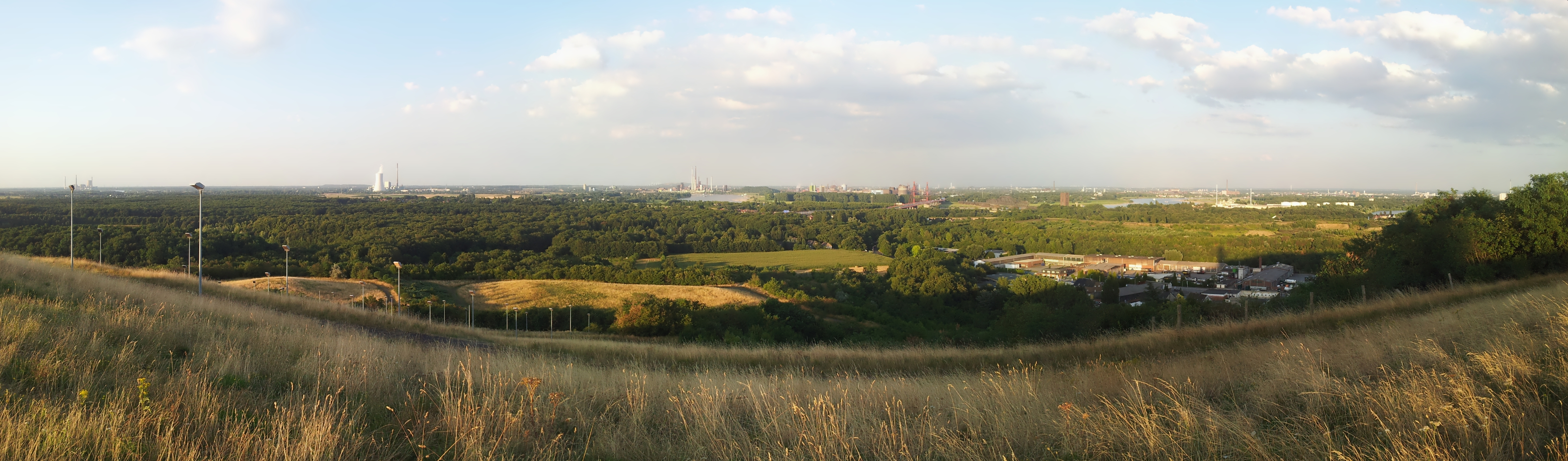
