= Industrial Heritage Trail =

Network of tourist attractions in and around the Ruhr Area, Germany

Instruction plate of the main trail

The Industrial Heritage Trail (German: Route der Industriekultur) links tourist attractions related to the industrial heritage in the Ruhr area in Germany. It is a part of the European Route of Industrial Heritage. The series of routes were developed between 1989 and 1999, however additions are still being made.

== The route ==
The trail network connects museums and exhibitions that present the industrial revolution during the last 750 years in the Ruhr area. It includes 400 km of road network and about 700 km of bicycle tracks.

== The attractions ==
There are 52 main attractions on the trail.

- Bochum Dahlhausen Railway Museum
- German Inland Waterways Museum
- Villa Hügel
- Zeche Carl

== Visitor centres and anchor points ==
- German Inland Waterways Museum
- Duisburg Inner Harbour
- Oberhausen Industrial Museum
- Landschaftspark Duisburg-Nord
- Gasometer Oberhausen
- Aquarius Water Museum
- Villa Hügel
- Nordsternpark
- World Heritage Site Zeche Zollverein
- Marl Chemical Park
- Bochum Dahlhausen Railway Museum
- Henrichshütte
- Centennial Hall Bochum
- Recklinghausen Substation
- German Mining Museum
- Zeche Nachtigall
- Henrichenburg boat lift
- German Occupational Safety Exhibition (DASA)
- Hansa Coking Plant
- Zeche Zollern II/IV
- Hohenhof
- Hagen Open-air Museum
- Lindenbrauerei Unna
- Maximilianpark Hamm
- Halde Rheinpreußen

== Theme routes ==
1. Duisburg: Town and Harbour
2. Zollverein Industrial Landscape
3. Duisburg: Industrial Culture on the Rhine
4. Oberhausen: Industry makes the Town
5. Krupp and the Town of Essen
6. Dortmund: Dreiklang Coal, Steel and Bier
7. Industrial Culture on the Lippe
8. Erzbahn-Emscherbruch
9. Industrial Culture at Volme and Ennepe
10. Brine, Steam and Coal
11. Early Industrialisation
12. The History and the Present of the Ruhr
13. On the Way to the Blue Emscher
14. Canals and Shipping
15. Railways in the Area
16. Westphalia Mining Route
17. Rhenish Mining Route
18. Chemistry, Glass and Energy
19. Workers' Settlements
20. Entrepreneurial Villas
21. Bread, Grain and Beer
22. Myth of the Ruhr Region
23. Historic Parks and Gardens
24. Industry/Nature
25. Panoramas and Landmarks
26. Sacred Buildings
27. Iron and Steel
28. Water: Works, Towers and Turbines
29. Bochum: Industrial Culture in the Heart of the Region
30. Ruhr Industrial Heritage Trail – Gelsenkirchen (in preparation)

Ruhr Industrial Heritage Trail by bike

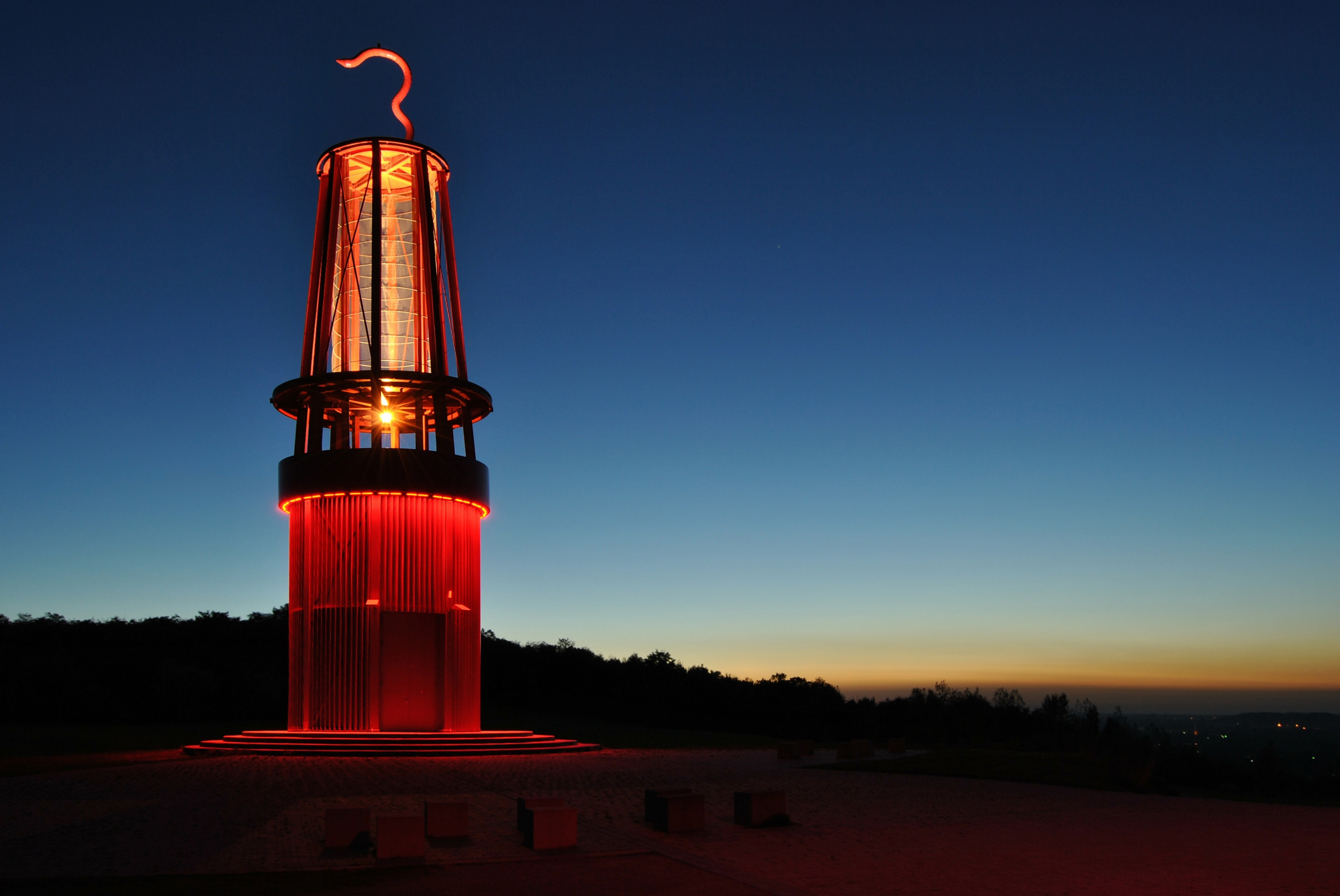
In the category Panoramas are many spoil tips, e.g. here the Halde Rheinpreußen

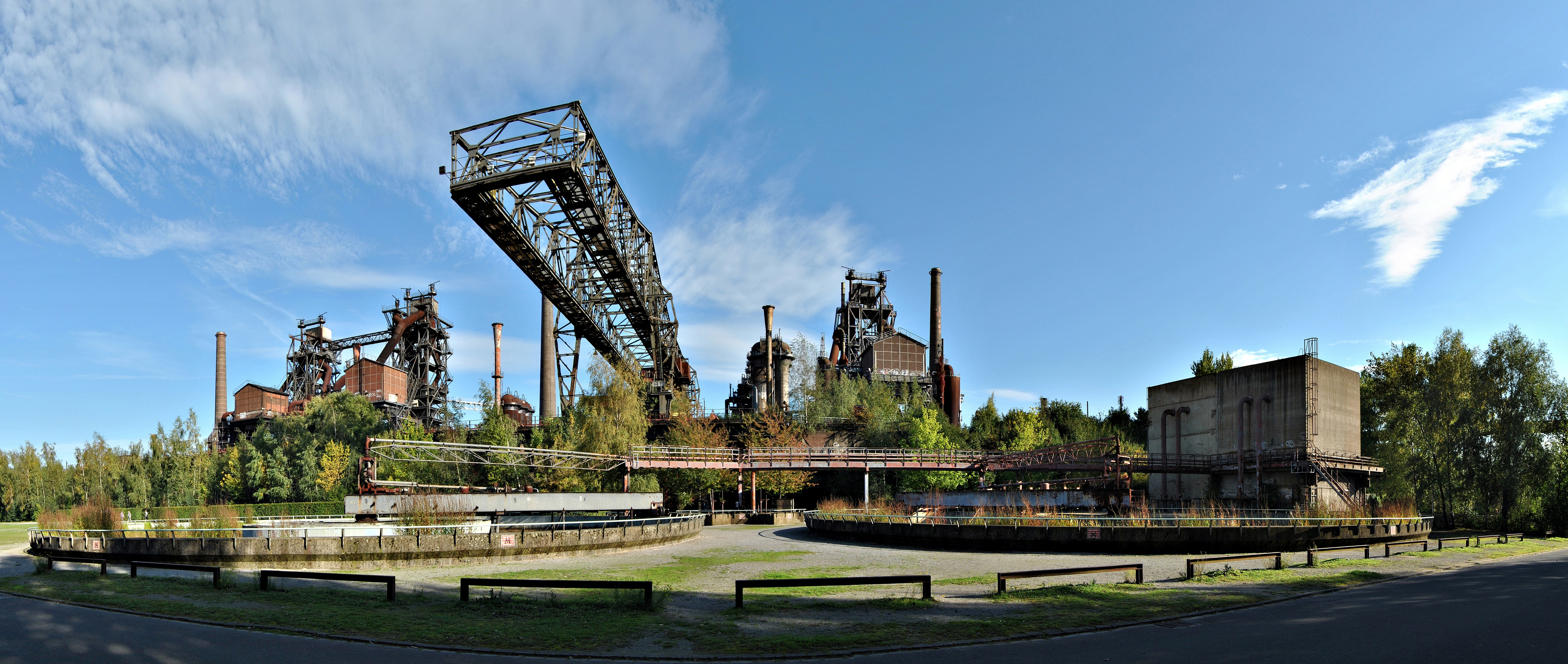
Landschaftspark Duisburg-Nord

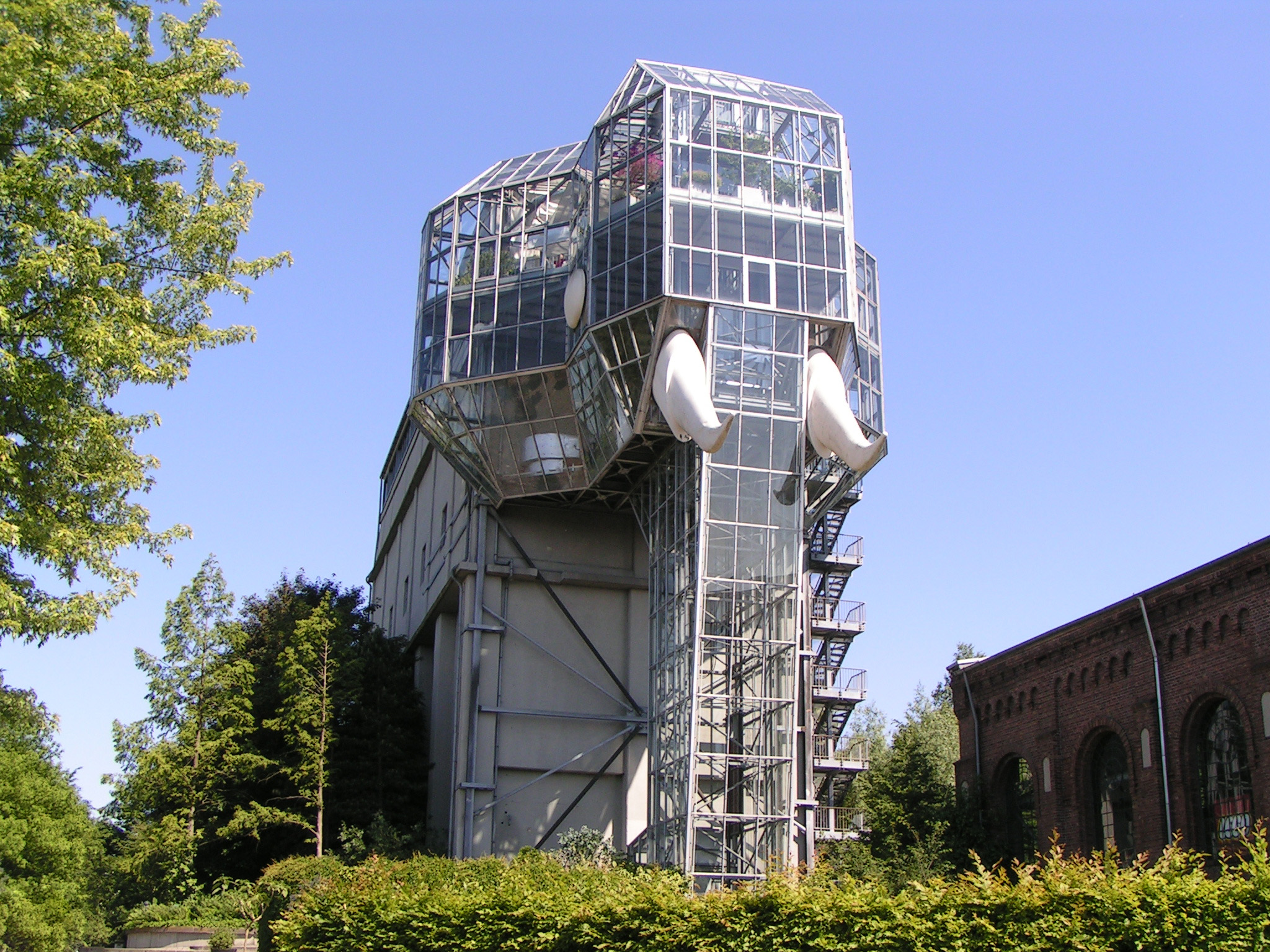
The glass elephant in Hamm

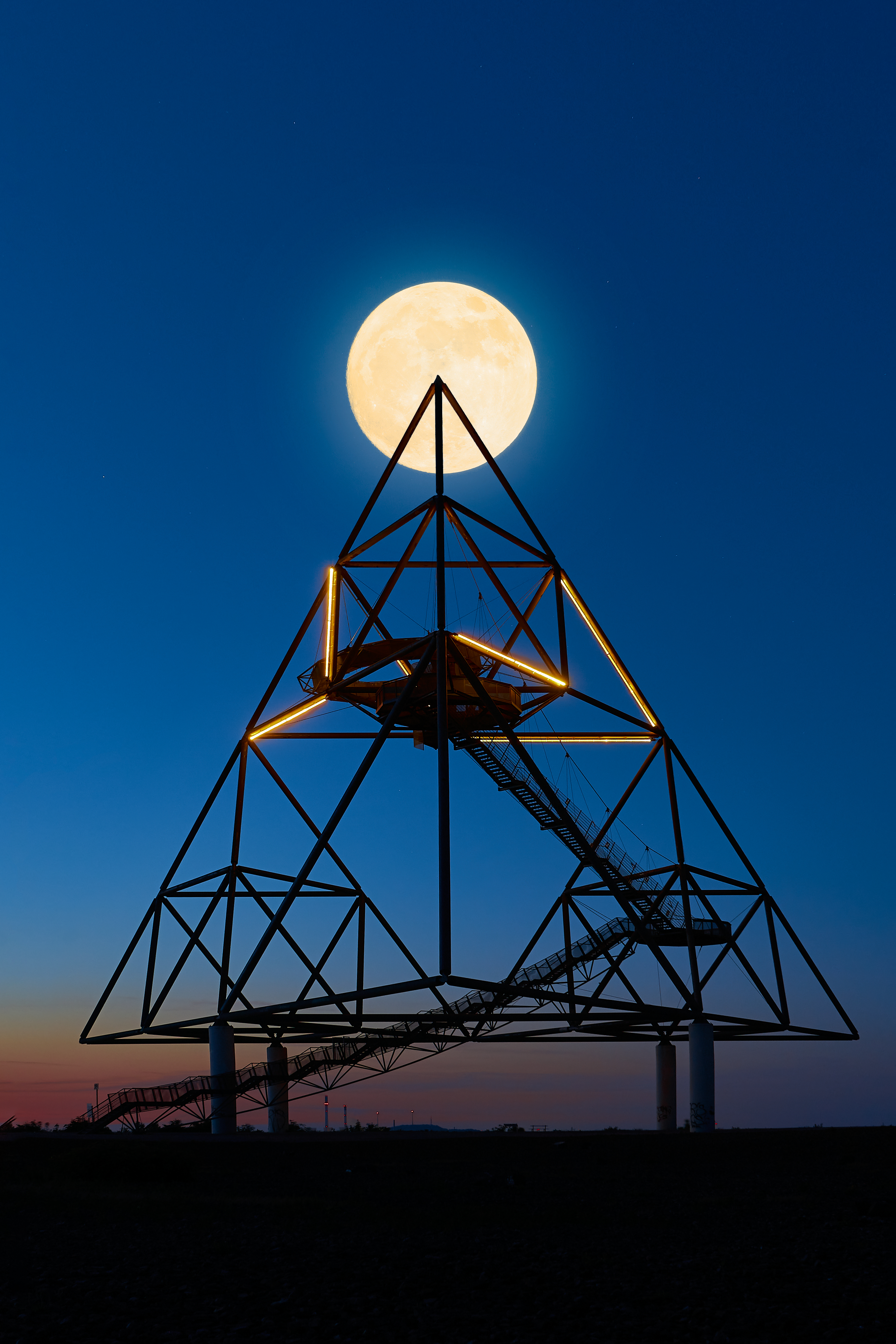
Tetrahedron in Bottrop

== See also ==
- History of the Ruhr District
