= Duisburg: Industrial Culture on the Rhine =

Duisburg: Industrial culture on the Rhine is the third theme route of the Industrial Heritage Trail.
