= German Inland Waterways Museum =

Coordinates: 51°27′36″N 6°43′48″E

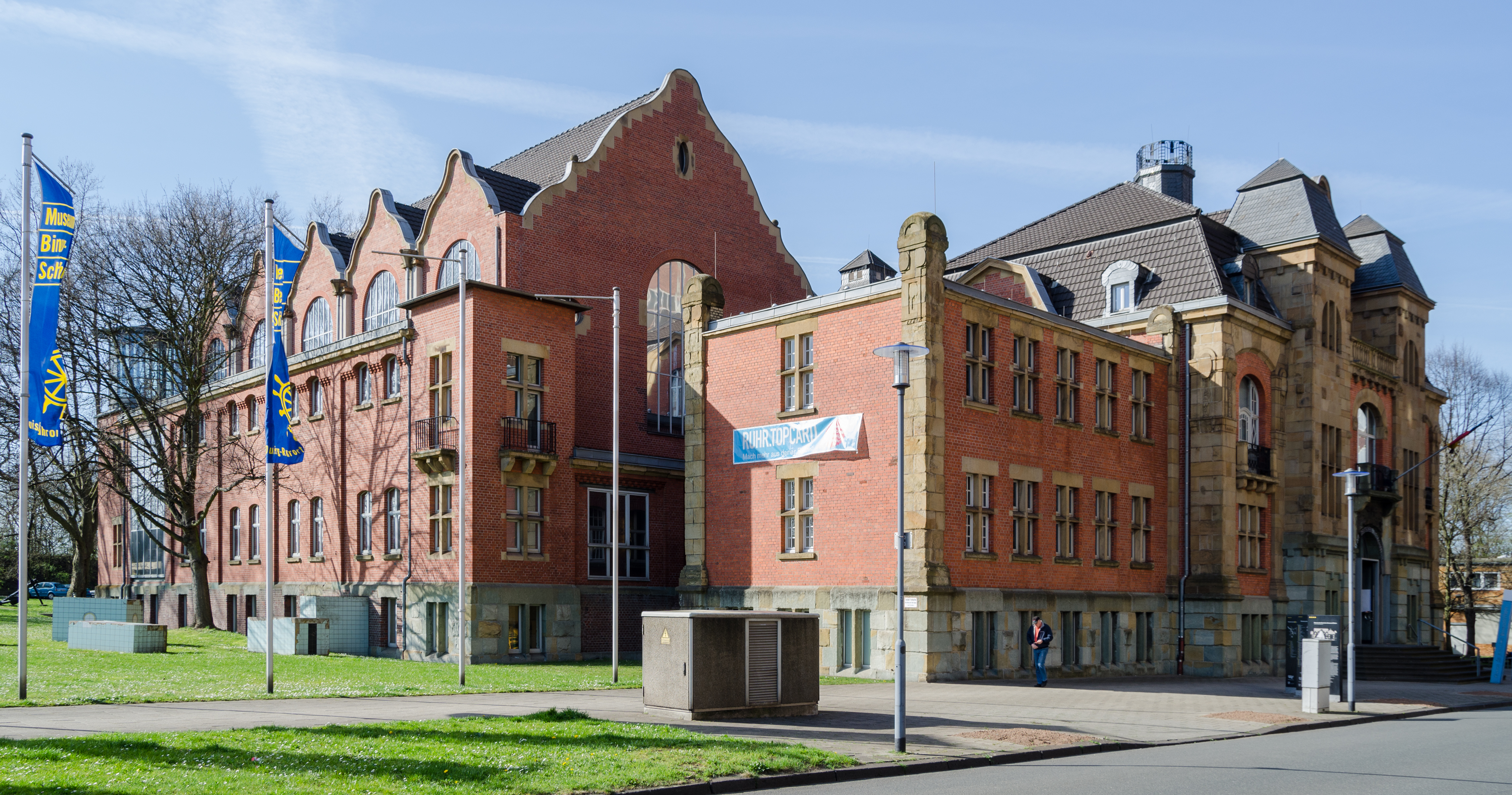
Former swimming baths which now houses the museum

German Inland Waterways Museum, Duisburg, North Rhine-Westphalia

Ruhr Industrial Heritage Trail

The German Inland Waterways Museum (German: Museum der Deutschen Binnenschifffahrt) is located in Ruhrort, Duisburg at the nucleus of Duisburg-Ruhrorter ports, which today make up the largest European inland harbour complex.

The museum was founded in 1974 with the purchase of the museum ship Oscar Huber. In 1998 the museum was moved from the old town hall into the city's former indoor swimming facility, an Art Nouveau landmark which had been built in 1910, closed in 1986, and declared a protected historic site in 1988. The move allowed the museum the space to exhibit complete ships, as well as spurring redevelopment in the harbor area. The building conversion was designed by Architektur Fabrik Aachen (afa) and an American artist, Ron Bernstein, and made very little change to the building exterior while expanding the inner spaces to accommodate the exhibits. For example, a full-size sailing ship now occupies the former men's pool, while the second-story women's pool now houses a reconstructed barge.
