= Duisburg: Town and Harbour =

Coordinates: 51.435147°N 6.762692°E

Duisburg: Town and Harbour is the Theme Route No. 1 of the Industrial Heritage Trail, which passes through Duisburg, the Inner Harbour, Ruhrort, the Duisburg-Ruhrorter harbour and other attractions on the Rhine and Ruhr. These trails were first developed between 1989 and 1999.

== History ==
The concept of grouping together legacy industrial sites to assist and enable them with marketing was developed by North Rhine Westphalia between 1995 and 1999. It came together with partners from Great Britain, the Netherlands and Belgian to apply for Interreg IIC money to develop the idea of the European Route of Industrial Heritageusing test routes in the four countries. In 2001 they produced a report showing the possible structure. The report concluded with the Duisburg Declaration.

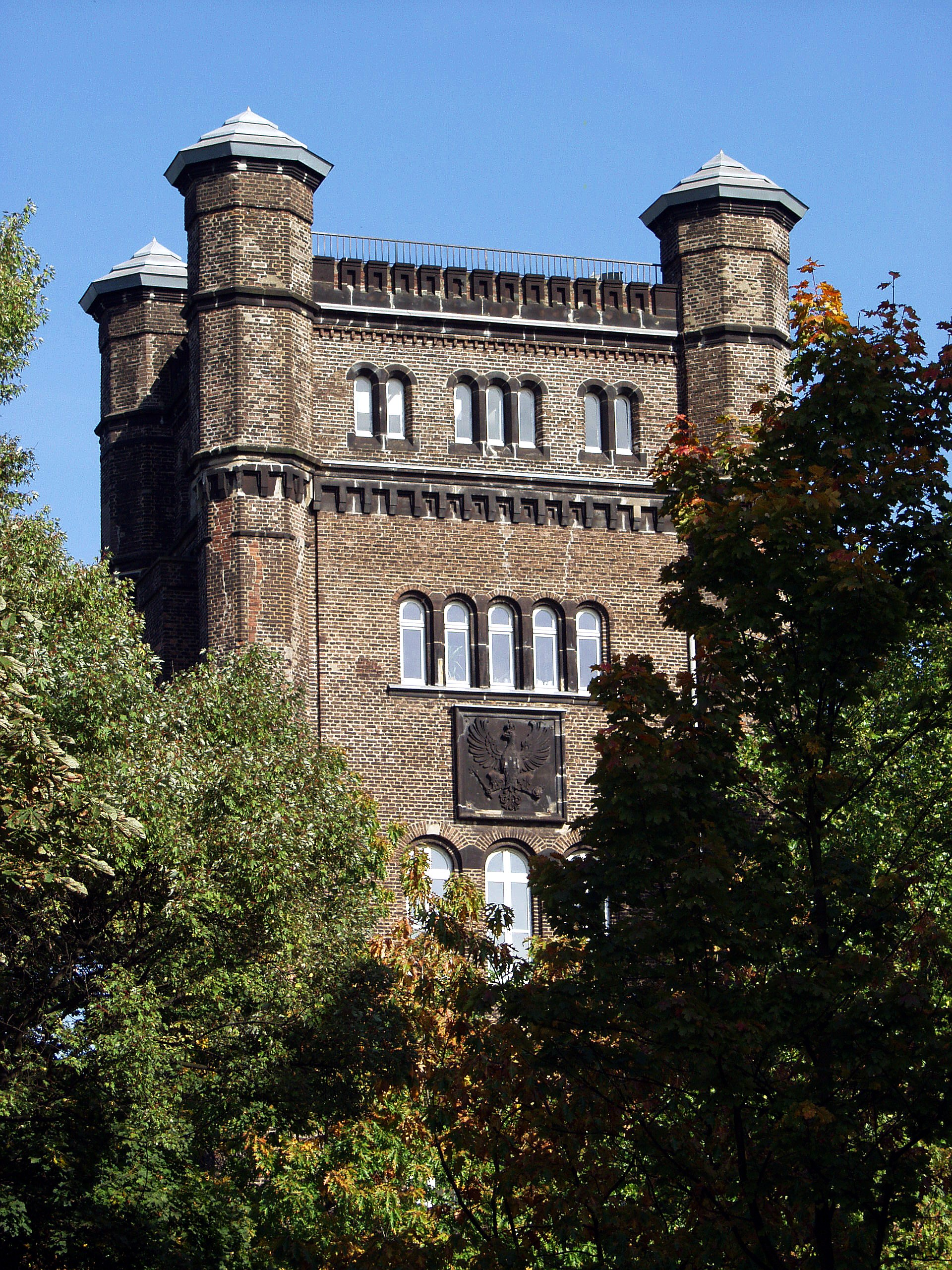
Trajekt-Hebeturm Homberg

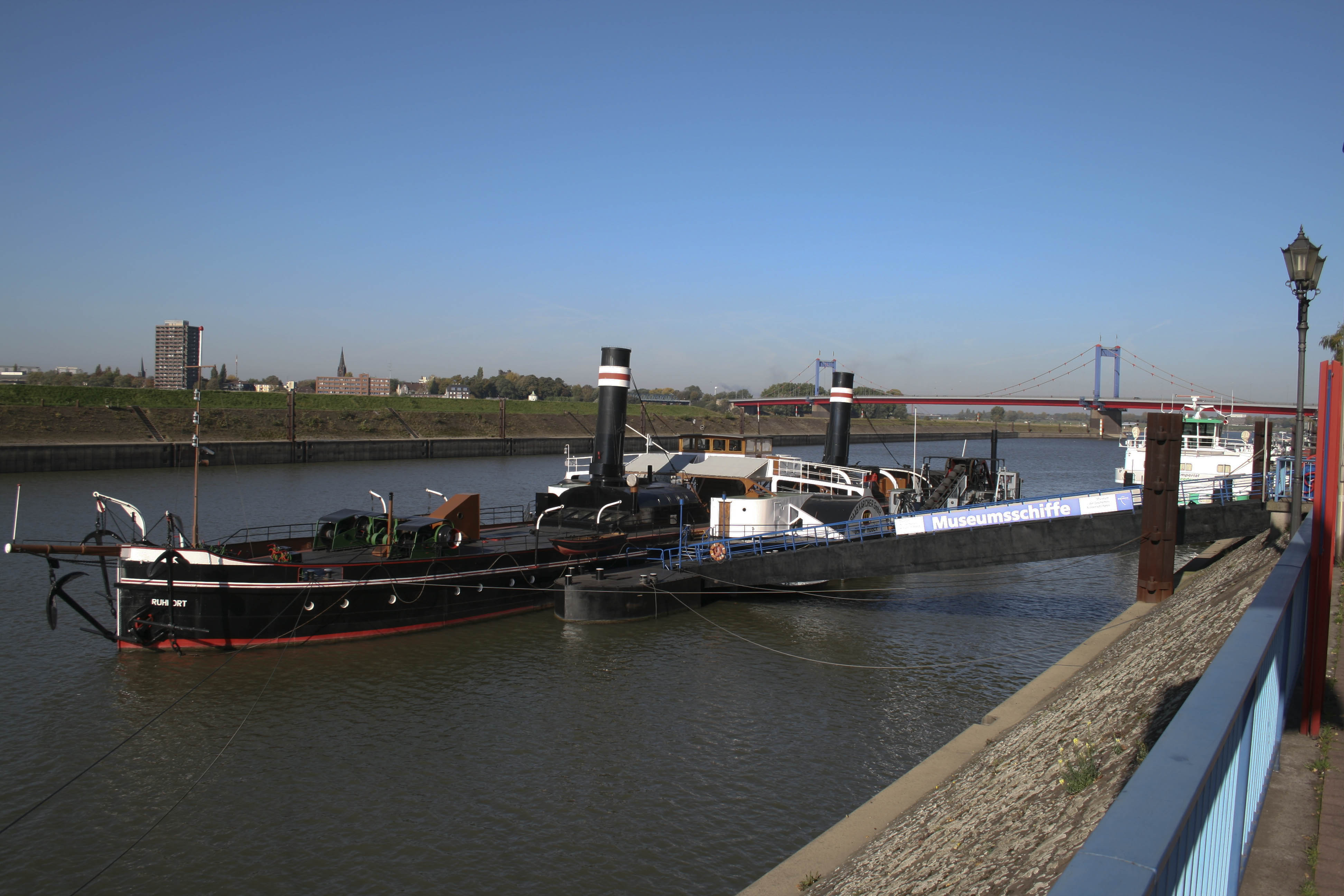
Oscar Huber, a museum ship in the Deutschen Binnenschifffahrtsmuseums

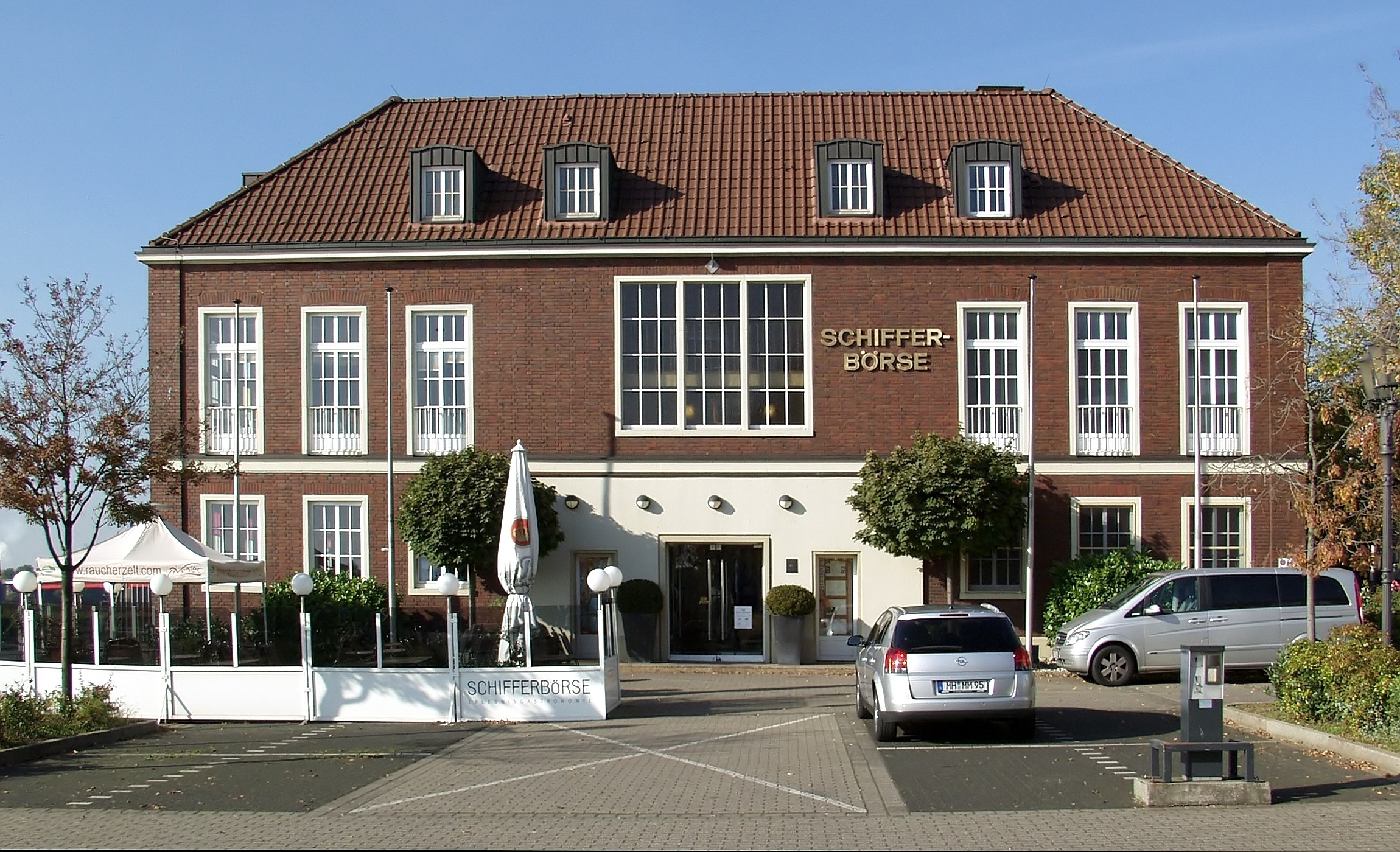
Schifferbörse (Ship Exchange)

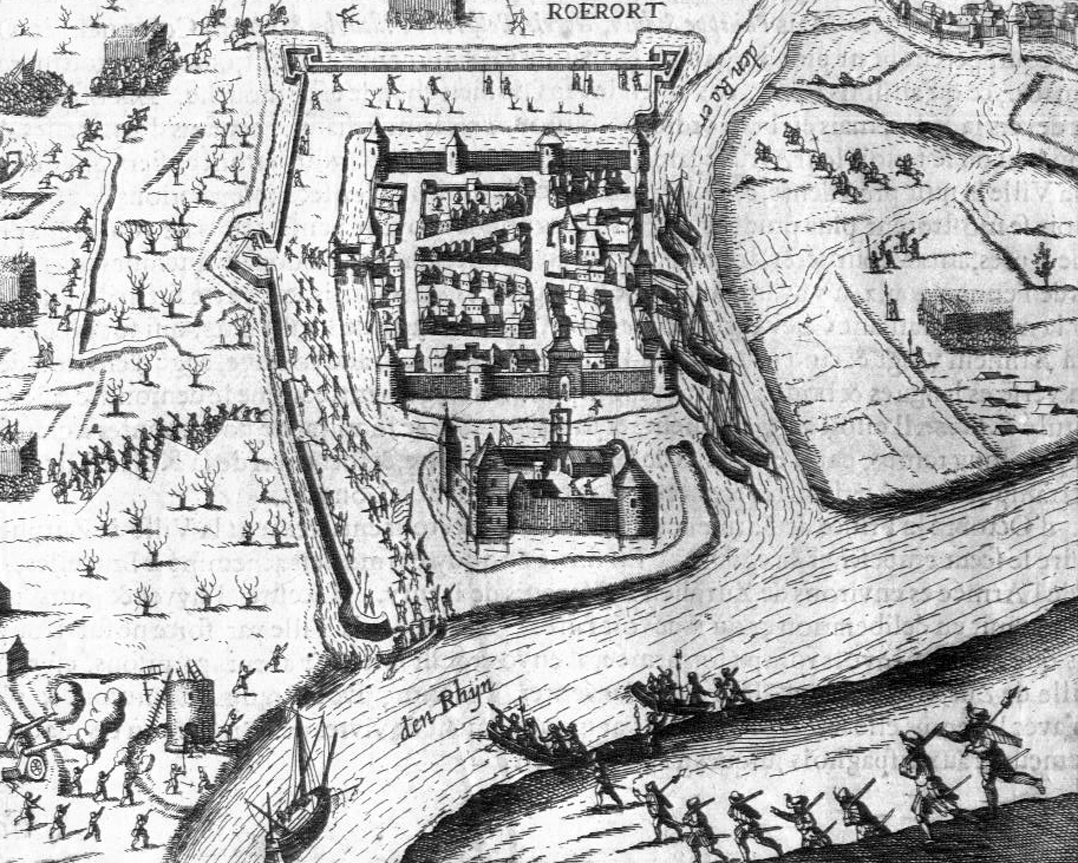
Ruhrorter Kastell im Jahre 1587

The first heritage trail starts in the Inner Harbour of Duisburg and finishes at the lock at Meiderich. The second centres on the Rhine Ruhrort harbours. The Third theme route on features between them. The Duisburg: Industrial Culture on the Rhine is made up these three routes.

The presentation of the route combines a caring attitude to the locations with a scientific attitude and an easily accessible manner of presentation.

Some locations are also included in other theme routes of the Industrial Heritage Trail.

An guide to the Duisburg: Town and Harbour Theme Route, Duisburg: Stadt und Hafen (Themenroute 1) by Dagmar Bungardt and Esher Gudrun has been published by the Regionalverband Ruhr, but is only available in German. A more comprehensive Atlas containing all the Theme Routes is however available with text in both German and English.

== Heritage Trail 1: Inner harbour (Hafenpfad Inner) ==
German name	English meaning	Description	Photo
Museum Küppersmühle	Küpper's Mill Museum	Centre for Modern and Contemporary Art	Küppersmühle Museum
Innenhafen Duisburg	Duisburg Inner Harbour	Former central harbour of Duisburg	Duisburg Inner Harbour
Holzgracht	Wood Canal	One of the three canals built in the post-industrial redevelopment of the area	Holzgracht
Werhahnmühle	Werhahn Mill	Redeveloped nineteenth century mill	Werhanmühle at night
Hafenwohnanlagen Duisburg	Harbour Residential Buildings	Residential buildings located near the Duisburg Canals	Residential building alongside Hansageracht
Kindertagesstätte Hansegracht	Hansegracht Child Day Care Centre	Child day care centre located in former tobacco factory	Kindertagesstätte Hansegracht
Hansegracht	Hansa Canal	One of the three canals built in the post-industrial redevelopment of the area	Hansegracht, one of the three Duisburger Innenhafen canals
Faktorei 21	Factor 21	A 1900 storage building reconstructed as offices and a restaurant	Faktorei 21, July 2011
Hafenforum (Duisburg)			Hafenforum, July 2011
Speicher Allgemeine	Allgemeine grainstore	a former granary now used for office space and parking facilities	Speicher Allgemeine July 2011
Portsmouth Damm and Hafennordseite Duisburg			Portsmouth Damm, July 2008
Eurogate Duisburg			
Spar-Zentrale Duisburg			
Duisburger Holzhafen			
Seniorenzentrum			
Garten der Erinnerung	Garden of Remembrance		Garden of Remembrance showing part of the Jewish quarter
Jüdisches Gemeindezentrum			
Fußgängerbrücke und Marina Duisburg			
Stadtmauer			Duisburg town wall remnants
Kultur- und Stadthistorisches Museum			
Stadtarchiv			
Schwanentorbrücke			Schwanentorbrücke
Kontorhaus			
Polizeitechnische Dienste			
Steiger Schwanentor – Hafenrundfahrt Duisburger Häfen			

== Heritage Trail 2: Ruhrort (Hafenpfad Ruhrort) ==
German name	English meaning	Description	Photo
Steiger Schifferbörse			
Gildeplatz-Hafenstraße			
Dammstraße			
Ehemaliges Rathaus			
Neumarkt			
Fabrikstraße			
Bergiusstraße			
Vinckeplatz			
Tausendfensterhaus			
Karlsplatz			
Friedhof – Grabstätte Haniel			
Friedrichsplatz/Bahnhof			
Fürst-Bismarck-Straße			
Friedrich-Ebert-Brücke			Friedrich-Ebert-Brücke tower
Eisenbahnhafen			
Museum der Deutschen Binnenschifffahrt			Binnenschifffahrt smuseum

== Heritage Trail 3: Between Duisburg and Ruhrort (Schauplätze von Hafen und Schifffahrt zwischen Duisburg und Ruhrort) ==
German name	English meaning	Description	Photo
Werfthafen – Bunkerhafen			
Vinckekanal und duisport Duisburger Hafen AG			
Freihafen			
Stahlinsel			
Karl-Lehr-Brücke			
Rheinorange			Rheinorange at the Ruhrmündung
Ölinsel			
Kohleninseln			
Schrottinsel			
Kohlenkipperfundament			
Schiffswerften			
Ruhrschleuse und Ruhrwehr			Ruhrschleuse and Ruhrwehr
Monopol-Schleppdienst			
Schleppamt Duisburg			
Schleuse Meiderich			The lower gates at Schleuse Meiderich
