= Assmann =

Assmann, Aßmann or Assman (pronounced "oss-man") is a German surname.

== History and usage ==
The surname Assman comes from Assmannshausen. Despite its pronunciation of "oss-man", it is still associated with the profanity "ass".

The surname Assman gained notoriety in 1995, when Canadian gas station employee Dick Assman was featured on Late Show with David Letterman.

In 2019, a man named Dave Assman of Melville, Saskatchewan, earned notoriety when he attempted to get a vanity licence plate with his surname on it; when Saskatchewan Government Insurance rejected his request, he had a tailgate-sized replica of an "ASSMAN" licence plate painted on the back of his truck, mimicking an episode of the sitcom Seinfeld. News reports did not indicate if Dick and Dave Assman were related, but did note both pronounced their names the same way and were of German descent.

== Notable people with the surname ==
- Aleida Assmann (born 1947), professor of Egyptology, literary and cultural studies
- Arno Assmann (1908–1979), German actor and film director
- Charles Assmann (born 1972), Canadian football player
- Dick Assman (1934–2016), Canadian petrol station worker
- Elisabeth Aßmann (born 1990), German politician
- Fabián Assmann (born 1986), Argentine football goalkeeper
- Hans Assmann (1923–1998), alleged KGB intelligence officer
- Hans Erasmus Aßmann (1646–1699), German poet, statesman and translator
- Jan Assmann (1938–2024), German Egyptologist
- Katja Aßmann (born 1971), German art historian
- Peter Assmann (born 1963), Austrian writer and visual artist
- Richard Assmann (1845–1918), meteorologist
- Sarah M. Assmann, American biologist
- Susan Assmann, American mathematician and statistician
- William F. Assmann (1862–1920), balloonist
