= Duisburg Canals =

Coordinates: 51°26′23″N 6°45′13″E

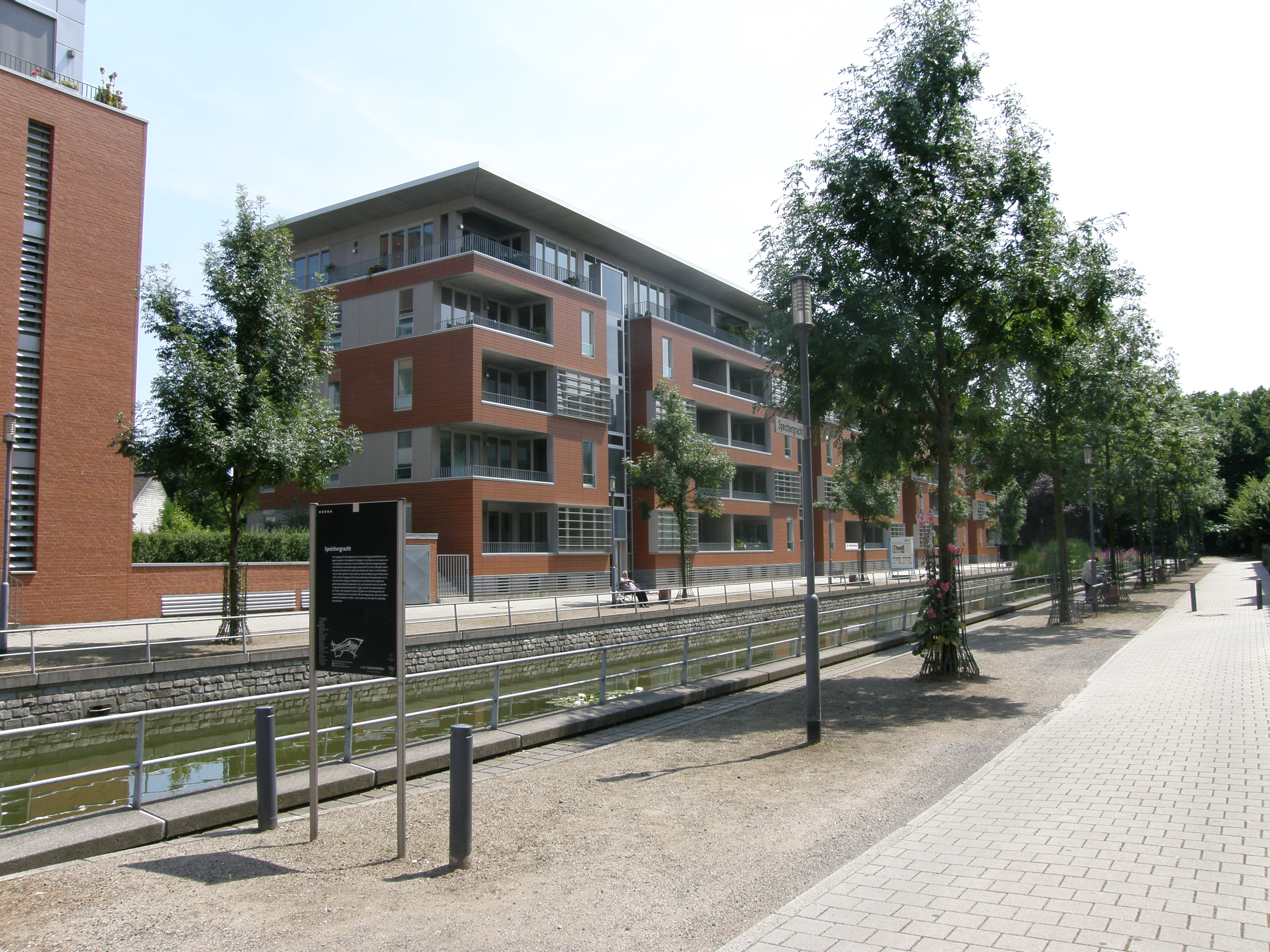
- Speichergracht

Geography
- Connects to: Ruhr Industrial Heritage Trail

The Duisburg Canals are part of the master plan developed by Foster and Partners for the reconstruction of the Duisburg Inner Harbour. They are part of the Duisburg: Town and Harbour section of the Ruhr Industrial Heritage Trail.

An eastern port area was created separated from the rest of the port by the forming an artificial lake 26 m above sea level. The water level is maintained by ensuring that rainwater is channeled into the basin. Excess water is drained to the north side onto a bed of gravel. In case of drought a solar-powered fountain with an annual capacity of 90,000 m³ has been installed by the Hanse canal. Pre-treatment of the water supply is provided by small biotopes at the southern end of the canal.

The area includes housing, some of which is low price.
