= Urbane Künste Ruhr =

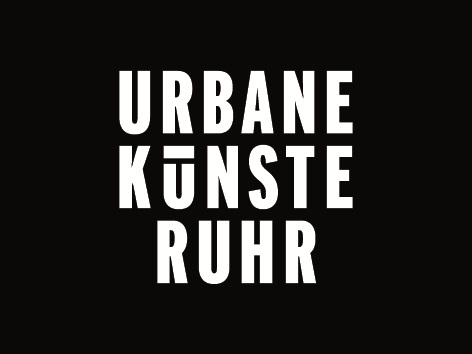
Urban Arts Ruhr logo

Urbane Künste Ruhr (Urban Arts Ruhr) is a German cultural institution founded in 2012, to create art in urban spaces in the city of Ruhr. The institution was established in the aftermath of Ruhr.2010, the European Capital of Culture. It is led by curator Katja Aßmann since its founding.

Urbane Künste Ruhr projects may include temporary architectural structures, urban space problem solving, and projects that include art research. Urbane Künste Ruhr is to develop cooperations with artists and scholars from various disciplines in order to create new cultural, political, and social strategies for metropolitan areas.

== Projects ==
Urbane Künste Ruhr contributes periodically to the international music and arts festival Ruhrtriennale. Alongside these projects, Urbane Künste Ruhr generates programs within the three overall categories "Mobile Laboratories", "Regional Interventions", and "Strategies for the Region". The labs are considered to be a “research department” of the Ruhr metropolitan area. Curated by Urbane Künste Ruhr, the labs research the urban space of the Ruhr with artistic means on an equal footing with scientific means.

Other projects connected with the second and third programmatic field aim at recent infrastructural ventures of the region, such as the renaturation project for the river Emscher and the highway Ruhrschnellweg. The latter was already the scene for artistic productions and interventions during Ruhr.2010.

== Network approach ==
Beyond programmatic and curatorial activities Urbane Künste Ruhr is assigned to administer the existing cultural networks in the metropolitan area. The vast creative potentials of the artists working in the region as well as the multitude of significant modern art museums (e.g. Museum Folkwang, Museum Küppersmühle, Lehmbruck Museum etc.) joined forces in different networks (e.g. RuhrKunstMuseen, KunstVereineRuhr, "Starke Orte"). Urbane Künste Ruhr promotes these agglomerations by supporting them with infrastructure, marketing, and PR. The institution also encourages the development of new affiliations in the cultural sector.

== Partners ==
=== Institutions ===
A lot of the projects of Urbane Künste Ruhr are co-productions with partner institutions, such as Regionalverband Ruhr, Emschergenossenschaft, Schauspielhaus Bochum, ETH Zurich, PACT Zollverein, Dortmund University of Applied Sciences and Arts, Ringlokschuppen Mülheim, and many more.

=== Artists ===
Urbane Künste Ruhr works together with artists like Daniel Buren, Rafael Lozano-Hemmer, rAndom International, Haubitz + Zoche, and many other.
