= Speicher Allgemeine =

Former granary now used for office space and parking facilities

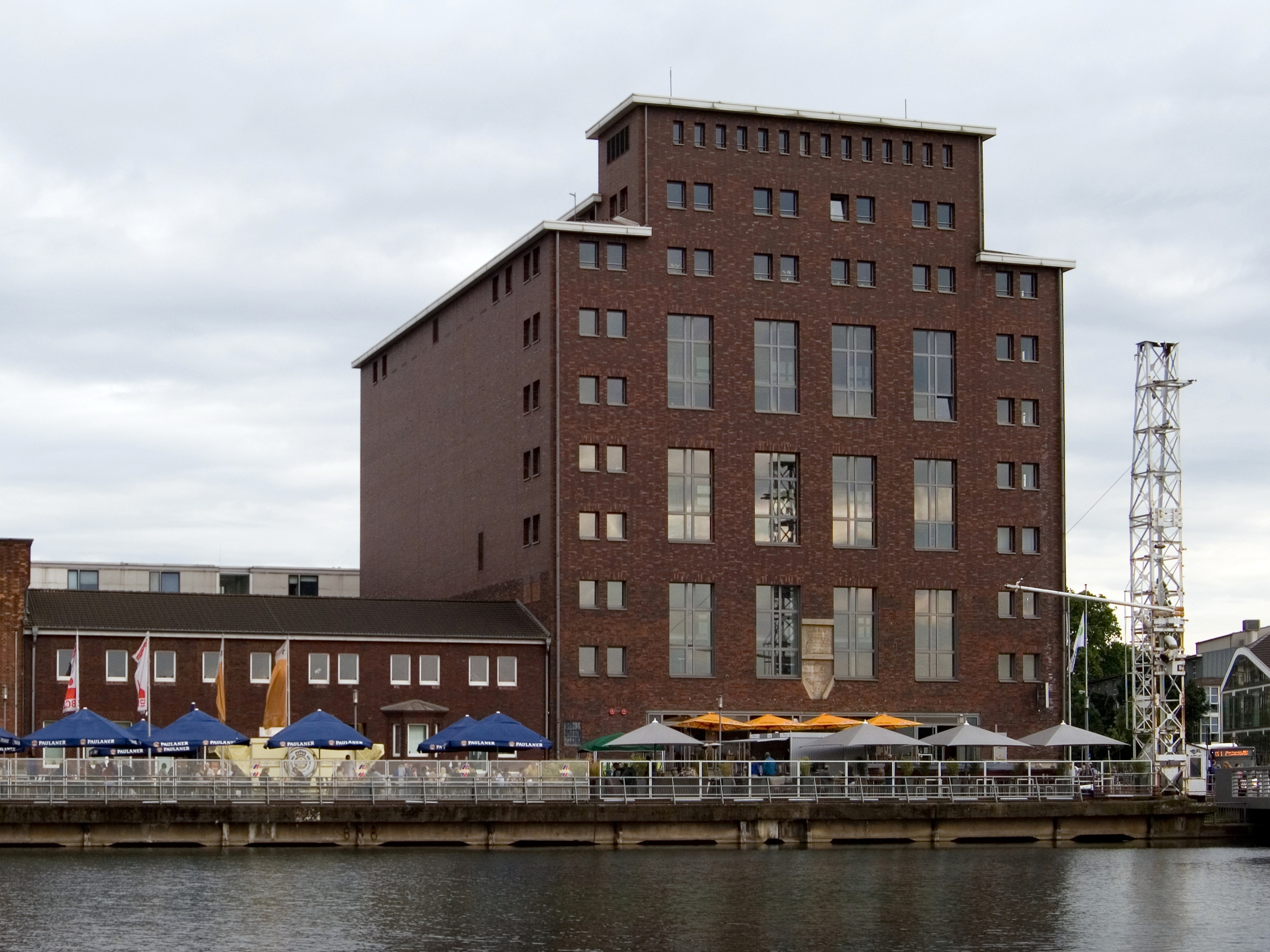
Speicher Allgemeine

The Allgemeine Grainstore is a former granary now used for office space and parking facilities. It is located at 17 Philosophenweg, Duisburg Inner Harbour. The warehouse was built for the "Allgemeine Speditionsgesellschaft" (General Express Company). When it was built in 1936 it transformed the technology of concrete silo construction technology.

It stands prominently on its own near the Holzhafen. The building was rebuilt in 1999 to the designs of the architects Bahl and Partners. The building was dismantled down to its foundations. The façade was reconstructed out of clinker, glass and metal to preserve its historic appearance. Nevertheless it has a highly efficient building shell. It houses office space which can accommodate 200 workers.
