= Assmannshausen =

- Stadtteil of Rüdesheim am Rhein
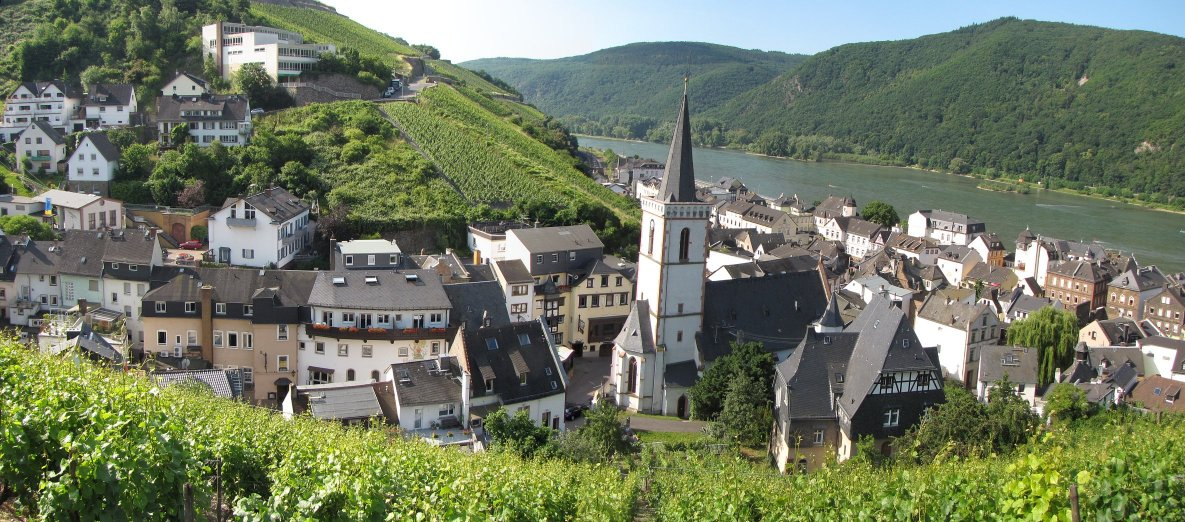

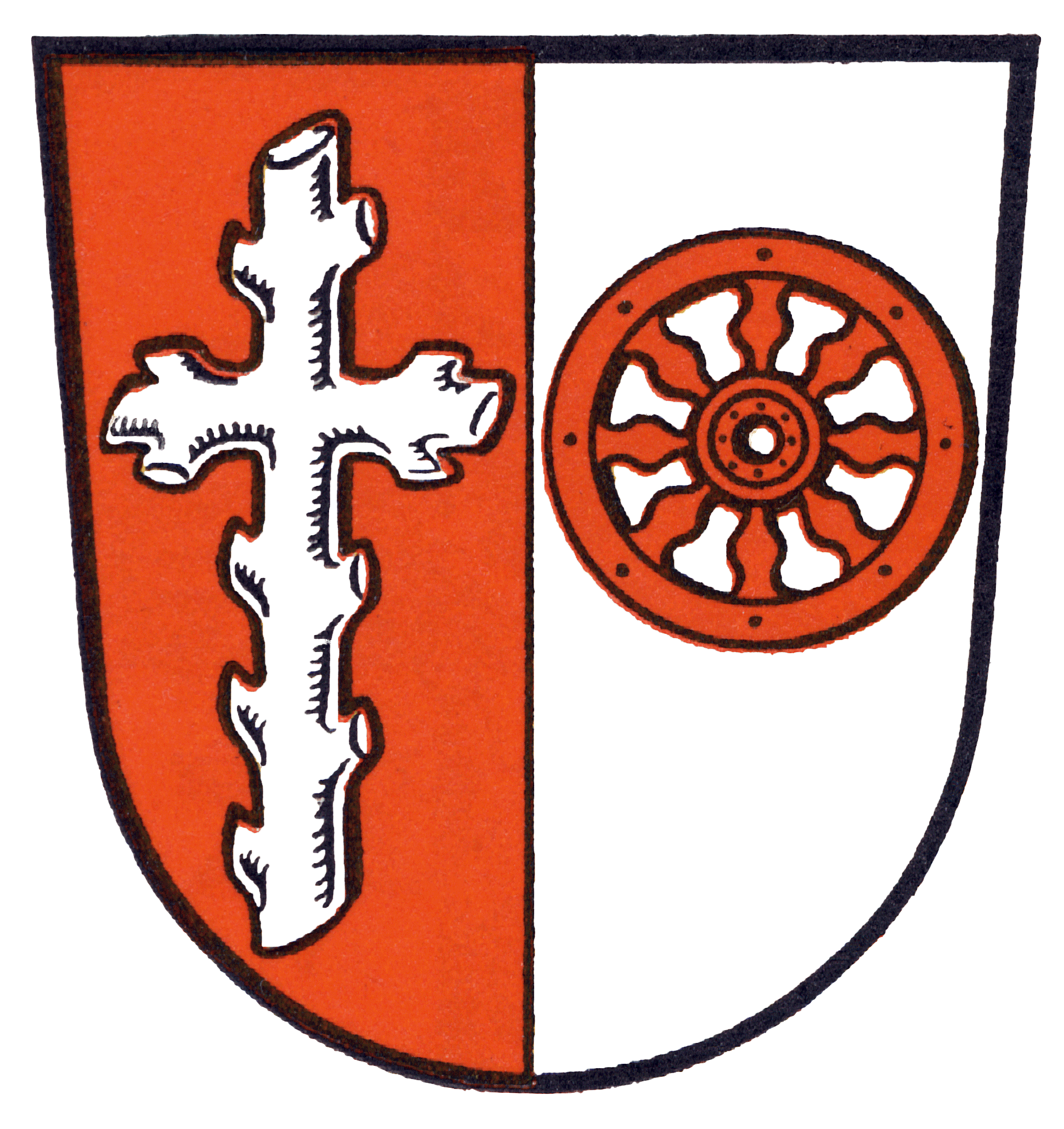
- Coat of arms
- Interactive map of Assmannshausen
- Location within Germany Location within Hesse
- Coordinates: 49°59′17″N 7°52′02″E
- Country: Germany
- State: Hesse
- Admin. region: Darmstadt
- District: Rheingau-Taunus-Kreis
- Town: Rüdesheim am Rhein
- Elevation: 80 m (260 ft)

Population (2018)
  - Total: 995
- Time zone: UTC+01:00 (CET)
  - Summer (DST): UTC+02:00 (CEST)
- Postal codes: 65385
- Dialling codes: 06722
- Vehicle registration: RÜD
- Website: http://www.assmannshausen-am-rhein.de/

Assmannshausen (German pronunciation: [asmansˈhaʊzn̩]) is, since its incorporation in 1977, a quarter of Rüdesheim am Rhein in the Rheingau, located on the Rhine in the state of Hesse, Germany. The village has a lithium spring, spa and a Kurhaus, and is famed for its red wine (Assmannshäuser) made from Pinot noir (German: Spätburgunder), which resembles red Burgundy wine. The Hessische Staatsweingüter Kloster Eberbach are running their VDP red wine estate (Einzellage: Höllenberg, 23.1 ha under vine) in the village.

The heritage-listed former winery Assmanshausen Winery in Queensland, Australia, was named after this region.

Assmannshausen is the origin for the surname Assmann.

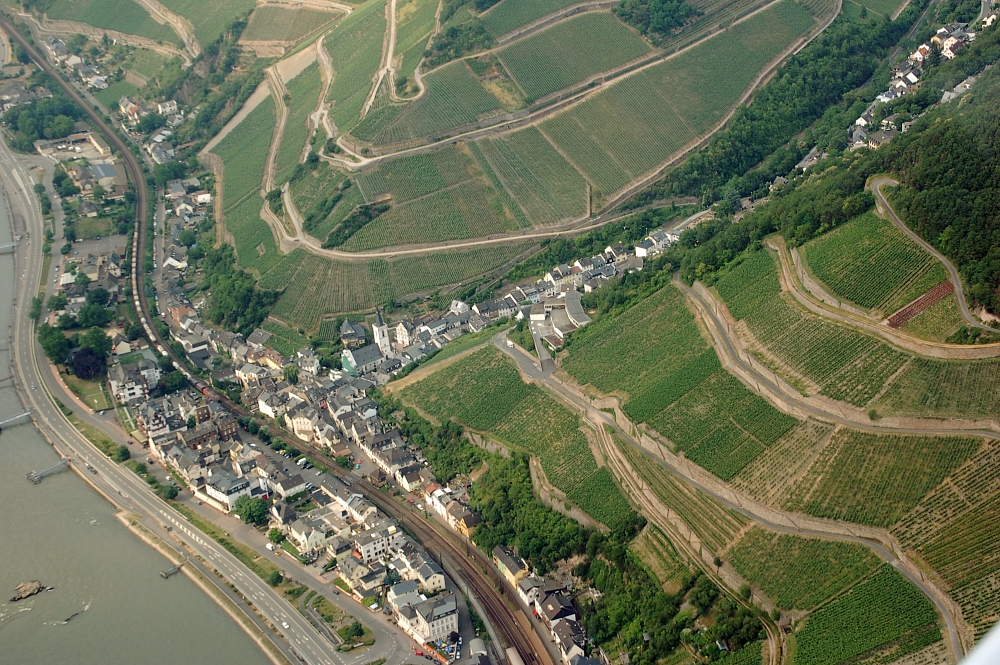
Aerial view of Assmannshausen

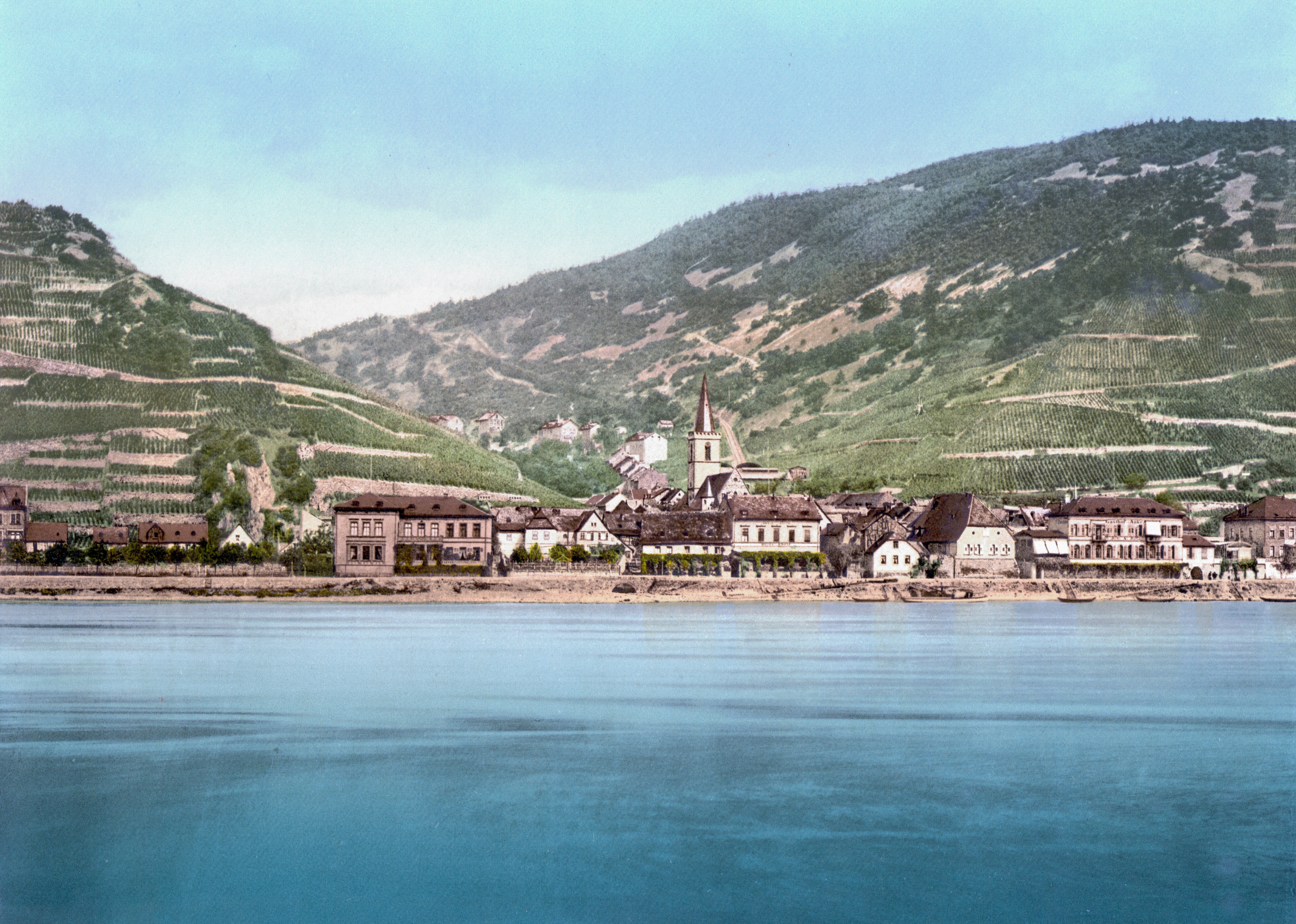
Photochrom print of Assmannshausen in ~1900

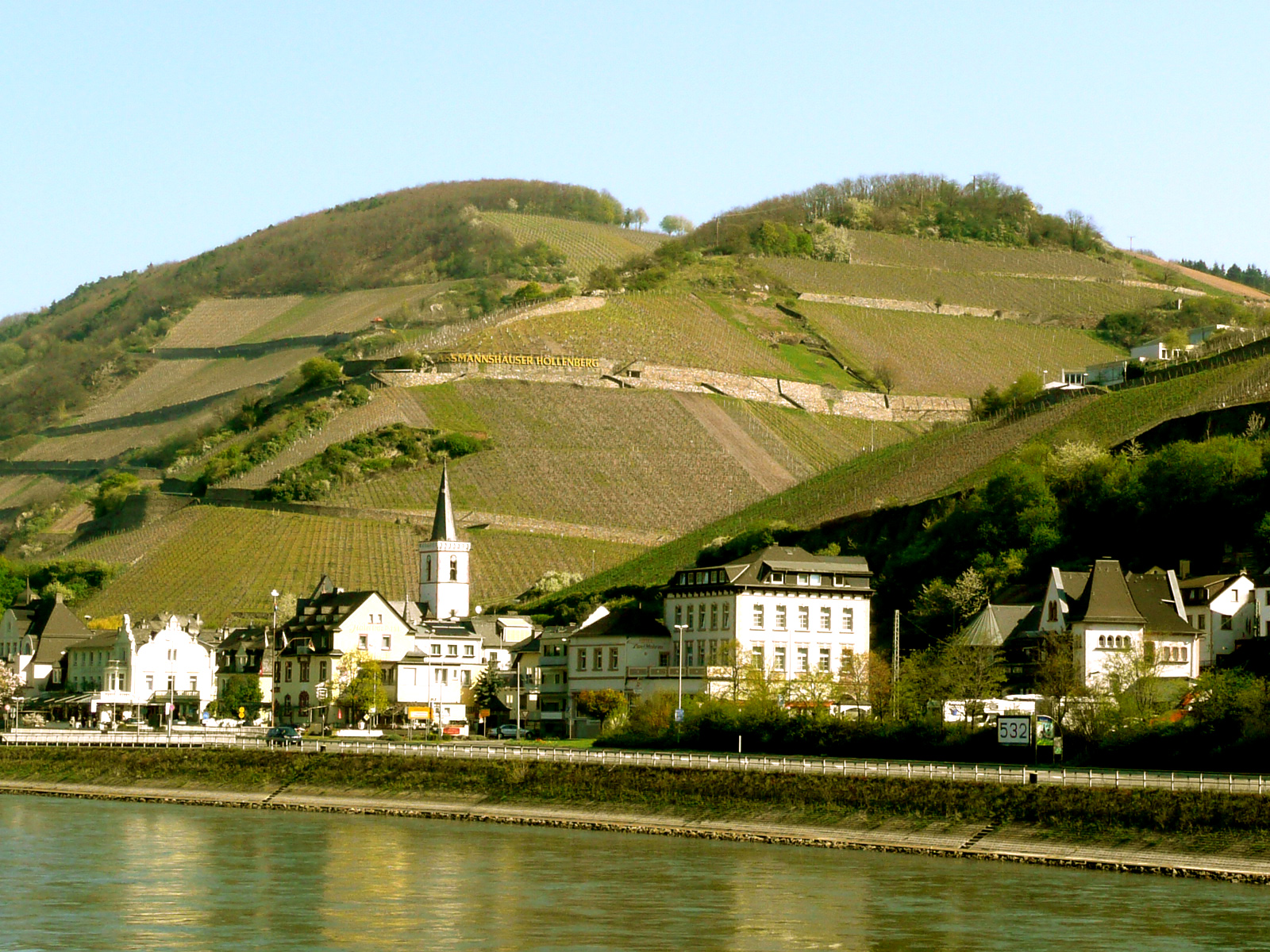
View from Rhine, in April, with the famous Höllenberg Lage

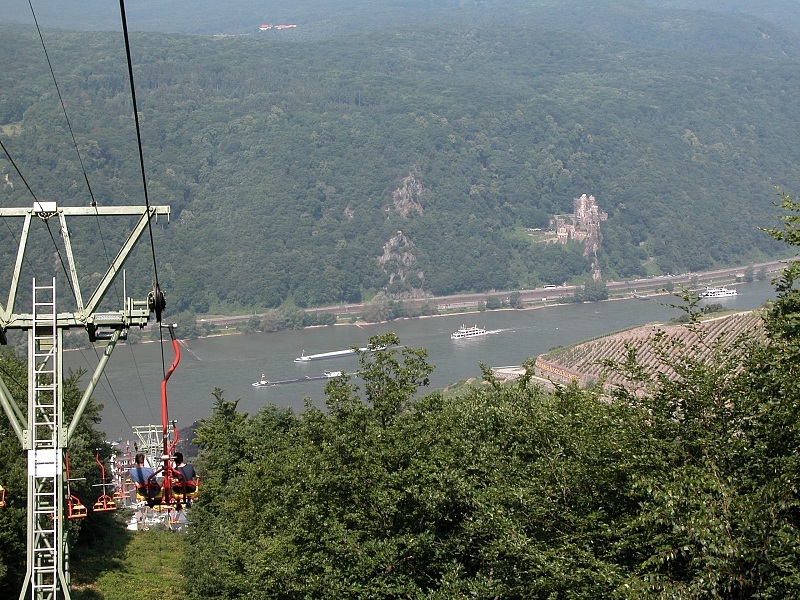
A chairlift in Assmannshausen, view to a Castle Rheinstein on the opposite bank of river Rheine

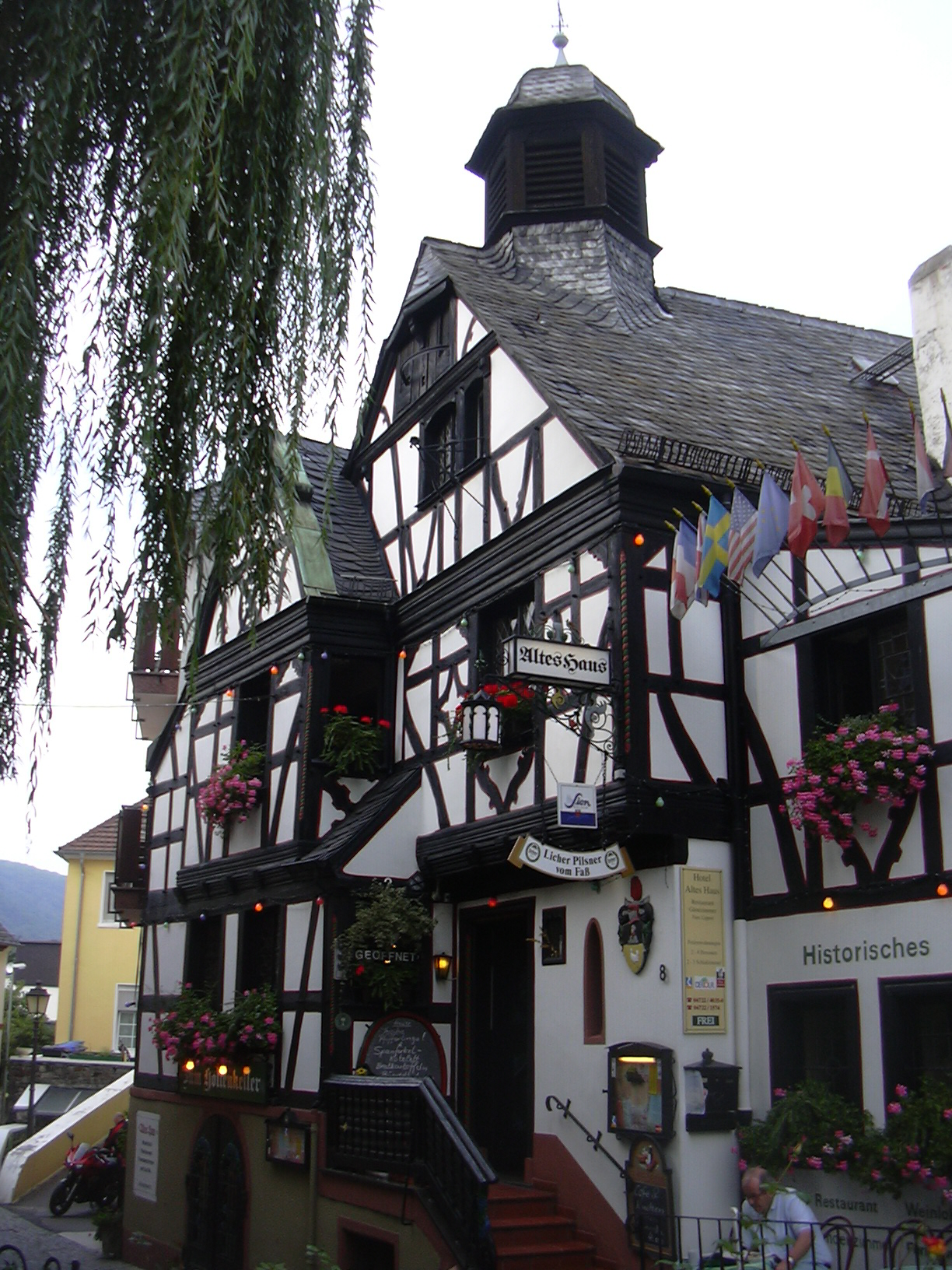
Historic half-timbered house
