= Portsmouth Damm =

Coordinates: 51.4407°N 6.7680°E

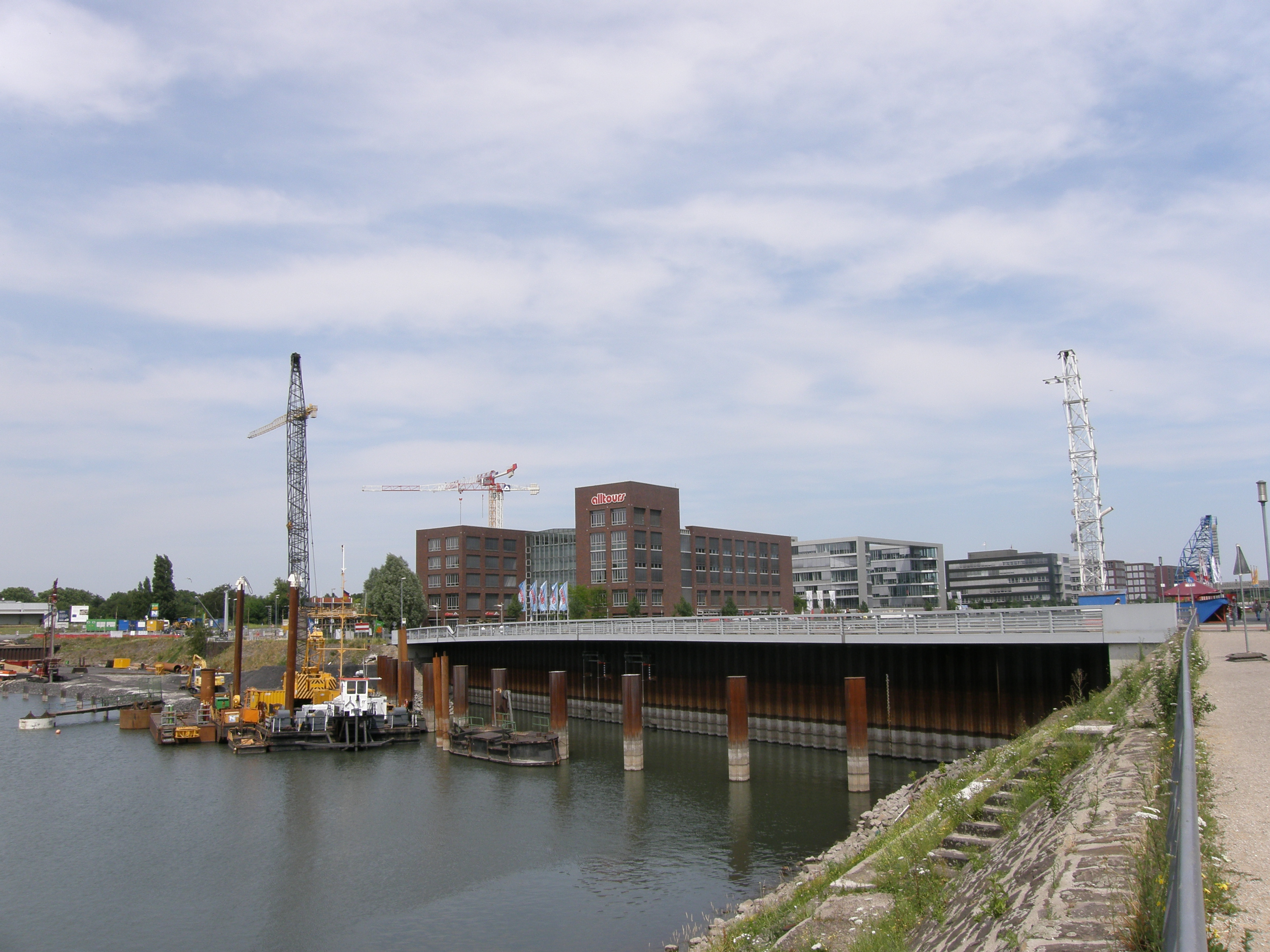
Portsmouth Damm, July 2008

Portsmouth Damm is a 97-metre-long (318 ft) structure located in the Inner Harbour of Duisburg, Germany. It was completed in 1998. It links both sides of the Inner Harbour, whilst also separating the rear harbour which is maintained at a higher level. On 18 August 2000 it was named after the English city of Portsmouth, with which Duisburg had been twinned for fifty years. The architects were Norman Foster and Partners.
