= Werhahnmühle =

Coordinates: 51°26′27″N 6°46′20″E

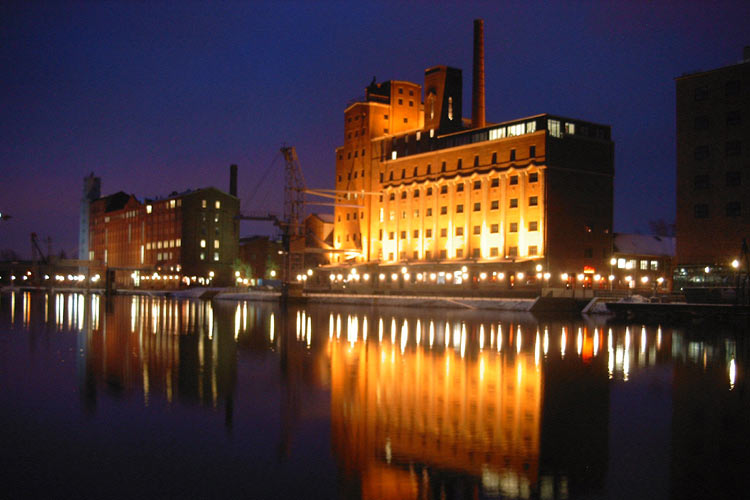
Warehouses of the Küppersmühle and Werhahnmühle

The Werhahnmühle is a complex of offices, restaurants and a museum located in Duisburg's Inner Harbour It occupies the former silo and mill buildings of the Rheinische Mühlenwerke Werhahn. It is part of the Duisburg: Town and Harbour section of the Ruhr Industrial Heritage Trail.

== History ==
The Rheinische mill works were commenced with a building erected by Jacob Cohen in 1896. After his death in 1919 his sons William Cohen (then Chairman of the Industry and Commerce Duisburg-Wesel) and Hugo Cohen (Judge of the District Court Duisburg), inherited the mill. With the rise to power of the Nazis the business was confiscated from the Jewish Cohen family on 3 January 1936, and taken over by the brothers Hermann and Wilhelm Werhahn Neuss. The company changed its name to Rheinische Mühlenwerke Werhahn. The Cohen family managed to emigrate to South America and survive the holocaust.

In 1969, the mill itself was closed down but the storage space was used for state grain reserves until 1994. The demolition was prevented by a public pressure. The master plan by Foster and Partners for the inner harbour included the preservation of the old industrial, storage and office buildings. Between 2001 and 2002, the entire complex of buildings (about 27,000 cubic meters of enclosed space) was converted on behalf of Franz Brüggemann GEPAG into exhibition space, offices, dining rooms and doctors' surgeries. This cost for €3.3 million The listed buildings were gutted, leaving only the outer walls and interior load-bearing structures. Some buildings were combined to form an ensemble (Western memory, Flour, Sakhr funnels). On the western facade of the silo, the exterior has been significantly altered with the insertion of large windows.
