= Sarah M. Assmann =

American biologist

Sarah Mary Assmann
- Education: Stanford University
- Scientific career
- Workplaces: Pennsylvania State University
- Thesis: Stomatol responses to light and carbon dioxide (1986)

Sarah M. Assmann is an American biologist known for her research on plants and signal transduction. She is an elected fellow of the American Association for the Advancement of Science.

== Education and career ==
Assmann undergraduate degree in biology is from Williams College (1980). She earned her Ph.D. in biology from Stanford University in 1986. Following her Ph.D., she was a postdoc at the University of California, Riverside until she joined the faculty at Harvard University in 1987. In 1993 she moved to Pennsylvania State and was promoted to professor in 1997. In 2002, Assmann was named the Waller Professor of Biology at Pennsylvania State University. She was elected a fellow of American Association for the Advancement of Science in 2009, and from 2009 to 2010 served as president of the American Society of Plant Biologists.

== Selected publications ==
- Wang, X.-Q. (2001-06-15). "G Protein Regulation of Ion Channels and Abscisic Acid Signaling in Arabidopsis Guard Cells". Science. 292 (5524): 2070–2072. doi:10.1126/science.1059046. PMID 11408655. S2CID 1453453.
- Ding, Yiliang; Tang, Yin; Kwok, Chun Kit; Zhang, Yu; Bevilacqua, Philip C.; Assmann, Sarah M. (2014-01-30). "In vivo genome-wide profiling of RNA secondary structure reveals novel regulatory features". Nature. 505 (7485): 696–700. doi:10.1038/nature12756. ISSN 0028-0836. PMID 24270811. S2CID 205236375.
- Shimazaki, Ken-ichiro; Doi, Michio; Assmann, Sarah M.; Kinoshita, Toshinori (2007). "Light Regulation of Stomatal Movement". Annual Review of Plant Biology. 58 (1): 219–247. Bibcode:2007AnRPB..58..219S. doi:10.1146/annurev.arplant.57.032905.105434. ISSN 1543-5008. PMID 17209798.
