= Transformation design =

Design process

In broad terms, transformation design is a human-centered, interdisciplinary process that seeks to create desirable and sustainable changes in behavior and form – of individuals, systems and organizations. It is a multi-stage, iterative process of applying design principles to large and complex systems.

Its practitioners examine problems holistically rather than reductively to understand relationships as well as components to better frame the challenge. They then prototype small-scale systems – composed of objects, services, interactions and experiences – that support people and organizations in achievement of a desired change. Successful prototypes are then scaled.

Because transformation design is about applying design skills in non-traditional territories, it often results in non-traditional design outputs.^{3} Projects have resulted in the creation of new roles, new organizations, new systems and new policies. These designers are just as likely to shape a job description, as they are a new product.^{3}

This emerging field draws from a variety of design disciplines - service design, user-centered design, participatory design, concept design, information design, industrial design, graphic design, systems design, interactive design, experience design - as well as non-design disciplines including cognitive psychology and perceptual psychology, linguistics, cognitive science, architecture, haptics, information architecture, ethnography, storytelling and heuristics.

== History ==
Though academics have written about the economic value of and need for transformations over the years^{7,8}, its practice first emerged in 2004 when The Design Council, the UK's national strategic body for design, formed RED: a self-proclaimed "do-tank" challenged to bring design thinking to the transformation of public services.^{1}

This move was in response to Prime Minister Tony Blair's desire to have public services "redesigned around the needs of the user, the patients, the passenger, the victim of crime".^{3}

The RED team, led by Hilary Cottam, studied these big, complex problems to determine how design thinking and design techniques could help government rethink the systems and structures within public services and possibly redesign them from beginning to end.^{3}

Between 2004 and 2006, the RED team, in collaboration with many other people and groups, developed techniques, processes and outputs that were able to "transform" social issues such as preventing illness, managing chronic illnesses, senior citizen care, rural transportation, energy conservation, re-offending prisoners and public education.

In 2015 Braunschweig University of Art / Germany has launched a new MA in Transformation Design. In 2016 The Glasgow School of Art launched another masters program "M.Des in Design Innovation and Transformation Design". In 2019 the University of Applied Sciences Augsburg / Germany launched a masters program in Transformation Design.

== Process ==
Transformation design, like user-centered design, starts from the perspective of the end user. Designers spend a great deal of time not only learning how users currently experience the system and how they want to experience the system, but also co-creating with them the designed solutions.

Because transformation design tackles complex issues involving many stakeholders and components, more expertise beyond the user and the designer is always required. People such as, but not limited to, policy makers, sector analysts, psychologists, economists, private businesses, government departments and agencies, front-line workers and academics are invited to participate in the entire design process - from problem definition to solution development.^{6}

With so many points-of-view brought into the process, transformation designers are not always 'designers.' Instead, they often play the role of moderator. Through varying methods of participation and co-creation, these moderating designers create hands-on, collaborative workshops (a.k.a. charrette) that make the design process accessible to the non-designers.

Ideas from workshops are rapidly prototyped and beta-tested in the real world with a group of real end users. Their experience with and opinions of the prototypes are recorded and fed back into the workshops and development of the next prototype.

== See also ==
- Human-centered design

== Sources ==
1. RED's homepage
2. https://www.designcouncil.org.uk/ Design Council's homepage
3. White Paper published by RED which discusses transformation design
4. RED's website page which talks about transformation design
5. http://www.torinoworlddesigncapital.it/portale/en/content.php?sezioneID=10 Interview with Hilary Cottam at World Design Capital
6. https://web.archive.org/web/20070818190054/http://www.hilarycottam.com/html/RED_Paper%2001%20Health_Co-creating_services.pdf Whitepaper on co-creation
7. The Experience Economy, B.J. Pine and J. Gilmore, Harvard Business School Press 1999. Book discussing the economic value and importance of companies offering transformations
8. The Support Economy, S. Zuboff and J. Maxmin, Viking Press 2002. Book discussing the need for companies and governments to realign themselves with how people live
9. Transformationsdesign - Wege in eine zukunftsfähige Moderne, H. Welzer and B. Sommer, oekom 2014
10. Transformation Design - Perspectives on a new Design Attitude, W. Jonas, S. Zerwas and K. von Anshelm, Birkhäuser 2015
