= William F. Assmann =

American balloonist (1862–1920)

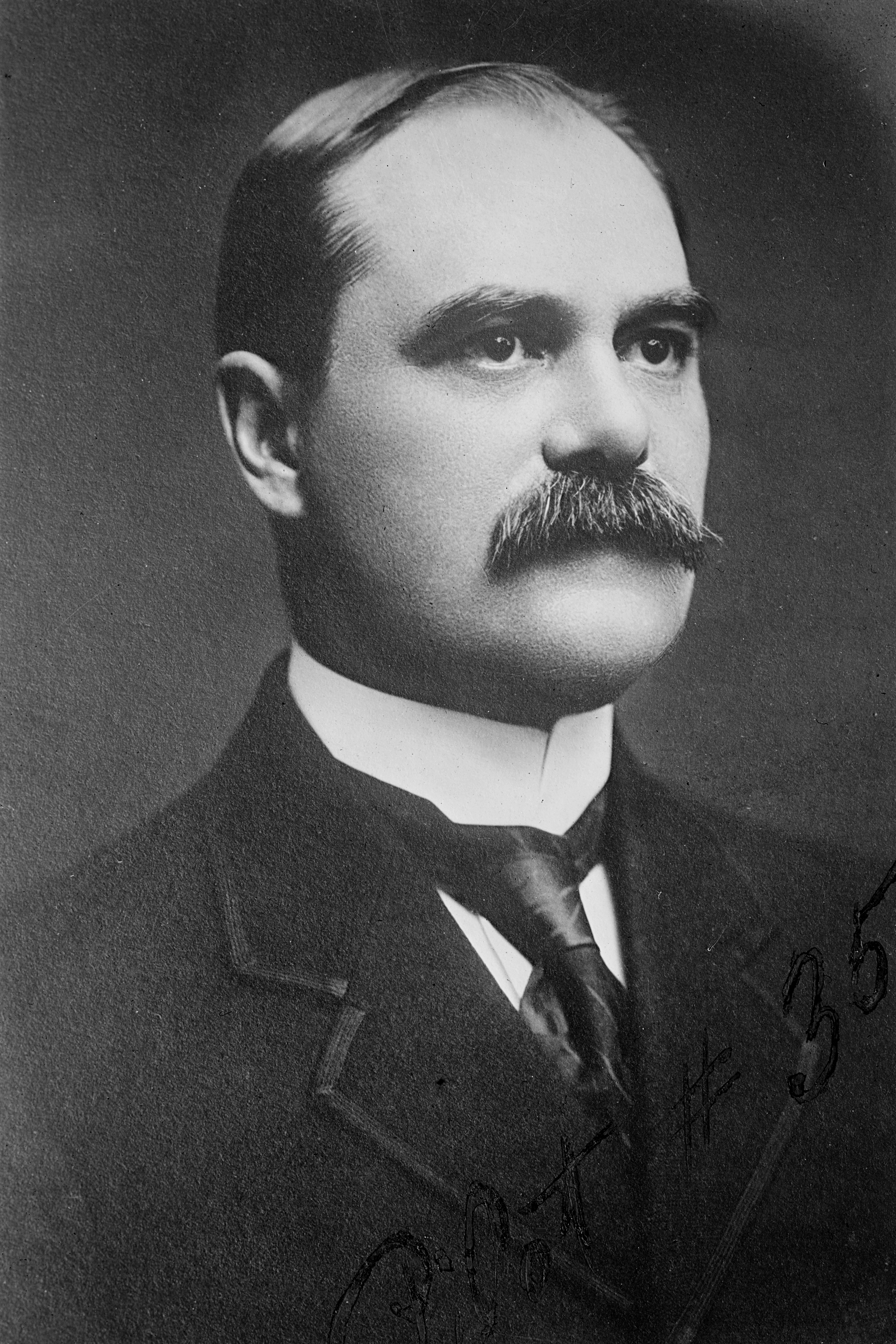
- Assmann circa 1910–1915
- Born: July 1862; St. Louis, Missouri, U.S.
- Died: October 19, 1920 (aged 58)
- Occupation: Balloonist
- Known for: Record-setting balloon flights; participant in the James Gordon Bennett International Balloon Race

William F. Assmann (July 1862 – 19 October 1920) was a record setting balloonist.

== Biography ==
He was born in 1862 in St. Louis, Missouri.

In 1910 he ascended to 4,000 feet and traveled 206 miles.

On 17 October 1910, William Assman and Lieutenant Leopold Vogt, of the German Army, took off in the hydrogen-filled "Harburg III", from St. Louis, Missouri, one of ten balloons in the James Gordon Bennett International Balloon Race. At 6:10 pm, 18 October, they crossed into Canada; by 9:00 pm they opted to land as their ballast was getting low, but were over the waters of Georgian Bay, and thus continued onward. Two hours later, in the pitch black of night — having traveled 850 miles from St. Louis, at speeds upwards of 60 miles per hour—Assman and Vogt, having used up all but 2 ½ sacks of ballast, decided they had no alternative but to put down. They were over Lake Nipissing, Ontario, at 18,000 feet. Lt. Vogt later described to newspaper reporters pulling a valve, and the "Harburg III" plummeting in a “terminal velocity descent”. As the aeronauts were about to be smashed to death on Gull Island, the wind cast their balloon into the lake. Both men were momentarily knocked unconscious by the impact. William Assman’s left arm was broken, and his right hand badly sprained, an artery in the wrist cut. Despite his injuries the men were forced to swim to nearby Gull Island, where they tied the balloon to a tree. For two hours they shouted for assistance, but were far enough out in the lake (which is deep in the Canadian wilderness) that they got no response.

After an all-night stay on the island, soaked and cold from their episode in the lake, Assman bleeding profusely from his cut, the aeronauts were rescued around 6:00 am by two local Native Indians passing by in a canoe. The men were paddled 10 miles to the tiny hamlet of Nipissing Village, south of the railway town of North Bay, Ontario. Assman's injuries were attended to by a local doctor. The "Harburg III" was towed to shore, and transported with its crew to New York by train. A number of the balloon’s instruments were lost, though it’s unknown if they fell in the lake or were pilfered as souvenirs.

The flight of William Assman and Lt. Vogt and their subsequent crash made headlines around the world. They placed fifth in the race.

In 1911 he took part in the Kansas City national balloon race in an elimination competition.

He died on 19 October 1920.
