= Katja Aßmann =

German curator and arts administrator

Katja Aßmann (born 28 May 1971) is a German curator and arts administrator. She is currently the artistic director of Urbane Künste Ruhr (Urban Arts Ruhr).

== About ==
Aßmann, who studied architecture and art history in Bochum. In 1999, Aßmann directed the art and culture department of the International Architecture Exhibition Emscher Park. From 2002 to 2007 she worked as freelance curator for several exhibition projects (e.g. “The Wall” from Christo and Jeanne-Claude, “ENTRY2006” in cooperation with MoMA, Cooper-Hewitt Museum et al.). In 2007, Aßmann was assigned to manage the divisions Architecture, Urban Planning, and Visual Arts of the European Capital of Culture Ruhr.2010.

Since 2012, Katja Aßmann is artistic director of Urbane Künste Ruhr (Urban Arts Ruhr), a cultural institution that focuses on art in urban spaces. Aßmann developed the artistic conception for Urbane Künste Ruhr and curates own productions with various national and international artists and co-productions with artistic and scientific partner institutions from the Ruhr and abroad.

== Projects ==
Katja Aßmann curated an array of projects for IBA Emscher Park, for the European Capital of Culture Ruhr.2010, and as freelance curator.

Some of these projects are:

- The Wall (exhibition project) by Christo and Jeanne-Claude, Gasometer Oberhausen
- Charles and Ray Eames exhibition, Vitra Design Museum
- Several exhibitions at Lehmbruck-Museum Duisburg
- Establishment of the Centre for International Light Art Unna
- ENTRY2006 (exhibition project) in cooperation with MoMA, Cooper-Hewitt Museum, Vitra Design Museum, at Zeche Zollverein Essen

== Publications ==
- An Experiment with a Bright Future: Ruhr.2010 – European Capital of Culture. In Söke Dinkla/Peter Greulich/Karl Janssen (ed.): Tiger & Turtle - Magic Mountain. A Landmark in Duisburg by Heike Mutter und Ulrich Genth. Ostfildern 2012, p. 23–28, ISBN 978-3-7757-2822-5.
- European Capital of Culture Ruhr.2010 – Between Art and Urbanity (together with Karl-Heinz Petzinka). In MAP Markus Ambach Projekte/StadtBauKultur NRW (ed.): B1|A40. The Beauty of the Grand Road. Berlin 2010, pp. 152–157, ISBN 978-3-86859-077-7.
- European Culture Capital Ruhr.2010. A Metropolis Reinvents Itself (together with Karl-Heinz Petzinka). In Florian Matzner/Karl-Heinz Petzinka/Jochen Stemplewski (ed.): Emscherkunst.2010. An Island for the Arts. Ostfildern 2010, pp. 23–36, ISBN 978-3-7757-2663-4.
- Dem Wandel ein Gesicht verleihen. Stadt der Möglichkeiten (together with Karl-Heinz Petzinka). In RUHR.2010 GmbH (ed.): RUHR.2010. Die unmögliche Kulturhauptstadt. Chronik einer Metropole im Werden. Essen 2011, pp. 28–39, ISBN 978-3-8375-0363-0.
- Parkautobahn A42. Erlebnisstraße im Emscher Landschaftspark (ed. together with Jörg Dettmar). 2011.
- Über Wasser Gehen. Kunst an der Seseke und ihren Zuflüssen (ed. together with Billie Erlenkamp und Oliver Scheytt). 2010, ISBN 978-3-9814036-2-6.
- The City of Possibilities: Temporary Interventions as a Guide for a New-Style Metropolis (together with Karl-Heinz Petzinka). In TU Dortmund/Landesinitiative StadtBauKultur NRW/RUHR.2010 GmbH (ed.): Temporary City at Particular Locations 2008-2010. 2011, pp. 14–21, ISBN 978-3939-745068.
- Temporary City at Particular Locations 2008-2010: Three Capitals of Culture and Six Universities - a European Dialogue. In: TU Dortmund/Landesinitiative StadtBauKultur NRW/RUHR.2010 GmbH (ed.): Temporary City at Particular Locations 2008-2010. 2011, pp. 6–9, ISBN 978-3939-745068.
