= Rhine Orange =

- Rheinorange (German)
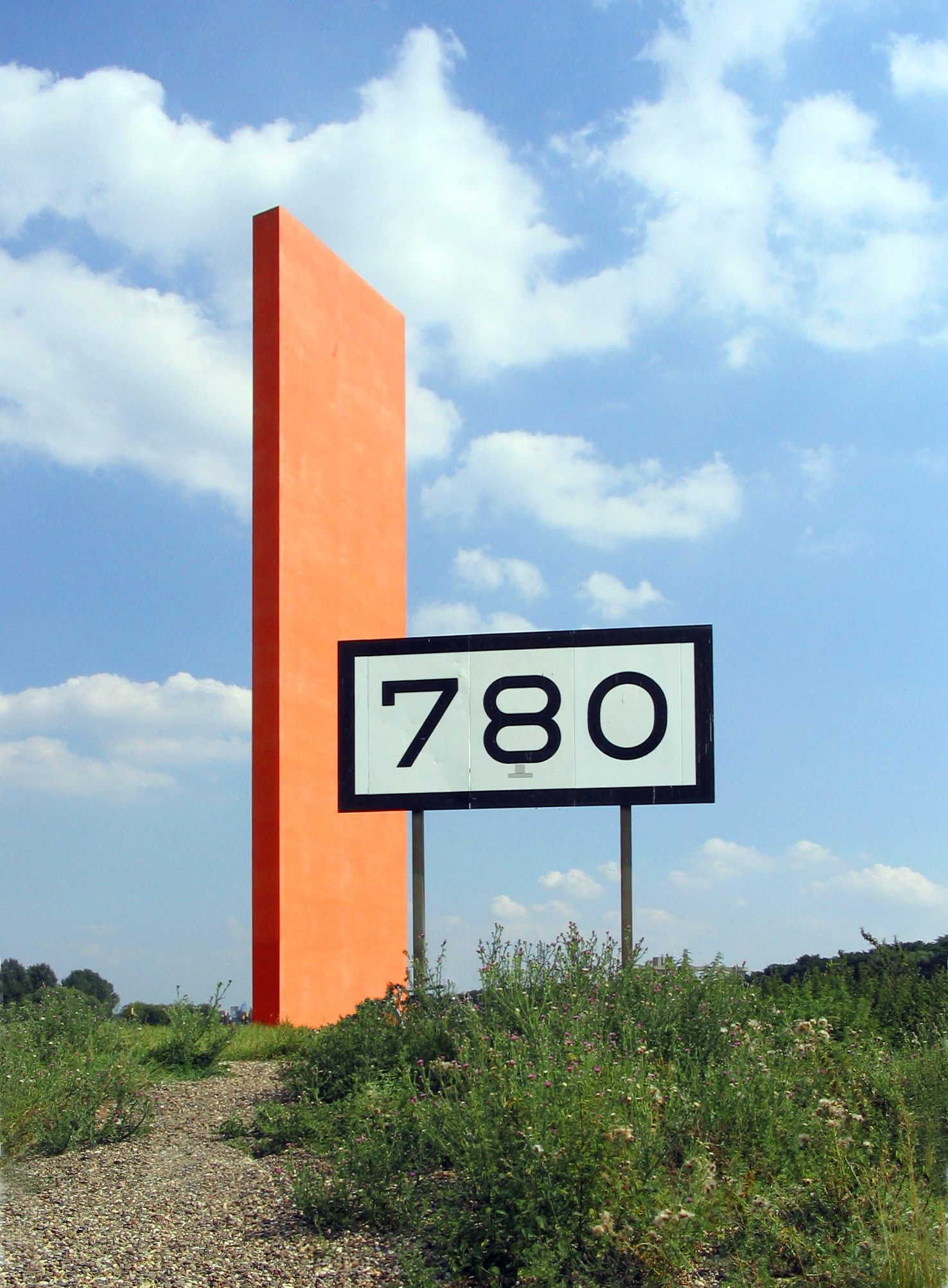
- Larger image

- Location within Germany
- Year: 1992
- Dimensions: 25 m × 7 m × 1 m (82 ft × 23 ft × 3.3 ft)
- Weight: 83 tonnes
- Location: Duisburg-Neuenkamp; 51°26′58.33″N 6°43′21.11″E

Rheinorange (Rhine Orange) is a sculpture erected in 1992 in Duisburg-Neuenkamp, Germany. It is located at the point where the Ruhr flows into the Rhine at 'Rheinkilometer 780', i.e. 780 km from the source of the Rhine. It was constructed from steel by the sculptor Lutz Fritsch from Köln.

It is 25 m tall, 7 m wide and 1 m thick, and weighs 83 tonnes. The cost was over 400.000 DM, which was donated by the Niederrhein IHK (chamber of commerce) after a fund-raising initiative by the young entrepreneur members. The name Rheinorange is actually a play on words. It sounds like Reinorange (pure orange) which is RAL 2004 in the RAL color standard.

The sculpture is intended to form a landmark. The mouth of the river, the largest inland harbour in Europe, the most important steel district in Europe, a base for technology with a future, the Lehmbruck-Museum as an important gallery for modern sculpture in Europe, are all intended to be connected with each other in representing aspects of the economic and cultural life of Duisburg.

The Rhine Orange is a feature on the Ruhr Industrial Heritage Trail.

== Gallery ==
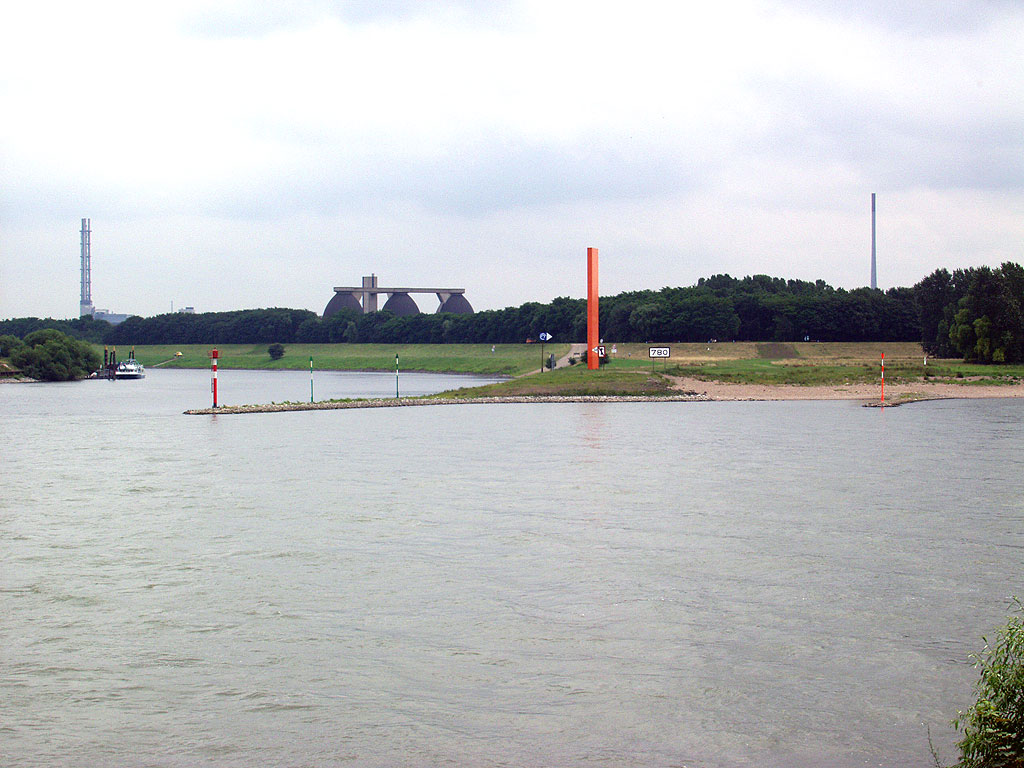
The Ruhr flows into the Rhine

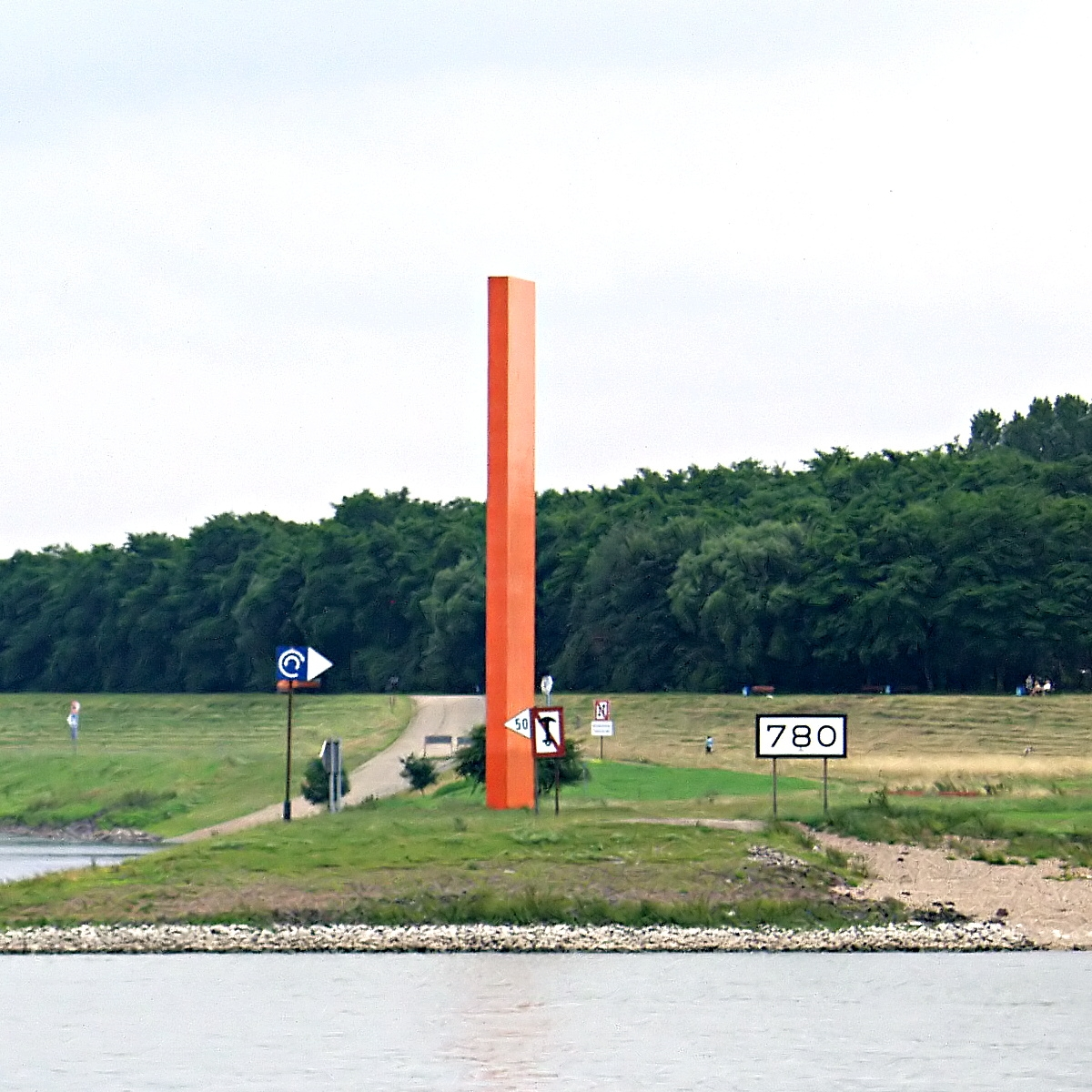
The Rheinorange sculpture
