= Elisabeth Aßmann =

German politician (born 1990)

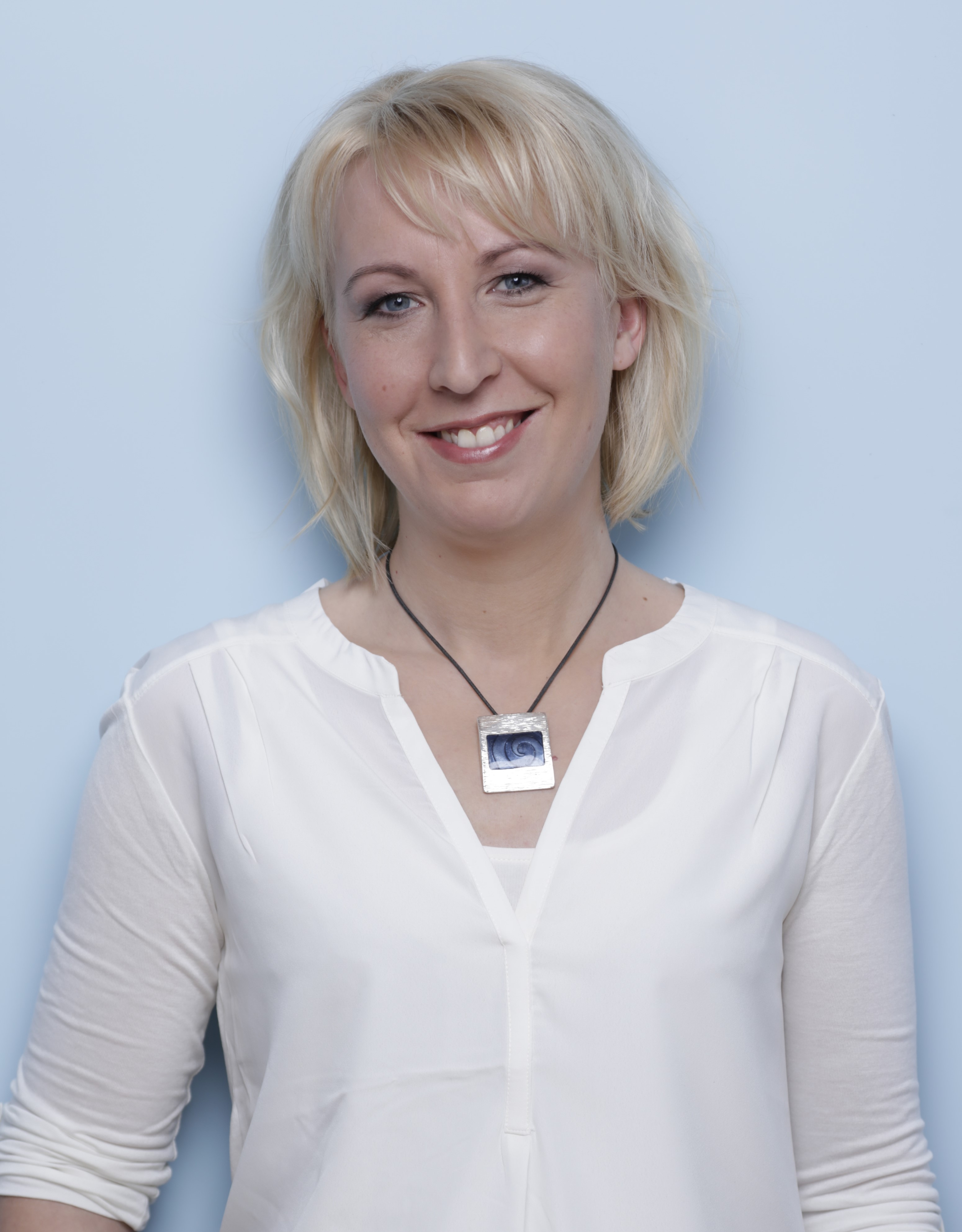
- Aßmann in 2018

State Secretary of Climate Protection, Agriculture, Rural Areas and Environment of Mecklenburg-Vorpommern
- In office 1 May 2022 – 31 July 2025
- Minister-President: Manuela Schwesig
- Preceded by: Jürgen Buchwald

Personal details
- Born: 2 January 1990 (age 36) Greifswald
- Party: Social Democratic Party (since 2009)

Elisabeth Aßmann (born 2 January 1990 in Greifswald) is a German politician. From 2016 to 2022, she served as a member of the Landtag of Mecklenburg-Vorpommern. In 2022, she became state secretary of climate protection, agriculture, rural areas and environment of Mecklenburg-Vorpommern, an office she held until 2025.
