= Museum Küppersmühle =

Museum in Germany

Coordinates: 51°26′28″N 6°46′30″E

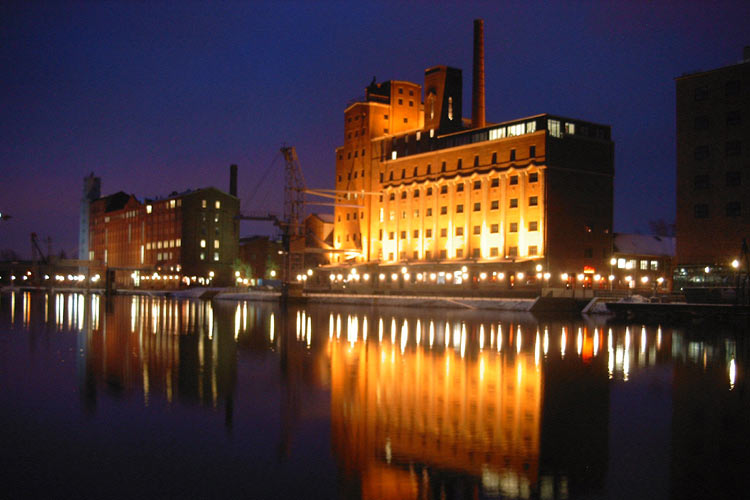
Warehouses of the Küppersmühle and Werhahnmühle

Museum Küppersmühle, Duisburg, North Rhine-Westphalia

Museum Küppersmühle (MKM) is a Centre for Modern and Contemporary Art based in Duisburg's Inner Harbour. It houses the Ströher Collection. It is part of the Duisburg: Town and Harbour section of the Ruhr Industrial Heritage Trail.

== History ==
Built in 1860 by leading local industrialist Wilhelm Vedder, the original building was erected in 1860 with extensive redevelopment between 1908 and 1916. Steel silos were added in the 1930s. In 1969 the merger of Werner & Nicola Germania Mühlenwerke with the Küppers Mühlenwerken in Homberg gave rise to the name "Küppersmühle". The facility closed down in 1972.

In 1999, a grant of DM35 million ($19 million) from the local authority in Duisburg was used to establish the Grothe Museum to display some of real estate developer Hans Grothe's art collection. The museum officially opened in April 1999.

== Architecture ==
From 1999, the original building was redesigned by the Swiss architects Herzog & de Meuron, using a masterplan devised by Norman Foster. After gutting the original industrial building an exhibition space of 3,600 m^{2} (39,000 sq ft) was created across three storeys. With 6-meter high ceilings, grey Turkish basalt natural daylight is provided by the ceiling-high window slits. The building is served by an external staircase attached to the original building.

From 2013 to 2021, Herzog & de Meuron planned and executed an 2,500 m^{2} (27,000 sq ft) extension. Divided into three parts, the new addition contains exhibition halls, as well as utilities and art-handling facilities across five floors.

== Collection ==
Artist James Turrell created two permanent site-specific installations for the building, planned to be revealed in 2022.
