= Schwanentorbrücke =

Bridge in Germany

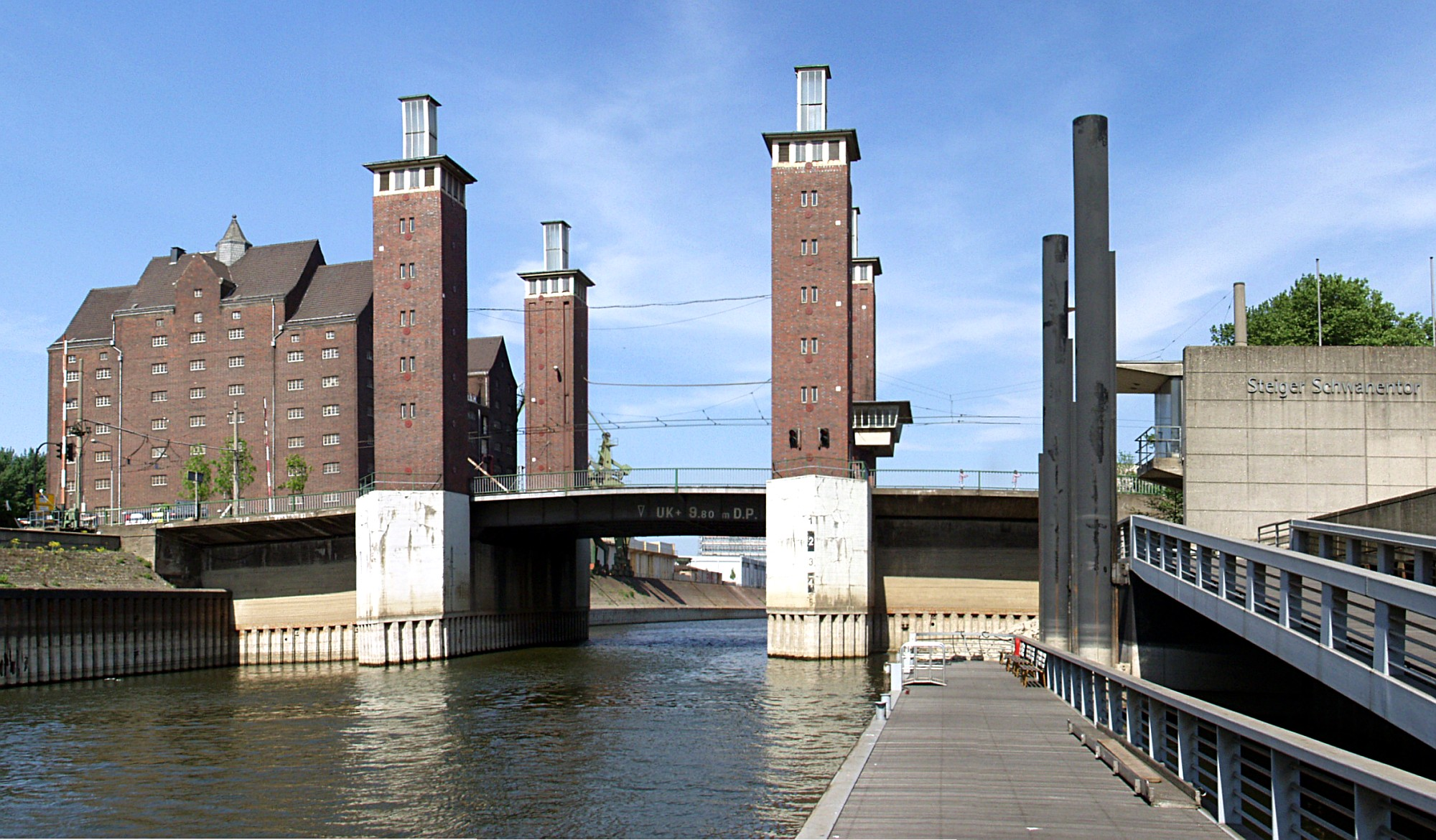
- Schwanentorbrücke
- Coordinates: 51°26′10.43″N 6°45′28.17″E
- Locale: Duisburg

Characteristics
- Design: Vertical-lift bridge
- Material: Steel
- Width: 22 m (72 ft)
- Height: 20 m (65 ft)
- Longest span: 18 m (59 ft)

History
- Designer: Hans-Siegfried Persch
- Construction end: 1950

Location
- Interactive map of Schwanentorbrücke

The Schwanentorbrücke is a vertical-lift bridge in Duisburg, North Rhine-Westphalia, Germany, that crosses the Duisburg Inner Harbour. The bridge can be vertically raised to allow cargo ships to access the inner city, and lowered to allow cars, trains and pedestrians to cross. The bridge is named after the Schwanenturm (meaning 'watch tower) that protected the city walls in the 13th and 14th centuries.

== History ==
Before the Schwanentorbrücke was constructed, a smaller bridge served pedestrians and traders. In 1844, a bridge with train tracks was built, and from 1926 to 1929, it was continuously widened and improved. The Schwanentorbrücke was designed by Hans-Siegfried Persch and completed in 1950. When the city updated the trains in Duisburg they also updated and improved the bridge. These improvements were carried out using plans by Foster & Partner. The transportation industry moved out of the city, meaning the bridge no longer needs to be raised. Workers began a two-stage reconstruction project for the bridge on April 9, 2018. It was expected to last 18 months and cost €4.5 million.

== Structure ==
The bridge has four supporting towers. Inside each tower is a pulley system that lifts the bridge. Electric motors run the bridge, but each tower also contains counter weights weighing several tons which help to lift the bridge. On top of each tower sit large glass lanterns. These lanterns shine green to signal ships that they may pass underneath the bridge. One of the four towers has a control room.
