= Duisburg Inner Harbour =

Former central harbour of Duisburg

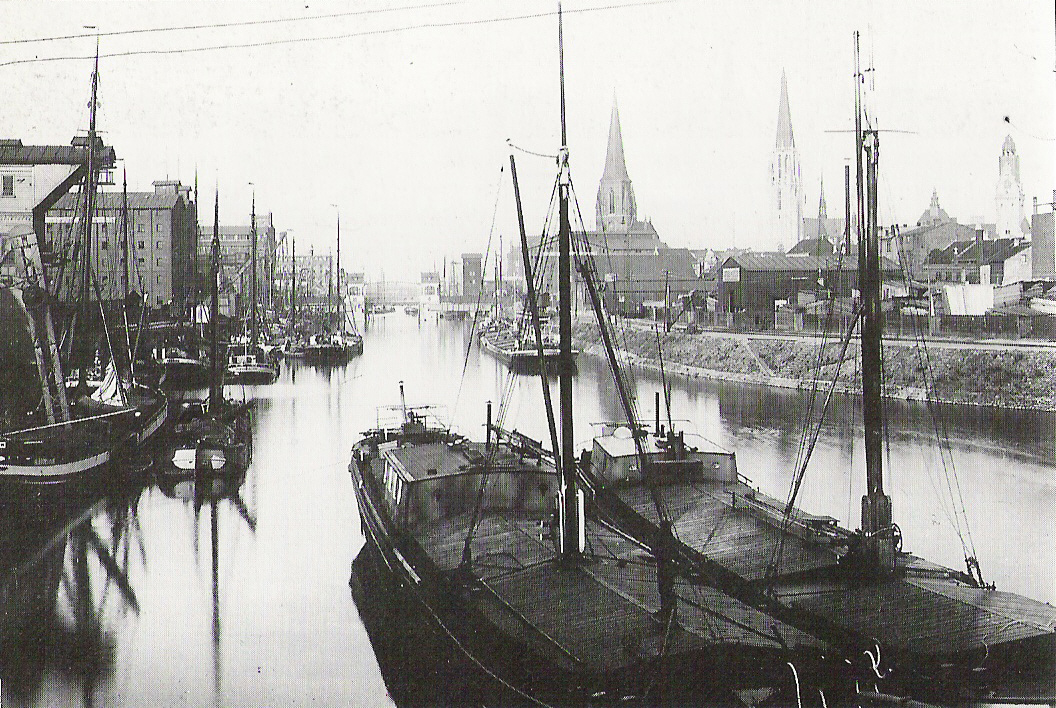
- Duisburg Inner Harbor around 1900
- Click on the map for a fullscreen view

Location
- Country: Germany
- Location: Duisburg
- Coordinates: 51°26′27″N 6°45′58″E

Details
- Type of harbour: Harbour
- Joins: Rhine River

Statistics
- Website www.duisport.de

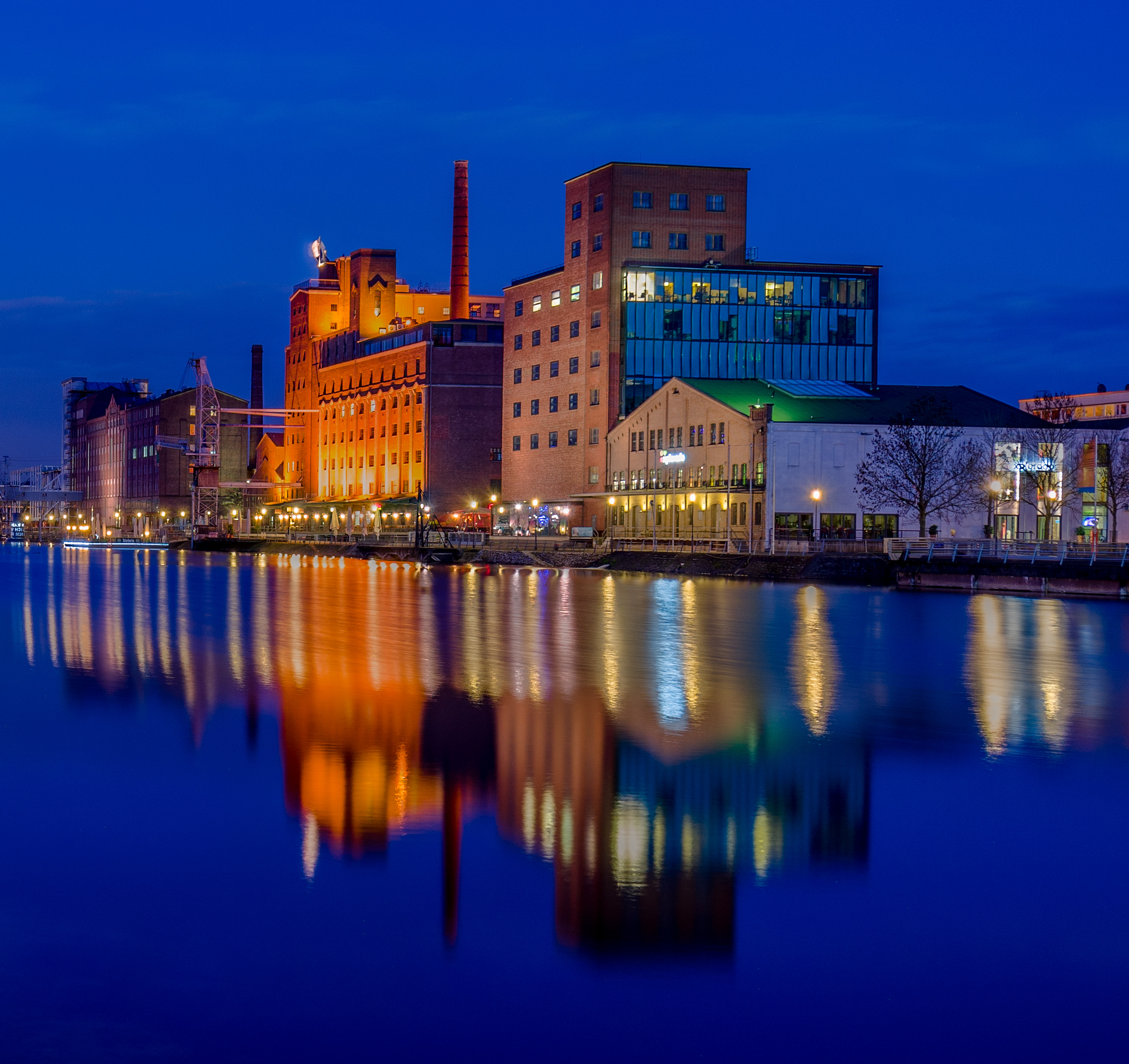
Warehouses of the Küppersmühle and Werhahnmühle

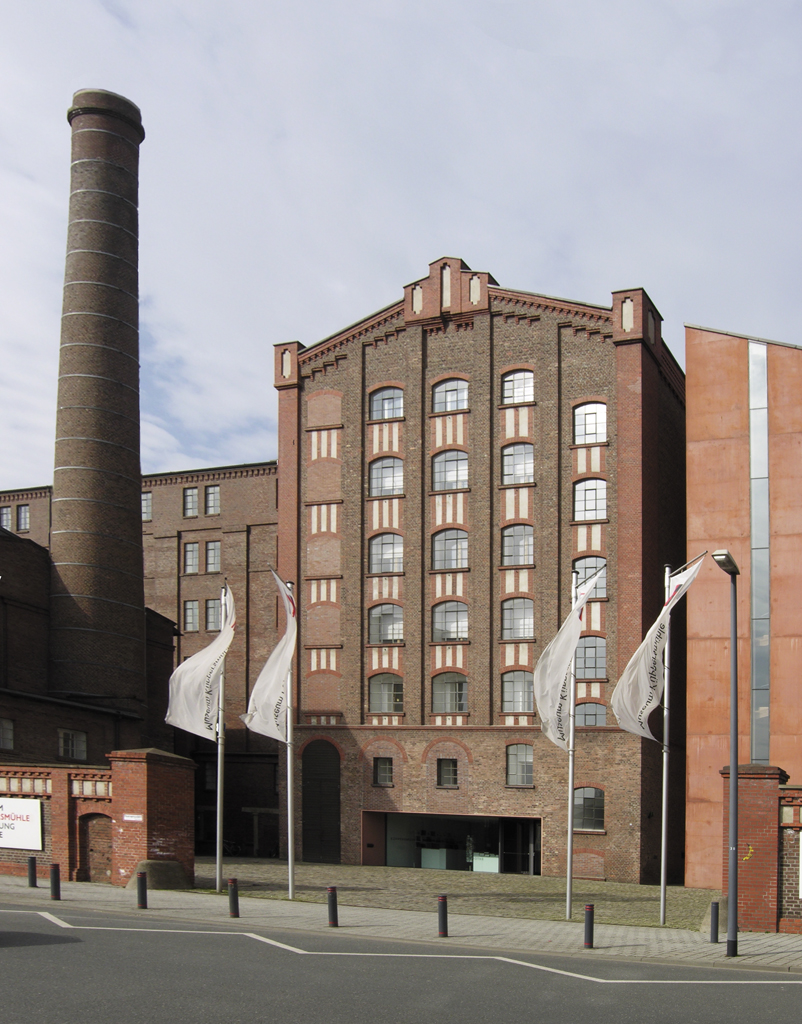
Museum Küppersmühle in the Inner Harbor

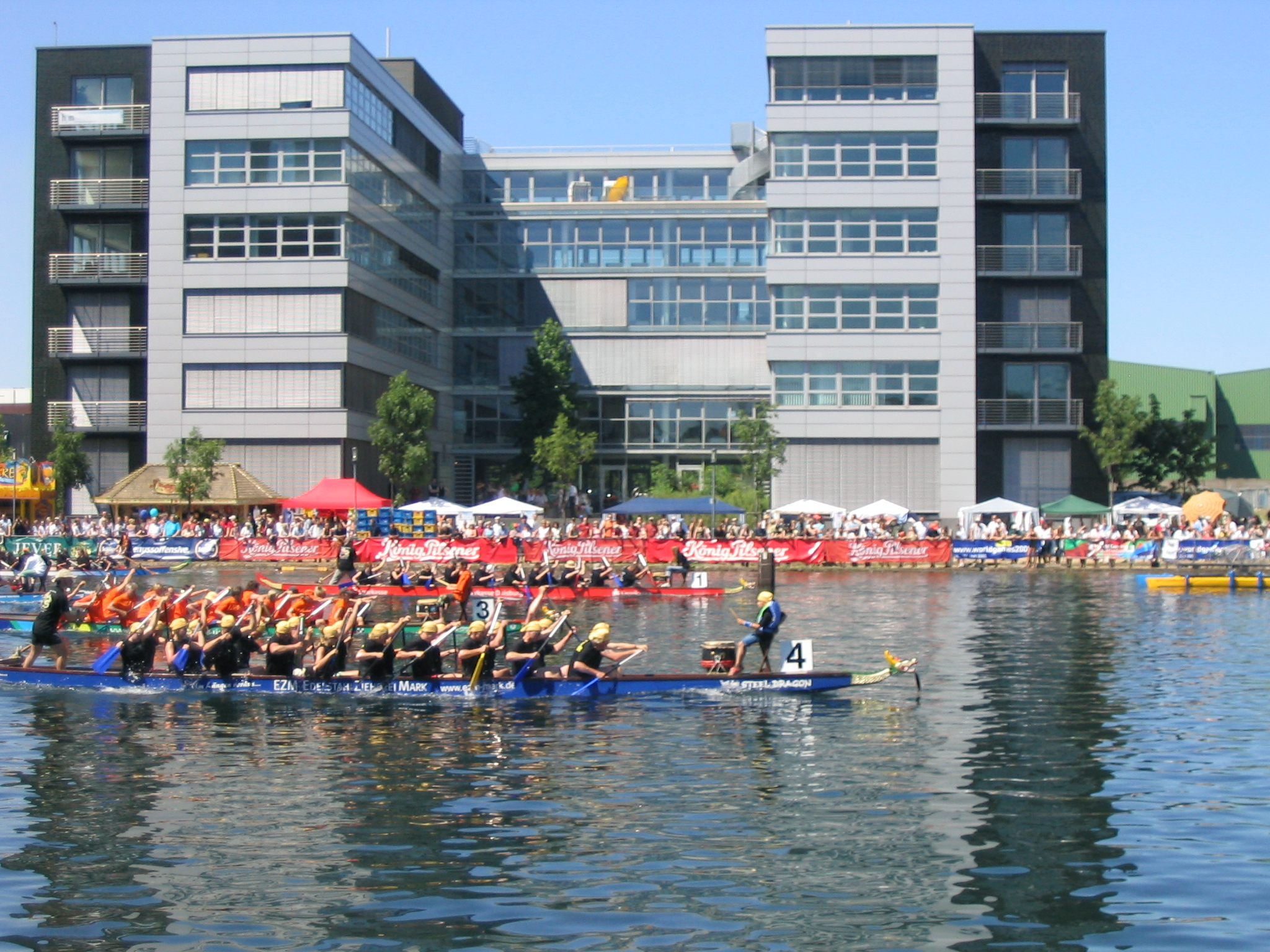
Dragon Boat-Regatta during the Inner Harbor Festival 2005

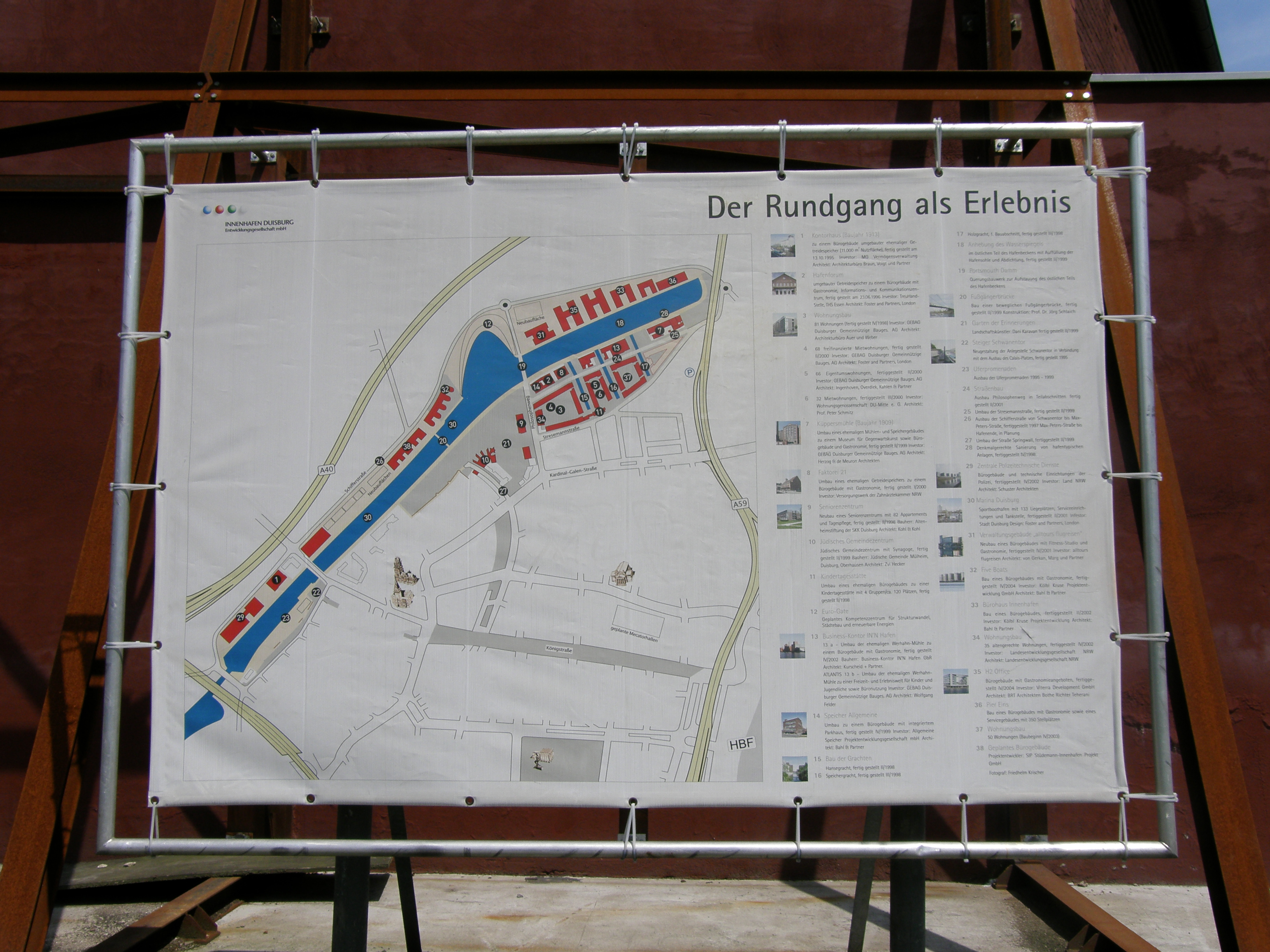
Plan of the Development

The Innenhafen (Inner Harbour) in Duisburg, Germany, is connected to the Rhine River, encompasses an area of 89 hectares (220 acres). For over a hundred years during the high point of the Industrial Revolution, it was the central harbour and trading point of the town. Since the mid-1960s, the importance of the harbour declined and it lay in a disused condition for 20 years, before plans for renovation were drawn up. This former industrial area has been fundamentally transformed, a process which started as a part of the International Building Exhibition Emscher Park (IBA) which ran from 1989 until 1999.

The basis for this model of development in the Ruhr district was delivered in 1994 by the British architect Norman Foster. Since then, the Inner Harbor has transformed itself into a district combining employment, housing, culture and water-based leisure activities. Today, the Inner Harbour is both industrial heritage and a main stop on the Route der Industriekultur.

== History ==
Where the Inner Harbour is today, the Rhine flowed many centuries ago. Up until the 5th century, the boundary of the Roman Empire ran through this locality. During the Middle Ages a Frankish regal court was built on the banks of the Rhine, today that place is occupied by the Rathaus. In the same area were to be found the old Duisburg town church, the Saviour Church, the market hall and the city walls.

According to recent research, around the year 1000 the Rhine shifted its course westwards. Duisburg found itself no longer lying directly on the Rhine; it remained connected to the river only through a "dead" arm of the Rhine for the following 400 years. As a result, this previously important trading town declined into a small agricultural settlement. It was only in the 19th century that an initiative to resurrect the connection to the Rhine proved successful. Initially, the Outer Harbour was dug from the Rhine in the west as far as the contemporary Marientor Bridge, to which an eastern extension was later built, the Inner Harbour. Early on, the timber industry established itself on the harbour, mining interest being a major customer for their products then, as modern production methods were able to reduce their space requirements, grain mills began to establish themselves in several locations, along with their warehouses for storage. They conferred on the Inner Harbour the nickname "bread basket of the Ruhr district", supplying the rapidly growing population in the district.

After the decline of the grain mills in the 1960s, the Inner Harbour lost its economic significance and was characterized primarily by warehousing. Nevertheless, the district still continued to block off access to the water from the city itself. The first steps in giving the inner harbour a new face were taken at the end of the 1980s with the opening up of city walls and the construction of a new living quarter on Corputiusplatz.

Within the framework of the IBA Emscher Park, which renovated the industrial areas of the Ruhr in an exemplary fashion, a transformation design for the entire Inner Harbour was launched. The water was to be reincorporated into the city, it was to be made freely accessible and produce an enhanced quality of living – and attract investors. Space for employment – especially in the service sector – for living, culture and leisure were to be integrated into the overall plan. In this sense, the industrial and historic "symbols" of the harbour were to be quite consciously retained.

== The Inner Harbour today ==
Highlights of the newly renovated quarter of the Inner Harbour are the Küppersmühle converted to an arts museum by Herzog & de Meuron, the Werhahnmühle, which following the departure of the Children's Museum ATLANTIS was used as a "Legoland Discovery Centre", the Cultural- and City History Museum, the "Garden of Remembrance" laid out by Dani Karavan as well as the Synagogue of the Jewish District of Duisburg-Mülheim/Ruhr-Oberhausen, designed by the architect Zvi Hecker.

Additionally, on the far side of the Garden a marina has been built complete with a Buckelbrücke ('Buckle bridge' – for pedestrians). It is intended to extend the marina into the adjacent Holzhafen.

A lively dining-scene has also developed. In addition to more than 15 restaurants and clubs, there are also owner-run bars and franchises.

== Progression of Developments ==
After a previous project had run into problems revolving around the awarding of the contract, 2008 should see an investor beginning the construction of Eurogate, a semi-elliptical multi-functional building with up to 10 floors and a floor area of about 35,000 m^{2} (380,000 sq ft). The design for this building, by Foster, follows the curvature of the Holzhafen. Works for reclamation of land on the bank hit the news when a crane overturned and burnt-out.

Foster has – under contract from the City Council – come up with a new master plan, for the western part of the Inner Harbour, bordering directly onto the Altstadt. This master plan foresees a transformation similar to that which has been carried out in the eastern section – which is itself still ongoing: A further area for a new building lies at the further end, near to the Küppersmühle. The Museum Küppersmühle has extension plans, following the need for more space due to the fusion of the Grothe und Ströher collections. Behind of the office building on the Northern bank, a park is envisaged. In order to coordinate the ideas of the planners regarding the Inner Harbour and the City Centre, the Innenhafen-Entwicklungsgesellschaft (Inner Harbour Development Society) will additionally manage the renovation of the entire City Centre.

As from 2010 the Land Archive of NRW will be based in the Upper Harbour. Up until now it has been based in Düsseldorf (Main Archive) and Brühl (Personenstandsarchiv Brühl). In December 2007 the Austrian architects Ortner und Ortner received the commission for converting a listed storage building from the 1930s.

== Views ==
=== Pictures ===
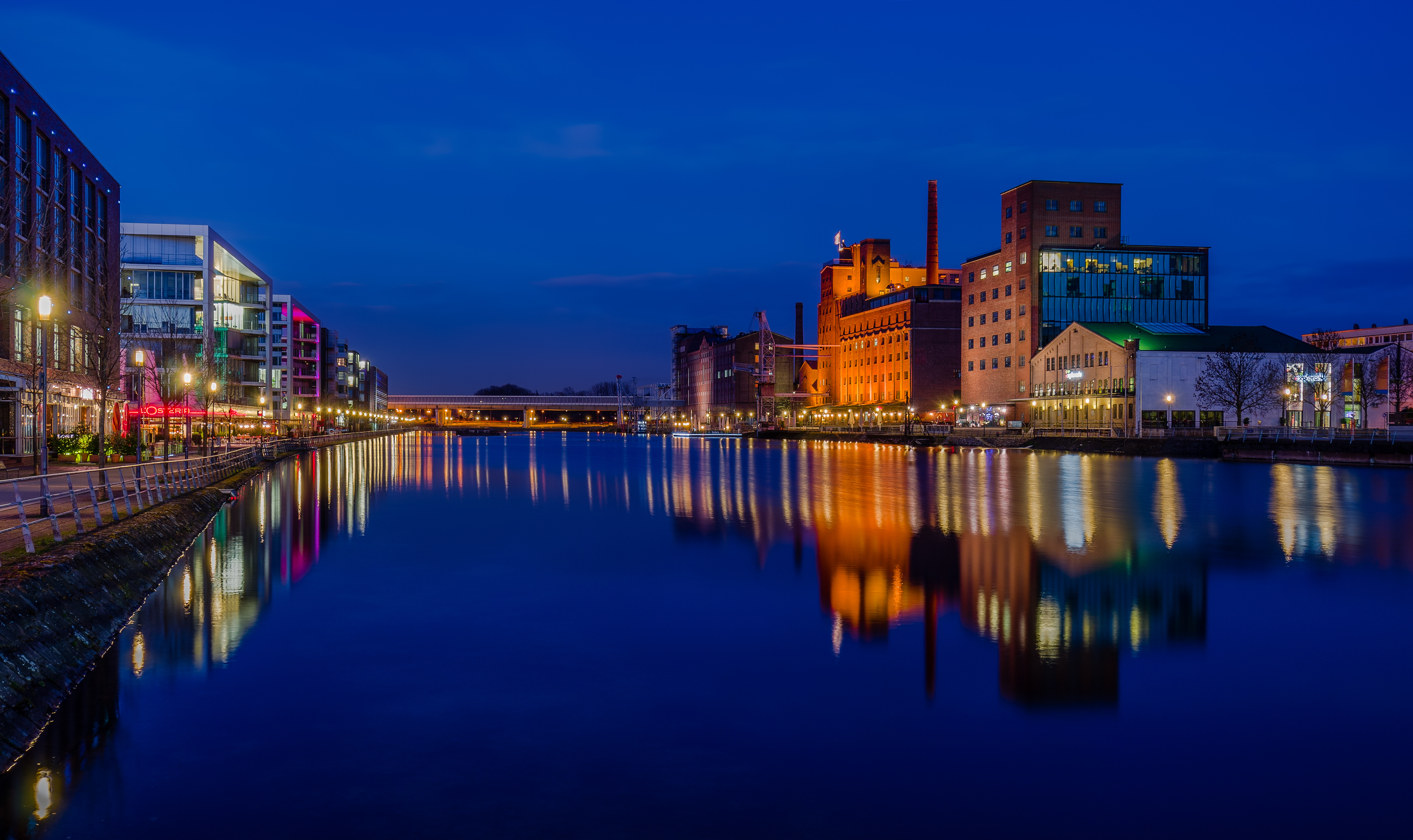
Inner Harbour at Blue Hour

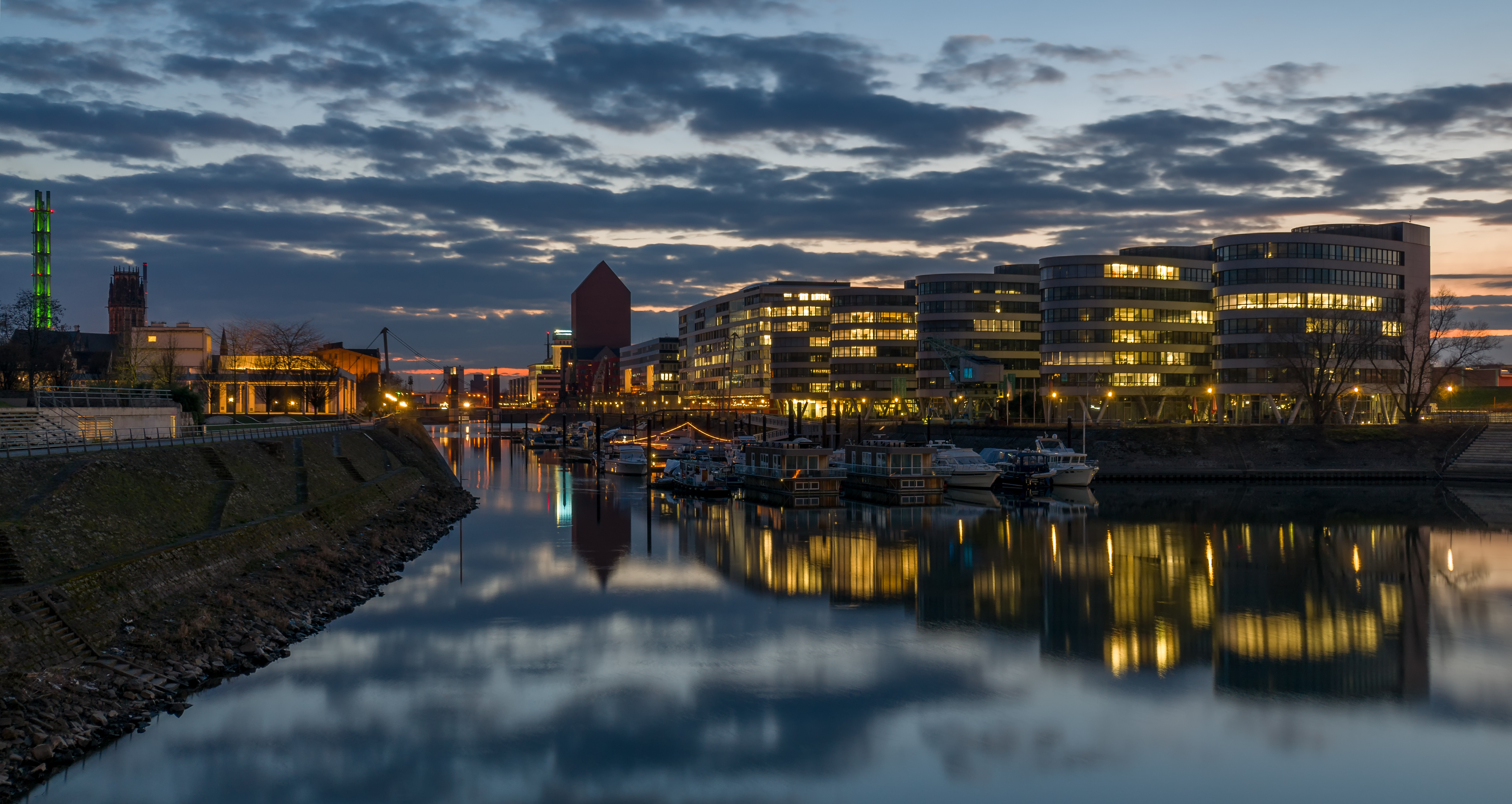
Marina and office buildings at Blue Hour

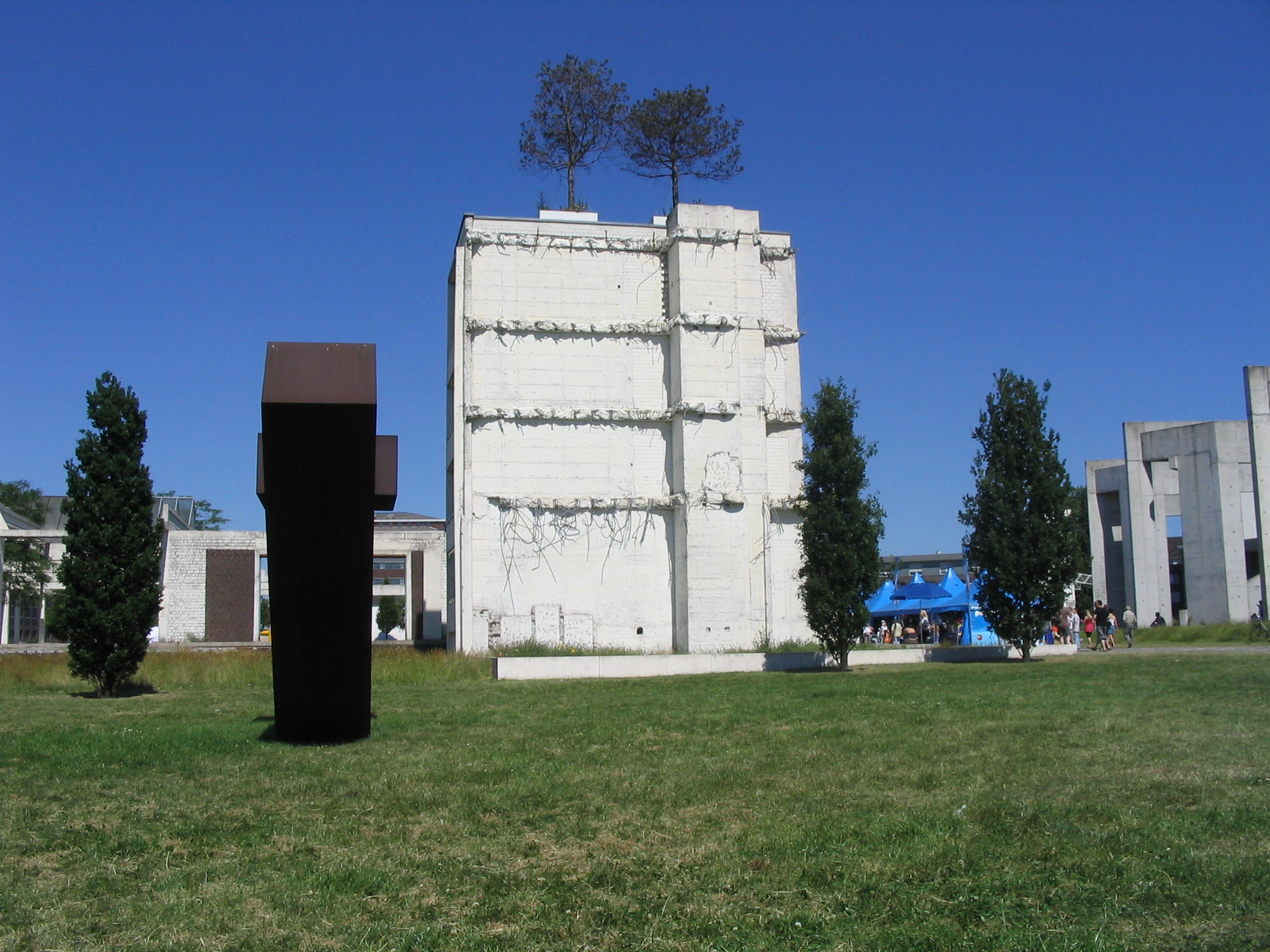
Garden of Remembrance

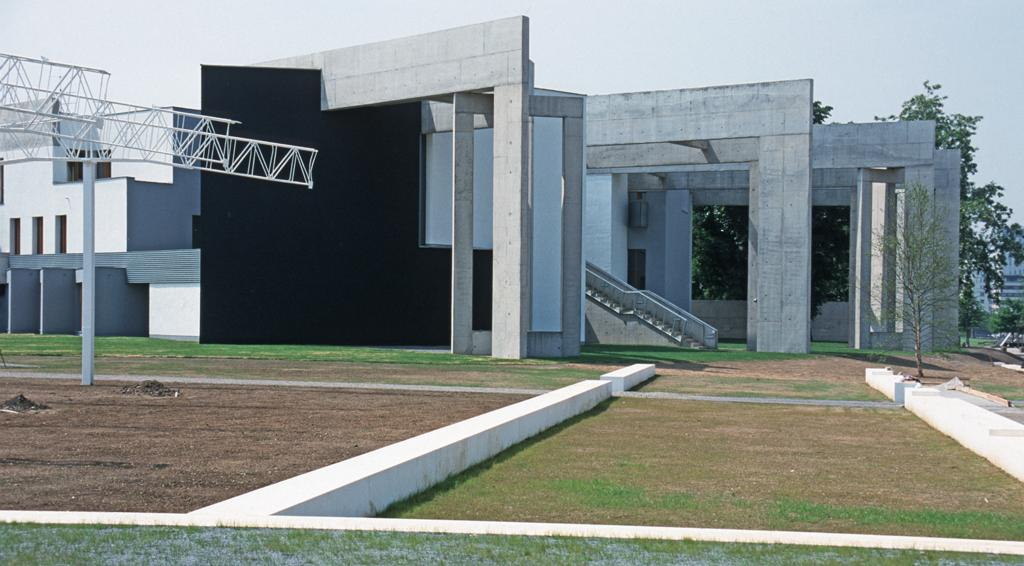
District Center of the Jewish District Duisburg-Mülheim/Ruhr-Oberhausen, in the Garden of Remembrance

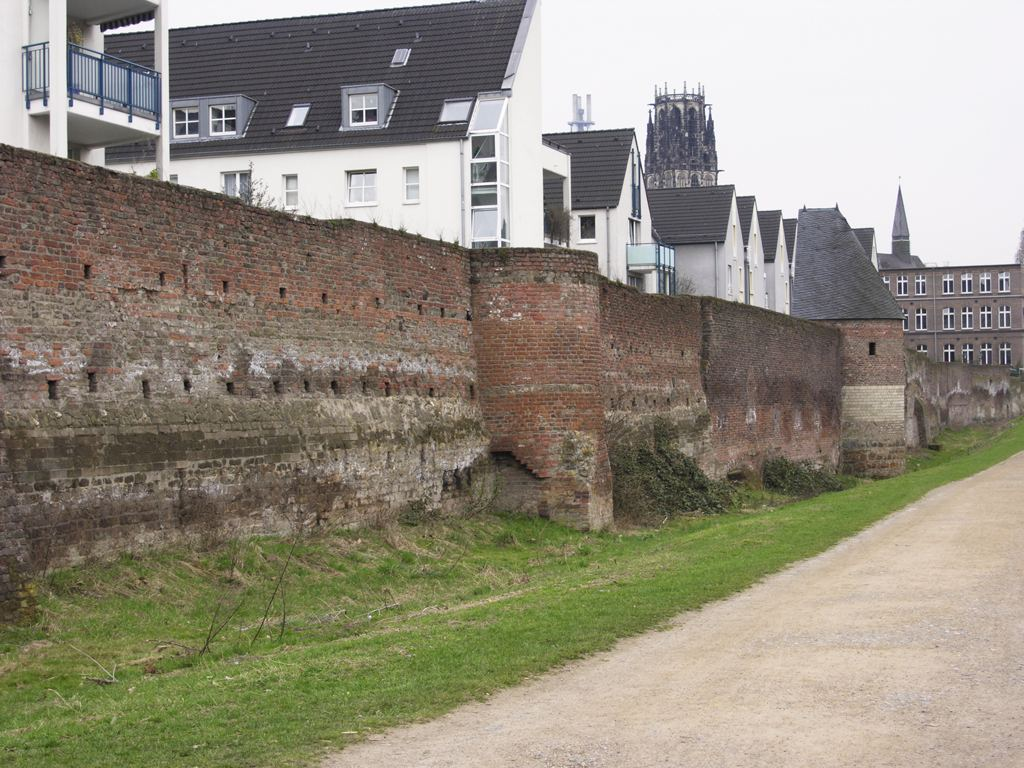
Section of the historic city walls. City walls adjacent to the Altstadtpark in the Inner Harbor

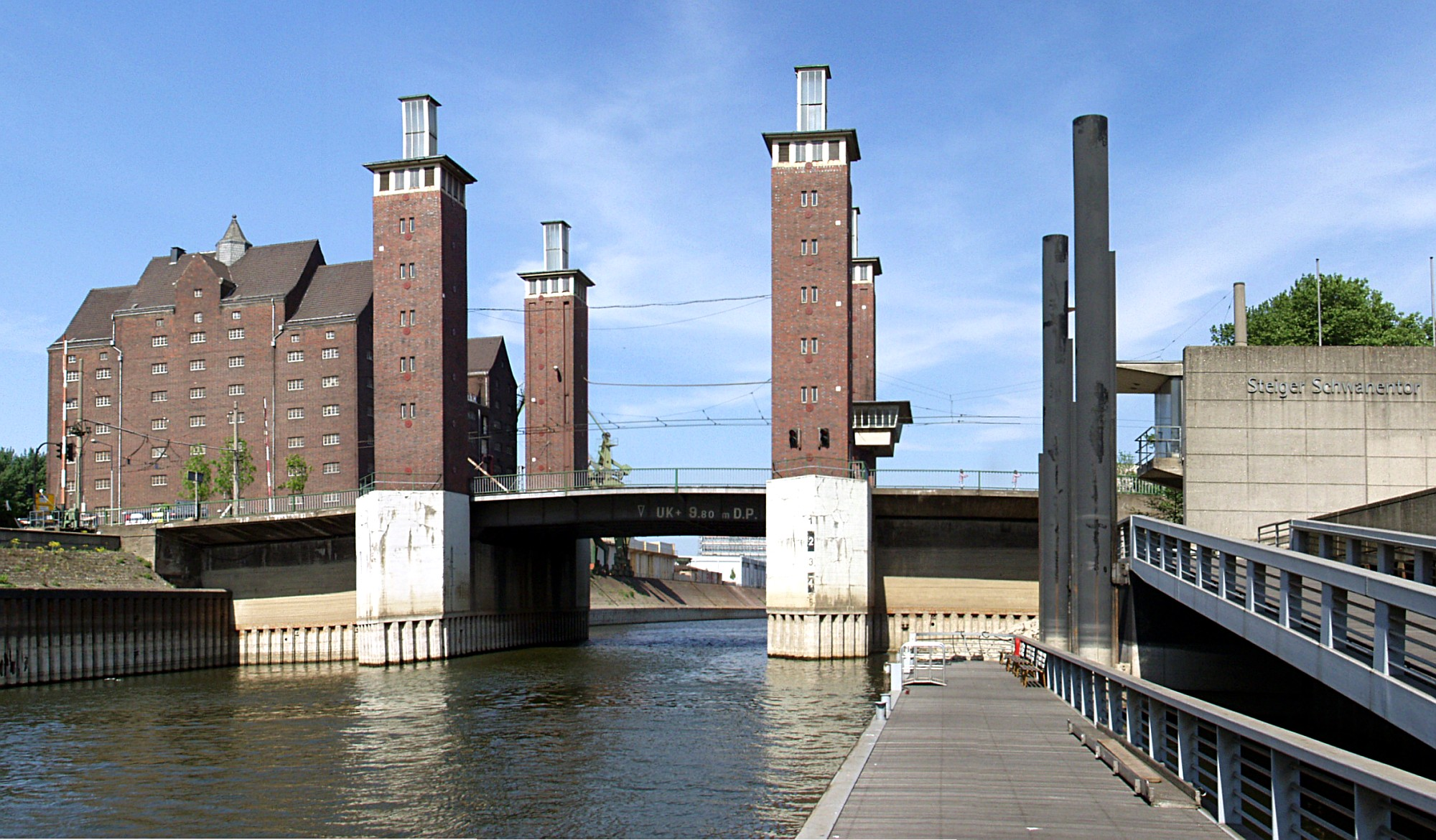
Schwanentorbrücke: a moving bridge; to the left of it, the RWSG-warehouse, which will be extended and used for the Land Archive.

=== Panorama ===
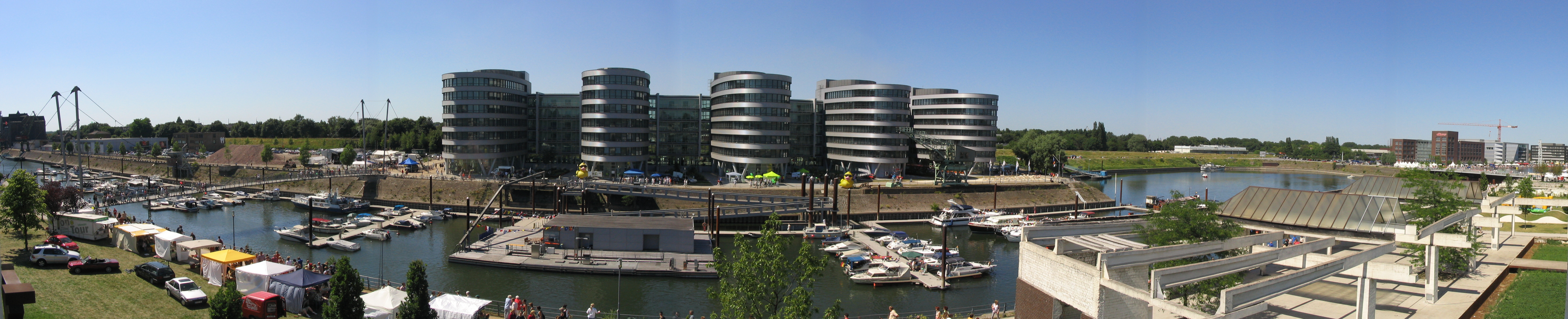
View of the Marina (left hand) and the "Five Boats" office complex, designed by the British architect Nicholas Grimshaw. On the right hand you can see the Holzhafen, which will be encircled by a projected hotel complex called Eurogate. The free space shown in the photograph to the left of Grimshaw's 'boat building' does not actually exist any more (used for the "Hitachi Power Office").
