= Westphalian Open-Air Museum =

Westphalian Open-Air Museum (German: Westfälisches Freilichtmuseum) may refer to:

- Detmold Open-air Museum
- Hagen Open-air Museum
