= Klavier-Festival Ruhr =

German piano music festival

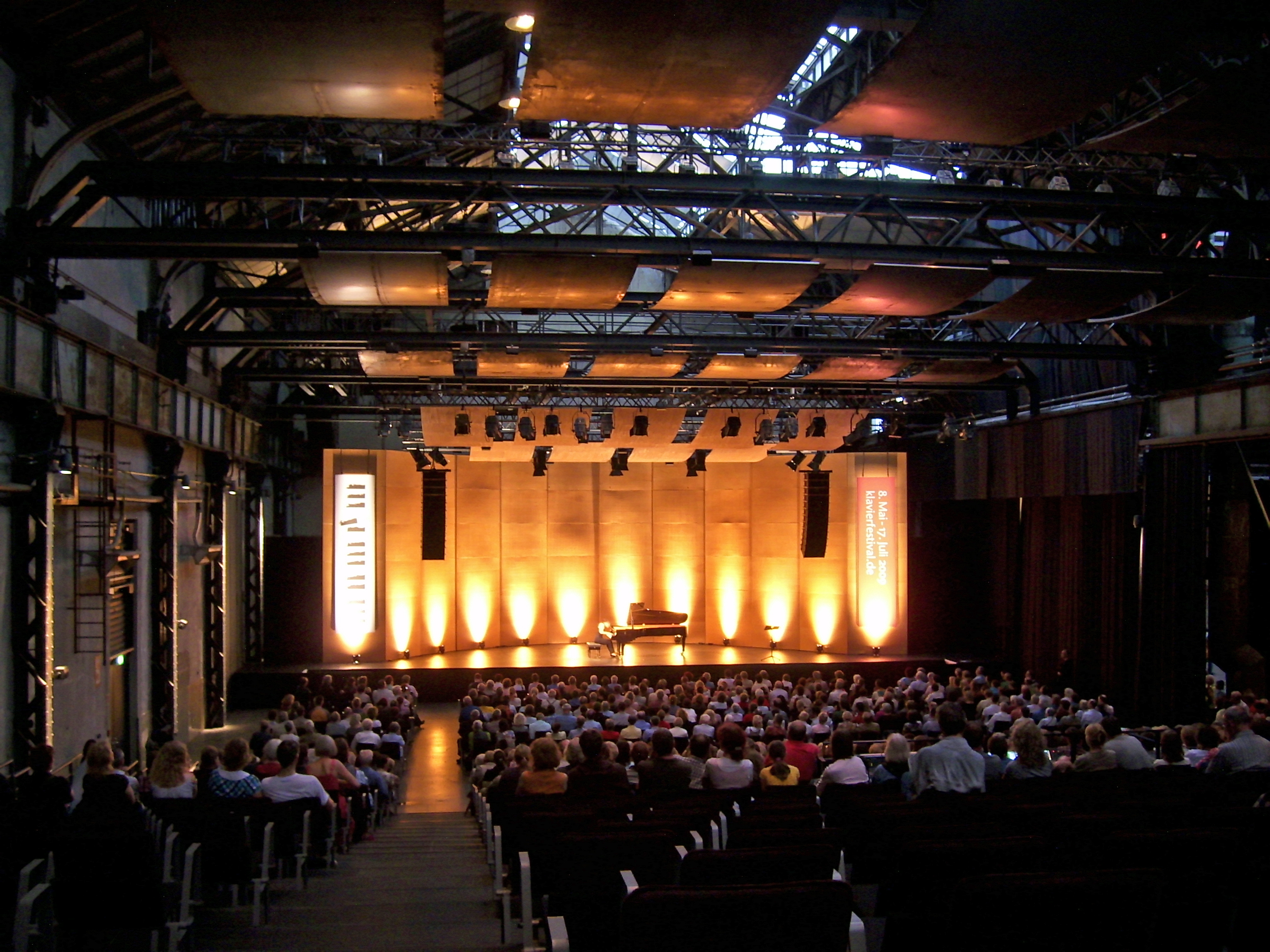
Event at the Jahrhunderthalle (Bochum)

The Klavier-Festival Ruhr (also Klavierfestival Ruhr) is an annual festival of piano music, which takes place in the area of the Ruhr in Germany. The festival runs from around the beginning of May for three months. The organizer of the festival is the Stiftung Klavier-Festival Ruhr, and the art leader is Franz Xaver Ohnesorg. The festival was founded in July 1988.

== Festival details ==
For three months, starting in May, daily classical music or jazz pieces are performed at different locations by internationally known pianists as well as newcomers. The performance locations include classical music halls (such as Konzerthaus Dortmund, Musiktheater im Revier, Gelsenkirchen, Tonhalle Düsseldorf); the castle Schloss Herten; several museums (one being the Westphalian State Museum of Art and Cultural History) and parks like the Landschaftspark Duisburg-Nord. Locations include some unconventional venues as well, including the Zollverein Coal Mine Industrial Complex (a World Heritage Site).

Pianists at this festival are newcomers, but also well known artists like Alice Sara Ott, Elisabeth Leonskaja, Fazıl Say, Hélène Grimaud, Pierre-Laurent Aimard, Plamena Mangova or Lang Lang.

The festival is sponsored by several locally based Industrial companies. Klavierfestival Ruhr organizes around 80 concerts, and has a yearly budget of roughly one million Euro. The festival hosts about 60,000 visitors yearly.

The focus of the festival 2018 was French music.
