= LWL-Preußenmuseum Minden =

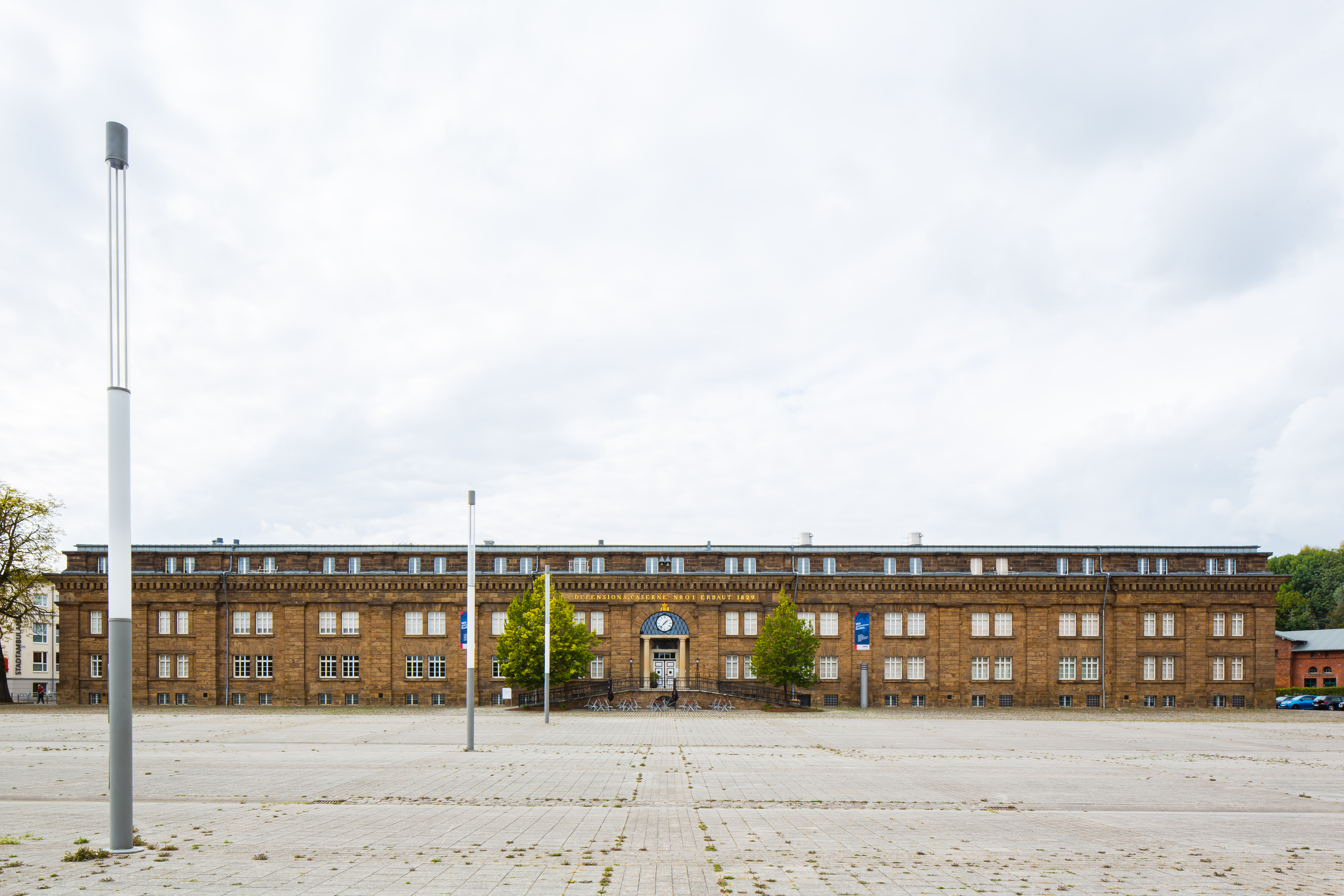
- The Defensionskaserne, home of the museum

- Location within Germany
- Established: 1999
- Location: Minden, North Rhine-Westphalia, Germany
- Coordinates: 52°17′12″N 8°54′34″E
- Type: History museum
- Director: Sylvia Necker
- Owner: Landschaftsverband Westfalen-Lippe (LWL)
- Website: www.lwl-preussenmuseum.de

The LWL Prussian Museum (Preußenmuseum) is a history museum located in the East Westphalian town of Minden in North Rhine-Westphalia. Since 2016, it has been part of the network of LWL museums run by the Regional Association of Westphalia-Lippe (Landschaftsverband Westfalen-Lippe). The museum is housed in the former defence barracks of Minden Fortress on Simeonsplatz, located in a military suburb of Minden built after 1815, which still features numerous buildings today. The square is surrounded by what is now known as the Minden Glacis.

Since August 2019, historian and exhibition curator Sylvia Necker has been in charge of the LWL Prussia Museum in Minden. The LWL Prussia Museum is currently preparing for the opening of its permanent exhibition, “Potzblitz Prussia!”

== History of the museum and its collections ==
The Neoclassical building, dating from 1829, underwent renovation and conversion from 1995 onwards, enabling the museum to open in 1999 as the Westphalian branch of the Prussian Museum of North Rhine-Westphalia. There was a second branch, the Prussian Museum in Wesel. Covering over 1,500 m^{2}, the exhibition focused on the history of Prussia in Westphalia, with the garrison town of Minden highlighted for its role as a pivotal link between the western territories and the heartlands of Prussia. On display were paintings, porcelain, textile objects, uniforms, medals and objects from various thematic and everyday contexts. In addition to the permanent exhibition, there were several annual temporary exhibitions on historical and political themes, or on art and cultural history.

The museum, together with its second site in Wesel, was funded by the Prussian Museum NRW Foundation. The foundation's members include: the State of North Rhine-Westphalia, the Regional Associations of Westphalia-Lippe and the Rhineland, the Prussian Cultural Heritage Foundation, as well as the towns of Wesel and Minden and their respective districts of Wesel and Minden-Lübbecke. The museum's recognised charitable support association, the ‘Gesellschaft zur Förderung des Preußen-Museums NRW in Minden e. V.’, is open to all citizens for membership. It provides particular support for special exhibitions and the expansion of the collection.

Due to financial difficulties faced by the foundation – resulting from lower interest income on its assets, the non-payment of grants from the state of North Rhine-Westphalia, and repayment claims from one of the regional associations and the districts – discussions have been ongoing since 2010 regarding a change in the museum's focus and the exploration of alternative funding options.

On 1 January 2016, the Prussian Museum in Minden was taken over by the Regional Association of Westphalia-Lippe. The museum reopened in spring 2020 as part of the ‘Make way, the museum’s coming’ programme.

With its takeover by the Regional Council of Westphalia-Lippe, the museum is adopting a new concept. Since 2016, a new permanent exhibition has been under construction in the basement of the building's right wing. It has less space available (400 square metres instead of around 1,000 square metres) and is to be incorporated into the planning work for the reopening. The Landschaftsverband Westfalen-Lippe is providing 900,000 euros for the ‘reorientation’ of the Defensionskaserne Minden.

The museum serves as the coordinating body for the ‘Prussia in Westphalia’ network, which was founded in 2017. This collaborative initiative now comprises over 60 museums, local history societies, archives and tourism partners. The network brings to life the traces of Westphalia's more than 200-year-long Prussian influence.

Exhibition posters

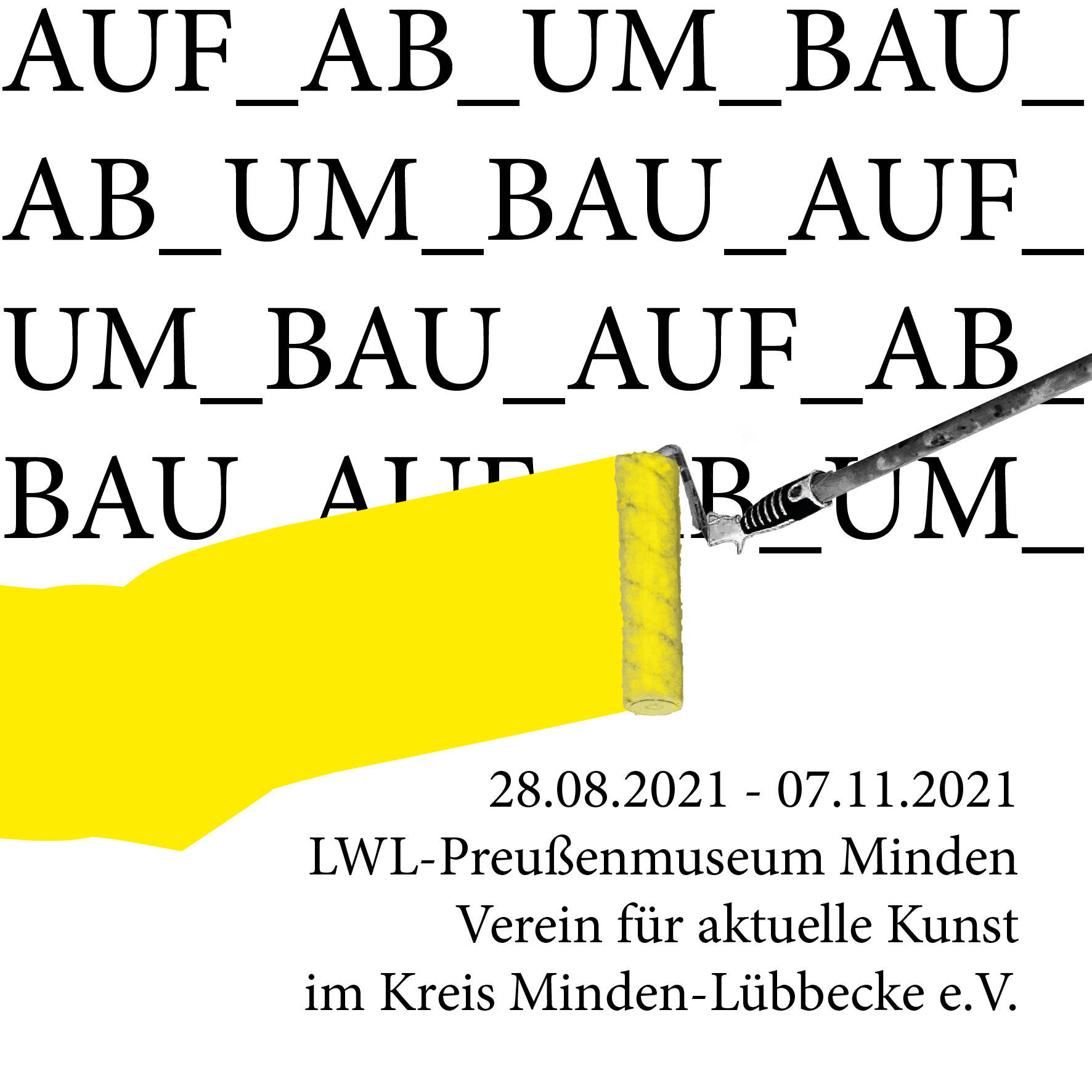
„AUF_AB_UM_BAU“ 2021

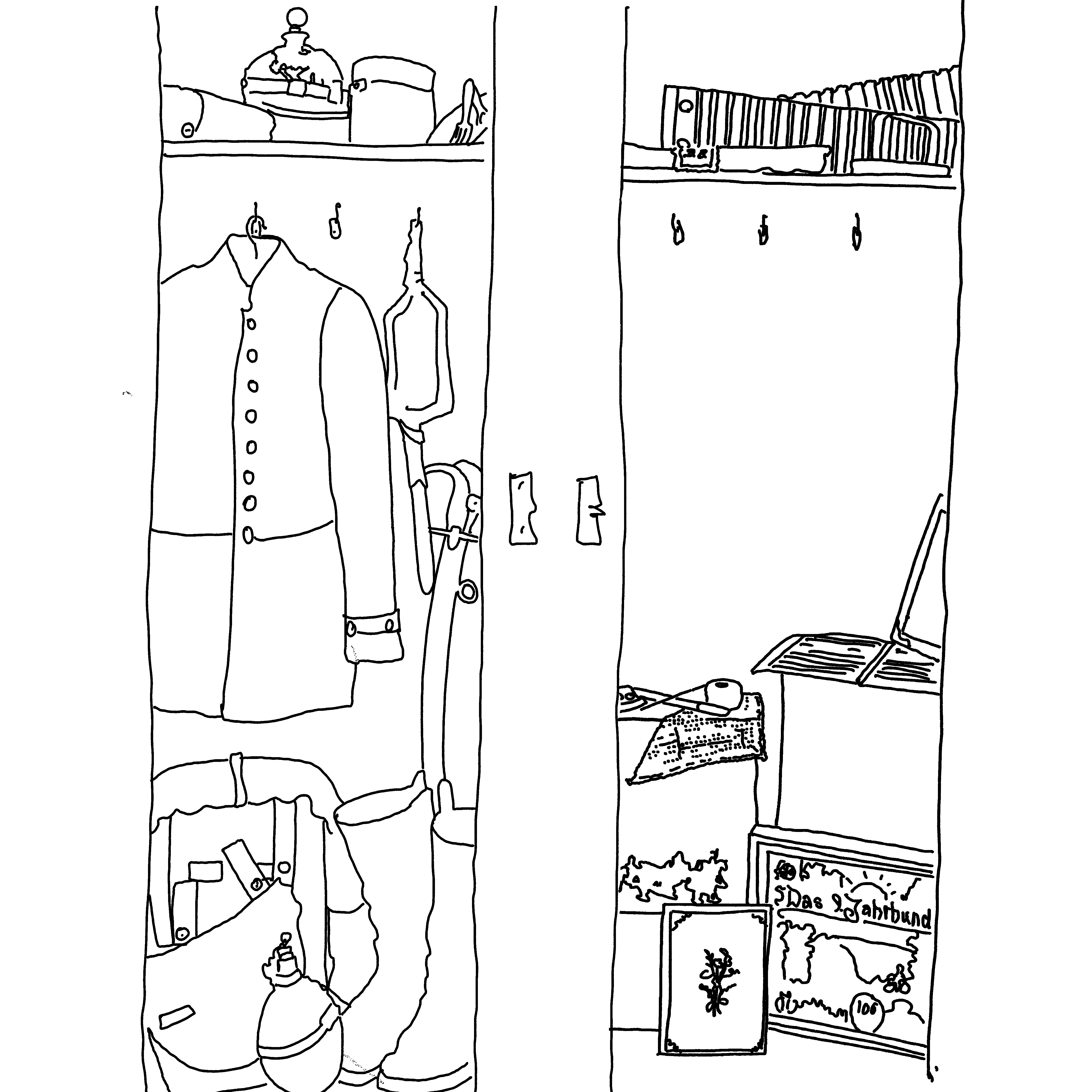
„Quartier-Wechsel“ 2023
