= Landschaftsverband Westfalen-Lippe =

Local authority in North Rhine-Westphalia, Germany

- Logo of the LWL

Agency overview
- Formed: 1953
- Jurisdiction: North Rhine-Westphalia
- Headquarters: Münster, Germany
- Employees: approx. 20,000
- Annual budget: €4.0 billion (2024)
- Agency executive: Georg Lunemann, Director
- Website: www.lwl.org/en/

The Landschaftsverband Westfalen-Lippe (LWL), English: Regional Association of Westphalia-Lippe) is a higher-level local authority in the German state of North Rhine-Westphalia. Based in Münster, it serves as a regional provider of social welfare, healthcare, and cultural services for the approximately 8 million people living in the historical regions of Westphalia and Lippe.

== Regional associations in North Rhine-Westphalia ==
In the administrative structure of North Rhine-Westphalia (NRW), the two Landschaftsverbände (LWL for Westphalia and LVR for the Rhineland) occupy a middle tier. Such a tier exists only in the state of NRW. They perform tasks that exceed the capacity of individual cities or districts but do not fall under the direct jurisdiction of the state government.

They can be seen as regional cooperatives. While the state government in Düsseldorf handles sovereign tasks (like policing or education), the LWL operates as a service provider for its member municipalities, focusing on specialised social services and regional identity.

== History and organisation ==
Map of the combined Westphalian-Lippe region

The LWL's roots date back to the 19th-century provincial self-administration of the Province of Westphalia within the state of Prussia. After World War II and the founding of North Rhine-Westphalia in 1946, the association was formally established in its current form in 1953 to preserve the regional traditions and administrative autonomy of the Westphalian and Lippe regions. Lippe used to be one of the German states before it was added to North Rhine-Westphalia in 1947.

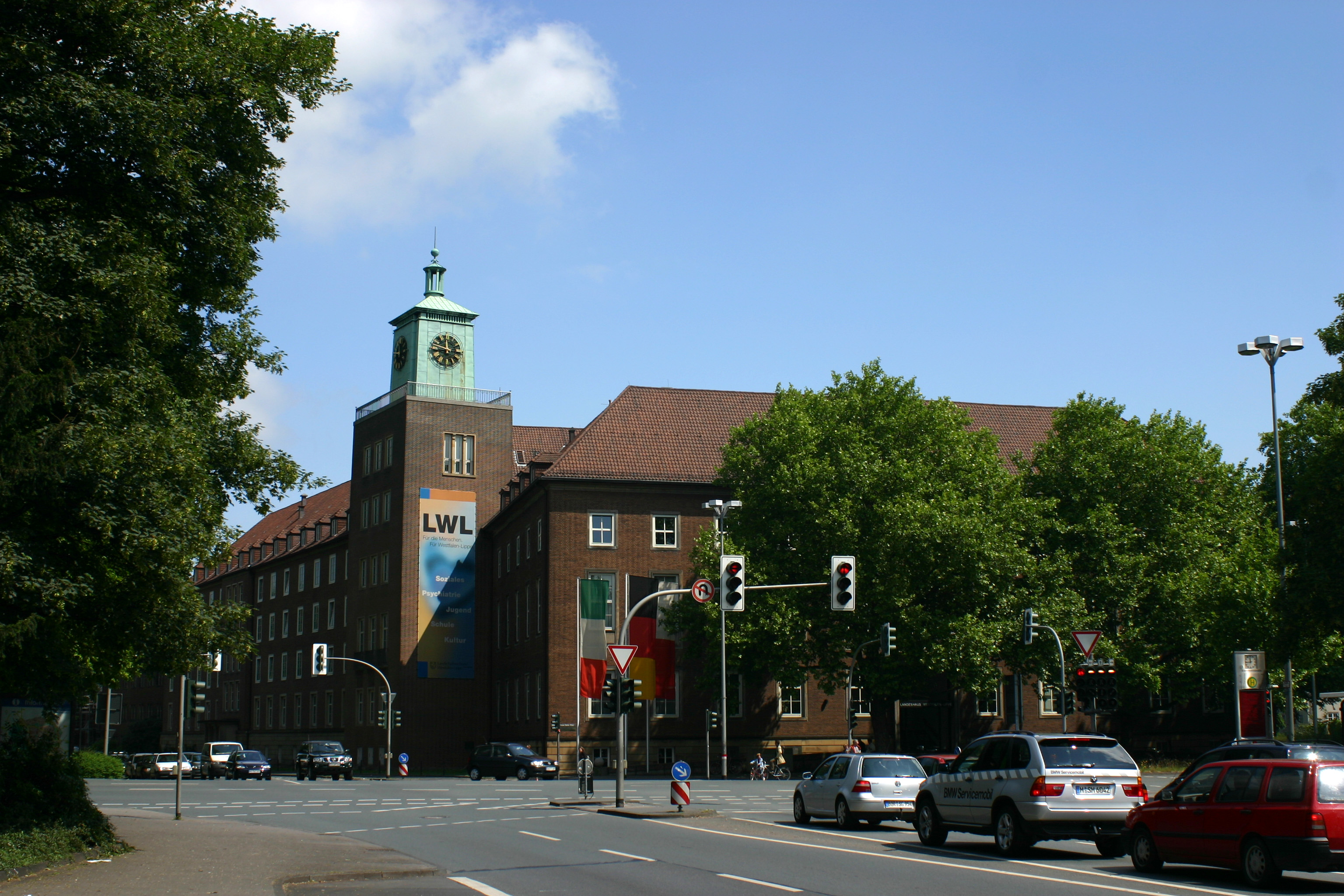
Landeshaus in Münster, seat of the LWL

Unlike a typical city council, the LWL is governed by the Westphalia-Lippe Regional Assembly (Landschaftsversammlung Westfalen-Lippe), also referred to as the "Westphalian Parliament". Its members are not elected directly by the inhabitants but are delegated by the councils of the member districts and independent cities.

== Activities and institutions ==
The LWL operates with an annual budget of several billion euros, funded primarily by a levy from its member municipalities and state grants. It has more than 150 facilities, responsible for services in the fields of social welfare, culture, youth and education, forensic psychiatry and general psychiatry.

=== LWL health and clinics ===
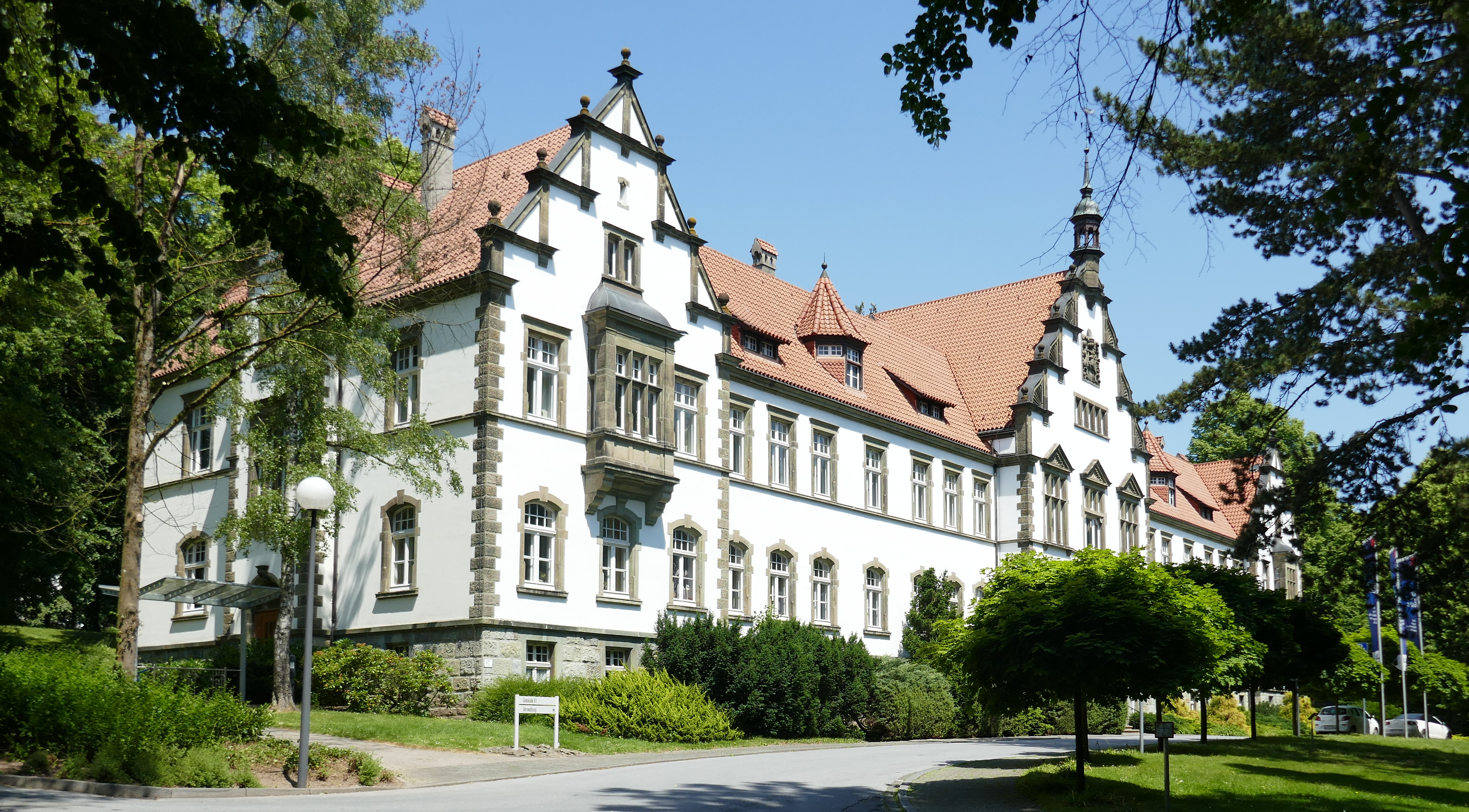
LWL-Klinik Warstein

The Psychiatry Network of the LWL is one of the largest providers of mental health services in Germany. It operates numerous specialised hospitals, nursing homes, and rehabilitation centres:

- LWL Clinics (Psychiatry, Psychosomatics, Psychotherapy)
  - LWL-Klinik Dortmund
  - LWL-Klinik Hemer
  - LWL-Klinik Herford
  - LWL-Klinik Lippstadt
  - LWL-Klinik Lengerich
  - LWL-Klinik Marsberg
  - LWL-Klinik Münster
  - LWL-Klinik Paderborn
  - LWL-Klinik Warstein
  - LWL-Universitätsklinik Bochum
  - LWL-Universitätsklinik Hamm (child and adolescent psychiatry)
- Forensic Psychiatric Clinics
  - LWL-Zentrum für Forensische Psychiatrie Lippstadt
  - LWL-Therapiezentrum für Forensische Psychiatrie Marsberg
  - LWL-Klinik für Forensische Psychiatrie Dortmund
  - LWL-Klinik Schloss Haldem

=== Museums and cultural sites ===
The Landschaftsverband Westfalen-Lippe (LWL) operates a network of around 18 museums and several cultural sites across the region of Westphalia-Lippe. These institutions focus on industrial heritage, art, history, and natural sciences.

==== Industrial heritage museums ====
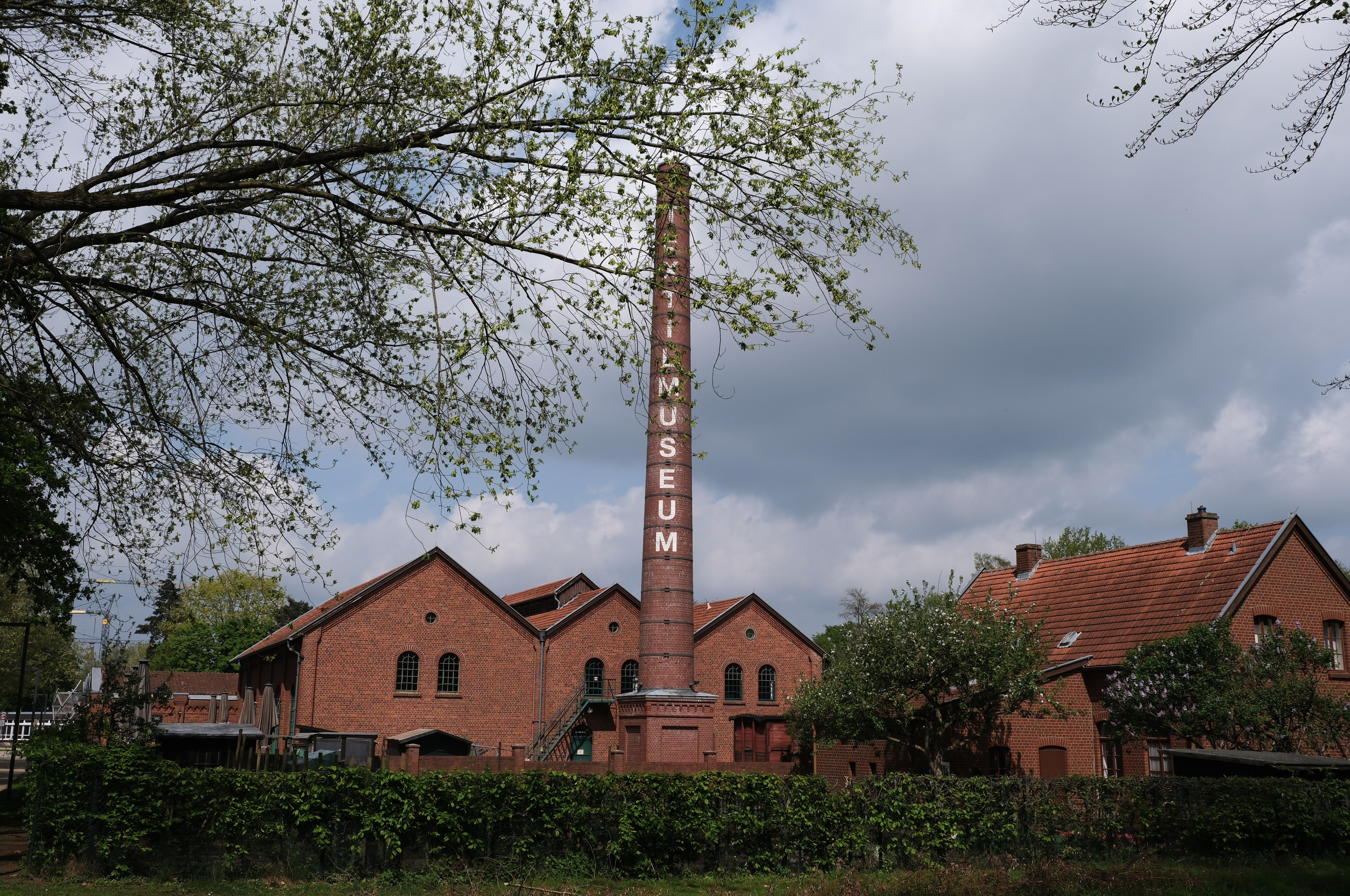
LWL Museum for the history if the textile industry, Bocholt (Kreis Borken)

The LWL's industrial heritage sites are managed under a decentralized museum structure, presenting the region's industrial history at original production sites:

- LWL-Museum Zeche Zollern (Dortmund) – A former coal mine known for its Art Nouveau architecture.
- LWL-Museum Schiffshebewerk Henrichenburg (Waltrop) – A historic boat lift dating from 1899.
- LWL-Museum Henrichshütte (Hattingen) – A former ironworks and blast furnace site.
- LWL-Museum Textilwerk (Bocholt) – A textile museum with spinning and weaving facilities at two locations.
- LWL-Museum Ziegelei Lage (Lage) – A historic brickworks museum.
- LWL-Museum Glashütte Gernheim (Petershagen) – A glass production site featuring a historic cone-shaped furnace tower.
- LWL-Museum Zeche Hannover (Bochum) – A former coal mine site.
- LWL-Museum Zeche Nachtigall (Witten) – An early coal mining site located in the Ruhr area.

==== Museums of art, history and culture ====
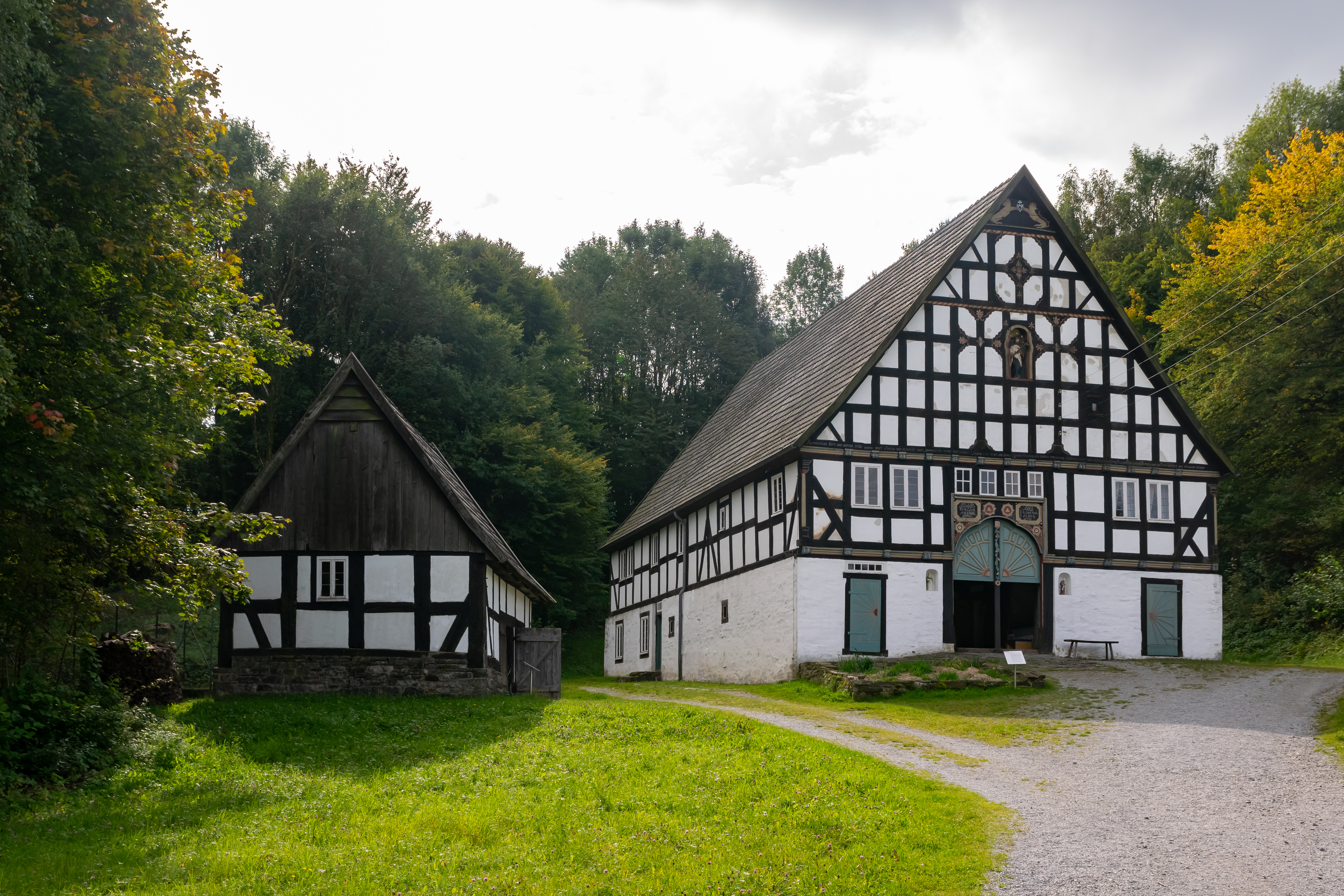
Open-air Museum in Detmold, former state of Lippe

The LWL operates several regional museums covering art, archaeology, and natural history:

- LWL-Museum für Kunst und Kultur (Münster) – The central museum for art and cultural history in Westphalia.
- LWL-Museum für Archäologie und Kultur (Herne) – Museum for archaeology.
- LWL-Museum in der Kaiserpfalz (Paderborn) – Located on the archaeological site of a medieval imperial palace.
- LWL-Römermuseum (Haltern am See) – Situated at the site of a former Roman military camp.
- LWL-Freilichtmuseum Detmold – Germany's largest open-air museum, focusing on rural cultural history.
- LWL-Freilichtmuseum Hagen – An open-air museum dedicated to historic crafts and technology.
- LWL-Museum für Naturkunde (Münster) – A natural history museum including a planetarium.
- LWL-Preußenmuseum Minden – A museum exploring the history of Prussia in the Westphalia region.
- LWL-Museum Kloster Dalheim (Lichtenau) – A museum dedicated to European monastic culture.
- LWL-Museum auf Schloss Cappenberg (Selm) – An exhibition venue in a former monastery complex.

==== Visitor centres ====
In addition to major museums, the LWL maintains several historic monuments and visitor centres:

- Kaiser-Wilhelm-Denkmal – A national monument with an integrated visitor centre.
- LWL-Besucherzentrum Kahler Asten – A visitor centre focusing on the natural landscape of the Sauerland region.

=== LWL schools ===
The LWL is the administrative body for 35 special schools (Förderschulen) for pupils with specific needs that cannot be met by standard local schools:

- Schools for Sensory Impairment (Vision/Hearing), e.g., Moritz-von-Büren-Schule, for the hearing impaired (Dortmund), Pauline-Schule, for the visually impaired (Paderborn).
- Schools for Physical and Motor Development, e.g., LWL-Schule in Bochum, LWL-Christoph-Schlingensief-Schule (Oberhausen).
- Schools for Mental and Emotional Development. Distributed across all major districts to ensure regional coverage.

=== Other institutions ===
- LWL-Archivamt für Westfalen: advice and support for municipal and private archives.
- LWL-Medienzentrum für Westfalen: providing educational media and historical film/photo archives.
- LWL-Landeshaus: the administrative headquarters in Münster.

== Member authorities ==
The LWL area comprises 18 rural districts (Kreise) and 9 independent cities (kreisfreie Städte):

=== Independent cities ===
- Bielefeld
- Bochum
- Bottrop
- Dortmund
- Gelsenkirchen
- Hagen
- Hamm
- Herne
- Münster

=== Rural districts ===
District	Capital
Ennepe-Ruhr-Kreis	Schwelm
Gütersloh	Gütersloh
Herford	Herford
Hochsauerlandkreis	Meschede
Höxter	Höxter
Lippe	Detmold
Märkischer Kreis	Lüdenscheid
Olpe	Olpe
Paderborn	Paderborn
Recklinghausen	Recklinghausen
Siegen-Wittgenstein	Siegen
Soest	Soest
Steinfurt	Steinfurt
Unna	Unna
Viersen	Viersen
Warendorf	Warendorf
Wesel	Wesel
