= Schloss Herten =

Castle in Germany

Coordinates: 51°35′30″N 7°07′49″E

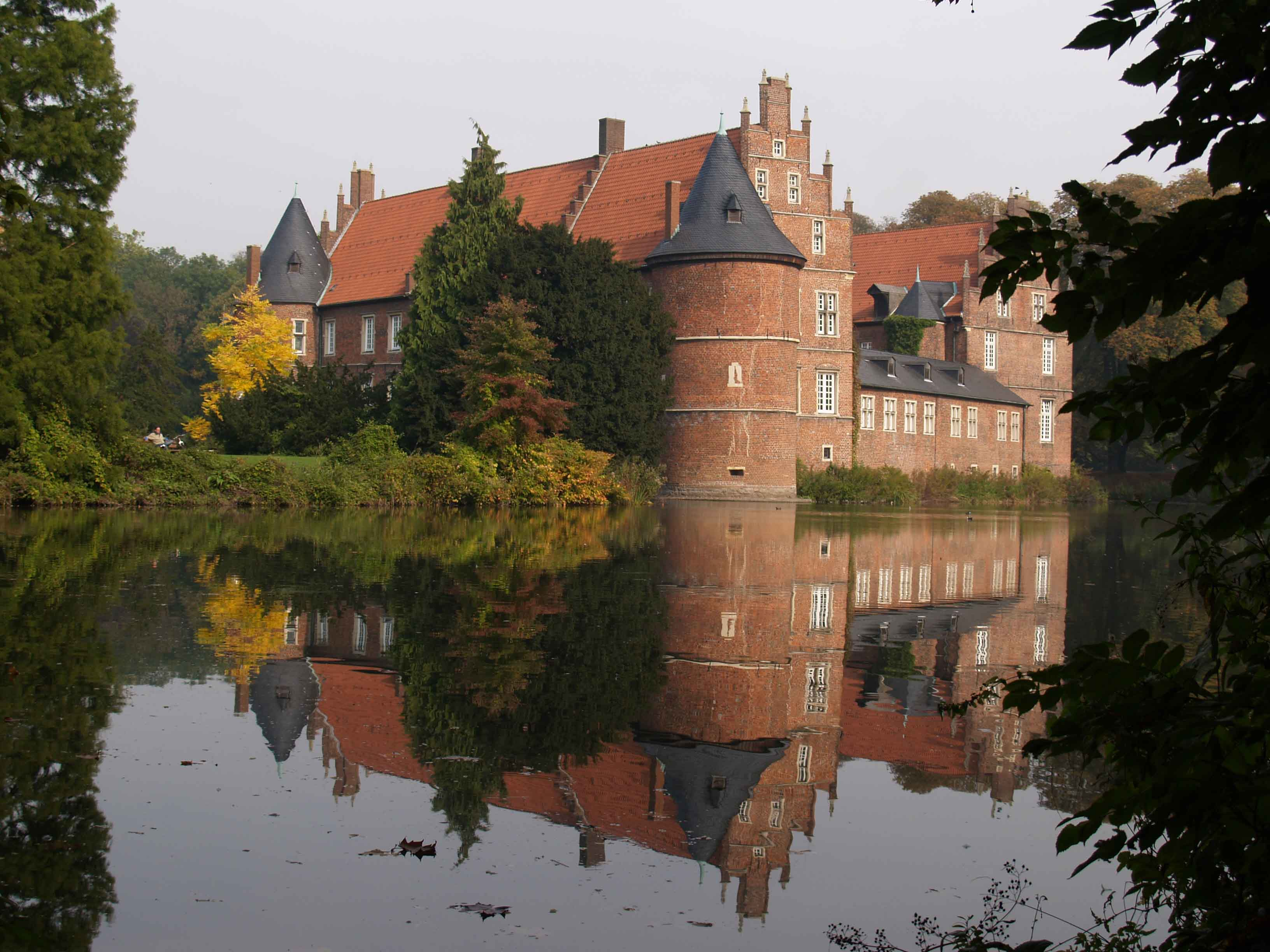
View of Herten Castle from southwest

Map of the Herten Castle including its park

Herten Castle (German: Schloss Herten) is a moated castle situated in the town of Herten in the administrative district of Recklinghausen in the state of North Rhine Westphalia, Germany. It is located within an old English landscape garden and its first mentioning dates back to 1376. In 1962, the main castle building was declared a cultural heritage monument.

While foundations of today's main castle building incorporate elements from the 14th-century building, the buildings visible today were built in the 16th and 17th century by Coesfeld architect Henric de Suer and his son Johann. They were built for the families Stecke and Nesselrode. After the First World War, the main castle building was no longer used as a residence and started to deteriorate. Subsidence caused by the widespread sub-surface mining in the surrounding industrial Ruhr area added to the structural damage, bringing the castle buildings close to collapse. Only radical restoration measures taken by the Regional Association of Westphalia-Lippe (German: Landschaftsverband Westfalen-Lippe) from 1974 to 1989 saved the late Gothic castle complex from total decline. Today it is used as a venue for concerts, cultural events and festivities. It also houses a café. The castle's park is popular for walking, picknicking, jogging and biking.

== History ==
=== Owners and residents ===
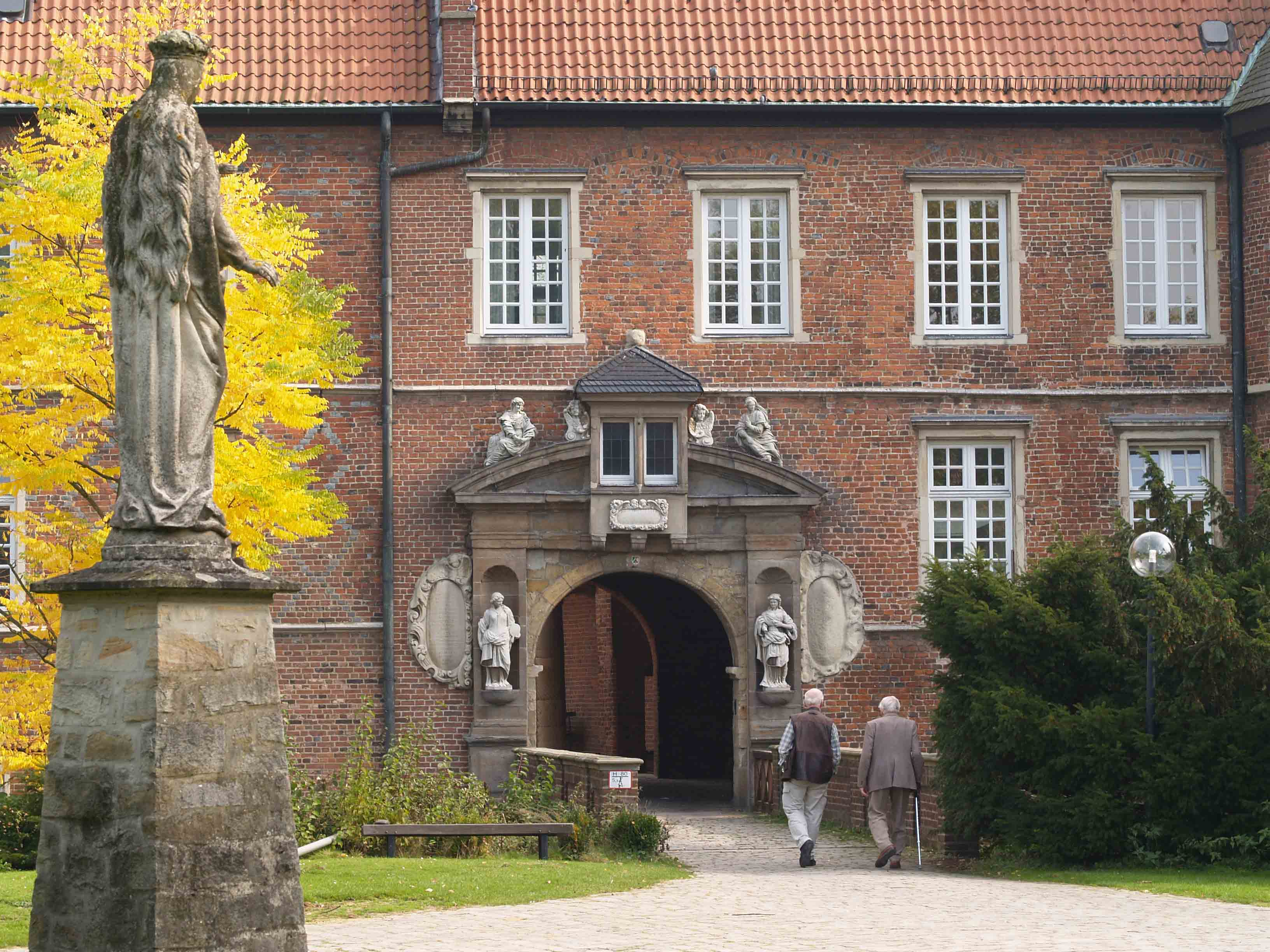
Herten Castle entrance

The Herten family, vassals of the Werden Abbey (now part of Essen), was first documented in 1286 with the mention of "Gerlach von Hertene". At that time, their residence was probably in the center of today's city next to St. Antonius church. In the 14th century, the family with "Ritter" (knight) status built a fortified house on the site of today's castle. In 1376, this building was mentioned as fief of Werden Abbey. Through marriage, the Herten house fell into the possession of the von Galen family in mid-14th century. In 1488, it changed hands in the same manner to Dietrich von Stecke zur Leythe. Ultimately, in 1529 Anna von Stecke married Betram I. von Nesselrode. As part of the powerful house of Nesselrode, he was steward for the Electorate of Cologne in the Recklinghausen district and expedited the modification and extension of the buildings in 1530.

For nearly 300 years, the castle complex remained property of the house of Nesselrode. After the last Nesselrode son and heir died in 1826, the castle fell into possession of parts of the house of Droste zu Vischering, who called themselves "Droste zu Vischering von Nesselrode-Reichenstein".

The family kept the castle as their residence until 1920, when they moved on to another castle. Due to the lack of maintenance, deserted Herten castle started to deteriorate. During the occupation of the Ruhr by French troops between 1923 and 1925, the castle was used for the housing of French troops. They left the castle devastated.

The current owner is the Regional Association of Westphalia-Lippe (German: Landschaftsverband Westfalen-Lippe) which bought the then run-down castle along with the surrounding park in 1974. The park changed hands in 2008, becoming property of the city of Herten.

=== Construction history ===
The Herten family built a medieval tower house in the first half of the 14th century, relics of which can be found in the vaulted basement of today's northern wing. The rib vault stands on foundations that are probably even older. A salvage excavation in 1974 produced more building elements from that time which couldn't be reconstructed.

Starting in 1520, the tower house was expanded and converted into a late Gothic quadrangular castle. Herten castle bears resemblance to the Schloss Nordkirchen of that time, because they were built by the same architects: Henric de Suer and his son Johann. After the completion of this project in 1560, contemporary reports describe the castle complex as an "enormous building with fortifications and ramparts". During the Cologne War, it withstood a two-year siege led by Gebhard Truchsess von Waldburg. Remains of these ramparts can still be found by the chestnut avenue to the eastern side of the castle.

Bertram von Nesselrode and his wife Lucia von Hatzfeld started remodeling the castle buildings around 1650. This included removing fortifications from the complex and adding a ceiling fresco utilizing linear perspective in the great hall of the eastern wing. The fresco was rediscovered during the 20th-century restoration works and is unique in Westphalia.

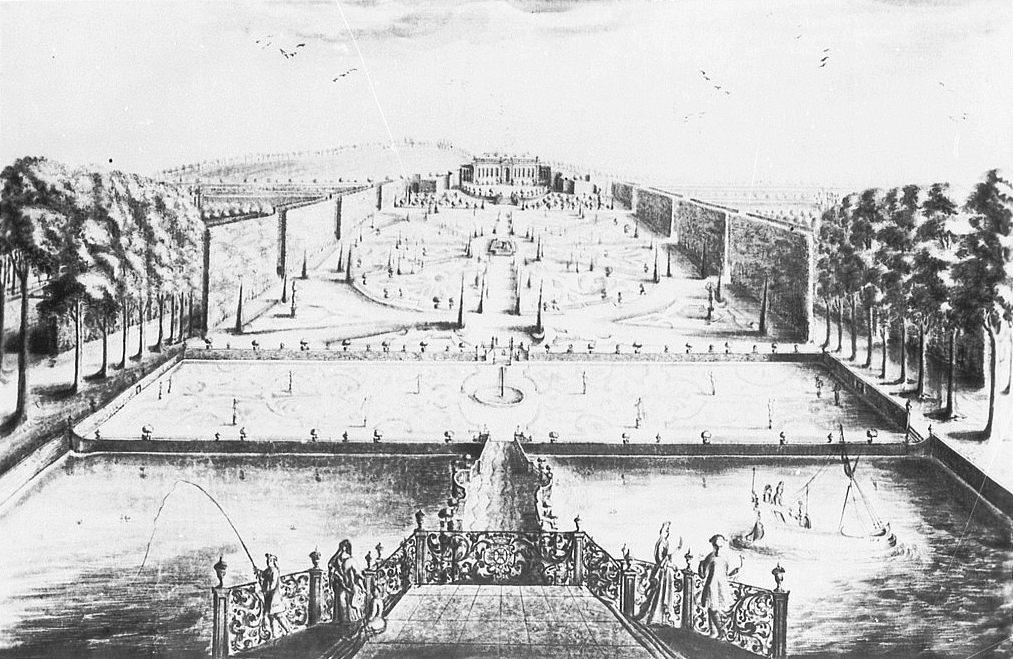
View of the park and the orangery, around 1730

Around Christmas 1687, a fire destroyed much of the northern and western wing, obliterating most of the precious library. From 1687 to 1702, the castle was reconstructed in today's form by Freiherr Franz von Nesselrode-Reichenstein. He also added the elaborate portal on the western wing of the castle and ordered the creation of a French formal garden with numerous fountains and statues. Around 1730, the Wallonian painter Renier Roidkin created quill drawings of Herten Castle's gardens. 20 of these drawings are still conserved.

About 200 meters (650 ft) north of the castle, an orangery was completed in 1725, following an English trend that became fashionable then. Following that trend, the French formal garden was converted into an English landscape garden between 1814 and 1817.

When the castle complex ceased being used in 1925, it was already in bad shape after being neglected by its owners and vandalized by French occupying troops. This and the structural damage inflicted onto the castle by coal mining subsidence left it on the verge of collapse. First safeguarding measures on the building foundations were taken in 1967. Since this did not affect the part of the buildings above ground, these parts kept deteriorating until the Regional Association of Westphalia-Lippe bought the castle complex ruins in 1974. Restoration measures were taken immediately and lasted until 1989. A considerable amount of original building fabric was beyond repair: the entire foundations as well as the ceilings were replaced by reinforced concrete structures and most of the castle was re-roofed.

== Description ==
Today's Herten Castle complex consists of two parts. The main castle is a moated red brick building with round towers at three corners and crow-stepped gables. A red brick carriage house and a chapel are on a separate island in the moat to the west of the main castle. A third island in the moat to the south of the main castle was probably used as a garden.

=== Main castle ===
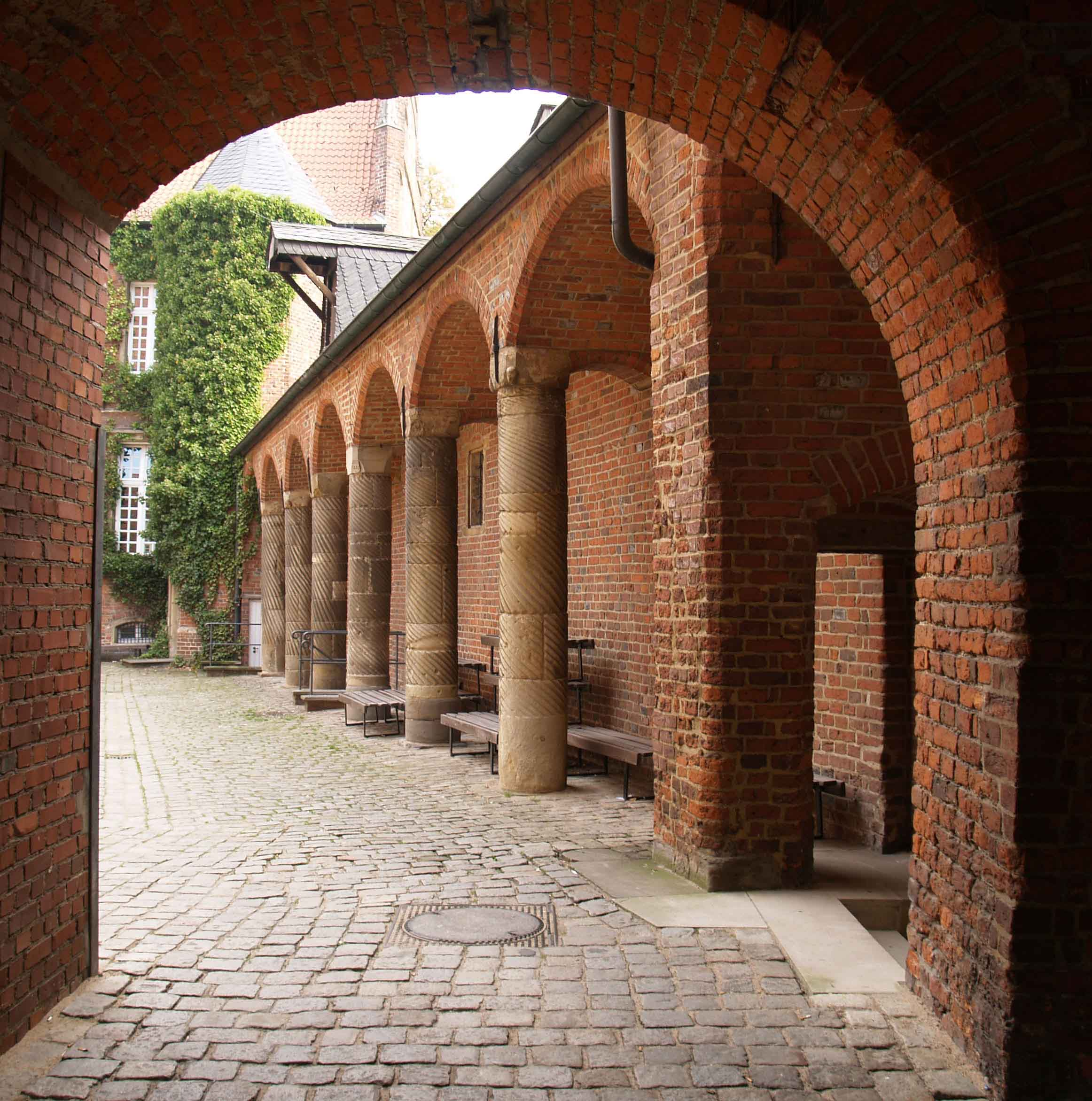
Gothic arcade columns

The main castle consists of four wings creating an inner courtyard. Except for the one-story southern wing, the wings have two stories. Both the eastern and western wings have crow-stepped gables with pinnacles. Round two-story towers with cone-shaped roofs are at three corners of the main castle. The main portal, built in today's form at the beginning of the 18th century, is in the western wing. This wing also contains the best-preserved portion of a rhombical pattern of glazed bricks within the castle's façade. The portal is framed by an aedicula. Cartouches to the left and right of the portal tell about the families who resided at Herten Castle, the fire and subsequent reconstruction, along with the motto QUAERATUR VIRTUS – INVENIETUR HONOS (Search for virtue - and honor will be found).

The northern façade of the inner courtyard is framed by two staircase towers. The southern façade consists of a late Gothic arcade, the columns of which have unusual spiral-like riffles.

Most rooms of the main castle had to be modified during the 1980s restoration. Only the two representative rooms in the eastern wing retained their original baroque features: for example, the smaller room's stucco ceiling dating back to around 1700. Especially valuable is the ceiling fresco from the mid-17th century in the main festival room.

=== Buildings on the moat's western island ===
Carriage house

The core of today's red brick carriage house probably dates back to the 16th century. It probably was only the western part of a larger building. On its northern end, the ruins of an adjacent wing can still be seen.

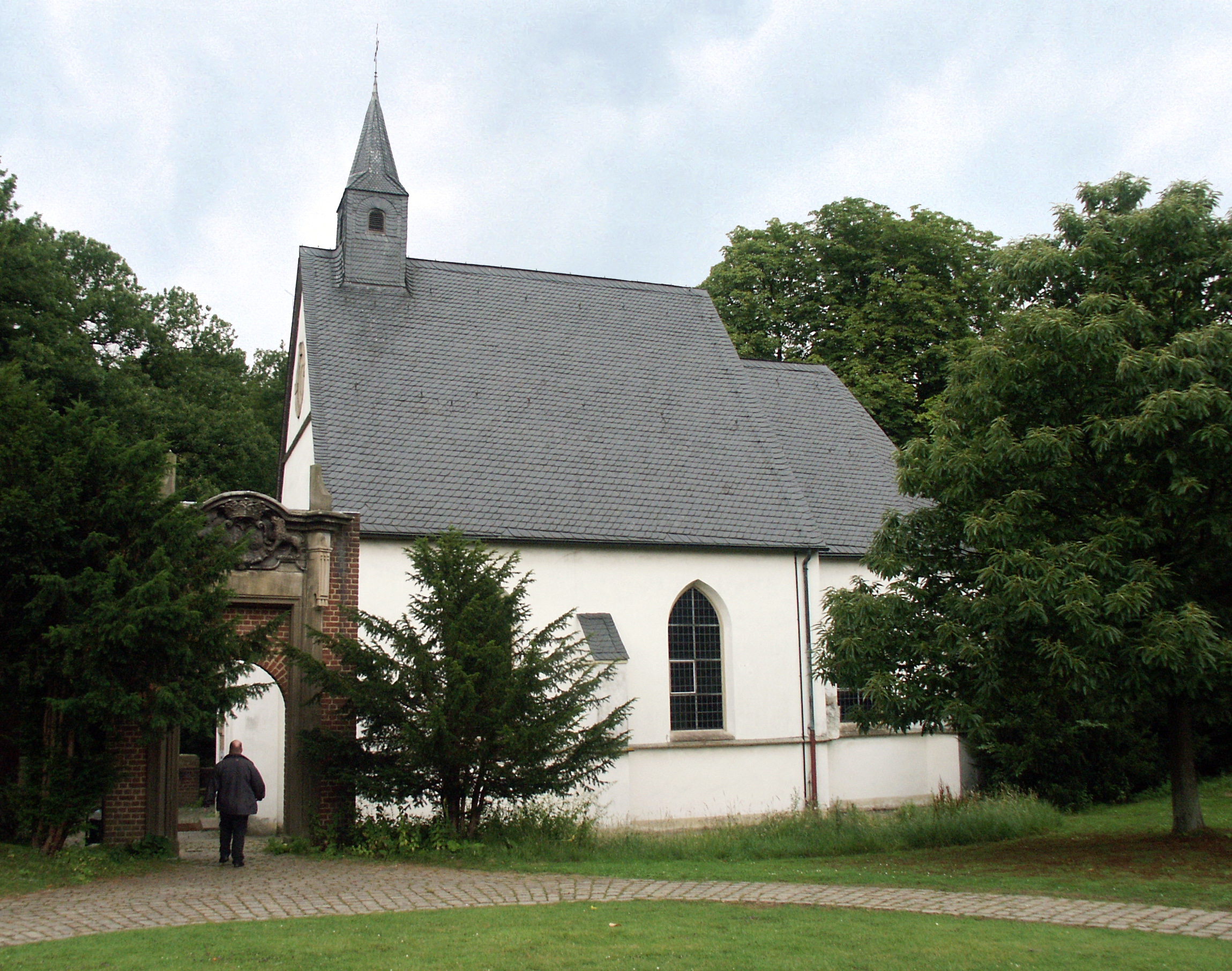
The castle chapel

Chapel

Originally, the castle's chapel was within the southern wing of the main castle building. In 1908 however, a coal mining company bought the grounds of a neighboring castle, Schloss Grimberg, as an addition to their premises. While the Grimberg castle building, now wedged between a coal mine and a canal harbor, slowly deteriorated and was torn down completely in the 1960s, the castle's Gothic chapel was immediately moved to stand next to Herten Castle's carriage house on the moat's western island.

Parts of the chapel date back to the 16th century. It consists of three aisles and the Baroque interior was installed in 1747. At the front walls of the side aisles, sandstone epitaphs of Bertram von Nesselrode, his wife Lucia von Hatzfeld, and Bertram's parents Franz von Nesselrode and Anna Maria von Wylich can be found. These epitaphs were made in 1680/81 and were originally in another Herten church.

When the chapel moved from Grimberg to Herten, the two decorated sarcophagi of Heinrich Knipping († 1578) and his wife Sybilla von Nesselrode († 1602) were also relocated. They can be found within the chapel.

=== The castle's park ===
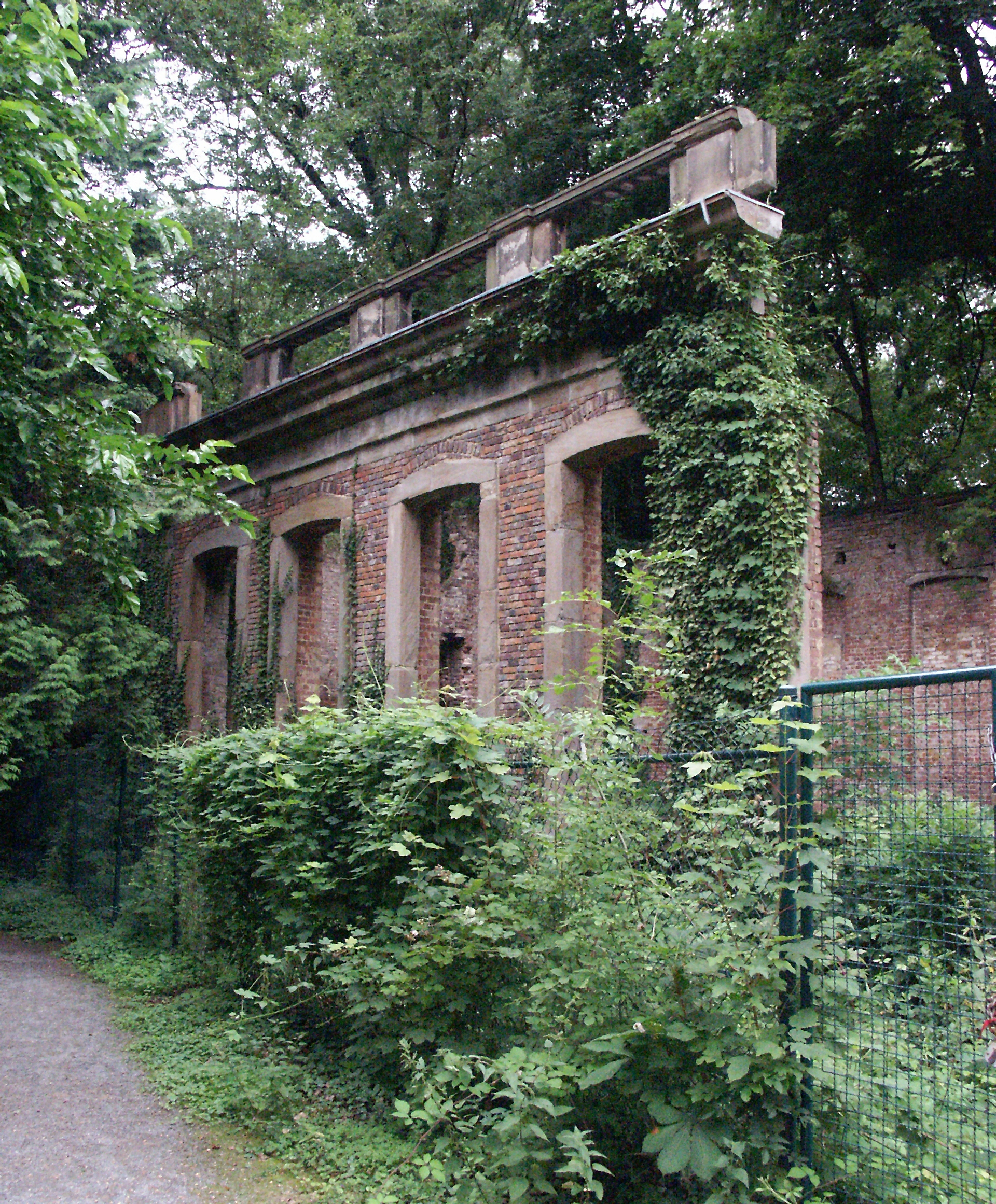
The ruins of the orangery

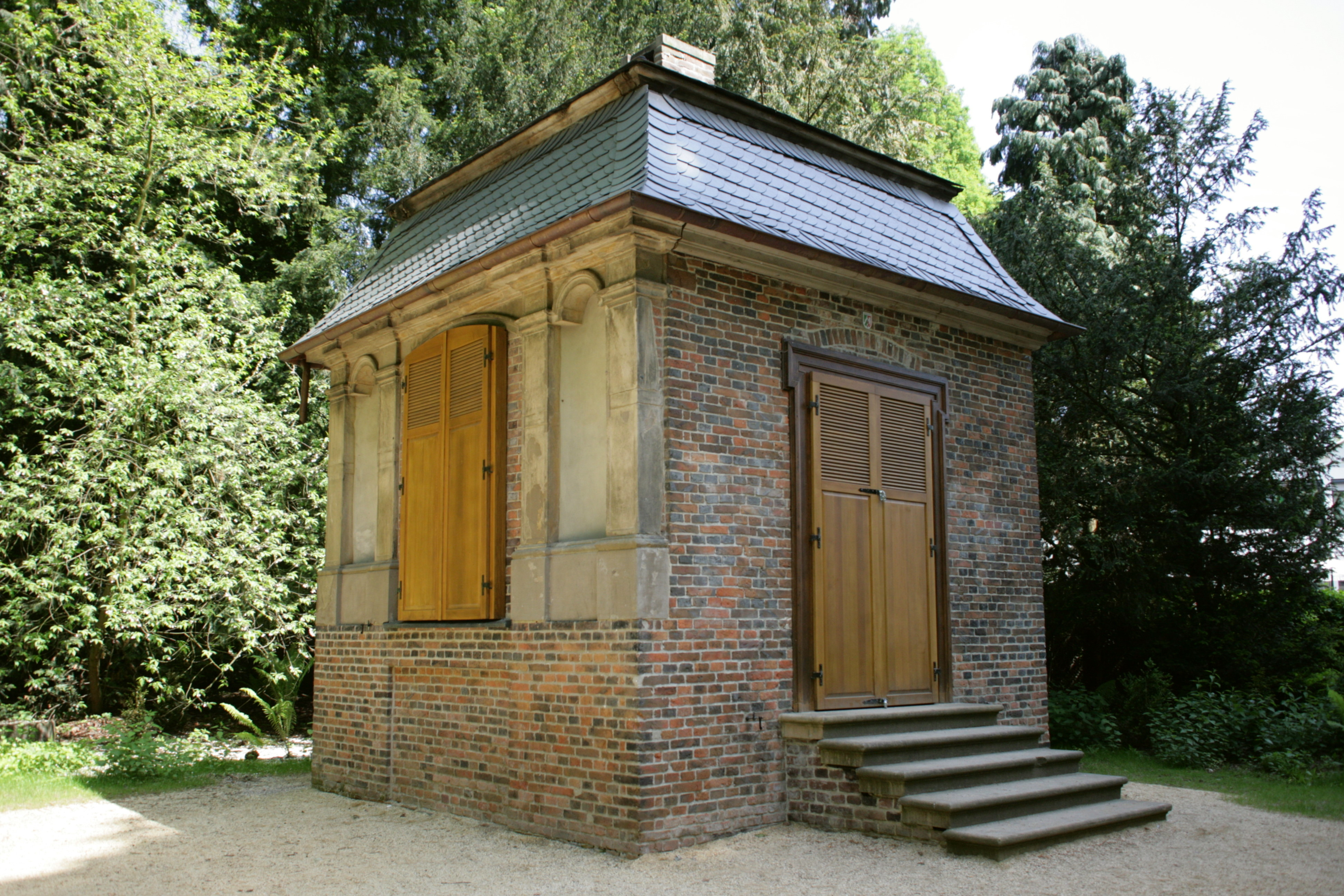
The "Tabakhaus"

Originally a French formal garden, the castle's park was modified into an English landscape garden between 1814 and 1817. While doing so, the Düsseldorf garden architect Maximilian Friedrich Weyhe kept elements of the symmetrical Baroque garden, for example some avenues and the orangery. The hedge maze no longer exists, but the open-air theater was reconstructed in a reduced form and is now used again for drama group performances.

Between the mid-19th century and the First World War, the castle's owners laid out two fish ponds and a mixed forest of approximately 200 hectares (500 acres). Furthermore, two buildings for employees at the northern entrance of the castle grounds were built during that time.

When the Regional Association of Westphalia-Lippe (German: Landschaftsverband Westfalen-Lippe) stepped in to save the castle from total collapse in 1974, the park had also been neglected for over 50 years and looked accordingly. The restoration of the park lasted until 1982, at which time the park was opened to the public. About half of its roughly 30 hectares (75 acres) are woods, five hectares are lawns and the rest are water and paths. According to castle park information, 3,067 trees from over 300 species can be found in the park, among them rare species such as a 125-year-old Chinese handkerchief tree, a Japanese bigleaf magnolia and an American lily-of-the-valley tree. These exotic plants were brought to Herten by the castle's former owners upon returning from diplomatic missions in distant countries. Due to its botanic diversity the park was awarded the status of a cultural monument in 1988.

Orangery

In 1725, a one-story Neo-Renaissance orangery was built at the northern end of the northern castle garden (today known as the "Narzissenwiese", daffodil lawn). The front of ten windows was crowned by a balustrade with twelve life-sized sandstone statues representing figures of Greek mythology. The building was not only used for wintering sensitive plants, but also as a garden social venue and dining room. While being functional, the orangery was also home to one of Germany's most famous collections of Japanese camellia. Today, the building is only a ruin.

Tobacco House

A square garden pavilion in the eastern part of the park is called "Tabakhaus" (tobacco house) and commemorates two counts of Riaucourt who were sons of a countess of Nesselrode and fled to Herten when the French Revolution swept through their home country. While living in Herten, the two counts smoked tobacco in the "Tabakhaus" since it was regarded as a new-fashioned sin and not permitted in the main castle. The "Tabakhaus" is a small Louis Seize-style brick building with a mansard roof. Private fundraising made the restoration possible.

== Today's Use ==
The main castle today is a venue for numerous cultural events, for example the international Klavierfestival Ruhr and the Herten castle concerts. Every year at whitsun, the castle's park hosts a two-day arts and crafts market including several performances.

The castle houses a café with two rooms in the northern wing. During summer there is seating also on the wooden bridge across the moat. It is possible to have civil weddings in the castle.

The vaulted castle basement contains an exhibition by the German "Nature and Biodiversity Conservation Union" NGO showcasing the flora and fauna of the park.

The carriage house is used as a social center and day hospital of the adjacent psychiatry and psychotherapy clinic run by the Regional Association of Westphalia-Lippe.

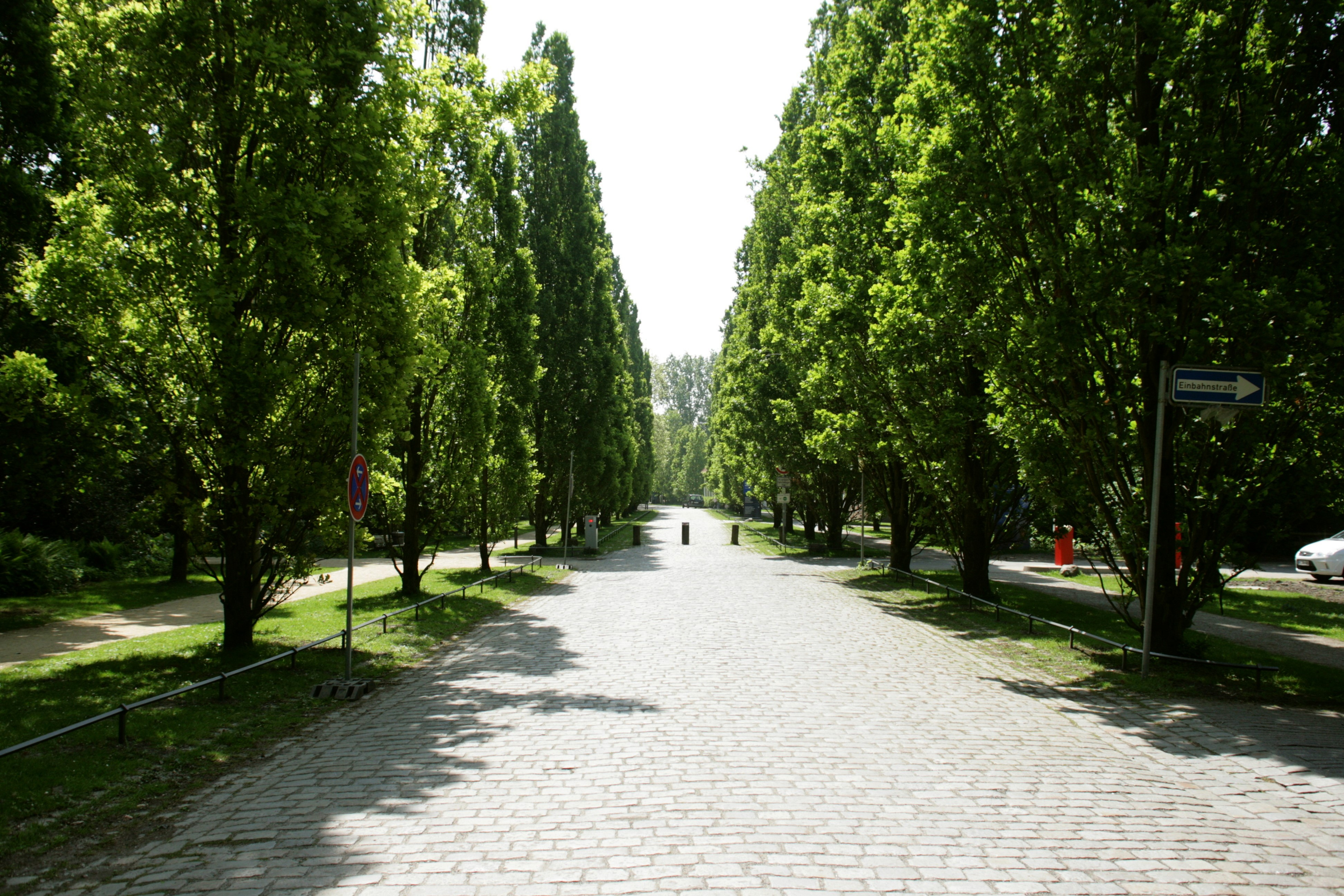
Entrance avenue to the park, looking out

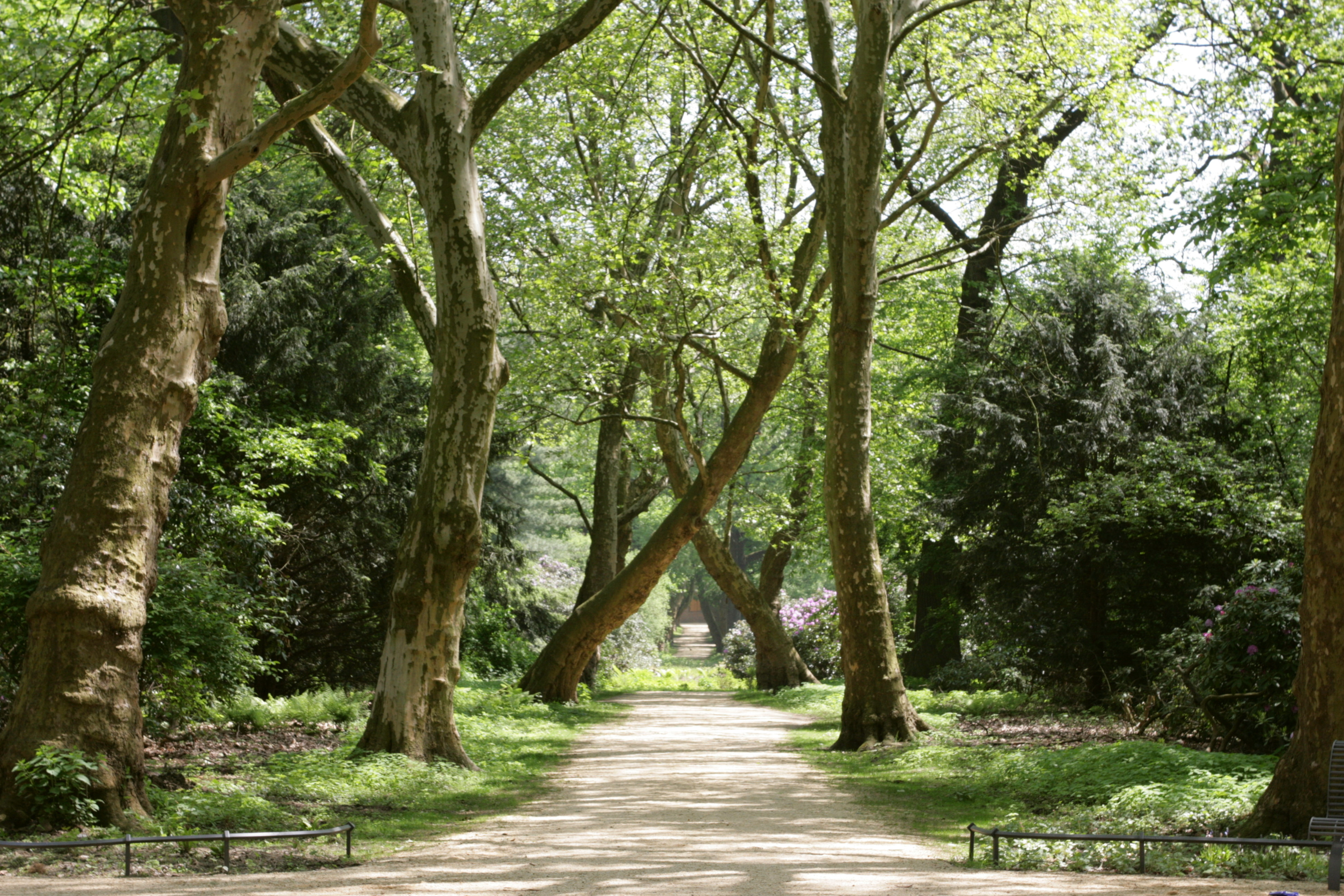
London plane avenue in the park

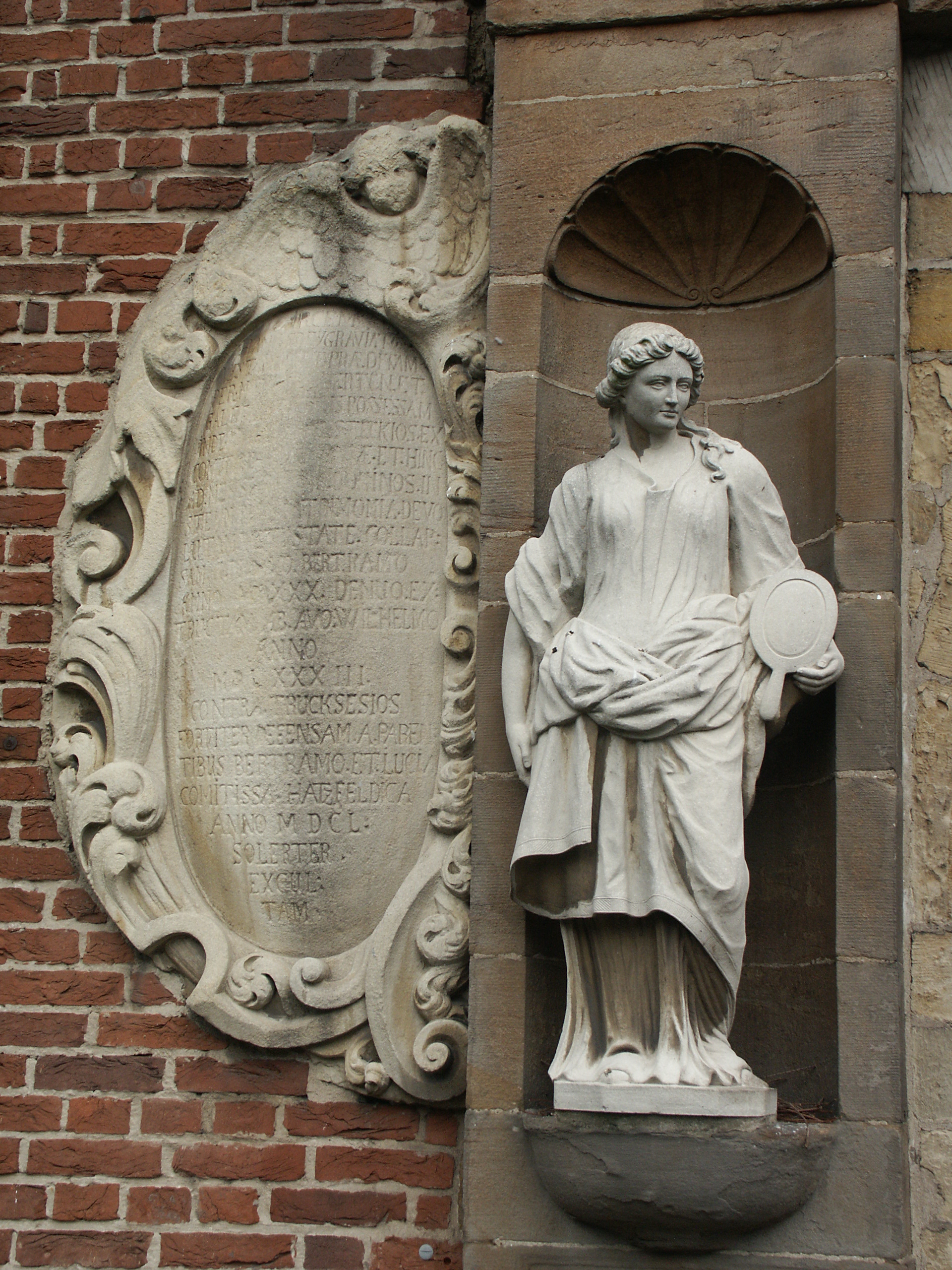
Detail of the entrance portal with cartouche

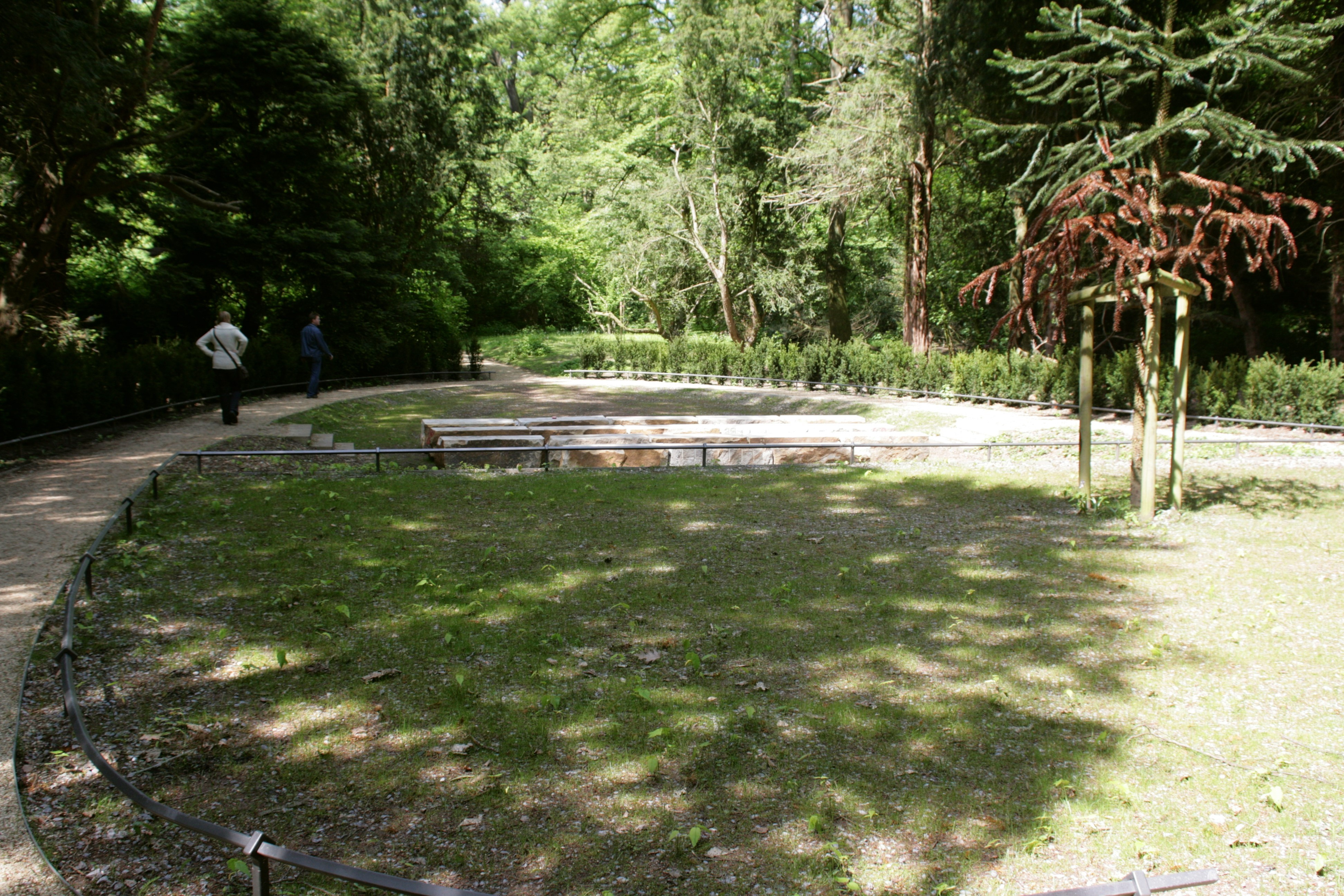
The reconstructed open-air theater

== Further reading (in German) ==
- Alexander Duncker: Die ländlichen Wohnsitze, Schlösser und Residenzen der ritterschaftlichen Grundbesitzer in der preußischen Monarchie nebst den königlichen Familien-, Haus-, Fideicommiss- und Schattull-Gütern. Band 3. Berlin 1860 (PDF; 267 KB, German).
- Stefan Kleineschulte: Schloss Herten. In: Kai Niederhöfer (Red.): Burgen AufRuhr. Unterwegs zu 100 Burgen, Schlössern und Herrensitzen in der Ruhrregion. Klartext Verlag, Essen 2010, ISBN 978-3-8375-0234-3, S. 339–342.
- August Kracht: Burgen und Schlösser im Sauerland, Siegerland, Hellweg, Industriegebiet. Ein Handbuch. Umschau Verlag, Frankfurt am Main 1976, ISBN 3-8035-8011-0, Seite 293–301.
- Ursula Schumacher-Haardt: Schloss Herten. Westfälischer Heimatbund, Münster 1993, ISSN 0930-3952 (Westfälische Kunststätten. Heft Nr. 68).
- Gregor Spohr, Friedrich Duhme, Wolfgang Quickels: Schloßpark Herten. Ein kleines Stück vom Paradies. Droste, Herten 1997, ISBN 3-89355-909-4.
