= Hagen Open-air Museum =

Open-air museum in Hagen, North Rhine-Westphalia, Germany

Coordinates: 51°20′05″N 7°28′38″E

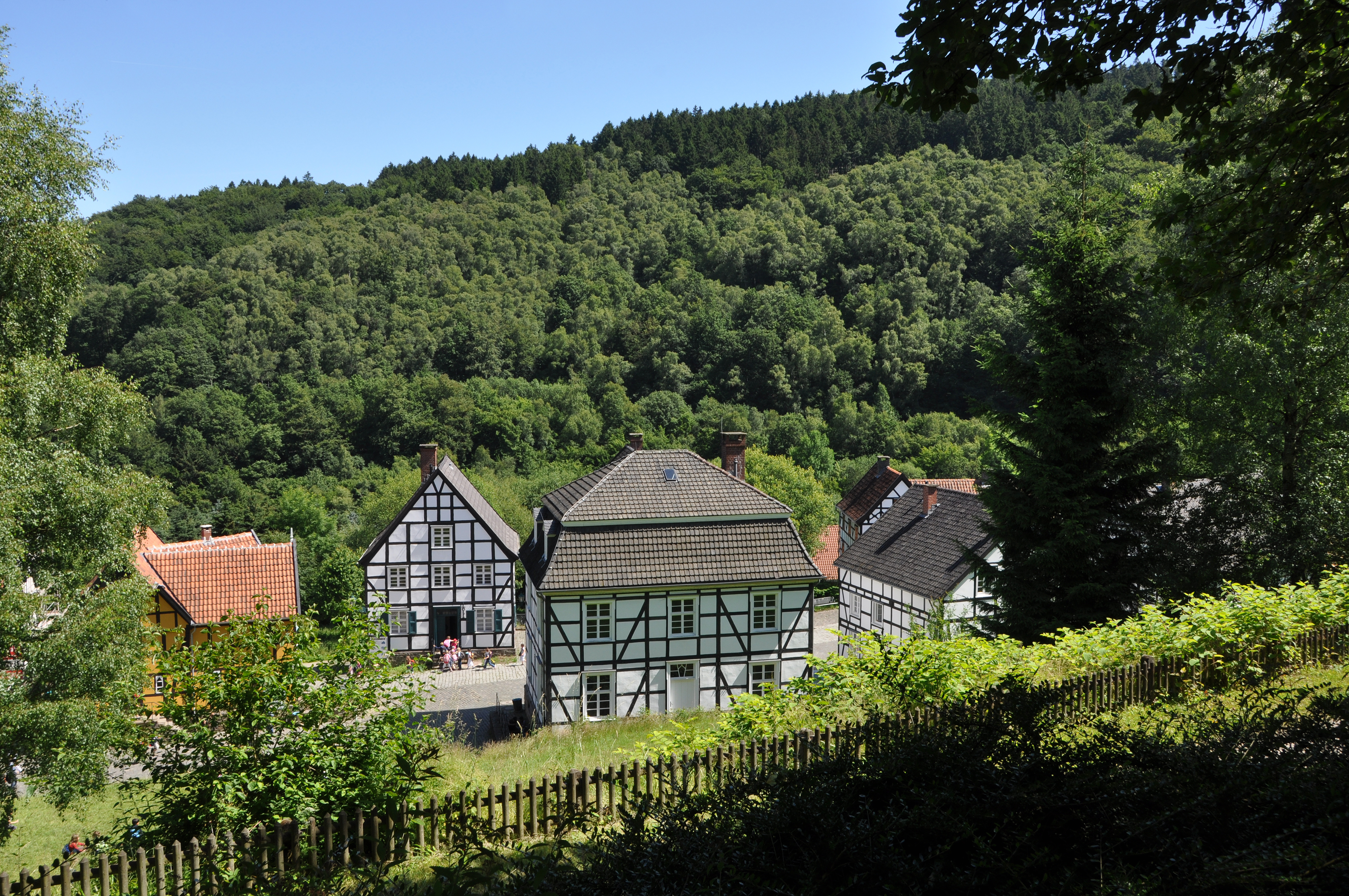
Part of the open-air museum in the Mäckingerbach valley

Hagen Open-air Museum, North Rhine-Westphalia

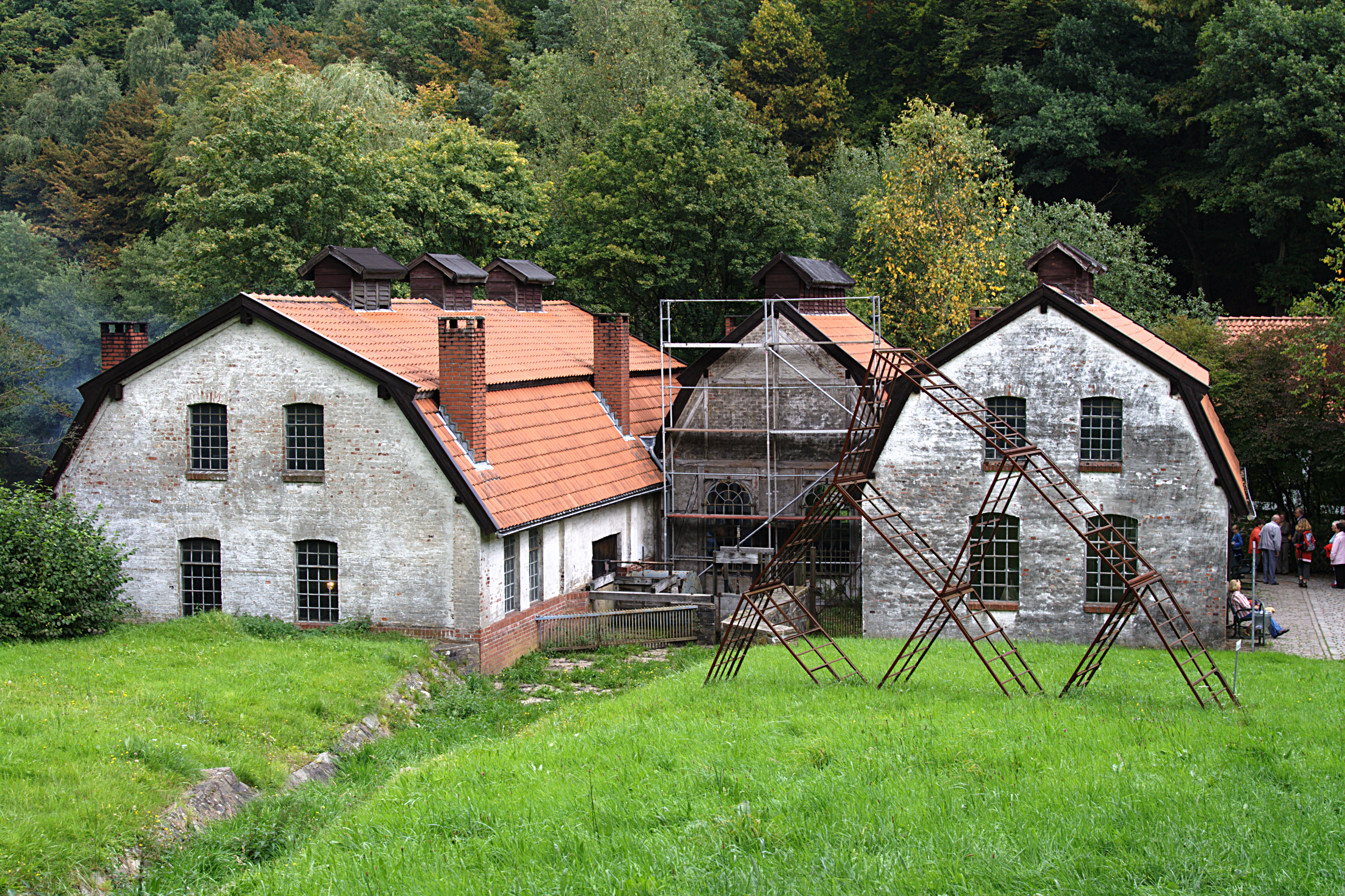
The building housing a trip hammer used to craft scythes at the museum (the framework object in the foreground is a sculpture)

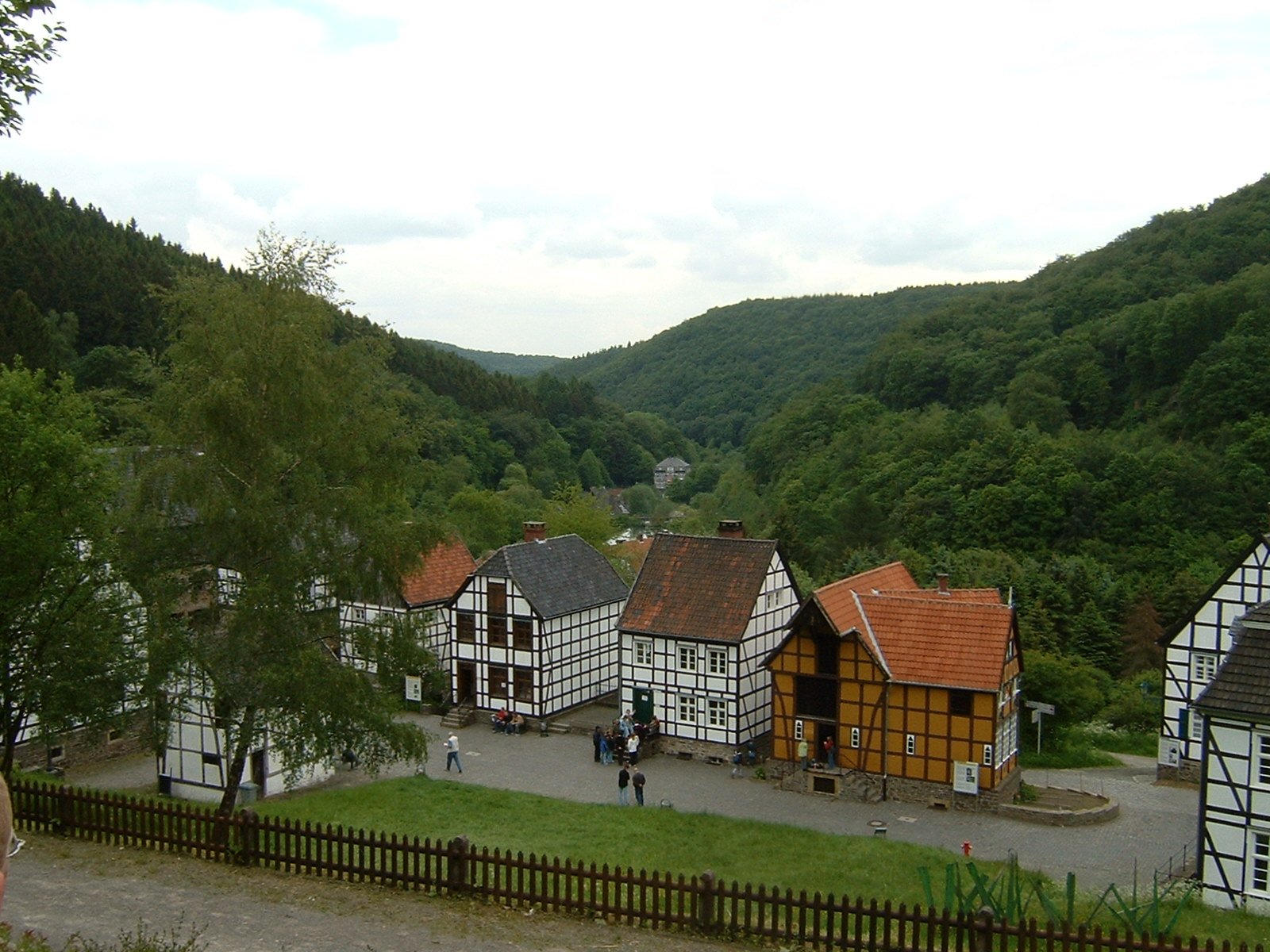
The Mäckingerbach valley seen from the upper part of the museum

The Hagen Westphalian Open-Air Museum (German: LWL-Freilichtmuseum Hagen – Westfälisches Landesmuseum für Handwerk und Technik; English: "LWL Open-air Museum Hagen – Westphalian State Museum for Craft and Technics") is a museum at Hagen in the southeastern Ruhr area, North Rhine-Westphalia, Germany.

== Overview ==
The museum was founded, together with the Detmold Open-air Museum, in 1960, and was first opened to the public in the early 1970s. The museum is run by the Landschaftsverband Westfalen-Lippe (LWL, regional authority for Westphalia and Lippe within North Rhine-Westphalia). It lies in the Hagen neighbourhood of Selbecke south of Eilpe in the Mäckingerbach valley.

The open-air museum brings a bit of skilled-trade history into the present, and it takes a hands-on approach. On its grounds stretching for about 42 ha, not only are urban and rural trades simply "displayed" along with their workshops and tools, but in more than twenty of the nearly sixty rebuilt workshops, they are still practised, and interested visitors can, sometimes by themselves, take part in the production.

== History ==
As early as the 1920s, there were efforts by a group of engineers and historical preservationists to preserve technological monuments for posterity. The initiator, Wilhelm Claas, even suggested the Mäckingerbach valley as a good place for a museum to that end. The narrow valley was chosen, as wind, water and wood were the three most important location factors for industry in the 18th and 19th centuries.

In 1960, the Westphalian Open-Air Museum was founded, and thirteen years later, the gates opened to the public. Unlike most open-air museums, which show everyday life on the farm or in the country as it was in days gone by, the Hagen Open-Air Museum puts the history of these activities in Westphalia in the fore. From the late 18th century through the early years of the Industrial Revolution to the highly industrialized society emerging in the early 20th century, the visitor can experience the development of these trades and the industry in the region.

== Crafts and trades ==
Crafts and trades demonstrated at the Westphalian Open-Air Museum include ropemaking, smithing, brewing, baking, tanning, printing, milling, papermaking, etc. An important attraction is the triphammer workshop. Once the hammer is engaged, a craftsman goes to work noisily forging a scythe, passing it between the hammer and the anvil underneath in a process called peening.

The Hagen Westphalian Open-Air Museum is open from March or April until October.

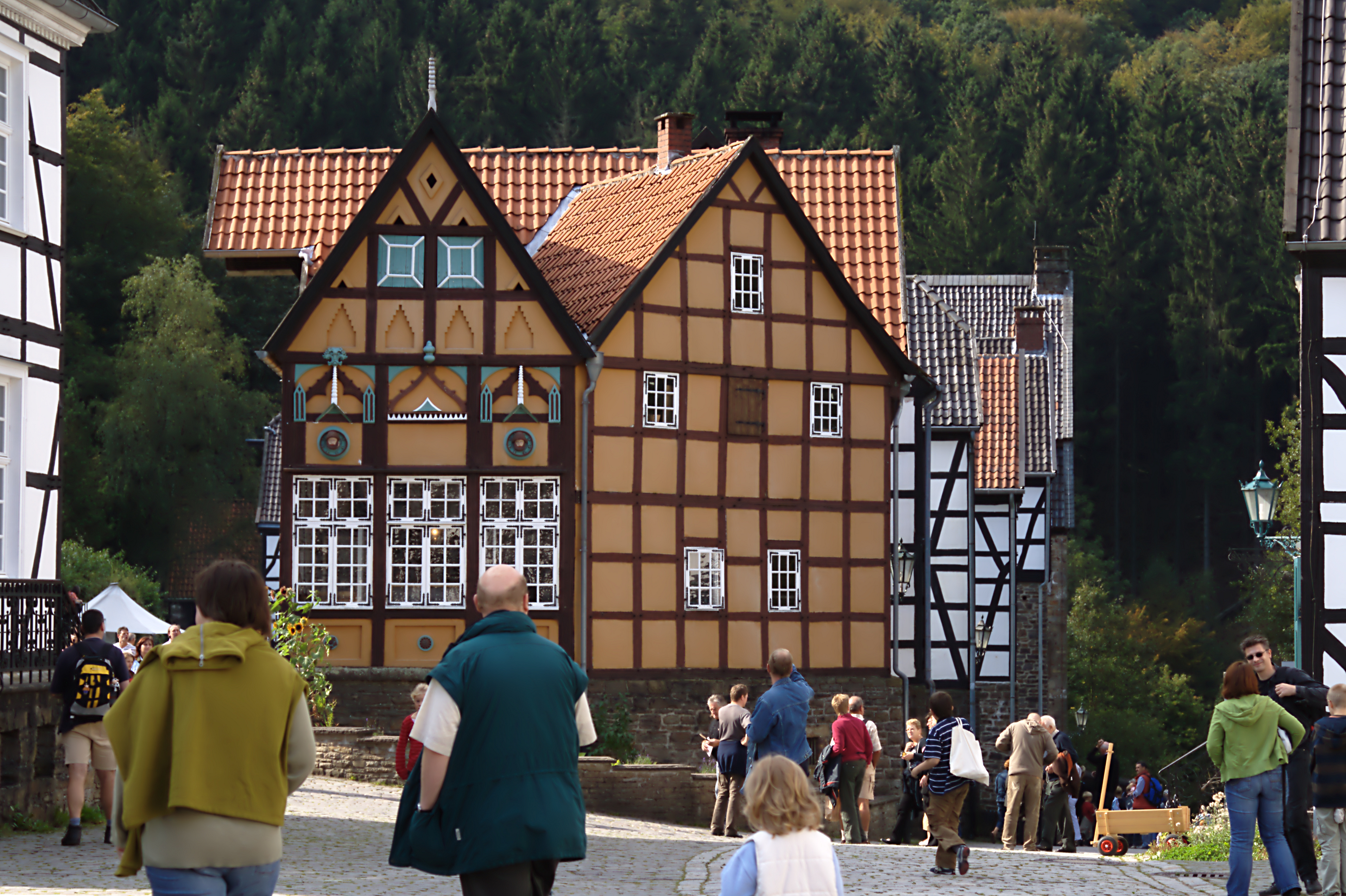
Visitors in front of the old tobacco manufactory

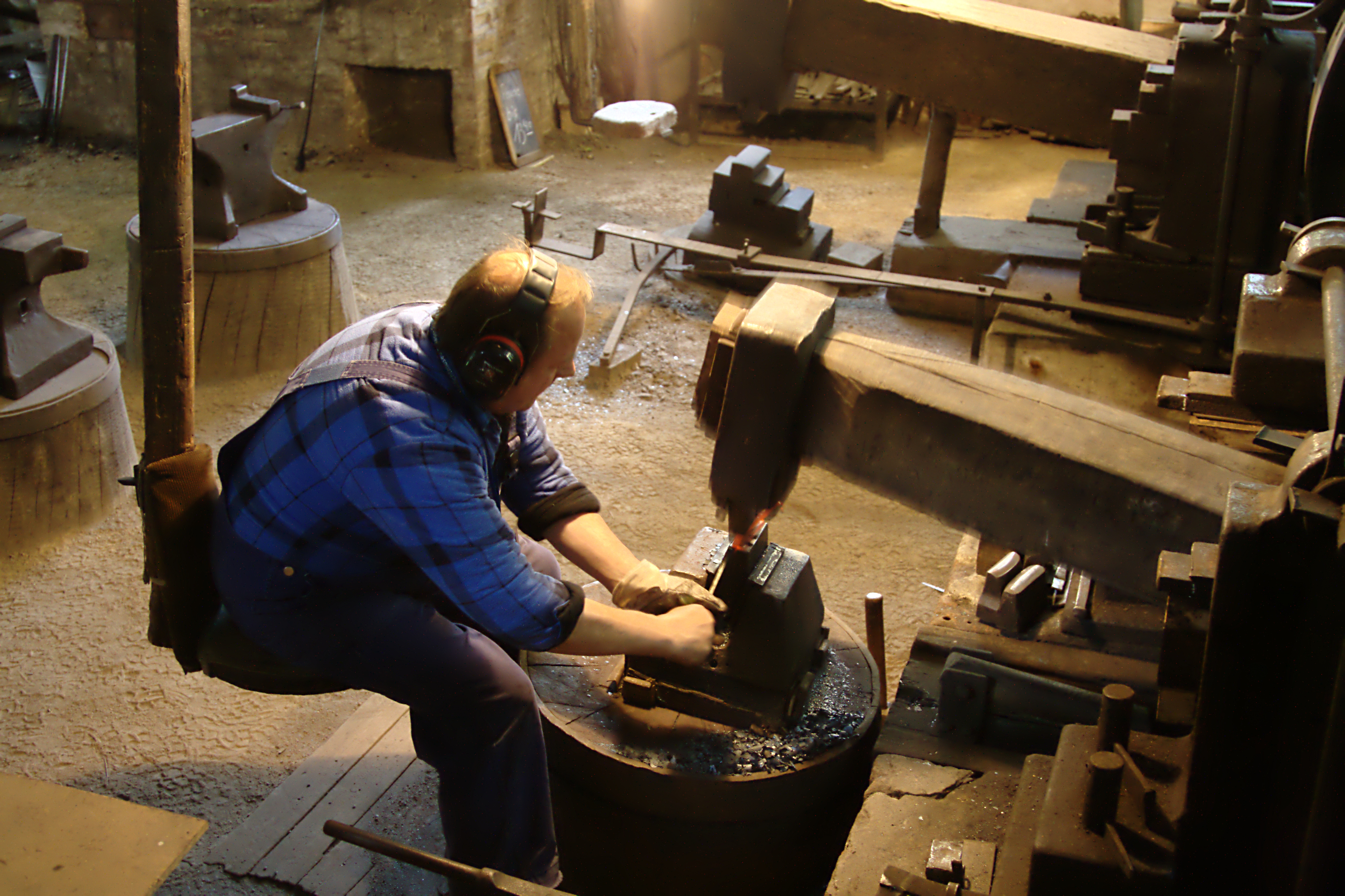
Craftsman at a trip hammer

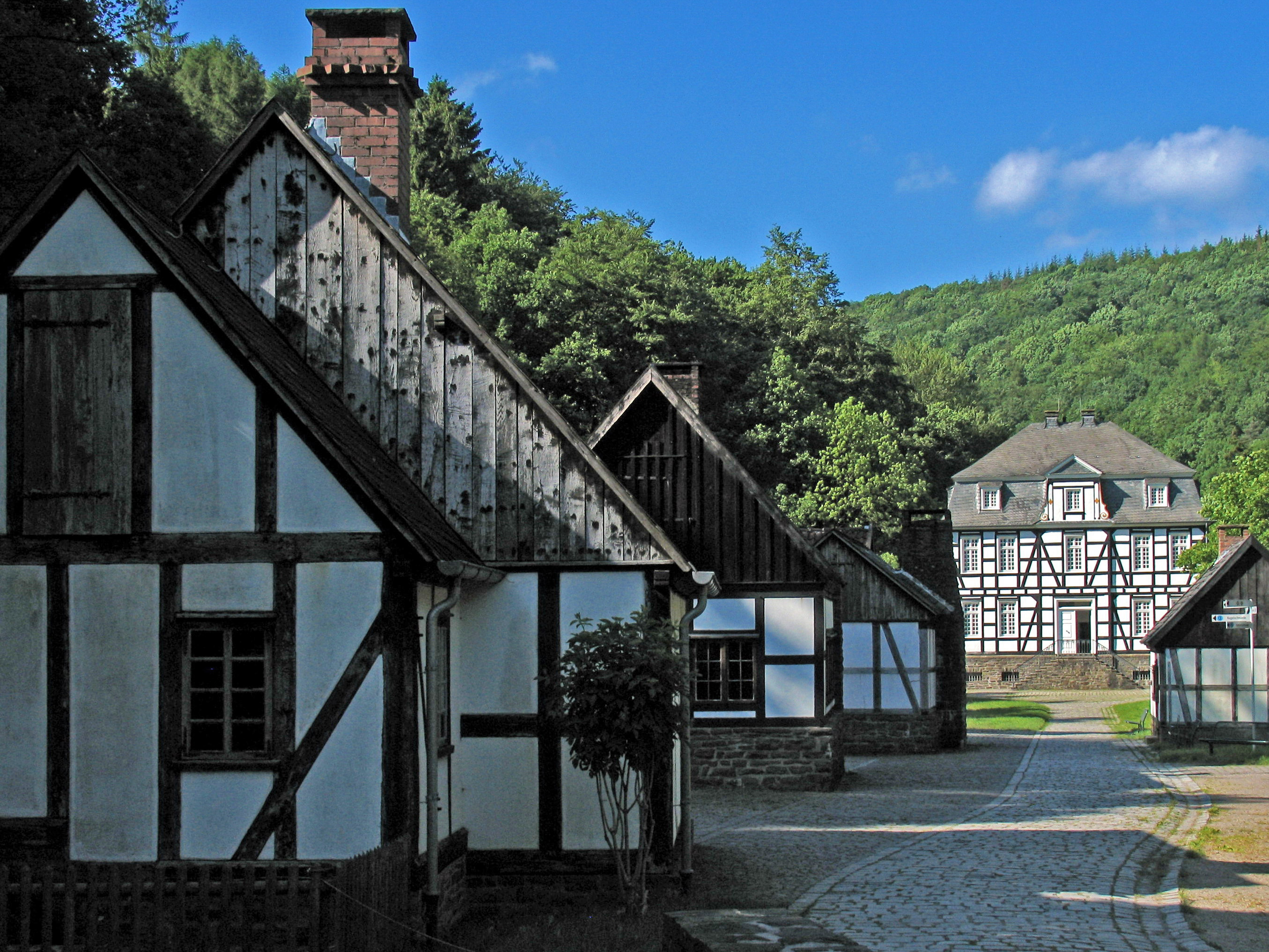
Timber-framed buildings, including the relocated Amtshaus of Neunkirchen

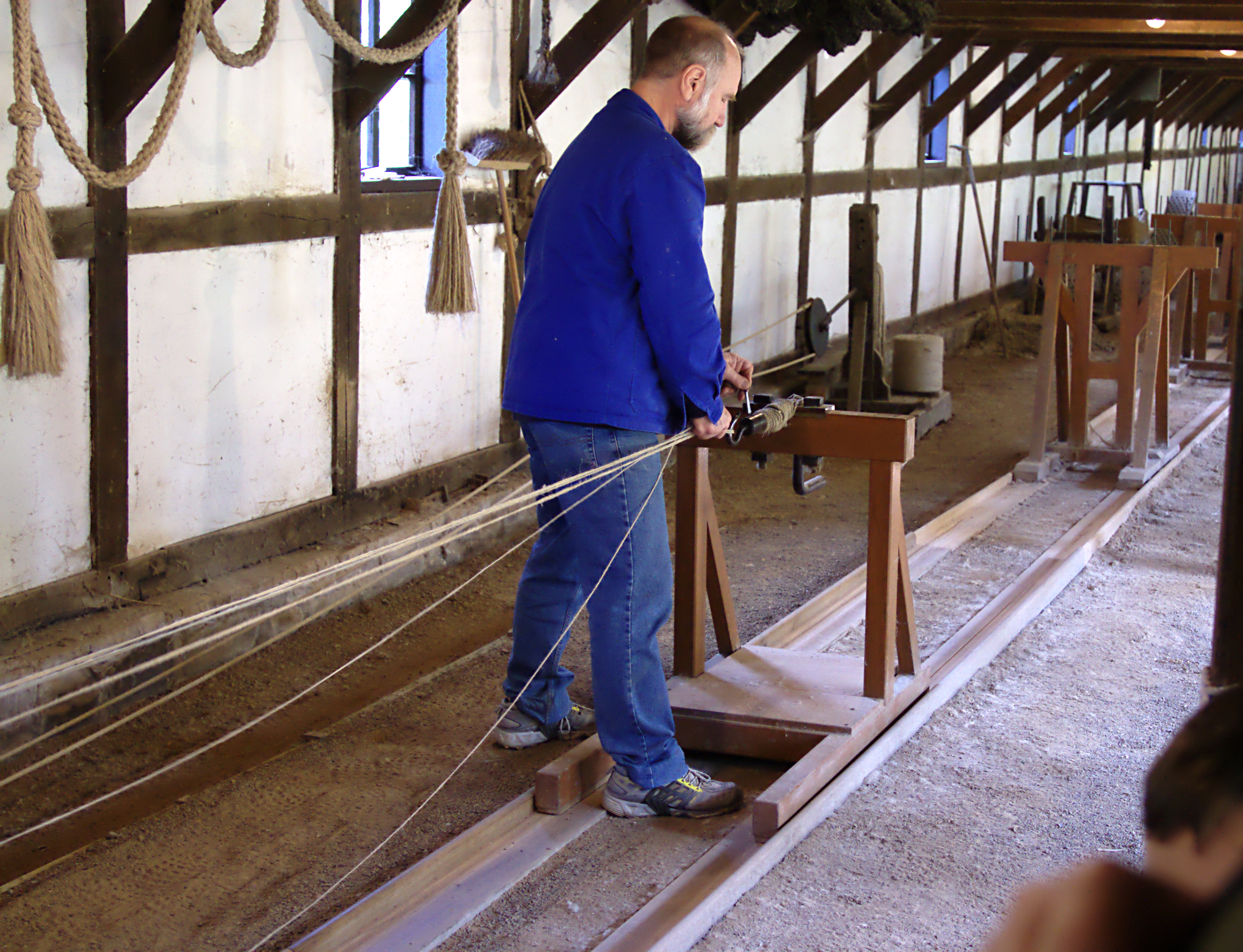
Ropemaking at the ropewalk

== See also ==
- Historisches Centrum Hagen
