= Detmold Open-air Museum =

Museum in North Rhine-Westphalia, Germany

Coordinates: 51°55′25″N 8°52′12″E

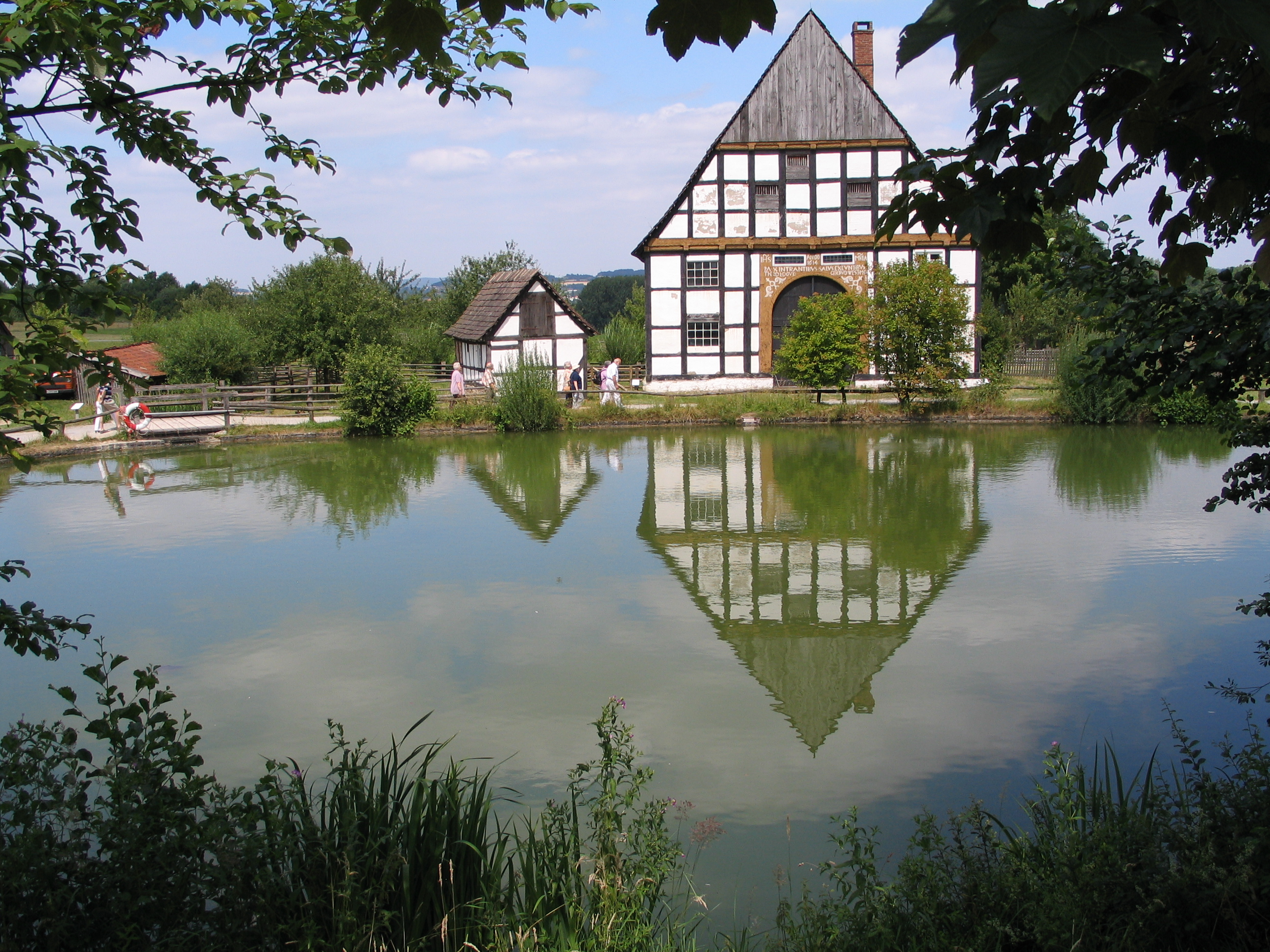
Lake and timber-framed buildings in the museum

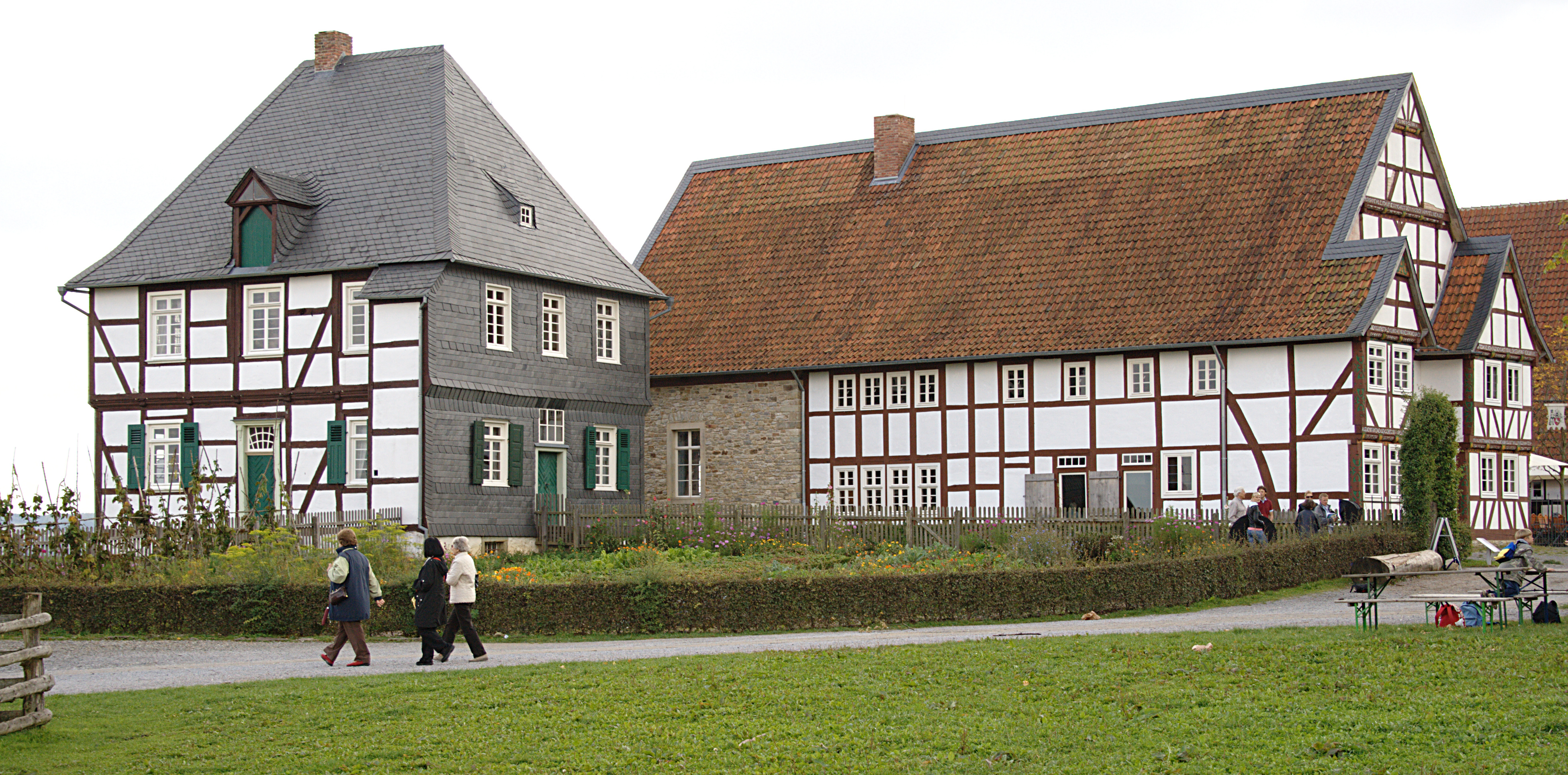
"Paderborn village" in the museum, rectory and restaurant "Im Weißen Ross"

The Detmold Open-air Museum (German: LWL-Freilichtmuseum Detmold – Westfälisches Landesmuseum für Volkskunde; English: "LWL Open-air Museum Detmold – Westphalian State Museum for Folkloristics") is a museum at Detmold in the Ostwestfalen-Lippe region of North Rhine-Westphalia, Germany. It was founded, together with the Hagen Open-air Museum, in 1960, and was first opened to the public in the early 1970s. The museum is run by the Landschaftsverband Westfalen-Lippe (LWL, regional authority for Westphalia and Lippe within North Rhine-Westphalia).

== Exhibitions ==
Over 120 historic, rural buildings were transported and reconstructed from across the state, including schools, farmhouses, thatched cottages, and windmills. Over 90 acres (0.36 km^{2}) of bucolic fields and ponds are available for horse-drawn carriage rides, walking tours, and picnicking. The museum also hosts special exhibitions and interactive craft demonstrations, such as blacksmithing and pottery-making. It is open seasonally, between 1 April and 31 October.
