= Westphalian State Museum of Art and Cultural History =

Museum of art and culture in Germany

Coordinates: 51°57′43″N 07°37′28″E

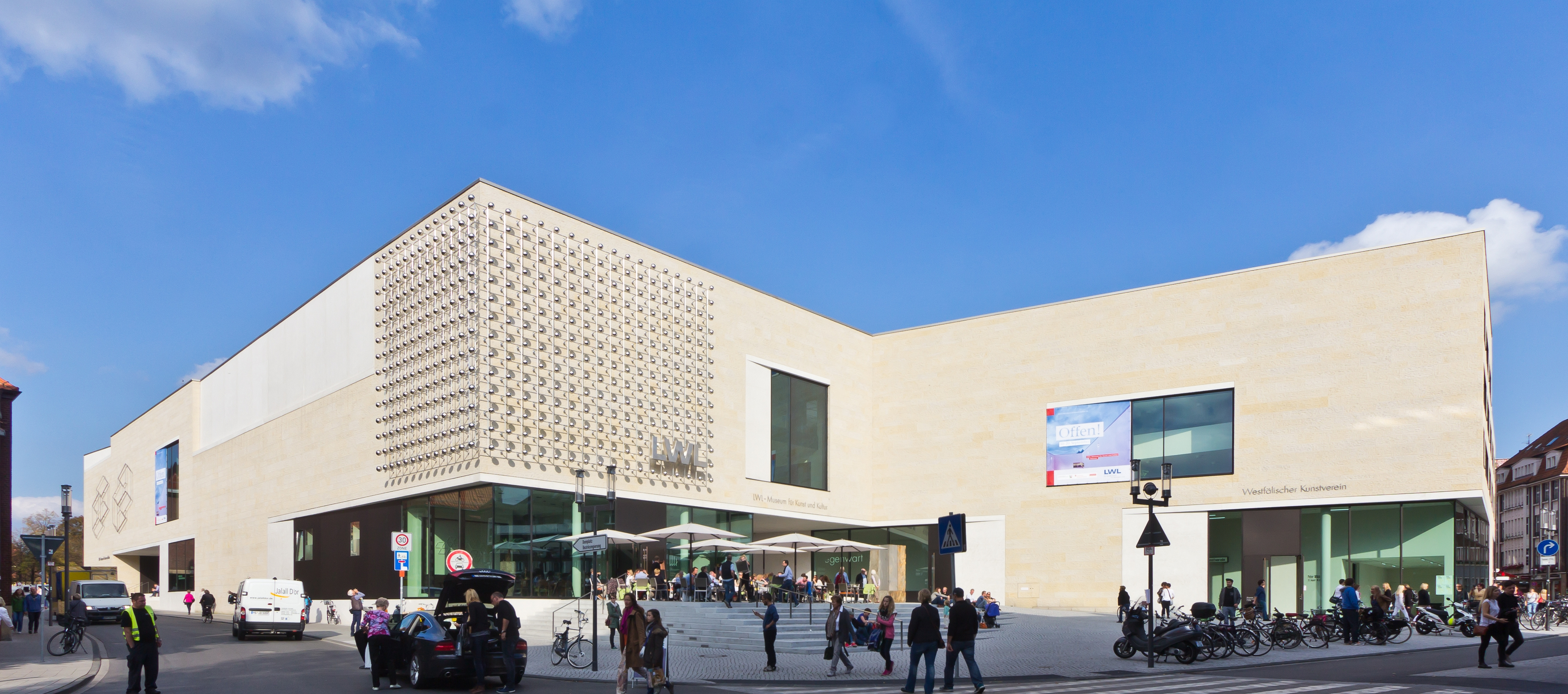
The LWL in 2014

Westphalian State Museum of Art and Cultural History, Münster

The Westphalian State Museum of Art and Cultural History (German: LWL-Landesmuseum für Kunst und Kulturgeschichte) is an arts and cultural museum in Münster, Germany.

== Collections and Specializations ==
The museum's collection includes:

- Late Gothic ("Spätgotik") paintings and sculptures
- Works by the Cranach family
- Paintings from the Der Blaue Reiter and Die Brücke movements, with a particular focus on artists like August Macke

== History and development ==
The museum's origins date back to the 19th century, with significant contributions from local art associations. The Westphalian Art Association, established in 1831, played a crucial role in collecting and preserving regional art. The museum has undergone several transformations, including the construction of a new building that opened in September 2014.
