= Bottrop – Recklinghausen III =

Federal electoral district of Germany

124 Bottrop – Recklinghausen III
- Electoral district for the Bundestag
- Bottrop – Recklinghausen III in 2025
- State: North Rhine-Westphalia
- Population: 267,900 (2019)
- Electorate: 199,344 (2021)
- Major settlements: Bottrop; Gladbeck; Dorsten
- Area: 307.8 km^{2}

Current electoral district
- Created: 1949
- Party: CDU
- Member: Nicklas Kappe
- Elected: 2025

Bottrop – Recklinghausen III is an electoral constituency (German: Wahlkreis) represented in the Bundestag. It elects one member via first-past-the-post voting. Under the current constituency numbering system, it is designated as constituency 124. It is located in the Ruhr region of North Rhine-Westphalia, comprising the city of Bottrop and western parts of the Recklinghausen district.

Bottrop – Recklinghausen III was created for the inaugural 1949 federal election. From 2009 to 2025, it has been represented by Michael Gerdes of the Social Democratic Party (SPD). Since 2025 it has been represented by Nicklas Kappe of the CDU.

== Geography ==
Bottrop – Recklinghausen III is located in the Ruhr region of North Rhine-Westphalia. As of the 2021 federal election, it comprises the independent city of Bottrop as well as the municipalities of Dorsten and Gladbeck from the Recklinghausen district.

== History ==
Bottrop – Recklinghausen III was created in 1949, then known as Gladbeck – Bottrop. From 1965 through 1976, it was named Bottrop – Gladbeck. From 1980 through 1998, it was named Bottrop – Recklinghausen IV. It acquired its current name in the 2002 election. In the 1949 election, it was North Rhine-Westphalia constituency 43 in the numbering system. From 1953 through 1961, it was number 102. From 1965 through 1976, it was number 101. From 1980 through 1998, it was number 95. From 2002 through 2009, it was number 126. In the 2013 through 2021 elections, it was number 125. From the 2025 election, it has been number 124.

Originally, the constituency comprised the independent cities of Bottrop and Gladbeck. Gladbeck was incorporated into the Recklinghausen district in 1976, but the constituency's borders did not change. In the 2002 election, it acquired the municipality of Dorsten from Recklinghausen district.

Election	No.	Name	Borders
1949	43	Gladbeck – Bottrop	Bottrop city; Gladbeck city
1953	102	Gladbeck – Bottrop	Bottrop city; Gladbeck city
1957	102	Gladbeck – Bottrop	Bottrop city; Gladbeck city
1961	102	Gladbeck – Bottrop	Bottrop city; Gladbeck city
1965	101	Bottrop – Gladbeck	Bottrop city; Gladbeck city
1969	101	Bottrop – Gladbeck	Bottrop city; Gladbeck city
1972	101	Bottrop – Gladbeck	Bottrop city; Gladbeck city
1976	101	Bottrop – Gladbeck	Bottrop city; Recklinghausen district (only Gladbeck municipality)
1980	95	Bottrop – Recklinghausen IV	Bottrop city; Recklinghausen district (only Gladbeck municipality)
1983	95	Bottrop – Recklinghausen IV	Bottrop city; Recklinghausen district (only Gladbeck municipality)
1987	95	Bottrop – Recklinghausen IV	Bottrop city; Recklinghausen district (only Gladbeck municipality)
1990	95	Bottrop – Recklinghausen IV	Bottrop city; Recklinghausen district (only Gladbeck municipality)
1994	95	Bottrop – Recklinghausen IV	Bottrop city; Recklinghausen district (only Gladbeck municipality)
1998	95	Bottrop – Recklinghausen IV	Bottrop city; Recklinghausen district (only Gladbeck municipality)
2002	126	Bottrop – Recklinghausen III	Bottrop city; Recklinghausen district (only Dorsten and Gladbeck municipalities)
2005	126	Bottrop – Recklinghausen III	Bottrop city; Recklinghausen district (only Dorsten and Gladbeck municipalities)
2009	126	Bottrop – Recklinghausen III	Bottrop city; Recklinghausen district (only Dorsten and Gladbeck municipalities)
2013	125	Bottrop – Recklinghausen III	Bottrop city; Recklinghausen district (only Dorsten and Gladbeck municipalities)
2017	125	Bottrop – Recklinghausen III	Bottrop city; Recklinghausen district (only Dorsten and Gladbeck municipalities)
2021	125	Bottrop – Recklinghausen III	Bottrop city; Recklinghausen district (only Dorsten and Gladbeck municipalities)
2025	124	Bottrop – Recklinghausen III	Bottrop city; Recklinghausen district (only Dorsten and Gladbeck municipalities)

== Members ==
The constituency has been held by the Social Democratic Party (SPD) during all but four Bundestag terms since 1949. It was first represented by Wilhelm Tenhagen of the SPD from 1949 to 1953. Johann Harnischfeger of the Christian Democratic Union (CDU) won it in 1953 and served three terms. Johann Wuwer regained it for the SPD in 1965 and served until 1980. Franz-Josef Mertens was then representative from 1980 to 1994, when he was succeeded by Dieter Grasedieck. In 2009, Michael Gerdes was elected representative. He was re-elected in 2013, 2017, and 2021. In 2025 Nicklas Kappe took the seat for the CDU for the first time since 1961.

Election	Member	Party	%
1949	Wilhelm Tenhagen	SPD	35.6
1953	Johann Harnischfeger	CDU	46.7
1957	Johann Harnischfeger	CDU	50.8
1961	Johann Harnischfeger	CDU	46.6
1965	Johann Wuwer	SPD	52.9
1969	Johann Wuwer	SPD	57.2
1972	Johann Wuwer	SPD	64.7
1976	Johann Wuwer	SPD	60.0
1980	Franz-Josef Mertens	SPD	59.9
1983	Franz-Josef Mertens	SPD	57.4
1987	Franz-Josef Mertens	SPD	58.2
1990	Franz-Josef Mertens	SPD	56.0
1994	Dieter Grasedieck	SPD	57.4
1998	Dieter Grasedieck	SPD	63.2
2002	Dieter Grasedieck	SPD	57.6
2005	Dieter Grasedieck	SPD	56.0
2009	Michael Gerdes	SPD	42.8
2013	Michael Gerdes	SPD	45.8
2017	Michael Gerdes	SPD	36.8
2021	Michael Gerdes	SPD	39.1
2025	Nicklas Kappe	CDU	31.7

== Election results ==
=== 2025 election ===
Federal election (2025): Bottrop – Recklinghausen III
Notes:	Blue background denotes the winner of the electorate vote. Pink background denotes a candidate elected from their party list. Yellow background denotes an electorate win by a list member, or other incumbent. A ✓ or ✗ denotes status of any incumbent, win or lose respectively.						
Party	Candidate	Votes	%	±%	Party votes	%	±%
CDU	Nicklas Kappe	49,625	31.7	▲4.7	45,953	29.3	▲4.3
SPD	Dustin Tix	46,276	29.5	▼9.5	36,280	23.1	▼11.9
AfD	Markus Mellerke	32,869	21.0	▲11.4	32,770	20.9	▲11.5
Greens	Heinz Müller	10,249	6.5	▼3.7	13,164	8.4	▼2.7
Left	Uwe Foullong	8,927	5.7	▲3.1	10,512	6.7	▲3.7
BSW					6,710	4.3	
FDP	Andreas Bucksteeg	4,185	2.7	▼5.0	5,422	3.5	▼6.5
Tierschutzpartei					2,471	1.6	▼0.1
PARTEI	Boris Benkhoff	2,426	1.5	▼0.7	955	0.6	▼0.6
FW	Mike Glaß	1,810	1.2		862	0.5	▼0.1
Volt					661	0.4	▼0.2
Team Todenhöfer					313	0.2	▼0.6
MLPD	Stefan Engel	252	0.2	▲0.1	98	0.1	0.0
PdF					243	0.2	▲0.1
dieBasis				▼0.9	238	0.2	▼0.6
BD					196	0.1	
Values					77	0.0	
MERA25					49	0.0	
Pirates							▼0.4
ÖDP							▼0.1
Gesundheitsforschung							▼0.1
Humanists							▼0.1
Bündnis C						0.0	0.0
SGP						0.0	0.0
Informal votes		1,340			982		
Total valid votes		156,619			156,977		
Turnout		157,959	80.9	▲6.3			
SPD hold	Majority	3,349	2.2				

=== 2021 election ===
Federal election (2021): Bottrop – Recklinghausen III
Notes:	Blue background denotes the winner of the electorate vote. Pink background denotes a candidate elected from their party list. Yellow background denotes an electorate win by a list member, or other incumbent. A ✓ or ✗ denotes status of any incumbent, win or lose respectively.						
Party	Candidate	Votes	%	±%	Party votes	%	±%
SPD	✓ Michael Gerdes	57,560	39.1	▲2.3	51,637	35.0	▲3.7
CDU	Sven Volmering	39,834	27.0	▼6.6	36,814	24.9	▼4.9
Greens	Kim Wiesweg	15,144	10.3	▲5.9	16,434	11.1	▲6.3
AfD	Detlef Bauer	14,075	9.6	▼2.3	13,899	9.4	▼3.0
FDP	Sebastian Steinzen	11,352	7.7	▲1.3	14,647	9.9	▼0.5
Left	Lisa Ellermann	3,887	2.6	▼3.7	4,484	3.0	▼3.8
Tierschutzpartei					2,536	1.7	▲0.8
PARTEI	Ingo Lilienthal	3,283	2.2		1,757	1.2	▲0.5
Team Todenhöfer					1,246	0.8	
dieBasis	Norbert Manniegel	1,373	0.9		1,048	0.7	
FW					661	0.4	▲0.3
Pirates					526	0.4	▼0.1
Volt					257	0.2	
DKP	Jörg Wingold	514	0.3	▼0.1	236	0.2	▼0.1
LIEBE					232	0.2	
ÖDP					200	0.1	▼0.1
Gesundheitsforschung					200	0.1	0.0
LfK					152	0.1	
NPD					150	0.1	▼0.2
V-Partei3					89	0.1	0.0
Humanists					85	0.1	0.0
LKR	Klausjochen Berger	226	0.2		81	0.1	
MLPD	Bärbel Kersken	108	0.1	▼0.1	78	0.1	0.0
du.					76	0.1	
PdF					50	0.0	
Bündnis C					31	0.0	
SGP					17	0.0	0.0
Informal votes		1,378			1,111		
Total valid votes		147,356			147,623		
Turnout		148,734	74.6	▼0.3			
SPD hold	Majority	17,726	12.1	▲8.9			

=== 2017 election ===
Federal election (2017): Bottrop – Recklinghausen III
Notes:	Blue background denotes the winner of the electorate vote. Pink background denotes a candidate elected from their party list. Yellow background denotes an electorate win by a list member, or other incumbent. A ✓ or ✗ denotes status of any incumbent, win or lose respectively.						
Party	Candidate	Votes	%	±%	Party votes	%	±%
SPD	✓ Michael Gerdes	55,128	36.8	▼9.0	47,013	31.2	▼8.9
CDU	Sven Volmering	50,334	33.6	▼2.9	44,967	29.9	▼5.0
AfD	Alfred Stegemann	17,756	11.8	▲8.1	18,710	12.4	▲8.3
FDP	Tristian Zielinski	9,667	6.5	▲4.8	15,741	10.5	▲7.0
Left	David Sperl	9,505	6.3	▲1.0	10,292	6.8	▲0.6
Greens	Andrea Swoboda	6,522	4.4	▲0.7	7,248	4.8	▼0.6
Tierschutzpartei					1,330	0.9	
AD-DEMOKRATEN					1,140	0.8	
PARTEI					1,062	0.7	▲0.4
Pirates					667	0.4	▼1.6
NPD					421	0.3	▼1.2
ÖDP					340	0.2	▼0.1
DKP	Gerhard Horst Dorka	691	0.5		337	0.2	
FW					294	0.2	▲0.1
Volksabstimmung					160	0.1	▼0.1
Gesundheitsforschung					143	0.1	
DM					129	0.1	
MLPD	Mazhar Hasan Alias	256	0.2	0.0	119	0.1	0.0
V-Partei³					115	0.1	
DiB					110	0.1	
BGE					107	0.1	
Die Humanisten					57	0.0	
SGP					12	0.0	0.0
Informal votes		1,983			1,328		
Total valid votes		149,859			150,514		
Turnout		151,842	74.9	▲3.0			
SPD hold	Majority	4,794	3.2	▼6.1			

=== 2013 election ===
Federal election (2013): Bottrop – Recklinghausen III
Notes:	Blue background denotes the winner of the electorate vote. Pink background denotes a candidate elected from their party list. Yellow background denotes an electorate win by a list member, or other incumbent. A ✓ or ✗ denotes status of any incumbent, win or lose respectively.						
Party	Candidate	Votes	%	±%	Party votes	%	±%
SPD	✓ Michael Gerdes	66,913	45.8	▲3.0	58,800	40.1	▲3.0
CDU	Sven Volmering	53,354	36.5	▲3.6	51,021	34.8	▲6.1
Left	Friedrich-Wilhelm Zachraj	7,827	5.4	▼4.0	9,153	6.2	▼4.4
AfD	Franz-Josef Ferme	5,530	3.8		6,034	4.1	
Greens	Elke Marita Stuckel-Lotz	5,277	3.6	▼2.1	7,998	5.5	▼1.5
Pirates	Hans Peter Winkelmann	3,613	2.5		3,029	2.1	▲0.5
FDP	Sebastian Steinzen	2,372	1.6	▼5.0	5,095	3.5	▼7.5
NPD					2,208	1.5	▲0.3
PRO					547	0.4	
PARTEI					495	0.3	
ÖDP	Marianne Dominas	986	0.7	▼0.1	465	0.3	0.0
REP					327	0.2	▼0.2
Volksabstimmung					280	0.2	▲0.1
BIG					243	0.2	
FW					177	0.1	
MLPD	Petra Braun	299	0.2	0.0	142	0.1	0.0
Nichtwahler					142	0.1	
Party of Reason					110	0.1	
RRP					79	0.1	▼0.1
Die Rechte					54	0.0	
PSG					53	0.0	0.0
BüSo					36	0.0	0.0
Informal votes		2,010			1,693		
Total valid votes		146,171			146,488		
Turnout		148,181	71.9	▲0.7			
SPD hold	Majority	13,559	9.3	▲0.6			

=== 2009 election ===
Federal election (2009): Bottrop – Recklinghausen III
Notes:	Blue background denotes the winner of the electorate vote. Pink background denotes a candidate elected from their party list. Yellow background denotes an electorate win by a list member, or other incumbent. A ✓ or ✗ denotes status of any incumbent, win or lose respectively.						
Party	Candidate	Votes	%	±%	Party votes	%	±%
SPD	Michael Gerdes	62,810	42.8	▼13.2	54,532	37.1	▼13.3
CDU	Sven Volmering	48,290	32.9	▲1.5	42,153	28.7	▲0.6
Left	Günter Blocks	13,765	9.4	▲4.3	15,624	10.6	▲4.3
FDP	Marc Liebehenz	9,710	6.6	▲4.1	16,171	11.0	▲4.5
Greens	Hans-Jürgen Reitmeyer	8,372	5.7	▲3.1	10,267	7.0	▲1.4
Pirates					2,261	1.5	
NPD	Dirk Tittmann	2,391	1.6	▲0.6	1,738	1.2	▲0.4
Tierschutzpartei					1,052	0.7	0.0
FAMILIE					804	0.5	▲0.2
REP					643	0.4	0.0
RENTNER					578	0.4	
ÖDP	Stefan Krix	1,138	0.8		447	0.3	
RRP					182	0.1	
MLPD	Petra Braun	243	0.2	0.0	128	0.1	0.0
DVU					114	0.1	
Volksabstimmung					102	0.1	0.0
Centre					74	0.1	0.0
BüSo					34	0.0	0.0
PSG					23	0.0	0.0
Informal votes		1,804			1,596		
Total valid votes		146,719			146,927		
Turnout		148,523	71.2	▼8.0			
SPD hold	Majority	14,520	9.9	▼14.7			

=== 2005 election ===
Federal election (2005): Bottrop – Recklinghausen III
Notes:	Blue background denotes the winner of the electorate vote. Pink background denotes a candidate elected from their party list. Yellow background denotes an electorate win by a list member, or other incumbent. A ✓ or ✗ denotes status of any incumbent, win or lose respectively.						
Party	Candidate	Votes	%	±%	Party votes	%	±%
SPD	✓ Dieter Grasedieck	91,918	56.0	▼1.6	82,681	50.4	▼2.7
CDU	Rudolf Haller	51,512	31.4	▲1.0	46,084	28.1	▼0.7
Left	Reinhild Reska	8,348	5.1	▲3.8	10,443	6.4	▲5.1
Greens	Andrea Swoboda	4,245	2.6	▼1.3	9,180	5.6	▼0.9
FDP	Fridun Nazaradeh	4,168	2.5	▼2.2	10,691	6.5	▼0.48
Tierschutzpartei	Frank Bresonik	1,801	1.1		1,167	0.7	▲0.4
NPD	Martin Seelert	1,678	1.0		1,297	0.8	▲0.6
REP					707	0.4	▼0.1
Familie					637	0.4	▲0.2
GRAUEN					460	0.3	▲0.1
MLPD	Petra Braun	214	0.1		183	0.1	
From Now on... Democracy Through Referendum					112	0.1	
Independent	Adnan Döngelli	110	0.1				
PBC					53	0.0	
Socialist Equality Party					86	0.0	
Centre					53	0.0	
BüSo					29	0.0	0.0
Informal votes		2,102			2,146		
Total valid votes		163,994			163,950		
Turnout		166,096	79.2	▼0.48			
SPD hold	Majority	40,406	24.6				
