= Nicklas Kappe =

German politician (born 1996)

Member of the Bundestag
- Assuming office March 2025
- Succeeding: Michael Gerdes
- Constituency: Bottrop – Recklinghausen III

Personal details
- Born: 11 November 1996 (age 29) Gelsenkirchen
- Party: Christian Democratic Union

Nicklas Kappe (born 11 November 1996 in Gelsenkirchen) is a German politician who was elected as a member of the Bundestag in 2025. He has been a member of the city council of Dorsten and the district council of Recklinghausen since 2020.
