= Hahnenbach (disambiguation) =

Hahnenbach may refer to:

- Hahnenbach, a municipality in Rhineland-Palatinate, Germany
- Hahnenbach (Boye), a river of North Rhine-Westphalia, Germany
- Hahnenbach (Wiedau), a river of Lower Saxony, Germany
