= A. R. Penck =

German painter

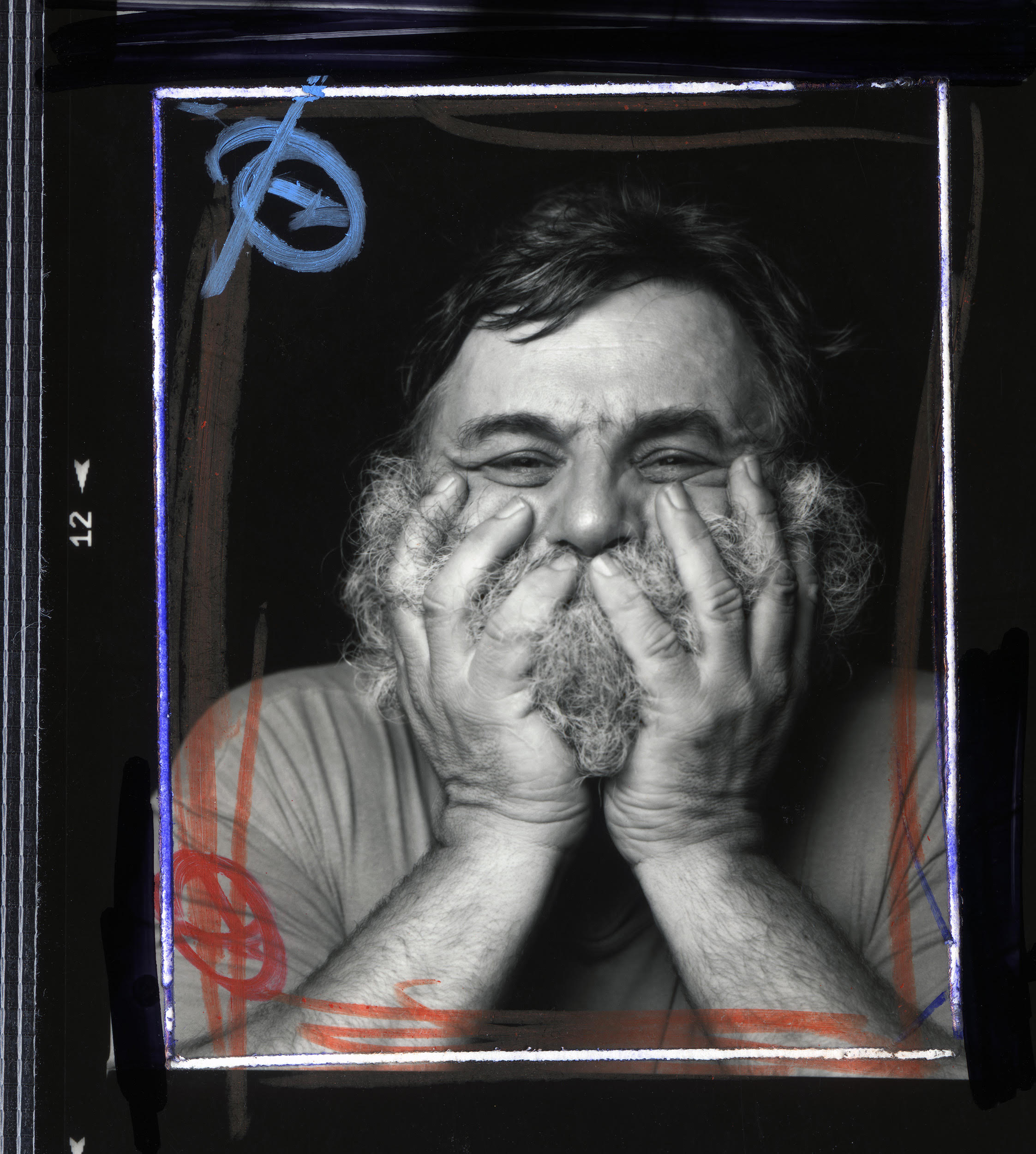
- A. R. Penck, Nuremberg 1994, portrait by Oliver Mark
- Born: Ralf Winkler; 5 October 1939; Dresden, Germany
- Died: 2 May 2017 (aged 77); Zurich, Switzerland
- Known for: Painting; printmaking; sculpture; free jazz

Ralf Winkler (alias A. R. Penck, who also used the pseudonyms Mike Hammer, T. M., Mickey Spilane, Theodor Marx, "a. Y." or just "Y" 5 October 1939 – 2 May 2017) was a German painter, printmaker, sculptor, and jazz drummer. A neo-expressionist, he became known for his visual style, reminiscent of the influence of primitive art.

== Life and career ==
=== East Germany (until 1980) ===
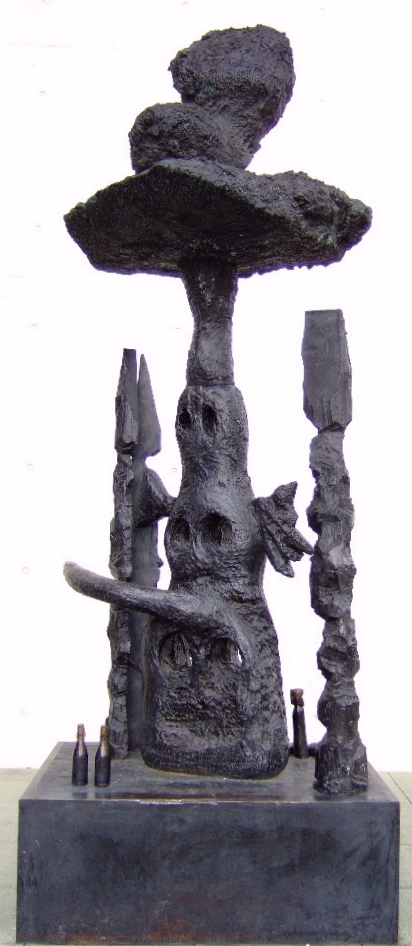
Future of Soldiers (1995) (Kunstmuseum, Bonn)

Penck was born in Dresden, Germany. In his early teens, he took painting and drawing lessons with Jürgen Böttcher, known by the pseudonym Strawalde, and joined with him to form the renegade artists' group Erste Phalanx Nedserd ("Dresden" spelled backward). The group sought artistic work without compromise. For this reason, their members refused to study at an academy. The group members were also denied membership in the Association of Visual Artists of the GDR. They, therefore, had to earn a living as workers or craftsmen. He later worked for a year as a trainee draftsman at the state advertising agency in Dresden. From 1955 to 1956, Winkler was a draftsman for the publicity agency DEWAG. Since 1956, he attempted but failed to gain admission to the Dresden Academy of Fine Arts and the Berlin University of the Arts in East Berlin. Penck worked for several years as a stoker, a newspaper deliverer, a margarine packer and a night watchman. He also had a small acting role in the film Vintage 45 (1966), directed by Jürgen Böttcher.

In 1966, Winkler became a candidate to join the Association of Plastic Artists, now under the artistic pseudonym A. R. Penck. which was chosen after the geologist Albrecht Penck. Since 1969, he had increasingly problems with the Ministry of State Security of the GDR. His paintings were confiscated and his membership in the Association of Visual Artists of the GDR (VBK) was rejected.

Winkler was one of the founding members, in May 1971, together with Steffen Terk, Wolfgang Opitz and Harald Gallasch, of the artist group GAP, which existed until 1976. Since 1973, he worked under the pseudonyms Mike Hammer and TM. After serving the military service in 1974, he was awarded the Will Grohmann Prize, in 1975, by the Academy of Arts in West Berlin. By this time, the state security control over him also increased. In 1976, Penck met the West German painter Jörg Immendorff, with whom he would work together in the following years. In their work, they campaigned for the abolition of the inner German border, and for the dissidents, among them Rudolf Bahro and Robert Havemann. Since 1976, he also signed simply Y. In 1977, he had some of his paintings confiscated. In May 1979, several of his works and records were destroyed during a break-in into his studio.

Penck participated at Documenta 5 in Kassel in 1972, and also at Documenta 7 (1982) and Documenta IX in 1992. He was meant to exhibit at the Documenta 6 (1977), but was prevented to do so by the influence of an unofficial employee of the State Security of the GDR on a Hessian parliamentarian.

=== After 1980 ===
On 3 August 1980, he moved to West Germany. He first lived in Kerpen, southwest of Cologne. After emigrating, Penck became one of the foremost exponents of new figuration, alongside Jörg Immendorff, Georg Baselitz and Markus Lüpertz. Their work was shown by major museums and galleries in the West throughout the 1980s. They were included in a number of important shows including the famous Zeitgeist exhibition in the Martin Gropius Bau museum and the New Art show at the Tate in 1983. In 1981, the Goethe Foundation awarded him the Rembrandt Prize in Basel, Switzerland. In 1983, Winkler moved to London, England, and was awarded the Aachen Art Prize for 1985. In 1988 he participated in the exhibition Made in Cologne. In the same year, he was appointed professor of painting at the Academy of Arts in Düsseldorf. Some of his students are Antje Dorn, Susanne Themlitz, Joanna Danovska, Yoshitomo Nara, Marta Klonowska, Gesine Kikol and Andrea C. Hoffer.

After retiring, in 2003, he moved to Dublin, Ireland, where he would live and work the following years. At the time of his death, Penck lived and worked in Berlin, Düsseldorf, Dublin and New York City. He died on 2 May 2017 in Zürich at the age of 77.

== Works ==
An autodidact, he created in his paintings "worlds" and "experience spaces", filled with symbolic abbreviations. He used stick figures and graphic icons that seem reminiscent of cave paintings, Asian calligraphy and graffiti art. In the 1960s and 1970s, he created a series of paintings and sculptures that he called Standarts, a conflation of "standard" and "art", with an echo of the German word for banner or flag, Standarte. By this term, Penck understood an art form that used simple and archaic pictorial symbols, such as traffic signs or trademarks. In the 1980s, he became known worldwide for his paintings with pictographic, neo-primitivist imagery of human figures and other totemic forms. He was included in many important shows both in London and New York City.

Penck's sculptures, although less known, evoke the same primitive themes as his paintings and drawings and use common materials, such as wood, bottles, cardboard boxes, cans, packing tape, tin and aluminum foil, wire and paste, all done with simplicity and spontaneity.

A keen drummer, he was a member and co-founder, with Frank Wollny, of the free jazz group Triple Trip Touch (aka T.T.T. or TTT) and had the opportunity to play with some of the best Jazz musicians of the late 1980s, including Butch Morris, Frank Wright, Billy Bang, Louis Moholo and Frank Lowe. He organized events at his country mansion in Heimbach involving installations by Lennie Lee, performances by Anna Homler and paintings by Christine Kuhn, in 1990.

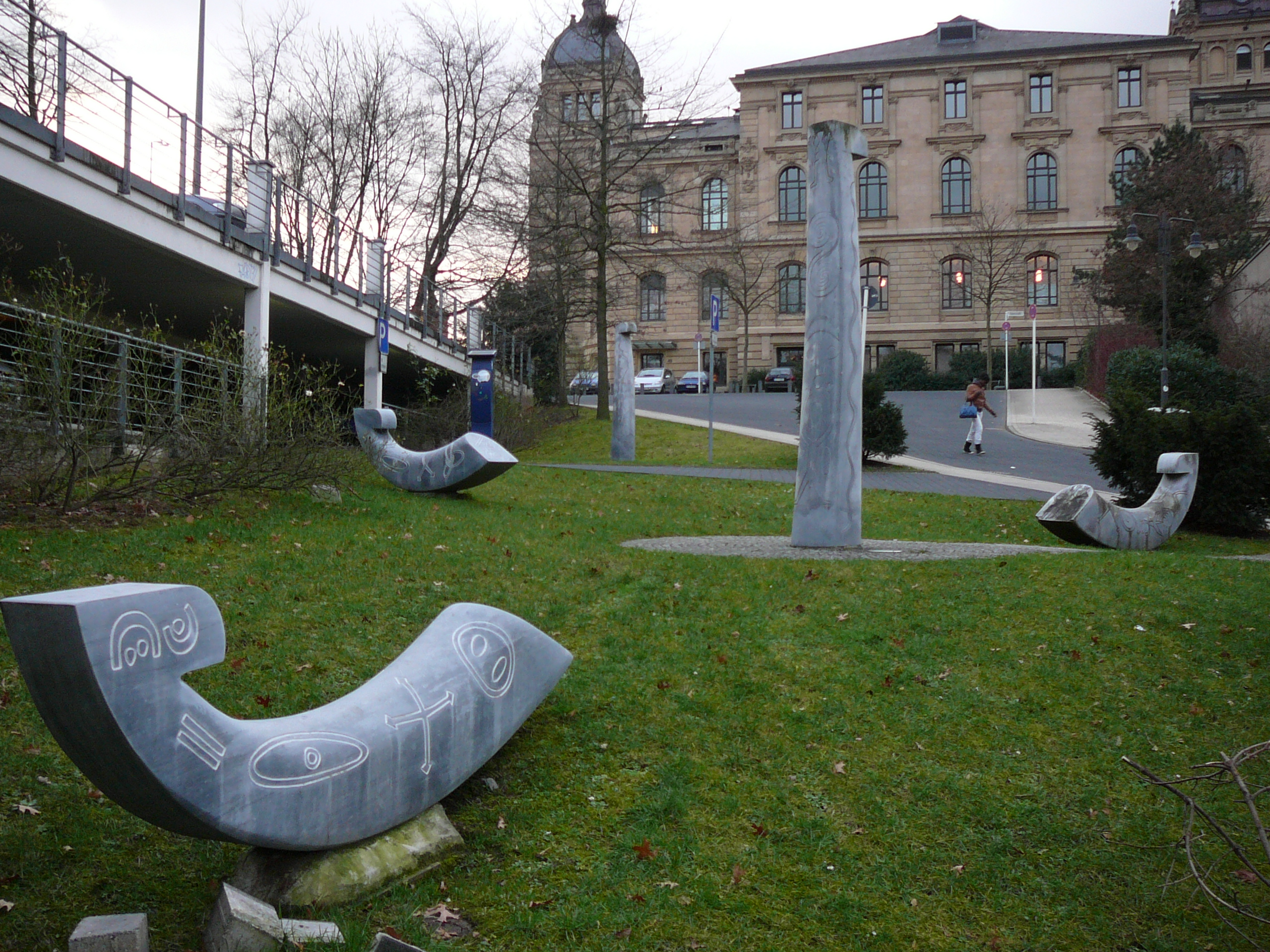
Die himmlischen Stürzer in Wuppertal

He also wrote poems, essays and theoretical texts.

== Exhibitions (Selected) ==
- 1968: Deutsche Avantgarde 3: A.R. Penck, Bilder, Galerie Hake, Köln.
- 1968: A.R. Penck: Erstes Training mit Standart, Galerie Michael Werner, Köln.
- 1972: Documenta 5, Fridericianum, Kassel.
- 1977: Documenta 6, Fridericianum, Kassel.
- 1982: Documenta 7, Fridericianum, Kassel.
- 1984: Venice Biennale, Venice.
- 1992: Documenta 9, Fridericianum, Kassel.

== Art market ==
The most expensive painting by Penck in the art market was Welt des Adlers I (World of the Eagle I) (1981), which sold for $687.201 at Sotheby's London, on 11 February 2020.

== Public collections ==
A. R. Penck is represented in many public collections, including:

- Art Institute of Chicago
- Berardo Collection Museum, Lisbon
- Galerie Neue Meister, Dresden
- Goulandris Museum of Contemporary Art, Athens
- Hamburger Kunsthalle, Hamburg
- Hugh Lane Gallery, Dublin
- Metropolitan Museum of Art, New York
- Migros Museum of Contemporary Art, Zürich
- Musée National d'Art Moderne, Paris
- Museum für Moderne Kunst, Frankfurt/Main
- Museum Ludwig, Cologne
- Museum of Contemporary Art, Los Angeles
- Museum of Fine Arts, Boston
- Museum of Modern Art, New York
- National Gallery of Art, Washington, D.C.
- Pinakothek der Moderne, Munich
- Städel Museum, Frankfurt am Main
- Stedelijk Museum, Amsterdam
- Tate Modern, London
