= Hahnenbach (Boye) =

River in North Rhine-Westphalia, Germany

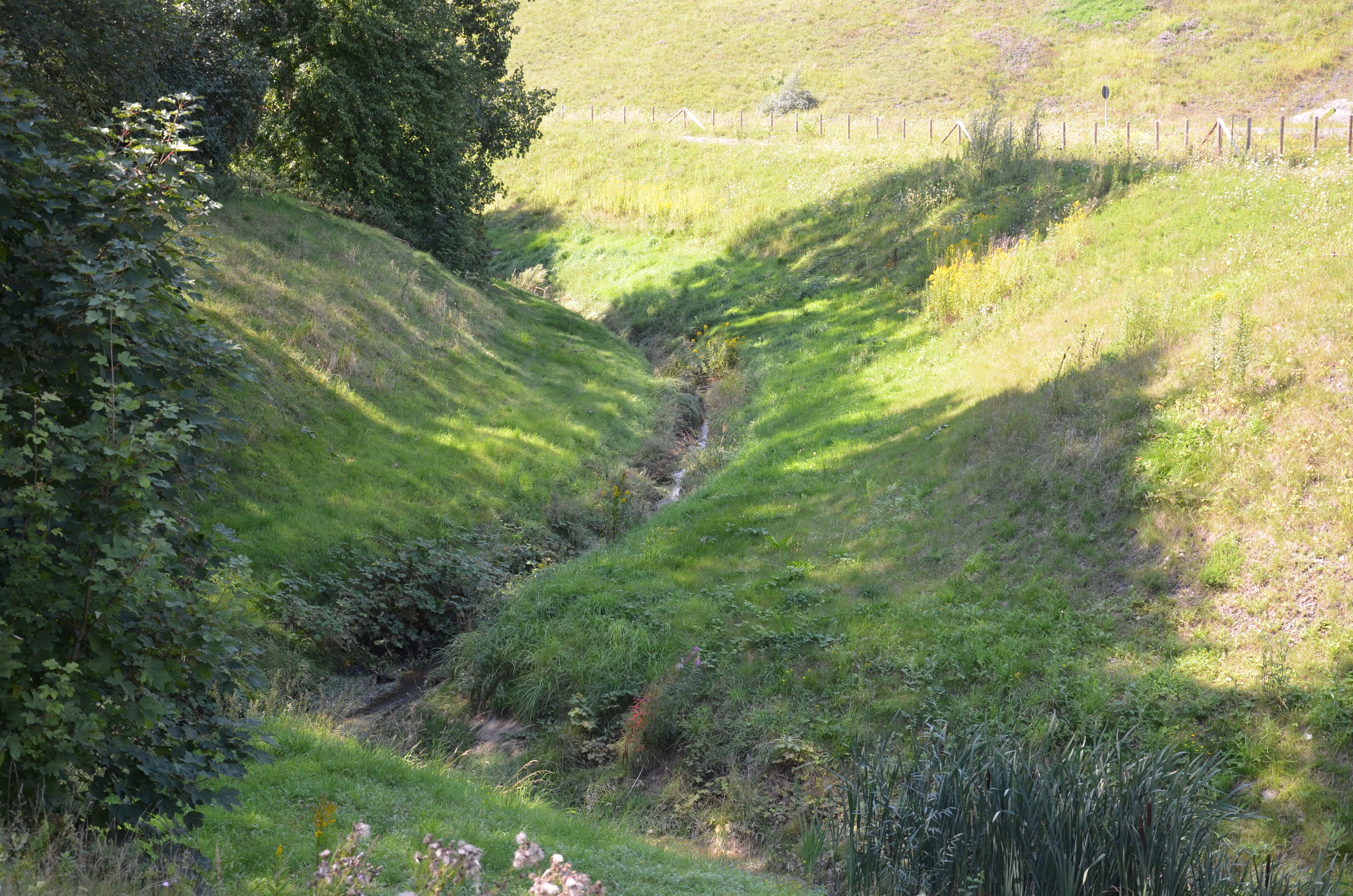

Location
- Country: Germany
- States: North Rhine-Westphalia

Physical characteristics
- Mouth
  - location: Boye
  - coordinates: 51.5404°N 6.9942°E

Basin features
- Progression: Boye→ Emscher→ Rhine→ North Sea

Hahnenbach is a small river of North Rhine-Westphalia, Germany. It is 2.9 km long and flows into the Boye near Bottrop.

== Similar rivers by name ==
It is one of five rivers and streams in North Rhine-Westphalia named Hahnenbach.

== See also ==
- List of rivers of North Rhine-Westphalia
