= Schloss Beck =

Baroque château in Germany

Coordinates: 51°36′48″N 6°58′41″E

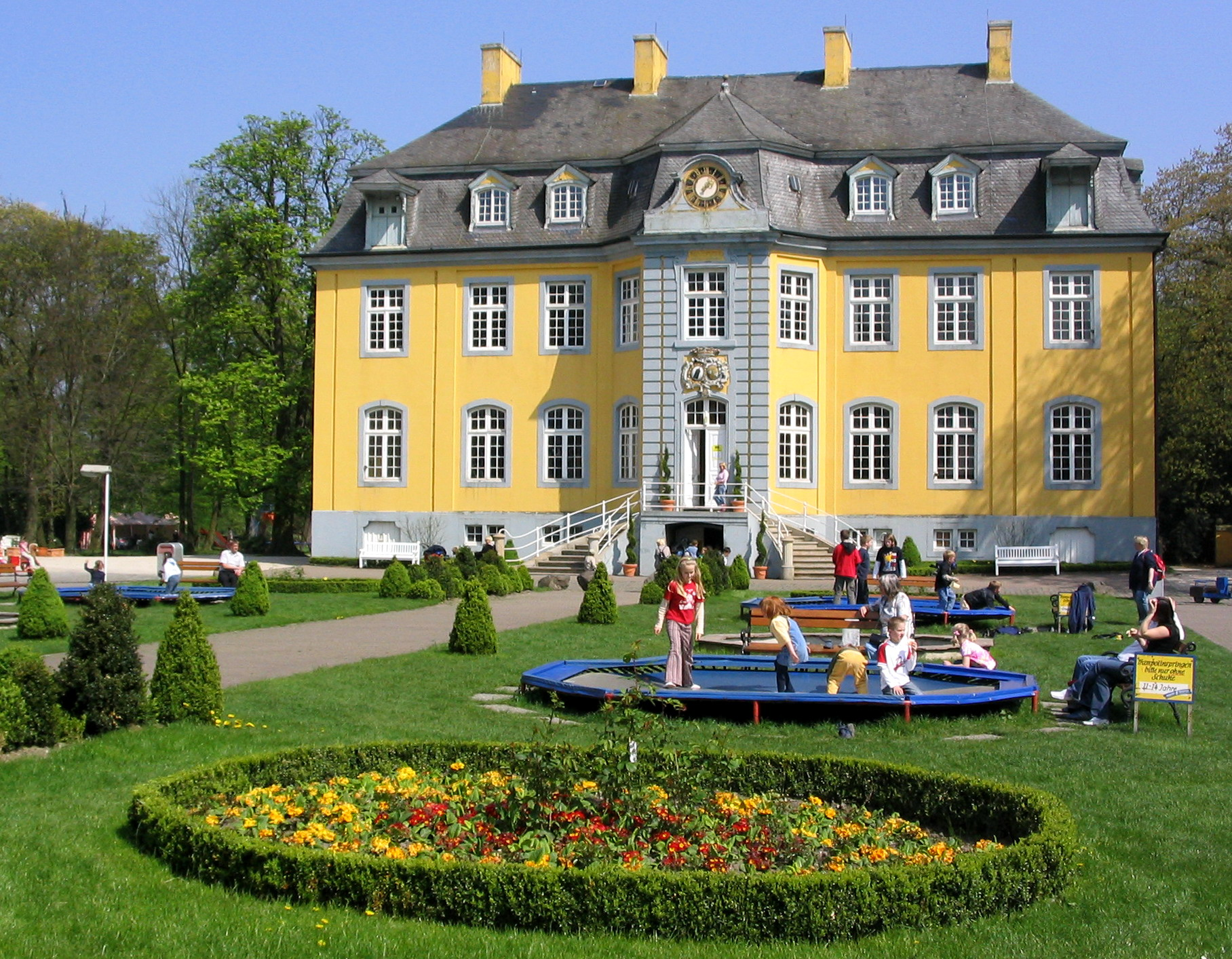
Beck Castle

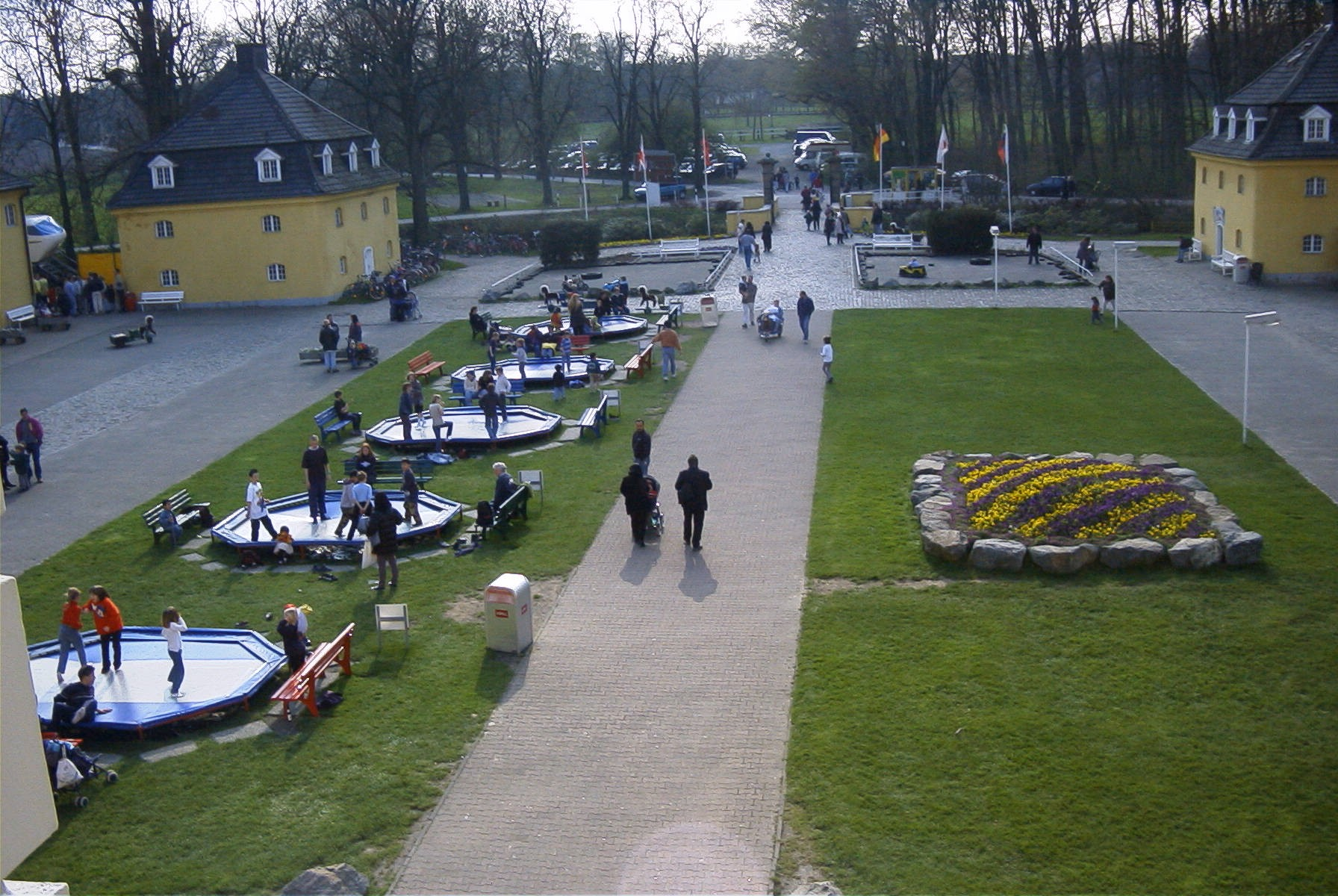
Entrance area and forecourt of Schloss Beck.

Schloss Beck (Beck Castle) is a Baroque castle in Bottrop, Germany, planned and built as a “maison de plaisance” between 1766 and 1777 by Johann Conrad Schlaun. It is currently run as an amusement park.

== History ==
Although the building was designed as a palatial residence, by the end of the 18th century Beck Castle had become a distillery for schnaps. It came into the possession of the Metternich family around 1850.

Despite the Second World War the castle remained intact, and in 1958 the Hibernia Mining Society bought the property. However, Hibernia was only interested in the grounds, and offered the castle building to all interested parties for free. Because of the responsibility and the expense of maintaining it, nobody wanted to acquire it until 1966, when a certain Karl Kuchenbäcker bought it. Because of years of neglect, the castle had to be completely restored, and to provide money for the restoration Kuchenbäcker opened it to the public.

Following Kuchenbäcker's death (on 28 December 2004), his family put the castle and amusement park up for sale. It is now a protected historical monument.

== The amusement park ==
Beck Castle is very popular with people in the surrounding area, especially for children from 3 to 14 years, because this small theme park is not well known and is rarely overcrowded. For the locals, it is a place to go with the family to enjoy the peace and quiet and to let the children play safely. The park management offers Christmas parties and weddings in large public rooms, as well as nightly dances and recitations. Beck's moated castle, which is a baroque architectural monument in Westphalia, include a haunted cellar.

The attractions include:

- Wendy house
- Bumper cars
- Adventure simulator
- Trampolines
- Horse-drawn carriages
- A diorama with 1000 moving figures in the castle
- A haunted basement
- Railroad
- Nature studies path
- Cart track
- Playground
- Big wheel
- Swing boats
- Electric race track for horses
- Places for barbecues
- Paddle and rowing boats
- Carousel with aeroplanes
- Roller coaster
