= Andrea C. Hoffer =

German painter

Andrea C. Hoffer (born 1964 in Kirchhellen) is a German painter.

== Life and work ==
Andrea C. Hoffer studied costume and set design at the Kunstakademie Düsseldorf from 1992 to 1994 in the class of Karl Kneidl. Afterwards she studied painting under A. R. Penck at the Kunstakademie Düsseldorf and received her master's degree in 1999. Hoffer lives and works in Tobago and Düsseldorf.

== Solo exhibitions (selection) ==
- 2011 Raum, Kunstverein Würzburg
- 2009 Traveller, Kunstverein Siegen
- 2007 onextwo, National Museum of Trinidad and Tobago
- 2007 At noon, Solinger Kunstverein

== Group exhibitions (selection) ==
- 2022 DIE GROSSE Kunstausstellung NRW 2022, Kunstmuseum Kunstpalast, Düsseldorf
- 2021 Crossover, KUMA Art Museum, Seoul
- 2019 Blue is hot and Red is cold – Klasse A.R. Penck, Kunsthalle Düsseldorf
- 2010 10x10x10 – Bilder und Objekte, Kunstverein Siegen
- 1997 Furige Tongen, Sint Jacobskerk, Gent
- 1994 Spectaculum, Museum am Ostwall, Dortmund, Germany

== Publications (selection) ==
- Gregor Jansen, Robert Fleck, Gerolf Schülke, Dieter Ronte, Frank Schlag, Frank Wollny (Eds.): Klasse A. R. Penck. Kettler, Bönen, 2022. ISBN 978-3-86206-898-2.
- Welten, Galerie Frank Schlag & Cie., 2009.
- Malerei/Paintings, Galerie Frank Schlag & Cie., 2005.
- West Indies, Beck & Eggeling, Leipzig, 1999. ISBN 978-3-9309-1927-7.
