= Halden sculptures =

Public sculptures in Germany

Halden are public sculptures situated atop historic coal mine slag piles in the Ruhrgebiet region of Germany. Halden celebrate the industrial heritage and culture of the Ruhrgebiet, and act as representations of regional identity in the region's ongoing transition to a postindustrial landscape. These artificial hills – the byproducts of 170 years of mining – have been re-landscaped as green recreational areas and observation points. Today each Halde is often crowned by an installation (for example, totems, walkable structures or light sculptures) that celebrates the region's industrial heritage and transformation. The artworks double as unique landmarks and photo spots, while the grassy slopes have become "green oases" with trails and sports areas.

== Notable Halden sculptures ==
Halde Haniel (Bottrop) – "Totems" and amphitheater. On the Haniel spoil hill (185 m asl) Basque artist Augustin Ibarrola installed 100 painted railway sleepers ("Totems") in 2002. The vertical sleepers symbolize the union of industrial space and nature, transforming the former mining dump into an open-air art installation. The summit also features a circular "Bergarena" amphitheatre (built of mining spoil in a Greek-theatre layout) used for performances. (A summit cross and Stations of the Cross were added in the 1980s–90s, reflecting the site's mining heritage.)

Tetrahedron Bottrop (Halde Beckstraße) – Walkable tetrahedron (1995). Atop the Beckstraße heap in Bottrop stands a steel tetrahedral framework designed by Wolfgang Christ (opened 3 Oct 1995). Each edge of the tetrahedron is 60 m long, and the shape rests on four concrete pillars (9 m tall). In total it contains ~1,500 m of steel tubing weighing 210 t. Visitors can climb internal stairways and platforms: the structure reaches about 40 m height above its concrete legs, with a viewing deck near the top. A light sculpture "Fraktal" by Jürgen Fischer crowns the summit. The Tetrahedron (officially Haldenereignis Emscherblick) was built as an IBA Emscher Park project, and is now a landmark and panoramic viewpoint.

Tiger & Turtle – Magic Mountain (Duisburg) – Walkable roller-coaster (2011). On the Heinrich-Hildebrand-Höhe (Angerpark, Duisburg-Angerhausen) stands Tiger & Turtle – Magic Mountain, a 20 m–high sculpture by Heike Mutter and Ulrich Genth. Made of galvanized steel, it resembles a winding roller coaster with staircases throughout. Its floor area is roughly 40×41 m and accessible up to 13 m height; one loop is closed to form the art piece. Up to 880 LED lights line the structure, making it glow at night. Since opening in Nov 2011, Tiger & Turtle has been a signature "walkable coaster" landmark – scenic day and night – with guided tours often run by the Duisburg tourism board.

Halde Norddeutschland (Neukirchen-Vluyn) – Hallenhaus and Himmelstreppe. This 102 m heap features two modern art structures. One is the Hallenhaus (2006) by Planergruppe OBSERVATORIUM (Rotterdam): a steel-frame "hall" built atop the summit. The other is the Himmelstreppe ("Stairway to Heaven," 2007): a 359-step outdoor staircase ascending ~52 m from base to top, with LED-lit handrails. Together these create illuminated landmarks – the skeletal Hallenhaus greeting visitors even at night, and the Himmelstreppe guiding hikers skyward.

Halde Hoheward (Herten/Recklinghausen) – Horizontobservatorium, sundial, dragon bridge. The Hoheward landscape park (111 m summit) contains multiple artworks on its crest. The most famous is the Horizontobservatorium (opened 2004), consisting of two giant steel arches (span 88 m) that mark celestial alignments. One arch traces the meridian (south-north), the other the equator (east-west). At the center stands a horizontal sundial: an 8.5–9 m obelisk tipped with a sphere, which casts shadows to tell the time. Visitors reach the summit via over 500 steps or winding paths, including the "Dragon Bridge", a red-and-gray steel pedestrian span with a dragon-head motif.

Rheinelbe Halde (Gelsenkirchen) – Heavenly Ladder and sculpture forest. On the Rheinelbe spoil heap (60 m high) Herman Prigann created a Sculpture Forest of installations (1996–2005) made to resemble industrial wreckage. One notable piece is the Himmelsleiter (1999) or Heavenly Ladder: a steep concrete stairway of 35 massive blocks leading to the summit. When crossed by a spiral access path, the paired elements complete each other – a vivid light-and-dark, natural-vs-industrial tableau.

Halde Rheinpreußen (Moers) – Das Geleucht (mine lamp) (2007). Halde Rheinpreußen features the Geleucht, a giant miner's lamp memorial by Otto Piene. Conceived in 1999 and installed in 2007, it consists of 35 red lamp poles illuminating an 8,000 m² area, plus a 28 m‐tall, 115‐tonne steel structure shaped like a miner's lamp. The Geleucht sits on the summit and is lit nightly since its dedication (Sept 17, 2007).

Halde Rungenberg (Gelsenkirchen-Buer) – Night Signs (1992) and rail field. This twin-peaked heap (60 m high) was artistically "capped" in 1992 by Hermann Eschricter and Klaus Noculak. Their "Night Signs" are two huge searchlights at the summit whose beams cross in the night sky. Mid-slope on the upper plateau is a field of 5,500 m of coal-rail track pieces arranged partly at angles, symbolizing the region's railway heritage.

Halde Brockenscheidt (Waltrop) – Spurwerkturm (circa 2000). On this 14 m hill stands the Spurwerkturm by Jan Bormann. It is a 20 m–high pyramid-like lattice of 1,000 m of reclaimed railway rails. Completed around 2000, the wooden-steel structure has a dense base and three tapering "tails," creating a striking silhouette.

Schurenbachhalde (Essen) – "Bramme" (for the Ruhr Area) (1999). On the 50 m Schurenbach halde in Essen-Altenessen, American sculptor Richard Serra placed a single massive steel slab called Bramme für das Ruhrgebiet. Cast in 1999 and set into a slight westward-tilt of 3°, the 14.5 m‐tall, 13.5 m‐deep, 115-tonne plate of rolled steel is sunk into the ground.

Halde Schwerin (Castrop-Rauxel) – Sundial + wind turbines (2003). At the Spitze der Halde Schwerin (151 m) stands a monumental outdoor sundial by Jan Bormann. It consists of 24 vertical columns and a central gnomon (hand) made of steel, reaching 10 m tall. Around the base are modern wind turbines.

== Geographic and environmental context ==
The Ruhr's Halden are artificial hills composed of taubes Gestein (waste rock) dumped during coal mining. Spanning much of the 19th–20th centuries, Ruhr mining left over a hundred such heaps. After mines closed, many halden were graded and re-vegetated: today they rise as grassy ridges or cones up to 180 m above sea level. They serve as vantage points over the flat Ruhr landscape and have been integrated into regional parks and cycling/hiking networks. Forests and meadows now cover most slopes, turning "gray" piles into green recreational areas. Many halden also have panoramic paths or stairways (e.g. Himmelstreppe at Norddeutschland) leading to their grassy summits.

== History and cultural significance ==
The Halden sculpture movement grew from late–20th-century efforts to revitalize the post-industrial Ruhr. A key driver was the International Building Exhibition (IBA) Emscher Park (1989–1999), a regional renewal program. IBA funded numerous projects to repurpose derelict mining sites and slag heaps, aiming to preserve industrial heritage while creating new public spaces. Under IBA, artists and architects were commissioned to transform halden into landmarks (for example, Herman Prigann's Rheinelbe works and Michael Hecker's Himmelstreppe). These projects symbolized the region's shift from coal to culture. As Ruhrtourismus notes, the halden artworks "make color out of gray" – colorful totems, lamps and sculpture providing unique landmarks. In the early 21st century, additional funding (from EU, state and private sources, and programs like Route der Industriekultur and Urbane Künste Ruhr) continued to support art on halden. Today the halden sculptures explicitly celebrate the Ruhr's mining heritage – acting as monuments that represent regional identity in the area's transition to a post-industrial landscape.

== Current cultural role ==
Halden sculptures now play a prominent role in Ruhr culture and tourism. They are promoted as anchor points on the Industrial Heritage Trail, and appear on regional guides and photo itineraries. Many halden host community events: for example Halde Norddeutschland's summit hosts the annual Heaven & Hill electronic music festival each May. The viewpoints and artworks attract photographers and hikers year-round. Tourist boards highlight them as "must-see" lookout spots. Guided tours (walking or by bus) often include halden: Duisburg, for instance, offers evening tours of Tiger & Turtle, the "only roller coaster in the world" that visitors can climb. The Hoheward park maintains a visitor centre with exhibits and free guided tours of the halden site (in German and English). In short, halden sculptures serve as symbols of renewal: they visibly connect past and present, draw tourism, and host cultural and sporting activities (running races, art walks, etc.).

== Visiting information ==
All major halden sites are freely accessible to the public, typically via marked trails or stairs. For example, Hoheward, Haniel and Schwerin parks have parking areas at their bases and are open 24/7 (no admission fee). Public transport often stops near the base: Duisburg's tram route 903 stops at "Tiger & Turtle" (Duisburg), while Bottrop's city bus NE19 serves the Tetrahedron. The Ruhrtourismus and Route Industriekultur websites (including halden.ruhr) provide maps, directions and local visitor tips. In general, halden can be visited in any season; spring/summer offers green vistas, while autumn and winter skies make the artworks dramatic silhouettes. Note that some installations require climbing steep steps (e.g. Tiger & Turtle has 249 steps, Hoheward over 500 steps); visitors should wear sturdy shoes. On clear days the summits afford sweeping views of the Ruhr's industrial and urban landscape (often as far as distant cities). Nearby amenities vary by site: some have snack stands or centres (Hoheward has a visitors' center with café), while others rely on nearby towns for services. For planning, see regional tourism sites and the dedicated halden portal (http://www.halden.ruhr).

== List of Halden sculptures ==
- Halde Haniel
- Tetrahedron
- Tiger and Turtle
- Rheinpreußen
- Rheinelbe
- Halde Norddeutschland
- Halde Hoheward
- Schurenbachhalde
- Halde Rungenberg
- Halde Brockenscheidt
