= Christian Scheuß =

German author and journalist

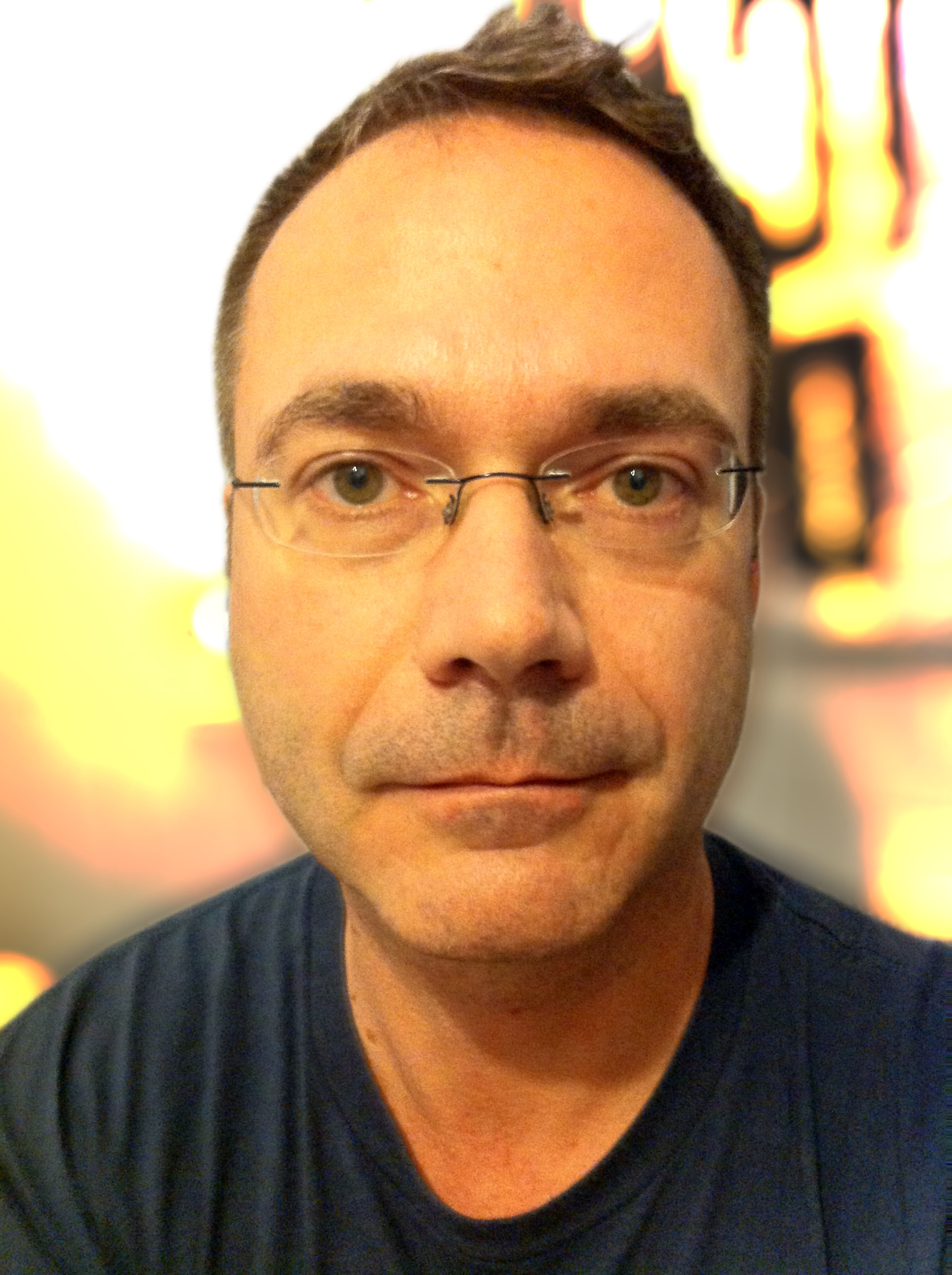
Scheuß in 2012

Christian Scheuß (born 14 January 1966 in Bottrop) is a German author and journalist.

== Life ==
After school and a first apprenticeship as technician for consumer electronics he changed to journalism. His education as journalist started 1991 at the local radio station Radio Emscher-Lippe in Northrhine-Westphalia. Between 1995 and 2003 he was chief editor of the gay magazine Rosa Zone and the gay newspaper Queer. In 2003 he founded – together with the journalist Micha Schulze the company Queer Communications GmbH in Cologne. As a non-fiction author Scheuß has written several books on LGBT and sex topics. Scheuß lives in Cologne.

== Selected works ==
- Erotic Bodystyling, Bruno Gmünder Verlag, 1996
- Fremdgehen macht Glücklich – Neue schwule Lebens- und Liebesformen, Schwarzkopf & Schwarzkopf Verlag, 2004
- Gay Online Dating, Bruno Gmünder Verlag, 2005
- Poppers, Himmelstürmer Verlag, 2006
- Das Schwanzbuch, Bruno Gmünder Verlag, 2006
- Alles, was Familie ist, Schwarzkopf & Schwarzkopf Verlag, 2007
- Das Arschbuch, Bruno Gmünder Verlag, 2007
- Das Orgasmusmbuch, Bruno Gmünder Verlag, 2007
- Sexparty! Mehr Spaß bei Dreier, Gangbang und Orgien, Himmelstürmer Verlag, August 2007
- Toys For Boys, Bruno Gmünder Verlag, 2009
- The Dick Book: Tuning Your Favorite Body Part, Bruno Gmünder Verlag, August 2012
- The Ass Book: Staying on Top of Your Bottom, Bruno Gmünder Verlag, Februar 2013
