= Tetrahedron in Bottrop =

Sculpture and observation tower in Germany

Coordinates: 51.527°N 6.960°E

- Bottrop Tetraeder
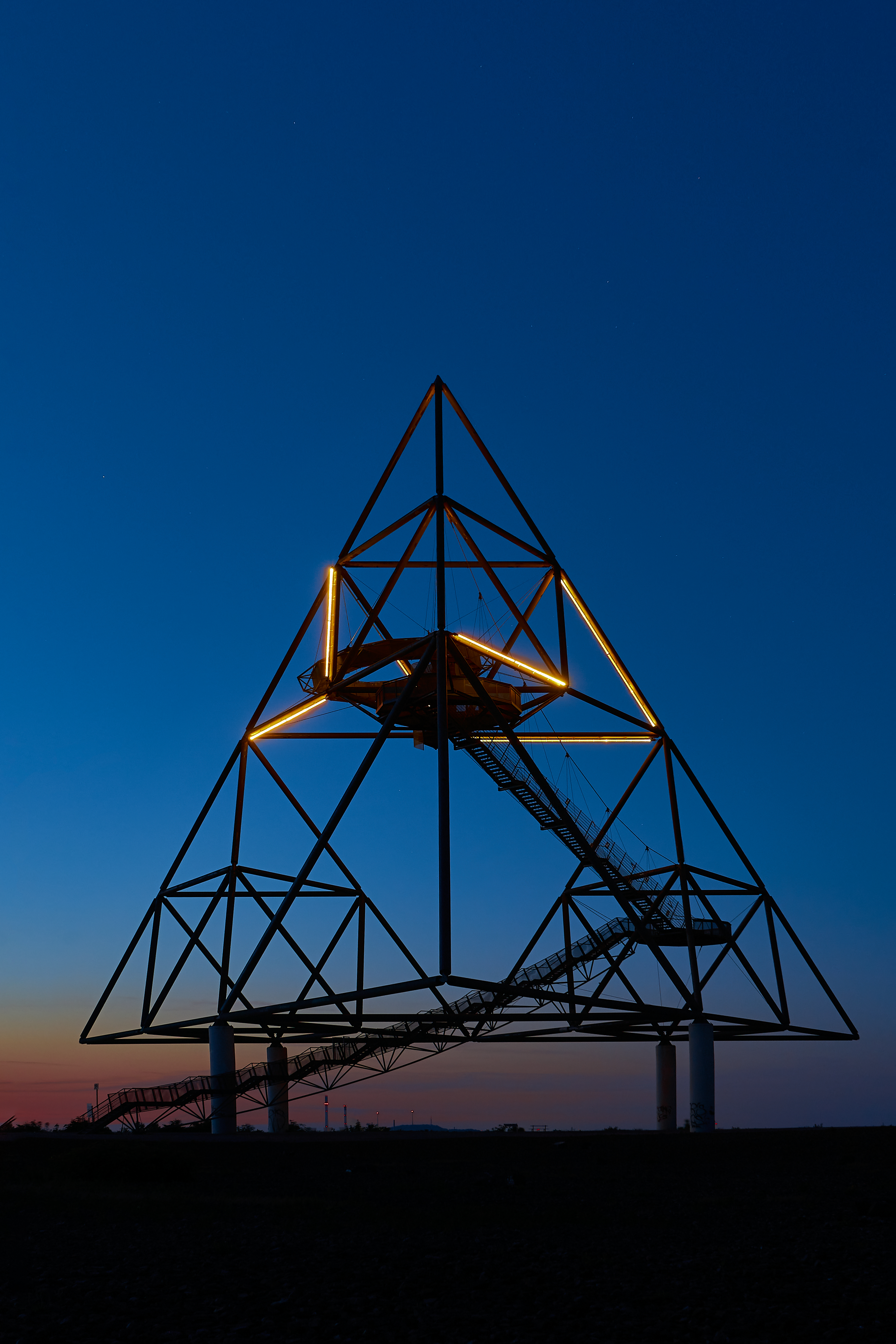
- Tetrahedron from south
- Interactive map of the Tetrahedron in Bottrop area
- Alternative names: Haldenereignis Emscherblick

General information
- Type: Halden sculpture
- Location: Beckstraße 57a, Bottrop, Germany
- Construction started: 1994
- Opened: 3 October 1995
- Cost: €1.2 million

Height
- Height: 50 metres (160 ft)
- Observatory: 38 metres (125 ft)

Dimensions
- Weight: 210 tonnes (230 tons)
- Other dimensions: 60 metres (200 ft) side length

Technical details
- Material: Steel tubing, concrete columns
- Floor count: 3

Design and construction
- Architect: Wolfgang Christ
- Structural engineer: Klaus Bollinger
- Other designers: Jürgen LIT Fischer (light sculpture)
- Main contractor: Rüter GmbH

Website
- tetraeder-bottrop.de

The Tetrahedron in Bottrop (German: Bottrop Tetraeder, or, officially, Haldenereignis Emscherblick) is a walkable steel structure in the form of a tetrahedron with a side length of sixty metres, resting on four nine-metre-tall concrete pillars. It is located in Bottrop, Germany, on top of the mine dump Halde Beckstraße and serves as the town's landmark. It was opened on German Unity Day 3 October 1995. The Tetrahedron is one of several Halden sculptures in the Ruhrgebiet region located atop slag piles, remnants of the region's industrial era.

The design is reminiscent of the Sierpinski tetrix: placing four half-size tetrahedra corner to corner and adding an octahedron in the middle, a full-size tetrahedron is formed; this process can be repeated recursively to form larger and larger tetrahedra.

== Construction ==
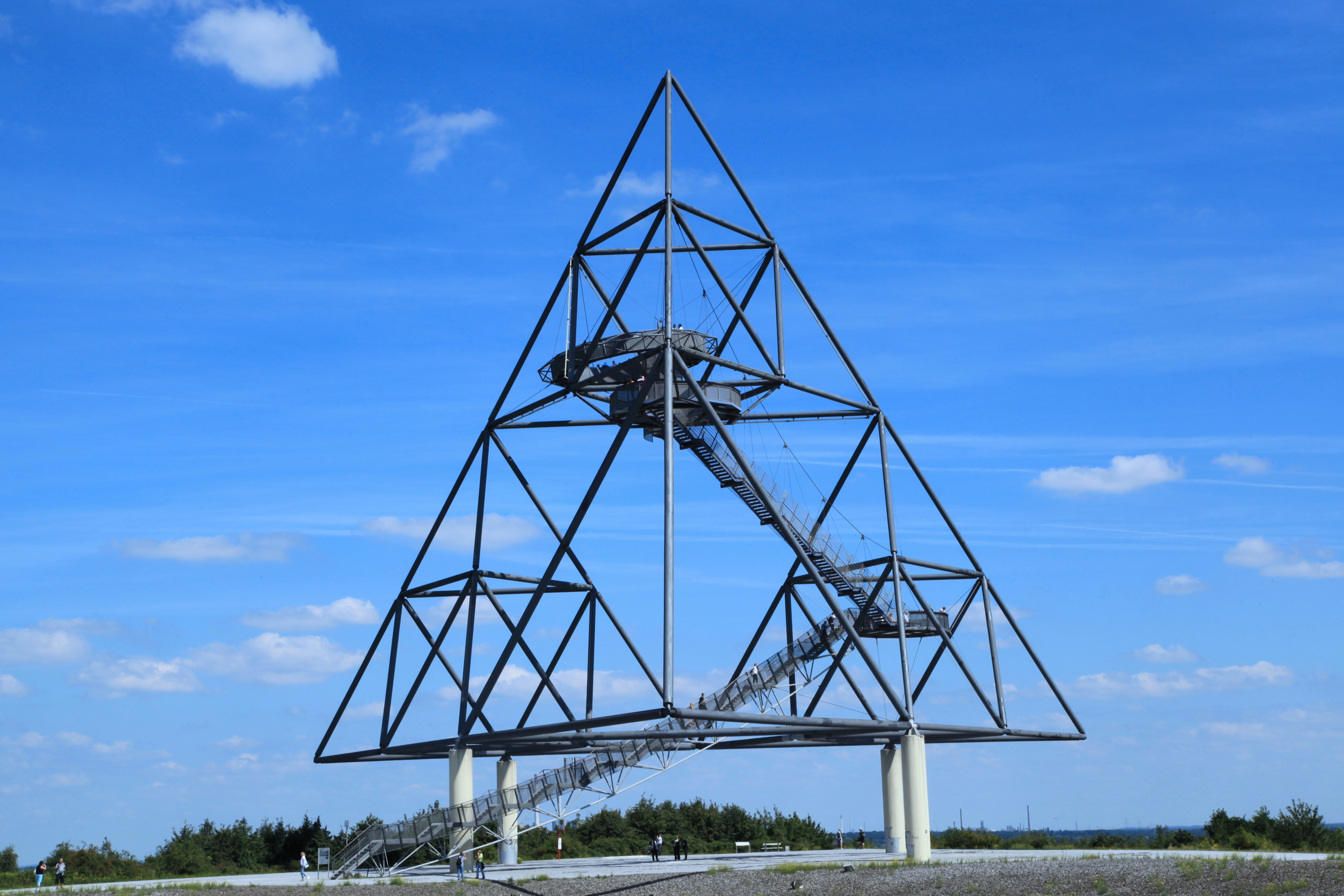

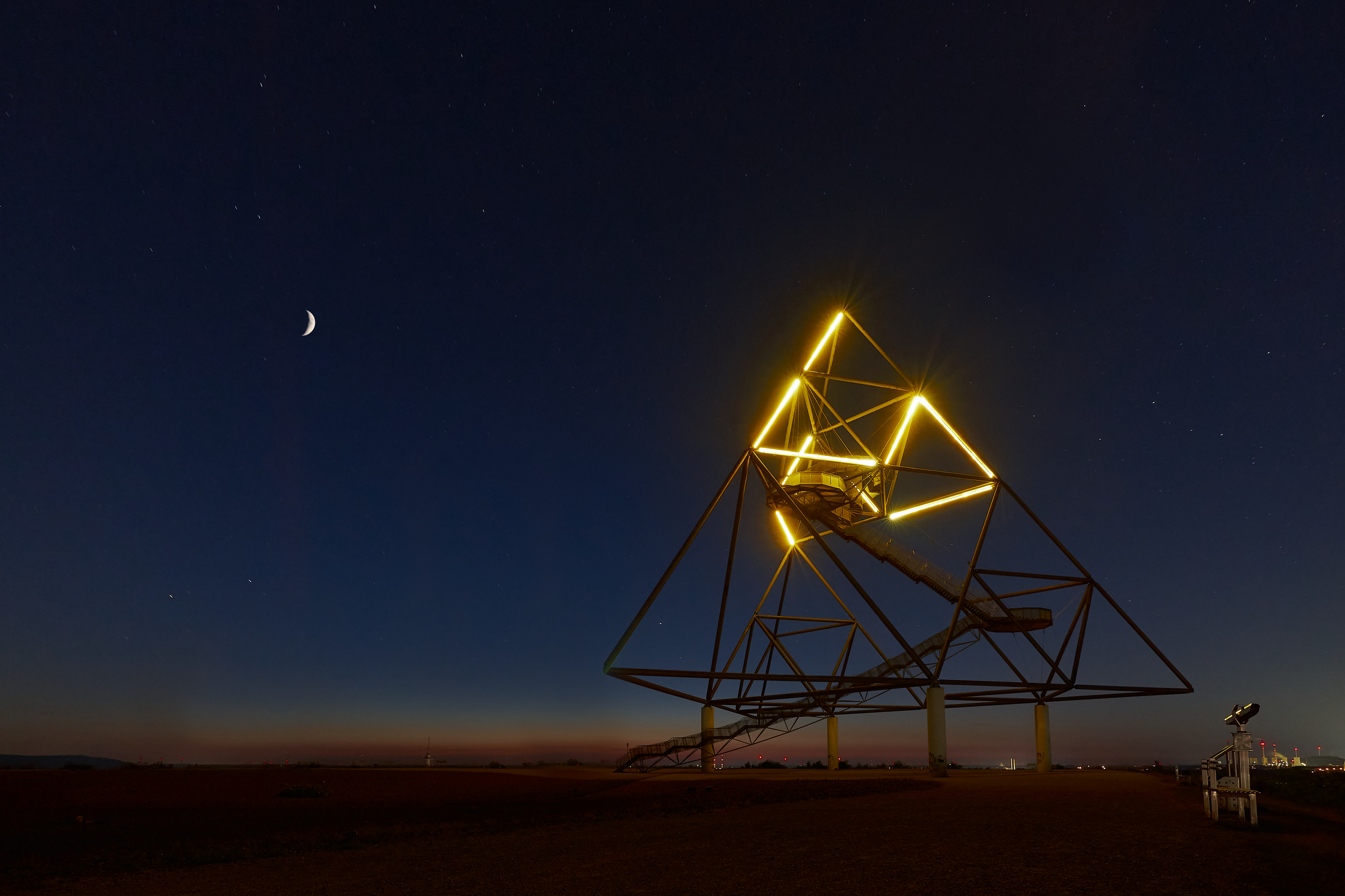
Tetrahedron at night with the light installation "Fraktal"

The lookout point, which acts as a landmark for the IBA Emscher Park, was designed by architect Wolfgang Christ from Darmstadt in collaboration with structural engineer Klaus Bollinger (Bollinger + Grohmann, Frankfurt). Construction was carried out by Rüter GmbH from Dortmund, and the Emscherblick slag heap event was officially opened on the Day of German Unity in 1995.

The construction of the viewpoint consists of a total of 210 tonnes of steel and tubes with an impressive total length of 1500 metres. It rests on four reinforced concrete columns, which sets it apart from the ground and gives the impression of floating, especially at night when the tetrahedron is illuminated. At the top of the tetrahedron, the Düsseldorf artist Jürgen LIT Fischer designed the impressive light sculpture called "Fractal".

The top of the slag heap was modelled as a lenticular depression according to a design by Wolfgang Christ, which means that the industrial and urban landscape of the northern Ruhr area is no longer visible from the centre of the depression.

Within the main structure are stairs and viewing platforms at different heights. The first platform at a height of 18 metres can be reached via a staircase designed as a suspension bridge. It continues steeply to the second platform at 32 metres. The third platform at a height of 38 metres consists of a ring with a diameter of 8 metres, which has an inclination of 8 degrees and can be reached via a spiral staircase.

The stairs and platforms are suspended movably in the structure on steel cables, which means that there can be slight fluctuations in strong winds. The platforms and stairs are made of translucent grids and perforated panels that allow a clear view downwards.

== "Aliens" stone arrangements ==
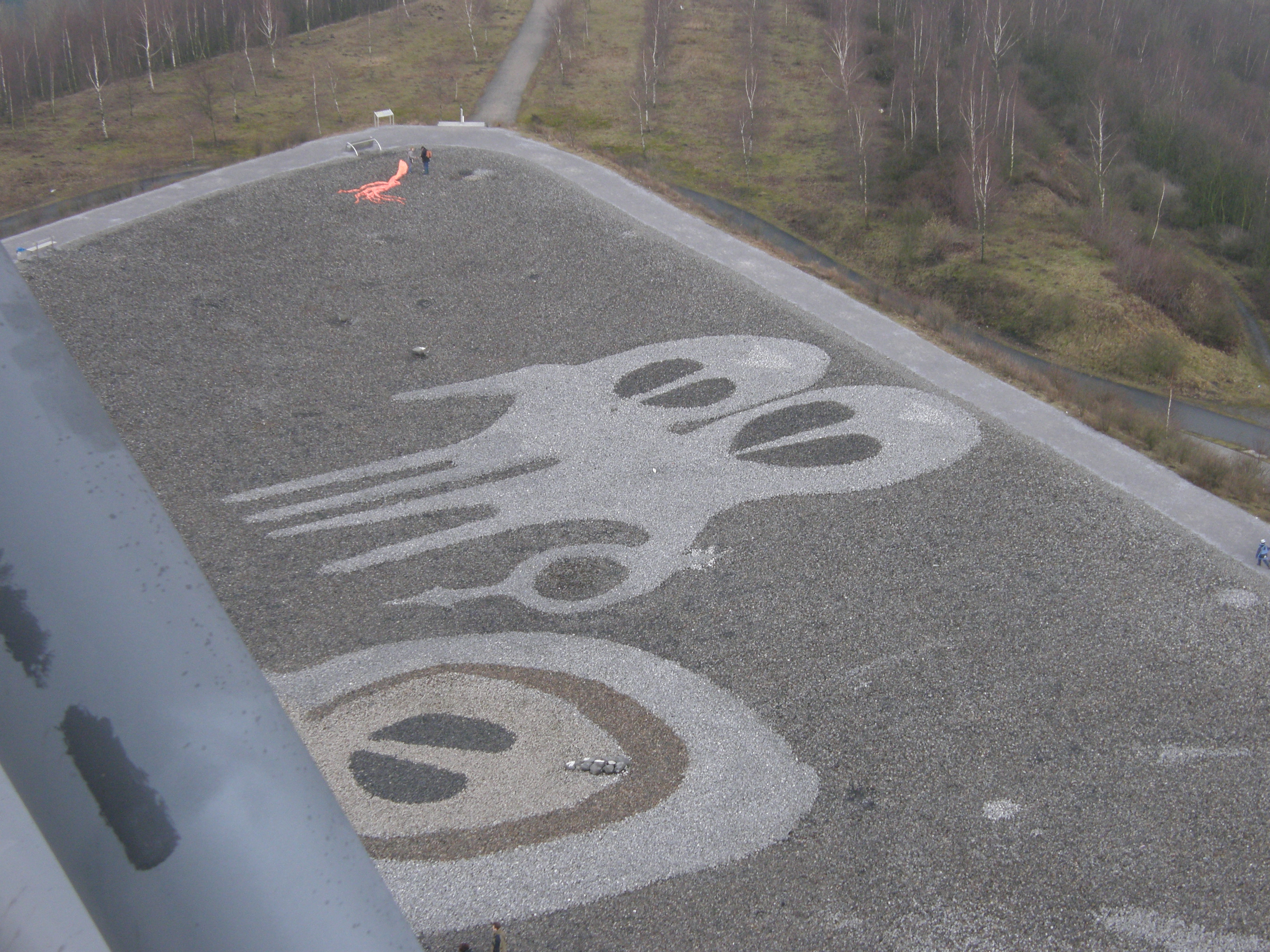
"Aliens"

The "Aliens" stone arrangement at the Bottrop Tetrahedron was created by Fred Fischer, a resident of Bottrop, from 2004 to early 2009. He arranged different coloured gravel stones to create several large stereotypical representations of "aliens" below the tetrahedron. This independent design was part of a series of activities in which other IBA Emscher Park landmarks, such as the Brockenscheidt slag heap of the Waltrop colliery with the track tower by artist Jan Bormann, were also redesigned by citizens.

In 2008, the Regionalverband Ruhr (RVR) requested an expert opinion because the citizens' unauthorised artistic activities, including the aliens on the Tetraeder, were not legally permitted. This situation led to a passionate debate in the media about the pros and cons of the unauthorised actions. As a consequence, the Regionalverband Ruhr had the "figures" dredged up and removed on 18 February 2009.

In August 2011, however, a revival of the aliens was made possible with the permission of the Ruhr Regional Association. This decision was based on an agreement between the artist Fred Fischer and the RVR. Originally, the RVR had promised to find another location for the art installation. When this did not succeed, they agreed to implement a temporary action with textile panels at the original site of the aliens.

This chequered history and the associated public discussions illustrate the influence and controversy that can arise from unauthorised artistic interventions in public spaces.
