= Marta Klonowska =

Polish glass maker

Marta Klonowska (born in 1964, Warsaw) is a Polish glass maker who is best known for her many animal sculptures. She often depicts animals with a relationship to historical figures or paintings, in natural poses using broken colored glass (cf. Lynx After a Sketchbook Page by Albrecht Durer). Her works have been shown are included in collections internationally, including London, Paris, Berlin, and a solo show in Japan.

== Biography ==
Marta was born in Warsaw, Poland where she began her craft as an artist, and now lives in Düsseldorf, Germany. She attended the Academy of Fine Arts in Wroclaw, Poland (1987–1989), where she studied with A.R. Penck. Glass quickly became her favorite artistic medium from which most of her art is created. Marta found inspiration for her work in paintings from great historical figures, in which their pets, mostly dogs, where depicted as a symbol of wealth and power.

== Career ==
Marta Klonowska attempts to "create installations which should lead the audience into a new universe.” The sense of a theatrical stage the animals and caregivers are presented in is an attempt to blend the realities together to make her audience think of the uncertainties of life.

Klonowska's work is included in the Alexander Tutsek-Stiftung Foundation, Munich; the Boca Raton Museum of Art, the Corning Museum of Glass, New York; the Gerisch Sculpture Park, Neumünster, DE; the Kunstsammlungen der Veste Coburg, Coburg, Germany; the Museum Kunstpalast, Düsseldorf; the Glasmuseum Hentrich, Düsseldorf; and the Musée-Atelier du Verre, Sars-Poteries.

Marta Klonowska has exhibited in galleries including several exhibitions (2005 to 2015) at the Lorch+Seidel Galerie in Berlin. She participated in the event Glasstress(2011, 2013), Venice, which traveled world-wide. Her work was part of the temporary exhibition Glassfever (2016), Dordrecht. A solo show "Marta Klonowska - Istota", was held at the Toyama Glass Art Museum in Toyama, Japan in 2019.

== Awards and honors ==
Marta Klonowska has been an Artist in Residence(1999) at the Cité International des Arts, Paris, and an Artist in Residence (2002) at the Akerby Skulpturpark. She was a finalist for the Bombay Sapphire Prize (2006), London.
