= Jens Schulte-Bockum =

German businessman (born 1966)

- Born: 1966 (age 59–60); Kirchhellen
- Occupation: Manager
- Known for: Former head of Vodafone Germany

Jens Schulte-Bockum (born November 20, 1966, in Kirchhellen) is a German manager. He is the former CEO of the German branch of Vodafone and since 2017 he has been Group COO of South African telecom multi-national MTN Group, Johannesburg.

== Life ==
Schulte-Bockum was born in Kirchhellen in Ruhr in 1966. He studied Liberal Arts at Emory University in Atlanta, US, and economics in Kiel, Germany, and completed his master's degree in economics at the University of Chicago in 1993. He was a research assistant at the Kiel Institute for the World Economy from 1989 to 1992.

From 1993, Schulte-Bockum worked for the management consultancy McKinsey, heading its Hamburg office from 2000. In 2003, he moved on to Vodafone, where he was initially global head of strategy at the UK site. He then oversaw their devices division from 2005. From 2008 to 2012, he was the CEO of Vodafone Netherlands, and in 2012 he was appointed COO and then CEO of Vodafone Germany. In this position, Schulte-Bockum had to introduce cost-cutting measures to withstand increased competition. Furthermore, he drove the expansion of the LTE network. In his time at Vodafone he oversaw the acquisition of MDAX-listed Kabel Deutschland Holding AG, for which he became chairman of the supervisory board.

In 2015, Vodafone announced that Schulte-Bockum had stepped down. Since 2017, Schulte-Bockum has been Group COO of South African telecommunications company MTN Group. He has served on the supervisory board of Lagos-listed MTN Nigeria Plc since 2017.

Schulte-Bockum was a member of the presidium of the BDI (Federation of German Industries) from 2012 to 2015.
