= Susanne Themlitz =

Portuguese artist

- Born: 1968 (age 57–58); Lisbon, Portugal
- Known for: Installation
- Website: https://www.susannethemlitz.net/

Susanne S. D. Themlitz (born 1968) is an installation artist who has Portuguese and German nationality. She has exhibited widely in Portugal, Germany and Spain.

== Early life and education ==
Susanne S.D. Themlitz was born in Lisbon, Portugal in 1968. She studied drawing and sculpture at the Centre for Art and Visual Communication (AR.CO) in Lisbon, between 1987 and 1993, with one of those years spent at the Royal College of Art in London. She obtained a master's degree in Fine Arts at the Kunstakademie Düsseldorf in Germany in 1995, on a Calouste Gulbenkian Foundation fellowship.

== Career ==
Susanne S. D. Themlitz lives and works between Lisbon, Portugal and Cologne, Germany. She exhibited for the first time in 1992 at the Calouste Gulbenkian Museum, in Lisbon. Since then, she has had solo exhibitions in Lisbon, Porto, Elvas, Tavira, Ponte de Sor, Sines and Caldas da Rainha in Portugal; Cologne, Berlin, and Meerbusch in Germany; Paris and Lyon in France; and Madrid, Badajoz, Santander, Las Palmas, and Cáceres, in Spain.

The work of Themlitz involves installations that create fantasy by using different media and materials, either individually or combined. She uses drawing, sculpture, photography, video, installation, and painting. Her work makes reference to literature and cinema, children's stories, mythology, and science fiction, combined with her observations on human beings and their personalities.

Her art is included in several collections. In addition to that of the Gulbenkian Foundation, these include those of the Caixa Geral de Depósitos, the Serralves Foundation, the Museum of Contemporary Art of Elvas and the Museum of Contemporary Art of Funchal, among others in Portugal, and in foreign collections such as the Museo Extremeño e Iberoamericano de Arte Contemporáneo in Badajoz and the Museo de Arte Moderno y Contemporáneo de Santander y Cantabria in Santander.

== Exhibitions ==
Solo shows include: Poemas, Galeria Ángeles Baños (Badajoz, 2023); Dentro, Galeria Vera Cortês (Lisbon, 2022); Transformatório. Themlitz & Companhia, Arquipélago Centro de Artes Contemporâneas (São Miguel – Azores, 2022); Galeria Alex Serra (Colónia, 2022); A Marble on the Floor In the Middle of the Room, Casa da Cerca (Almada, 2021/22); Monument Moment, Porta 14 (Lisbon, 2021); Far Away. Unveiled. To the Wind., Sismógrafo (Oporto, 2020); The Still Life of Landscape, Matjö Raum für Kunst (Cologne, 2019); El silencio cerca de la línea, Ángeles Baños Gallery (Badajoz, 2019); Three Lines, a Corner Times Four. And a Landscape., Galeria Vera Cortês (Lisbon, 2018); Breath. Pause – Between Two Points, Galeria Vera Cortês (Lisbon, 2016); Le loir est rendormi, Houg Gallery (Paris, 2015).

Group shows include: Fundação Calouste Gulbenkian (Lisboa, 2023, 2021, 2016, 2012, 2004); Atelier-Museu Júlio Pomar (Lisboa, 2023); MNAC (Lisboa, 2023); Fundação PLMJ (Lisboa, 2023); Culturgest (Lisboa, 2021, 2013, 2003, 2000); Arpad Szenes/Vieira da Silva Museum (Lisbon, 2021, 2019, 2013, 2002); CAAB (Beja, 2021); MEIAC Museum (Badajoz, 2021); Museum Nadir Afonso (Chaves, 2020); Frank Schlag Gallery (Essen, 2020); Kunsthalle (Düsseldorf, 2019); Kulturbahnhof (Eller, 2019); Casa da Cerca (Almada, 2019); Eugénio de Almeida Foundation (Évora, 2019); The Kreeger Museum (Washington, 2018); Carreau du Temple (Paris, 2018); Oriente Museum (Lisbon, 2017); -Galerina Steiner (Berlin, 2016); Rompone Kunstsalon (Cologne, 2016); -Arquipélago Museum (S. Miguel/Azores, 2015); Art Museum (Huelva, 2015); -MAC (Elvas, 2014); Martina Kaiser Gallery (2013, Cologne); -Hans-Peter-Zimmer Foundation (Düsseldorf, 2012); -Cultural Center Belém (Lisbon, 2010, 2009, 2007); Pátio Herreriano Museum (Valladolid, 2008); MACUF (A Coruña, 2008).

== Institutional collections ==
Institutional collections include: Amadeo de Souza-Cardoso Museum, António Cachola Collection, Bordallo Pinheiro Museum, CACE, Caixa Geral de Depósitos/Culturgest, Calouste Gulbenkian Foundation, Carmona e Costa Foundation, Centenera Foundation, EDP Foundation, Figueiredo Ribeiro Collection, FLAD Foundation, Lisbon City Council, MEIAC Badajoz, Museum MAS Santander, Norlinda & José Lima Collection, PLMJ Foundation, Serralves Foundation and Jorge Pérez Collection.
