= Michael Gerdes =

German politician (born 1960)

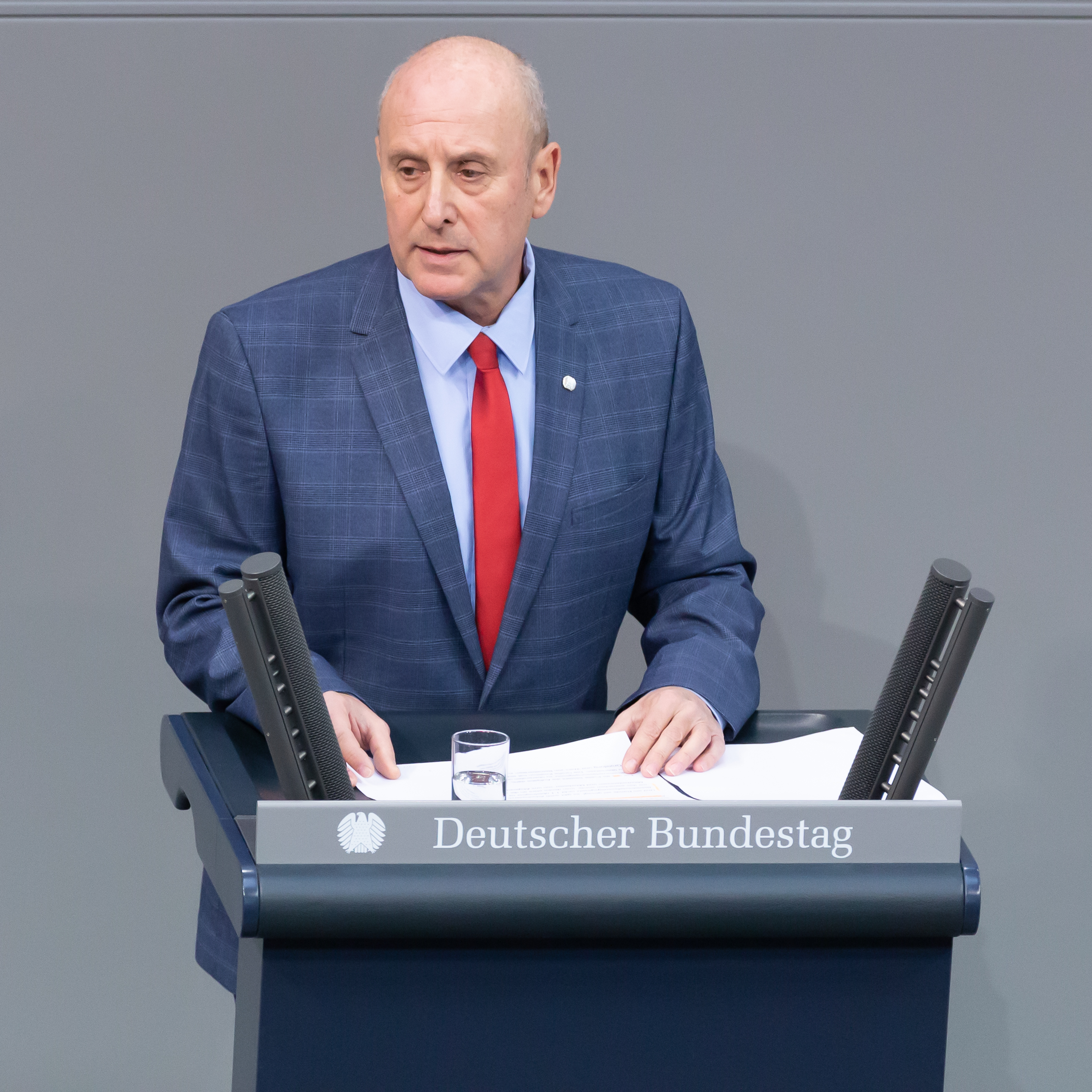
- Michael Gerdes in 2020

Member of the Bundestag
- In office 2009–2025

Personal details
- Born: 23 May 1960 (age 65) Bottrop, West Germany (now Germany)
- Party: SPD

Michael Gerdes (born 23 May 1960) is a German politician of the Social Democratic Party (SPD) who served as a member of the Bundestag from the state of North Rhine-Westphalia from 2009 to 2025.

== Political career ==
Gerdes joined the SPD in 1976 and later became a board member of the local SPD branch in Boverheide. He has been a member of the Bottrop city council since 1994. There he became deputy chairman of his parliamentary group and chairman of the sports and pools committee. He is also a member of the regional council of the Münster administrative district. Until 2017 he was also sub-district chairman of the SPD Bottrop.

=== Member of the German Parliament, 2009–2025 ===
Gerdes first became a member of the Bundestag after the 2009 German federal election. From 2009 he was a directly elected member of the Bundestag for constituency 125 (Bottrop, Gladbeck and Dorsten) and was re-elected to the Bundestag in 2013, 2017 and 2021.

In parliament, Gerdes served as a member of the Committee for Labour and Social Affairs.

In early 2024, Gerdes announced that he would not stand in the 2025 federal elections but instead resign from active politics by the end of the parliamentary term.
