= Bottrop =

- City
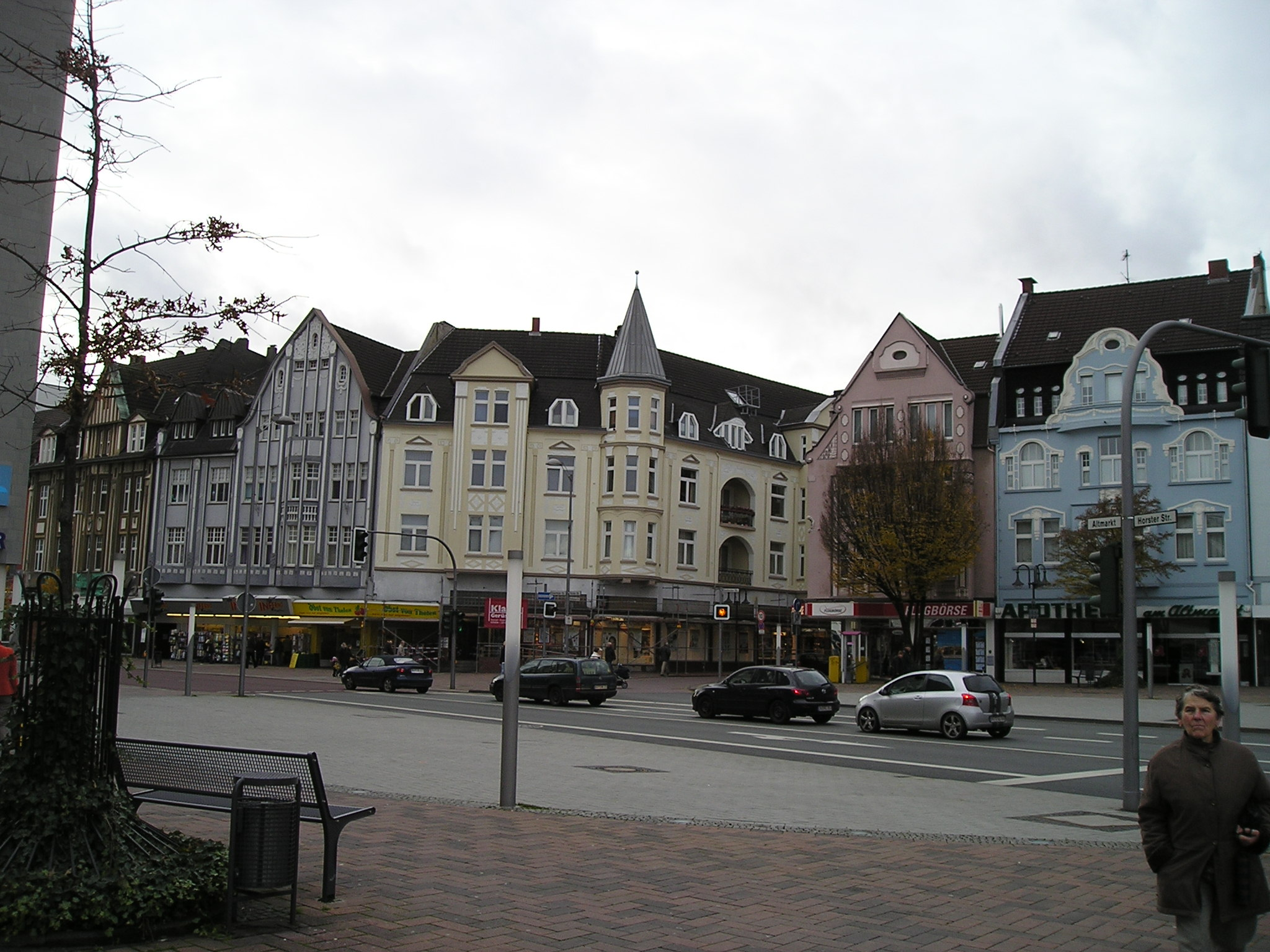
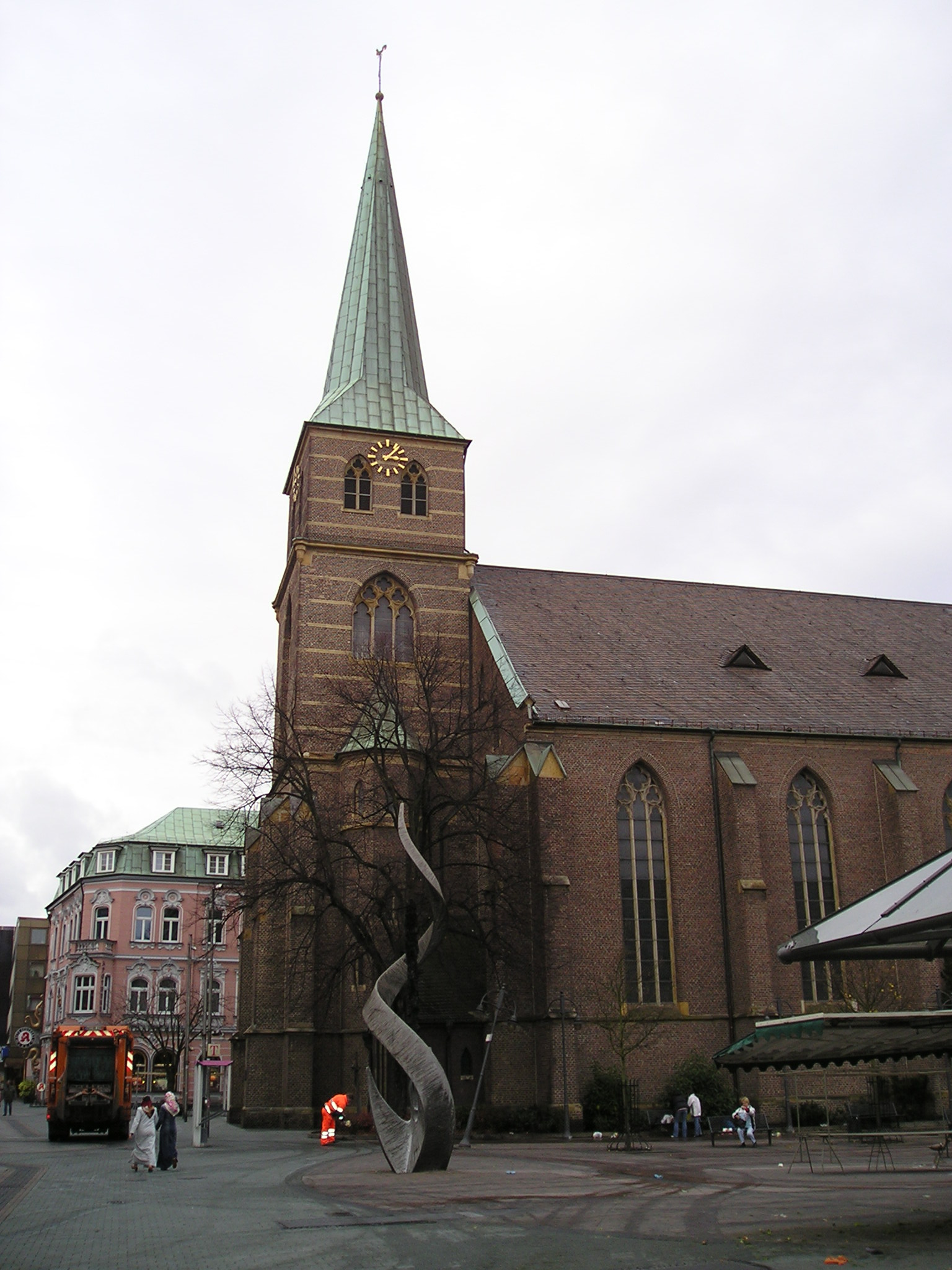
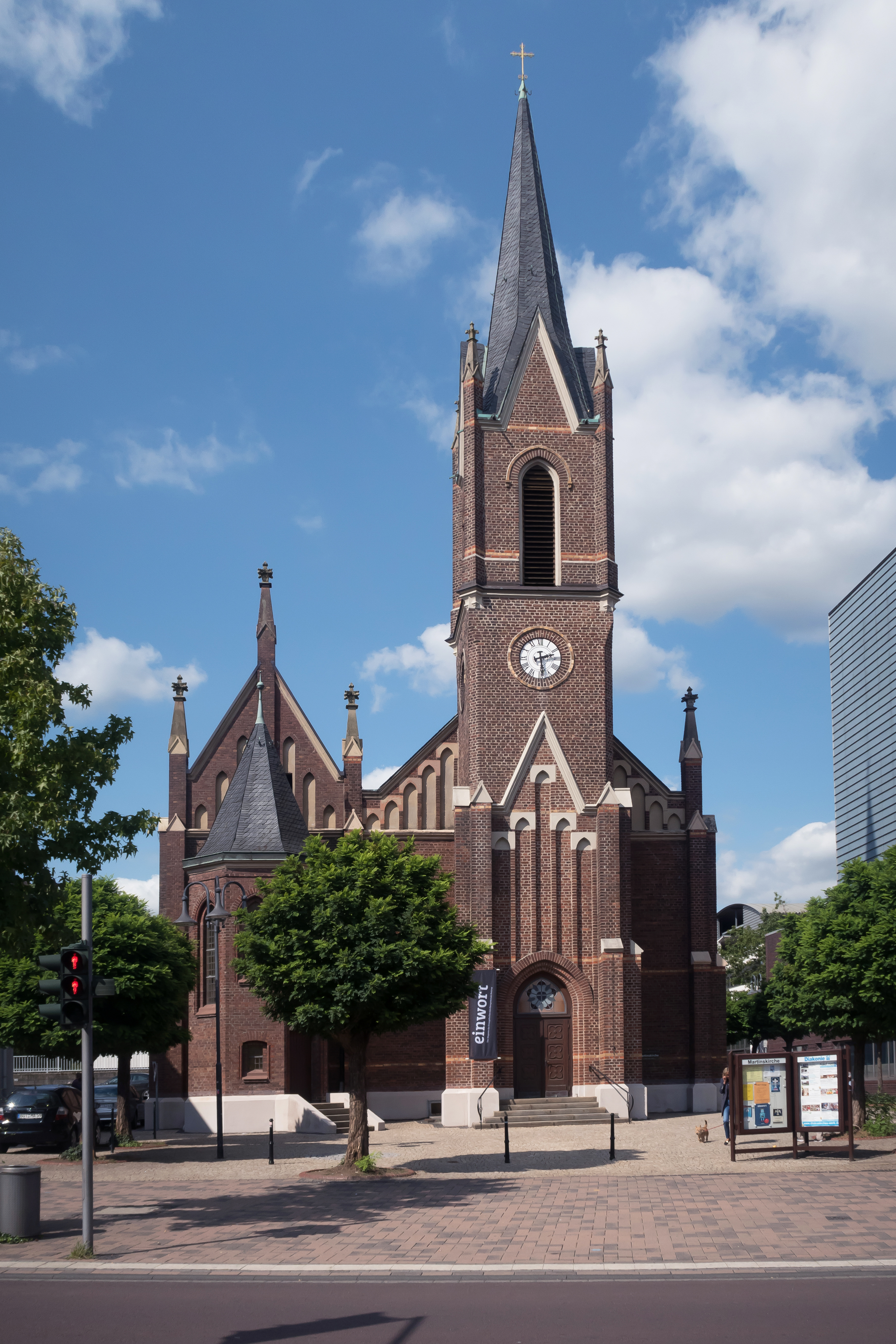
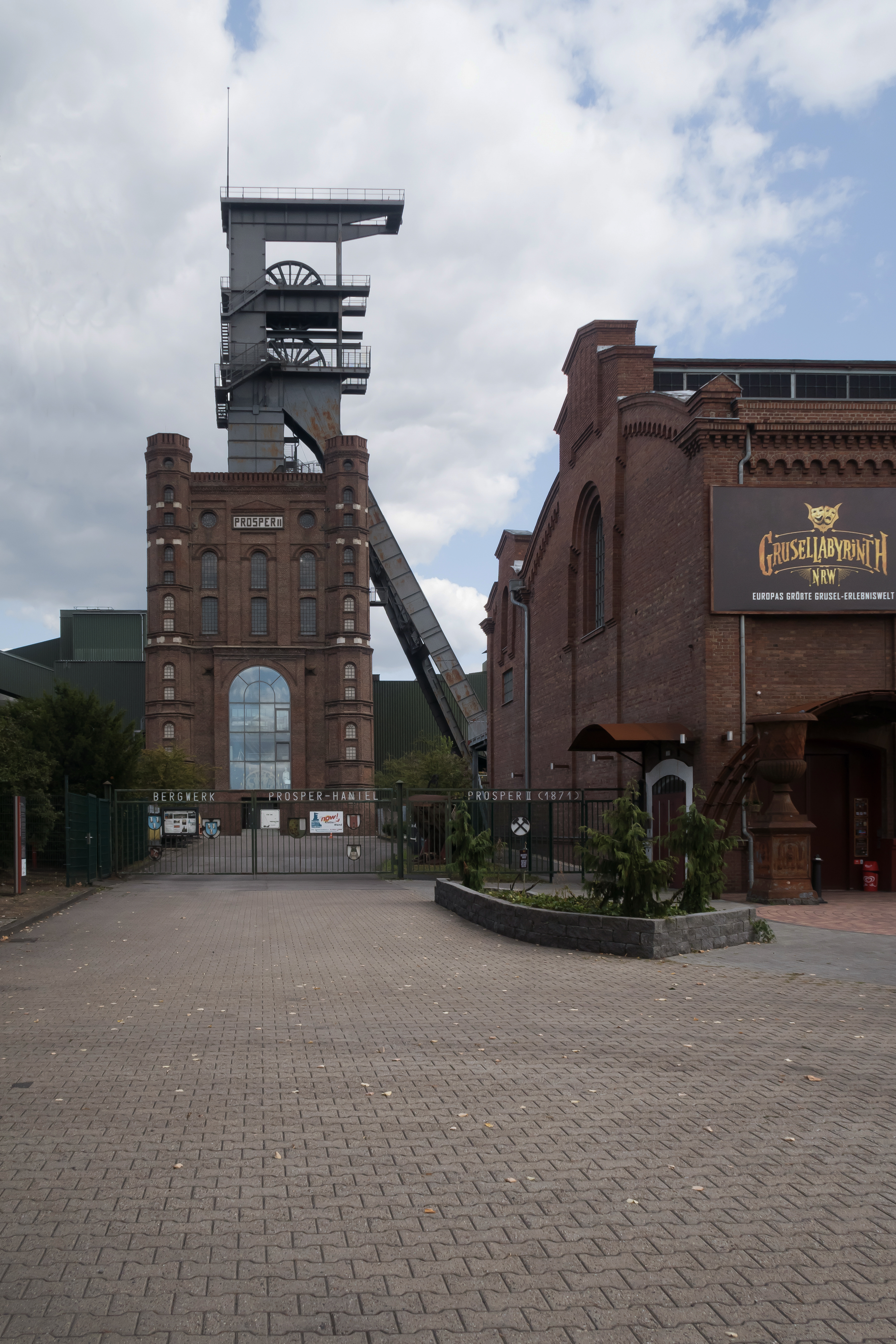
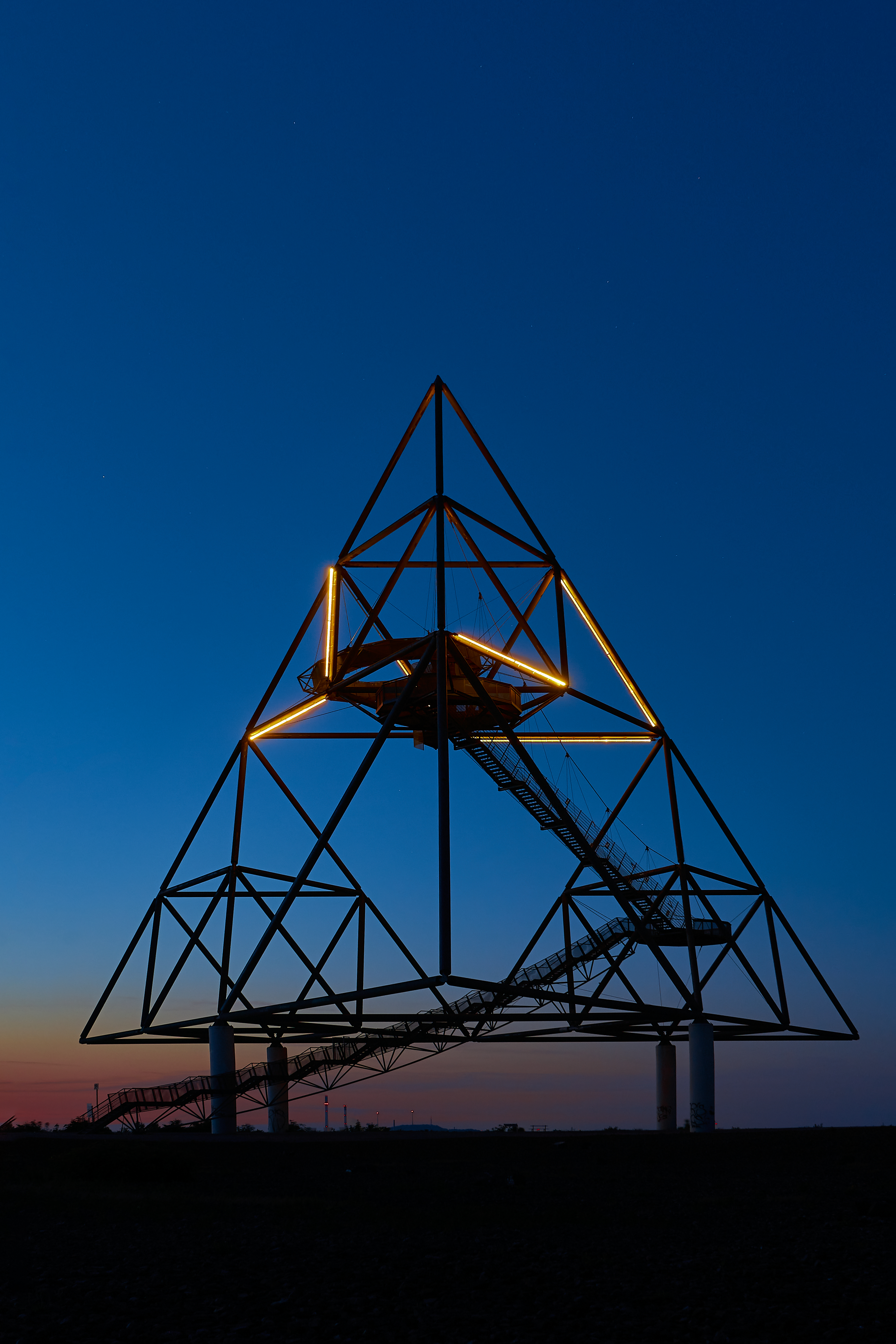
- Altmarkt St. Cyriacus's Church St. Martin's Church Coal mine Prosper 2 Tetrahedron landmark

- Flag
- Interactive map of Bottrop
- Location within Germany Location within North Rhine-Westphalia
- Coordinates: 51°31′29″N 06°55′22″E
- Country: Germany
- State: North Rhine-Westphalia
- Admin. region: Münster
- District: Urban district

Government
  - Mayor (2025–30): Matthias Buschfeld (SPD)
  - Governing parties: SPD/ CDU

Area
  - Total: 100.7 km^{2} (38.9 sq mi)
- Elevation: 60 m (200 ft)

Population (2025-12-31)
  - Total: 118,482
  - Density: 1,177/km^{2} (3,047/sq mi)
- Time zone: UTC+01:00 (CET)
  - Summer (DST): UTC+02:00 (CEST)
- Postal codes: 46236–46244
- Dialling codes: 02041, 02045
- Vehicle registration: BOT
- Website: www.bottrop.de

Bottrop (German: [ˈbɔtʁɔp]) is a city in west-central Germany, on the Rhine–Herne Canal, in North Rhine-Westphalia. Located in the Ruhr industrial area, Bottrop adjoins Essen, Oberhausen, Gladbeck, and Dorsten. The city had been a coal-mining and rail center and contains factories producing coal-tar derivatives, chemicals, textiles, and machinery. Bottrop grew as a mining center beginning in the 1860s, was chartered as a city in 1921, and bombed during the Oil Campaign of World War II. In 1975, it unified with the neighbouring communities of Gladbeck and Kirchhellen, but Gladbeck left it in 1976, leading to Kirchhellen becoming a district of Bottrop as Bottrop-Kirchhellen. It is also twinned with Blackpool, England.

== Boroughs ==
The total area of the municipal territory is about 101 km^{2} (39 sq mi). The longest north-south distance is 17 km (11 mi), and from west to east 9 km (5.6 mi). The highest peak within the city's territory is 78 m (256 ft), the lowest one being 26 m (85 ft) above sea level.

Bottrop is divided into three boroughs: Bottrop-Mitte (Bottrop-Center), Bottrop-Süd (Bottrop South) and Bottrop-Kirchhellen, each having a borough representation and a borough ruler.

These boroughs are further subdivided into city parts, partly named after their traditional names, while the newly built parts are only recently named:

- Bottrop-Mitte: Eigen, Fuhlenbrock, Stadtmitte, and Marktviertel
- Bottrop-Süd: Batenbrock, Boy, Ebel, Lehmkuhle, Vonderort, Gartenstadt Welheim (Garden city Welheim), and Welheimer Mark
- Bottrop-Kirchhellen: Ekel, Feldhausen, Grafenwald, Hardinghausen, Holthausen, Im Loh, Kirchhellen, Kuhberg, and Overhagen

For statistical reasons, Bottrop is also divided into statistical boroughs. They are (with their official numbering):

- 11 Altstadt
- 12 Nord-Ost (Northeast)
- 13 Süd-West (Southwest)
- 21 Fuhlenbrock-Heide (Fuhlenbrock-Heath)
- 22 Fuhlenbrock-Wald (Fuhlenbrock-Forest)
- 31 Stadtwald (City forest)
- 32 Eigen
- 41 Batenbrock-Nord (Batenbrock-North)
- 42 Batenbrock-Süd (Batenbrock-South)
- 51 Boy
- 52 Welheim
- 61 Ebel/Welheimer Mark (Ebel-Welheim Market)
- 62 Süd (South)
- 71 Kirchhellen-Mitte (Kirchhellen-Center)
- 72 Kirchhellen-Süd/Grafenwald (Kirchhellen-South/Grafenwald)
- 73 Kirchhellen-Süd-West (Kirchhellen-Southwest)
- 74 Kirchhellen-Nord-Ost (Kirchhellen-Northeast)

=== Kirchhellen ===
From 1919 until 1976, Kirchhellen was its own town. Following a communal reorganization reform in 1975, both Kirchhellen and Gladbeck joined the city of Bottrop. This resulted in the nickname "GlaBotKi". Gladbeck left the city in 1976, and became part of the district of Recklinghausen.

Most of Kirchhellen is Catholic (around 65%). It has three churches, including one Lutheran church.

== Population ==
Historical population

Year	Pop.	±% p.a.
1965	122,386	—
1970	118,533	−0.64%
1975	116,489	−0.35%
1980	114,587	−0.33%
1985	112,503	−0.37%
1990	118,936	+1.12%
1995	120,642	+0.29%

Year	Pop.	±% p.a.
2000	120,611	−0.01%
2005	119,356	−0.21%
2010	116,771	−0.44%
2015	117,143	+0.06%
2020	117,388	+0.04%
2025	118,482	+0.19%

Source: Landesdatabank Nordrhein-Westfalen

== Politics ==
=== Mayor ===
The current mayor of Bottrop is Matthias Buschfeld of the Social Democratic Party (SPD) since 2025. The most recent mayoral election was held on 14 September 2025, and the results were as follows:

Candidate	Party	Votes	%
Matthias Buschfeld	Social Democratic Party	19,101	38.5
Frank Kien	Christian Democratic Union of Germany	12,104	24.6
Markus Mellerke	Alternative for Germany	10,829	21.8
Nick Nowara	BEWEGT	5,336	10.8
Sven Hermens	The Left	2,138	4.3
Valid votes		49,598	99.1
Invalid votes		438	0.9
Total		50,036	55.8
Electorate/voter turnout		89,679	100.0
Source: State Returning Officer

=== City council ===
Results of the 2020 city council election.

The Bottrop city council governs the city alongside the mayor. The most recent city council election was held on 13 September 2020, and the results were as follows:

Party	Votes	%	±	Seats	±
Social Democratic Party (SPD)	17,668	40.2	▼7.4	24	▼2
Christian Democratic Union (CDU)	10,513	23.9	▼3.2	14	▼1
Alliance 90/The Greens (Grüne)	5,639	12.8	▲7.4	8	▲5
Alternative for Germany (AfD)	3,076	7.0	▲5.2	4	▲3
Ecological Democratic Party (ÖDP)	1,856	4.2	▼0.4	2	▼1
German Communist Party (DKP)	1,832	4.2	▲0.2	2	±0
Free Democratic Party (FDP)	1,821	4.1	▲1.5	2	▲1
The Left (Die Linke)	1,507	3.4	▼0.7	2	±0
Valid votes	43,912	98.5			
Invalid votes	672	1.5			
Total	44,584	100.0		58	▲4
Electorate/voter turnout	92,241	48.3	▼0.2		
Source: State Returning Officer

== Culture and attractions ==
=== Theaters, museums, and buildings ===
- Main Post Office, constructed 1921-1923
- The Quadrat is a museum housing permanent exhibitis on local history and displaying works by Josef Albers and many temporary exhibitions.
- City Hall (Neo-Renaissance 1910–1916) is regarded as the emblem of the city.
- Schloss Beck theme park and castle (late baroque period 1766–1777)
- Villa Dickmann, constructed 1901–1903 (art nouveau)
- Alte Apotheke (Old Pharmacy, Wilhelminian style 1895)
- Catholic churches
  - Heilige Familie
  - Heilig Kreuz, built 1955–57, windows by Georg Meistermann
  - Herz Jesu, built 1929
  - Liebfrauen
  - St. Antonius
  - St. Barbara
  - St. Bonifatius
  - St. Cyriakus, Propstei, built 1861/62 by Emil von Manger
  - St. Elisabeth, built 1954
  - St. Franziskus
  - St. Johannes Baptist (BOT-Boy)
  - St. Johannes der Täufer (BOT-Kirchhellen)
  - St. Joseph
  - St. Ludger
  - St. Mariä Himmelfahrt
  - St. Matthias
  - St. Michael
  - St. Paul
  - St. Peter
  - St. Pius
  - St. Suitbert, built 1955
- Protestant churches
  - Auferstehungskirche
  - Friedenskirche
  - Gnadenkirche
  - Martin-Niemöller-Kirche
  - Martinskirche, erbaut 1884
  - Paul-Gerhardt-Kirche
  - Pauluskirche
- Malakow-Turm (1872) of the coal mine Prosper II
- Coal Mining Tip Haniel with an open-air theater (Amphitheater) and the Stations of the Cross designed by Tisa von der Schulenburg and Adolf Radecki and opened in 1995.
- Saalbau, convention center

=== Attractions ===
- Alpincenter - the world's longest indoor ski slope
- Tetraeder is a 50-m-tall walkable steel tetrahedron, placed on a 90-m slag heap. It has been the town's landmark since its construction in 1995.
- Movie Park Germany - theme park (in Bottrop-Kirchhellen)
- Schloss Beck is a castle turned into an amusement park (in Bottrop-Kirchhellen).
- Indoor Skydiving Bottrop, a powerful vertical wind tunnel, attracts skydivers from all over Europe.
- Since September 12, 2005, so called Stolpersteine have been placed by artist Gunter Demnig all over the city in remembrance of the people deported and killed by the Nazis.

=== Periodic events ===
- January: Festival Orgel PLUS (music festival started in 1989)
- February: Rose Monday Parade and Carnival
- May: Horse Market
- May: Asparagus - Farmers' Market in Kirchhellen
- Brezelfest (Pretzel Festival) in Kirchhellen
- May/June/July: Schützenfeste (marksmen festivals) of Bottrops marksmen companies (BSV Bottrop Batenbrock, BSV Bottrop Eigen, BSV Bottrop Fuhlenbrock, BSV Bottrop Vonderort, BSV Andreas Hofer, Alte Allgemeine Bürgerschützengesellschaft, BSV Bottrop Boy)
- September: Michaelismarket

== Religion ==
- Catholic: 50% (19 churches)
- Protestant (Lutheran): 20% (8 churches)
- Atheist/agnostic: 20%
- Muslim: 2%

== Notable people ==
- Josef Albers (1888–1976), painter, graphic artist, designer, art teacher
- August Everding (1928–1999), opera director and administrator
- Diethard Zils (born 1935), priest and hymnwriter
- Bernhard Korte (1938–2025), mathematician and computer scientist
- Renate Thyssen-Henne (born 1939), entrepreneur
- Claus Spahn (born 1940), journalist and author
- Werner Münch (born 1940), politician (CDU), prime minister of Saxony-Anhalt (1991–1993)
- Werner Biskup (1942–2014), football player and manager
- Dieter Renz (1943–1969), amateur boxer and Olympic games participant
- Hans Georg Bock (born 1948), mathematician and computer scientist
- Theo Jörgensmann (1948–2025), jazz clarinetist and composer
- Paul Holz (1952–2017), footballer
- Martin Honert (born 1953), artist, professor at the Dresden Academy of Fine Arts
- Manfred Dubski (born 1954), retired footballer
- Michael Gerdes (born 1960), politician
- Gisela Kinzel (born 1961), athlete and Olympic games participant
- Ulla Kock am Brink (born 1961), television presenter
- Andrea C. Hoffer (born 1964), painter
- Thomas Loose (born 1964), canoeist
- Sabine Gaudzinski-Windheuser (born 1965), archaeologist
- Christian Scheuß (born 1966), journalist and writer
- Jens Schulte-Bockum (born 1966), manager
- Da Hool (born 1968), DJ and music producer
- David Schraven (born 1970), journalist
- Stefanie Horn (born 1991), canoeist
- Maurice Multhaup (born 1996), footballer
- Felix Passlack (born 1998), footballer
- Miray Cin (born 2001), German-Turkish football player, represents Turkey at international level

== Twin towns – sister cities ==
Bottrop is twinned with:

- Blackpool, England, United Kingdom (1980)
- Gliwice, Poland (2007)
- Merseburg, Germany (1989)
- Mitte (Berlin), Germany (1983)
- Tourcoing, France (1967)
- Veszprém, Hungary (1987)
- Nobeoka, Miyazaki, Japan
