= Bundesautobahn 46 =

Federal motorway in Germany

A 46
- Bundesautobahn 46
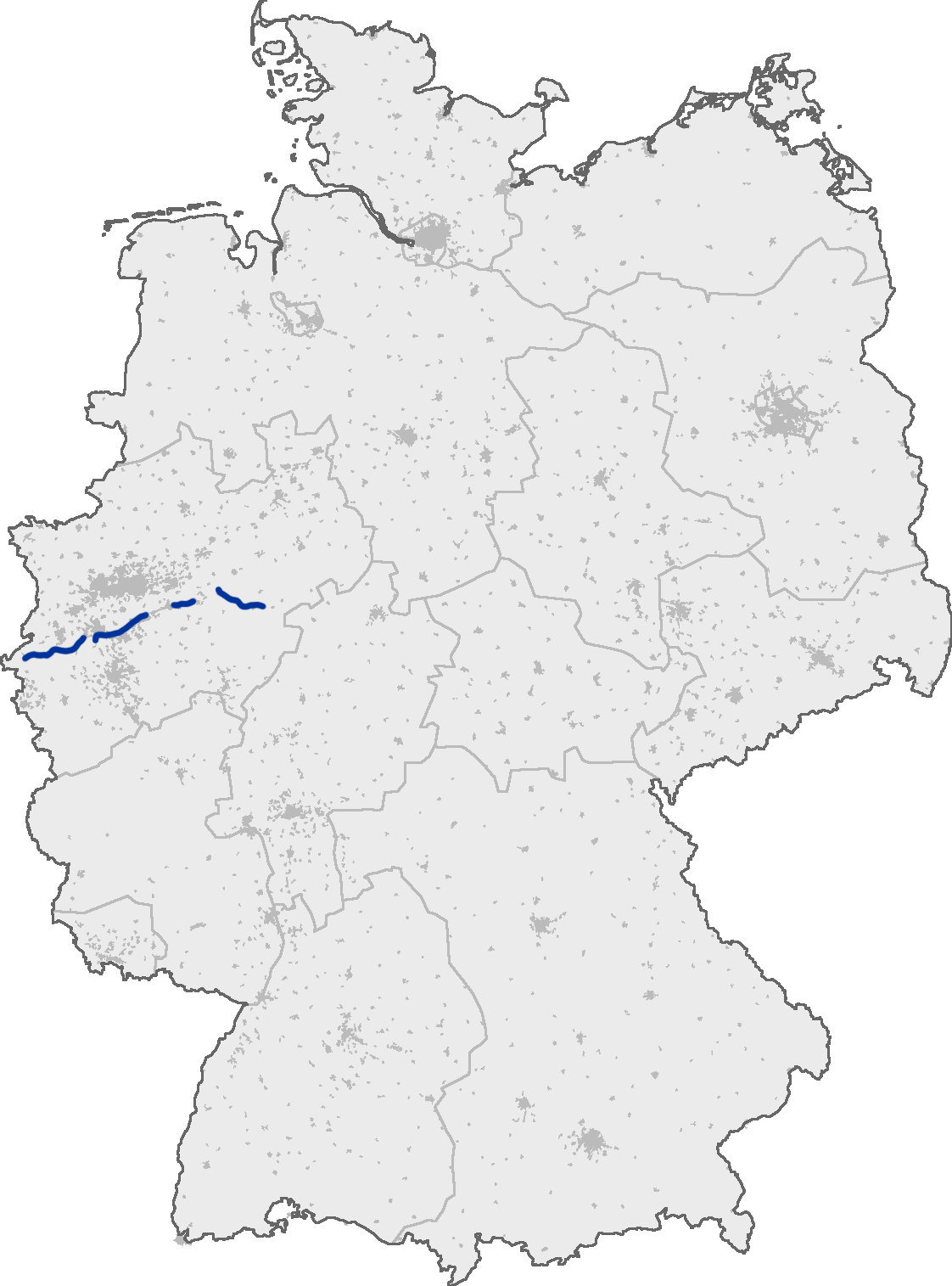

Route information
- Length: 133 km (83 mi)

Location
- Country: Germany
- States: North Rhine-Westphalia

Highway system
- Roads in Germany; Autobahns; List; Federal; List; State; E-roads
← A 45	→ A 48

Bundesautobahn 46 (translates from German as Federal Motorway 46, short form Autobahn 46, abbreviated as BAB 46 or A 46) is an Autobahn in Germany. It is noncontiguous and split in several parts in the state of North Rhine-Westphalia, an extension to Kassel in Hesse was planned but has been abandoned.

== Exit list ==
This is the major exit lists in A 46.

Legend:

- I/C - Interchange, I/S - Intersection, RSA - Rest and service area, OBR - Overhead bridge restaurant, R/R - Restaurant and rest plaza, L/B - Layby, V/P - Vista point, TN - tunnel, T/P - Toll plaza, BR - Bridge
- C - Cloverleaf, S - Stack, T-A - Trumpet-A, T-B - Trumpet-B, DT - Directional-T/Y, SDT - Semi-Directional-T/Y, P-Y - Partial-Y, D - Diamond, P-C - Partial cloverleaf, D-D - Diverging diamond, D-R - Direct ramp

km	Exit	Name
Germany–Netherlands border Through to N 297
	(-)	Nederland border crossing
		Tüddern L228
		Geilenkirchen L410
		Gangelt
		Waldenrath
B 56n
End of the motorway		End of the motorway
	(4)	Heinsberg B 221
	(5)	Dremmen
		Rurbrücke
	(6)	Hückelhoven-West
	(7)	Hückelhoven-Ost
	(8)	Erkelenz-Süd
	(9)	Erkelenz-Ost
	(10)	MG-Wanlo 4-way interchange A 61
	(11)	Holz 3-way interchange A 44
	(12)	Jüchen A 540 B 59
	(13)	Grevenbroich
		Services Vierwinden
	(14)	Grevenbroich-Kapellen
	(15)	Neuss-Holzheim B 1 B 230
----
	(21)	Neuss-Süd 4-way interchange A 57
	(22)	Neuss-Uedesheim
		Fleher Brücke 1.165 m
	(23)	Düsseldorf-Bilk
		Universitätstunnel 1026 m
	(24)	Düsseldorf-Wersten
		Tunnel Wersten 869 m / 860 m
	(25)	Düsseldorf-Holthausen
	(26)	Düsseldorf-Süd 3-way interchange A 59
	(27)	Erkrath
	(28)	Kreuz Hilden 4-way interchange A 3
	(29)	Haan-West
	(30)	Haan-Ost
	(31)	Sonnborner Kreuz A 535
	(32)	Wuppertal-Varresbeck
	(33)	Wuppertal-Katernberg
		Einhausung Hansastraße facing eastward, 577 m
	(34)	Wuppertal-Elberfeld
	(35)	Wuppertal-Barmen
	(36)	Wuppertal-Wichlinghausen
		Services Wuppertal-Barmen
		Einhausung Sternenberg facing eastward, 626 m
	(37)	Wuppertal-Oberbarmen
	(38)	Wuppertal-Nord 4-way interchange A 1, A 43
----
	(42)	Hagen 4-way interchange A 45
		Lennebrücke ca. 500 m
	(43)	Hagen-Hohenlimburg
	(44)	Hagen-Elsey
	(45)	Iserlohn-Letmathe
	(46)	Iserlohn-Oestrich
	(47)	Iserlohn-Zentrum
	(48)	Iserlohn-Seilersee
	(49)	Hemer / auf Stadtgebiet Iserlohn B 7
		Tunnel Bemberg 300 m (planned)
		Tunnel Stübecken 1250 m (planned)
		Hemer-Edelburg (planned)
		Oesetalbrücke 750 m (planned)
		Menden / Lendringsen (planned) B 515
		Talbrücke Wimberbach 300 m (planned)
		Voßwinkel-West (planned) B 7
		Tunnel 400 m (planned)
		Voßwinkel-Ost (planned)
		Ruhrtalbrücke 1000 m (planned)
Intersection		3-way interchange Neheim (planned) A 445
A 445 Neheim
	(62)	Arnsberg-Neheim
	(63)	Arnsberg-Rathausplatz/Herdringen
	(64)	Arnsberg-Hüsten
		Talbrücke Rüggensiepen
		Talbrücke Kuhpfadsiepen ca. 200 m
		Talbrücke Wannebach ca. 500 m
	(65)	Arnsberg-Altstadt vormals Arnsberg-Niedereimer
		Talbrücke Berbke 299 m
		Talbrücke Wintrop ca. 300 m
	(66)	Arnsberg-Ost vormals Arnsberg-Uentrop
		Tunnel Uentrop 200 m
		Ruhrtalbrücke Rumbeck 577 m
		Talbrücke Hünenburg
		Talbrücke Deitmecke
	(67)	Meschede-Freienohl
		Talbrücke Steinwege ca. 600 m
		Talbrücke Rümmecke 379 m
		Hembergtunnel 400 m / 375 m
		Tunnel Olpe 510 m
		Ruhrtalbrücke Wennemen 414 m
	(68)	Meschede-Wennemen
		Talbrücke Wennemen ca. 500 m
		Talbrücke Fulmecke ca. 300 m
	(69)	Meschede-Enste
	(70)	Meschede
		Talbrücke Kohlwederbach ca. 500 m
		Talbrücke Berkey
		Talbrücke Eversberg ca. 300 m
		Talbrücke Gränscheid ca. 300 m
	(71)	Bestwig B 7
		Talbrücke Hamecke 505 m
		Rest area
		Talbrücke Nuttlar 665 m
	(72)	Olsberg B 480n
		Altenbüren (planned)
		Brilon (planned) B 480
		Brilon-Rixen (planned)
		Brilon-Scharfenberg (planned)
		Möhnetal (planned) B 480, B 516
