= Bundesautobahn 42 =

Federal motorway in Germany

A 42
- Bundesautobahn 42

Route information
- Length: 58 km (36 mi)

Major junctions
- West end: A 57/B 528 in Kamp-Lintfort
- East end: A 45 in Castrop-Rauxel

Location
- Country: Germany
- States: North Rhine-Westphalia

Highway system
- Roads in Germany; Autobahns; List; Federal; List; State; E-roads
← A 40	→ A 43

Bundesautobahn 42 (translates from German as Federal Motorway 42, short form Autobahn 42, abbreviated as BAB 42 or A 42) is an autobahn in western Germany. It connects Kamp-Lintfort with Castrop-Rauxel, linking several large cities in the Ruhr area, such as Dortmund, Duisburg, the North of Essen and Gelsenkirchen. It is colloquially known as Emscherschnellweg, after the river Emscher, which it roughly follows. Construction went underway in the 1970s and 1980s.

== Exit list ==
(1)	Kamp-Lintfort 4-way interchange A 57 E31 B 528
(2)	Moers-Nord
(3)	Duisburg-Baerl
	Beeckerwerther Brücke 1030 m
(4)	Duisburg-Beeckerwerth
(5)	Duisburg-Beeck
	Hochstraße 390 m
	Straßenbrücke 120 m
(5)	Duisburg-Beeck
	Bahnbrücke 60 m
	Hochstraße 320 m
(6)	Duisburg-Nord 4-way interchange A 59
(7)	Duisburg-Neumühl
(8)	Oberhausen-West 4-way interchange A 3 E34 E35
(9)	Oberhausen-Buschhausen
	Straßenbrücke 80 m
	Emscherbrücke 510 m
(10)	Oberhausen-Zentrum A 516 B 223
(11)	Oberhausen-Neue Mitte
(12)	Bottrop-Süd
	Emscherbrücke 430 m
	Rhein-Herne-Kanal 590 m
(13)	Essen-Nord B 224
(14)	Essen-Altenessen
(15)	Gelsenkirchen-Heßler
(16)	Gelsenkirchen-Zentrum
(17)	Gelsenkirchen-Schalke
(18)	Gelsenkirchen-Bismarck
	Hüller Bach 50 m
(19)	Herne-Wanne
	Straßenbrücke 50 m
(20)	Herne-Crange B 226
(21)	Kreuz Herne 4-way interchange A 43
(22)	Herne-Baukau
(23)	Herne-Horsthausen
	Bahnbrücke 50 m
(24)	Herne-Börnig
	Rest area Holthauser Bruck/Lussebrink
(25)	Castrop-Rauxel-Bladenhorst
(26)	Castrop-Rauxel B 235
(27)	Castrop-Rouxel-Ost 4-way interchange A 45 E41
(27)	Dortmund-Bodelschwingh
