= Bundesautobahn 524 =

Federal motorway in Germany

A 524
- Bundesautobahn 524

Route information
- Length: 6 km (3.7 mi)

Major junctions
- West end: Huckingen
- A 57 / E31
- East end: Breitscheid

Location
- Country: Germany
- States: North Rhine-Westphalia

Highway system
- Roads in Germany; Autobahns; List; Federal; List; State; E-roads

Bundesautobahn 524 (translates from German as Federal Motorway 524, short form Autobahn 524, abbreviated as BAB 524 or A 524) is an autobahn in Germany.

The A 524 is a short connector, heading west from Breitscheid and the A 52 towards Krefeld. The autobahn was built in the 1980s by upgrading the B 288. A short (1 km) section of freeway from the A 57 into Krefeld is also designated as part of the A 524.

Currently, an extension westward to the A 59 is listed as "high priority" in the latest Bundesverkehrswegeplan (Federal Transport Infrastructure Plan), and has started construction with completion slated for 2013. This project will be accompanied by a new free-flowing 4-way interchange to replace two low-capacity junctions: a T-intersection with the A 59 and a half-folded-diamond interchange with the B 8. Completion of the interchange is also set for 2013, with the older junctions expected to be closed at the same time.

Further extension along the B 288, across the Rhine and into Krefeld, is not listed in the Bundesverkehrswegeplan as being necessary at the present time. Rather, it is considered something that will only become important in the future. Therefore, it is only in planning, with construction beginning in 2016 at the earliest.

== Exit list ==
Legend:

- I/C - Interchange, I/S - Intersection, RSA - Rest and service area, OBR - Overhead bridge restaurant, R/R - Restaurant and rest plaza, L/B - Layby, V/P - Vista point, TN - tunnel, T/P - Toll plaza, BR - Bridge

State	District	Location	km	mi	Exit	Name	Destinations	Notes
North Rhine-Westphalia	N/A	524				Krefeld-Zenfrum I/C	A 57 / E31; B 57	Planned
North Rhine-Westphalia	N/A	524			Bahnbrücke(50 m, planned)			
North Rhine-Westphalia	N/A	524				Linn-Ost/Rheinhafen		Planned
North Rhine-Westphalia	N/A	524			Rheinbrücke (860 m, planned)			
North Rhine-Westphalia	N/A	524				Duisburg-Mündelheim		Planned
North Rhine-Westphalia	N/A	524				Duisburg-Huckingen		Under construction
North Rhine-Westphalia	N/A	524			2	Duisburg-Süd	A 59 / B 8 B 288	4-way interchange
North Rhine-Westphalia	N/A	524			3	Duisburg-Rahm		
North Rhine-Westphalia	N/A	524			Bahn- und Straßenbrücke, 70 m			
North Rhine-Westphalia	N/A	524			4	Ratingen-Lintorf		
North Rhine-Westphalia	N/A	524			5	Breitscheid	A 52	3-way interchange
1.000 mi = 1.609 km; 1.000 km = 0.621 mi: Proposed; Unopened
