= Germany–Netherlands border =

International border

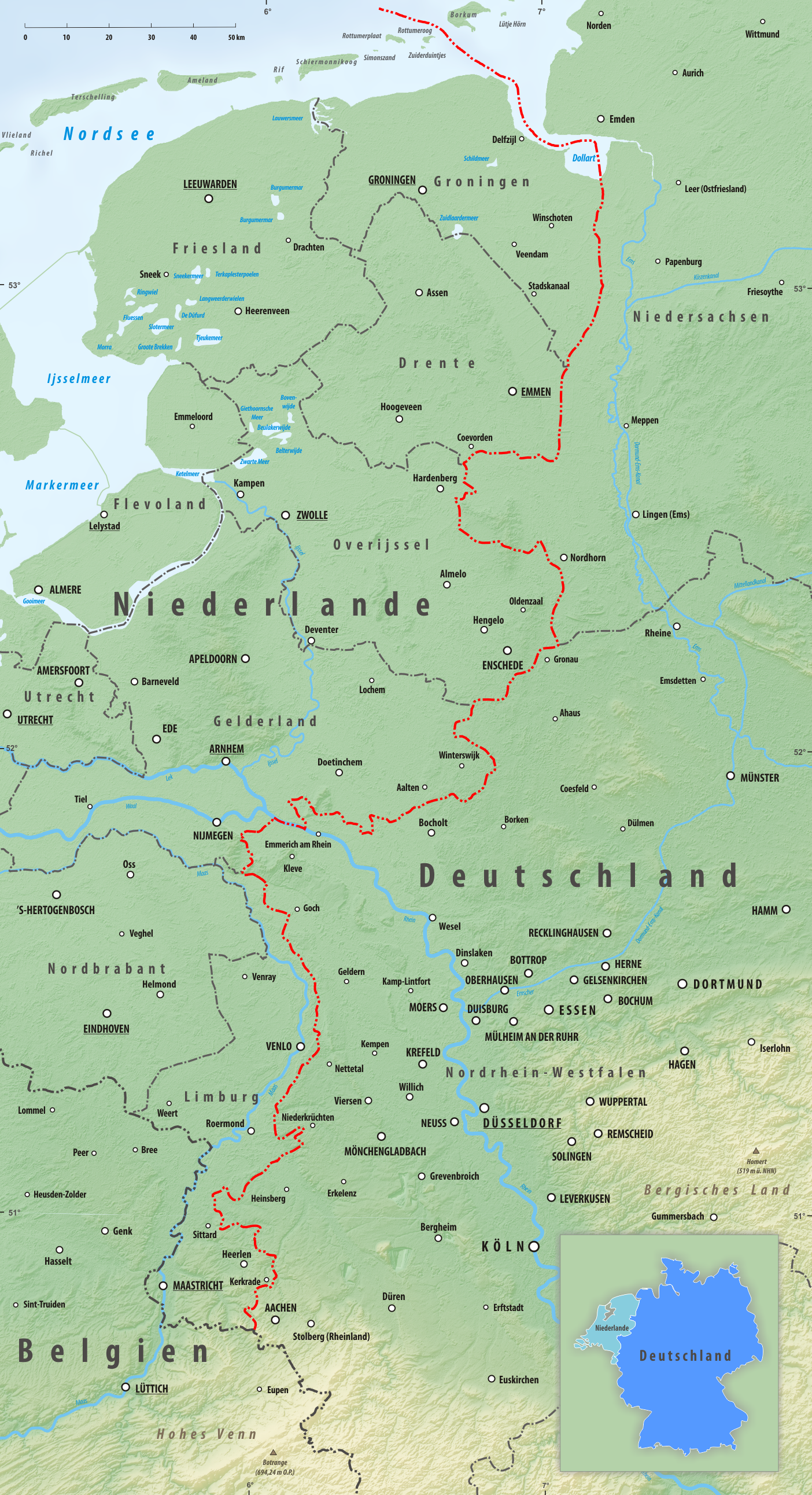
- Map of the Germany–Netherlands border.

Characteristics
- Entities: Germany Netherlands
- Length: 570 km (354 mi)

The Germany–Netherlands border (German: Grenze zwischen Deutschland und den Niederlanden; Dutch: Grens Duitsland-Nederland) consists of a 570-kilometre (350 mi) land and maritime border across the Dollart through the Frisian Islands into the North Sea.

== Land border ==
The border is located in the northwestern part of Germany and the east of the Netherlands. The border runs as a fairly irregular line from the shore of the Dollart bay which is part of the Ems river estuary in the north to the Belgium–Germany–Netherlands tripoint at Vaalserberg. The length of the border is around 570 kilometres (350 mi) in length, although the straight distance between the two border end points is 288 kilometres (179 mi).

The border runs along portions of rivers, including for eight kilometres (5.0 mi) along the large Rhine river. It also runs for about 100 kilometres (62 mi) along the Meuse valley, although most of the time a few kilometres to the east of the Meuse river rather than along it, before leaving the valley at the last portion of border to the border tripoint located at Vaalserberg about three kilometres (1.9 mi) west of Aachen.

The German states which share the international border are (from north to south) Lower Saxony and North Rhine-Westphalia while on the Dutch side, the provinces are Groningen, Drenthe, Overijssel, Gelderland and Limburg.

== Maritime border ==
The maritime border is disputed in a part of the Ems estuary outside the Dollart bay, where Germany has the view that the state border runs on the left bank of the Ems, while the Netherlands regards the Thalweg as its border. This is based on interpretations of old treaties. Germany relies on a bill of enfeoffment from 1464, when German Emperor Frederick III raised Ulrich I, the son of a local chieftain to the status of Imperial Count, in which the County of East Frisia is described as "von der Westeremse osterwards" (thus including the Ems). According to the Netherlands, this has lapsed in the French period – after the incorporation in France of both areas of West Frisia (now part of the Dutch provinces of Groningen and Friesland) and East Frisia (now part of the German state of Lower Saxony). Thus according to international law, the boundary should be at the center of the navigation channel.

In 2014 the two nations' foreign ministers met to put an end to the dispute. It was decided that the border should remain ambiguous and responsibility for the region in question shared.

== Border crossings ==
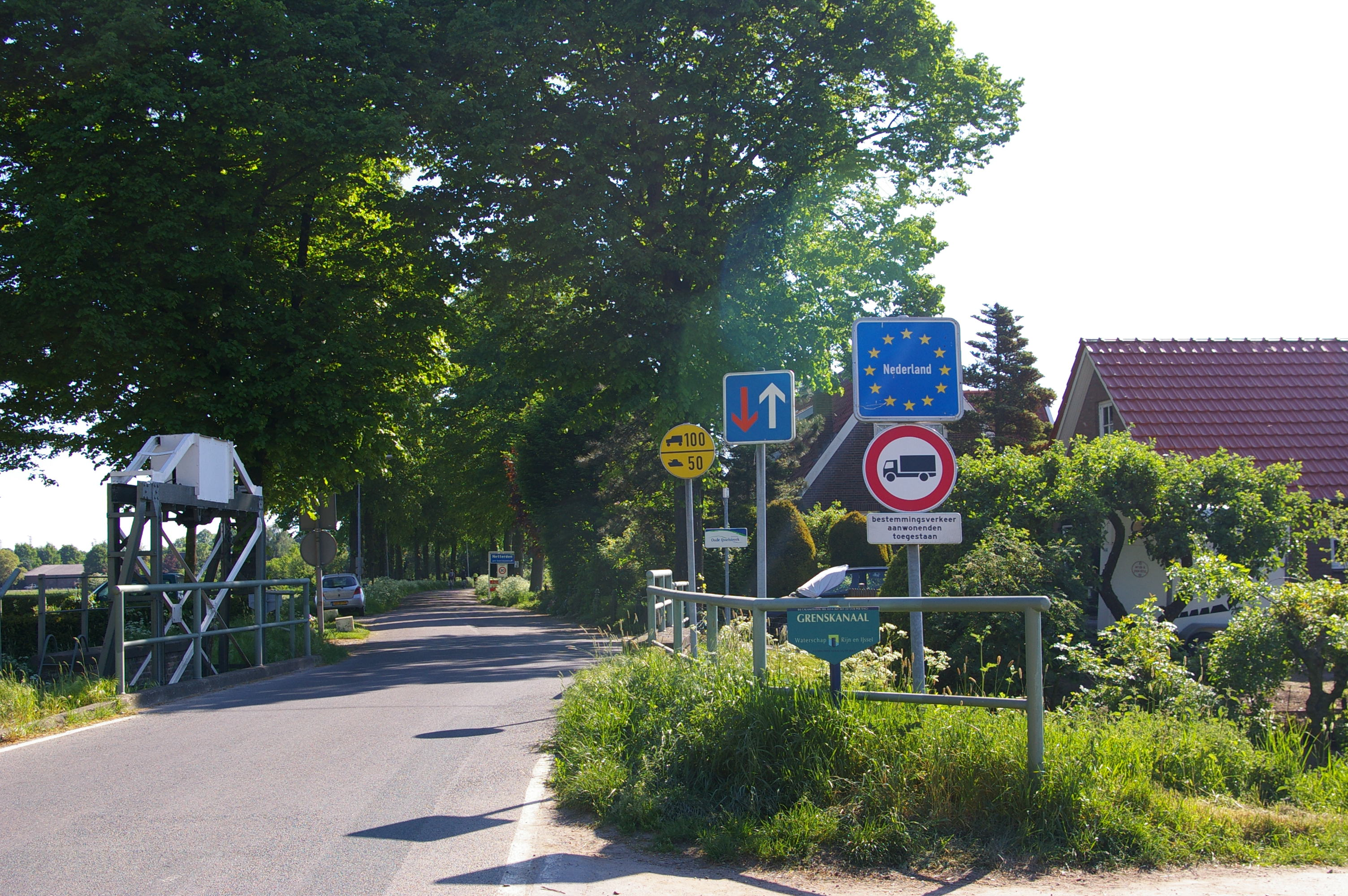
Border crossing at Netterden

There are at least 60 official road crossings and six railway crossings of the border. Both countries are part of the Schengen Area and the European Union, so there are minimal or non-existent border controls.

Motorways crossing the border
Dutch name	German name	European route
A7	A280	E22
A37	B402	E233
A1	A30	E30
A12	A3	E35
A77	A57	E31
A67	A40	E34
A74	A61	-
N280	A52	-
A76	A4	E314

Railways crossing the border:

- Ihrhove–Nieuweschans railway
- Almelo–Salzbergen railway
- Münster–Enschede railway
- Oberhausen–Arnhem railway
- Viersen–Venlo railway
- Sittard–Herzogenrath railway

== Border treaties ==
The modern border today is the result of centuries of border negotiations and agreements between the states and other political entities in the region, such as the Kingdom of Prussia, Kingdom of Hannover and the United Provinces of the Netherlands, of which Germany and the Netherlands ultimately became the modern day successor states. Many of the border agreements and treaties drawn up between these states were adopted by subsequent treaties and remain in force today.

=== Prussia and the Netherlands ===
Treaties with Prussia largely delimited and provided for the demarcation of the southern portion of the Germany–Netherlands border from Losser south to Vaals. Among the agreements and treaties were:

31 May 1815
Treaty between Great Britain, Austria, Prussia, and Russia, and Netherlands, signed in Vienna as part of the Congress of Vienna
26 June and 7 October 1816
Boundary Treaties between the Kingdom of Prussia and the Kingdom of the Netherlands signed in Aachen and Cleves
23 September 1818
General Record drawn up between the Kingdom of the Netherlands and the Kingdom of Prussia concerning the frontier lines, signed in Emmerich
11 December 1868
Treaty between the Kingdom of the Netherlands and the Kingdom of Prussia concerning the frontier line between the two States at several points between the province of Limburg and the district of Aachen signed in Aachen
30 October 1823
Instruments between the Kingdom of the Netherlands and the Kingdom of Prussia concerning abolition of the right of pasturage in fallow land (jus compascui) signed in Münster
11 April 1827
Further Agreement between the Kingdom of the Netherlands and the Kingdom of Prussia modifying the partial frontier along Gelderland fixed by the Agreement of 30 October 1823 and abolishing the right of pasturage in fallow land
23 June 1843
Final Protocol, with annexes, between the Kingdom of the Netherlands and the Kingdom of Prussia fixing the frontier line between Netterden and Vrasselt; signed in Emmerich
12 August 1872
Agreement between the Kingdom of the Netherlands and the Kingdom of Prussia defining the frontier line between the Netherlands commune of Dinxperlo and the Prussian commune of Suderwick; signed in Dinxperlo
22 August 1879
Agreement between the Kingdom of the Netherlands and the Kingdom of Prussia concerning the frontier line between the two States at the Netherlands commune of Winterswijk and the Prussian commune of Barlo, signed in Winterswijk
12 May 1880
Agreement between the Kingdom of the Netherlands and the Kingdom of Prussia defining the frontier between Eibergen and Ammeloe, signed in Eibergen
16 August 1883
Agreement between the Kingdom of the Netherlands and the Kingdom of Prussia adjusting the frontier between Eibergen and Ammeloe, signed in Bentheim
1 and 31 August 1882
Agreement between the Kingdom of the Netherlands and the Kingdom of Prussia fixing the State frontier at and in the section of the Buiten Aa lying between boundary stones No. 202 and 202a, which has been abandoned and filled in as a result of the construction in Netherlands territory of the Nieuwe Statenzijl (New State Dike-lock) signed in Aurich/Groningen; with Additional Declaration in Aurich/Groningen on 27 April and 29 May 1883.

=== Hannover and the Netherlands ===
Treaties with Hannover largely delimited and provided for the demarcation of the northern portion of the Germany–Netherlands border north of Losser. Among the agreements and treaties were:

2 July 1824
Frontier Treaty between the Kingdom of Hanover and the Kingdom of the Netherlands relating to the course of the frontier signed in Meppen
12 September 1825
Instrument between the Kingdom of the Netherlands and the Kingdom of Hanover defining the frontiers
14 and 19 March 1863
Exchange of declarations between the Netherlands and Hanoverian Governments fixing the frontier line in the Dollard, signed in The Hague and Hannover

=== Paris Protocol 1949 ===
The Paris Protocol of 22 March 1949, following World War II, the commission made 19 provisional changes in the frontier allowing the Netherlands to annex pieces of German territory totaling 26 square miles and 487 acres. The annexation was based on the Report by the Demarcation Commission of the Netherlands–German Frontier, signed at The Hague on 10 December 1949. The Netherlands annexed pieces of German territory as part of Second World War reparations.

=== Treaties with Germany ===
8 April 1960
"Treaty between the Kingdom of the Netherlands and the Federal Republic of Germany concerning the course of the common frontier, the boundary waters, real property situated near the frontier, traffic crossing the frontier on land and via inland waters, and other frontier questions", known in short as the "Frontier Treaty", was signed in The Hague. This treaty, which came into effect on 10 June 1963, provided for the return of most of the German territories annexed by the Netherlands under the Paris Protocol of 1949, thus establishing the land boundary of the two countries that exists to this day.

== See also ==
- Dutch annexation of German territory after the Second World War
- Germany–Netherlands relations
