= Flehe Bridge =

Bridge located in Düsseldorf

A 46 Fleher Brücke
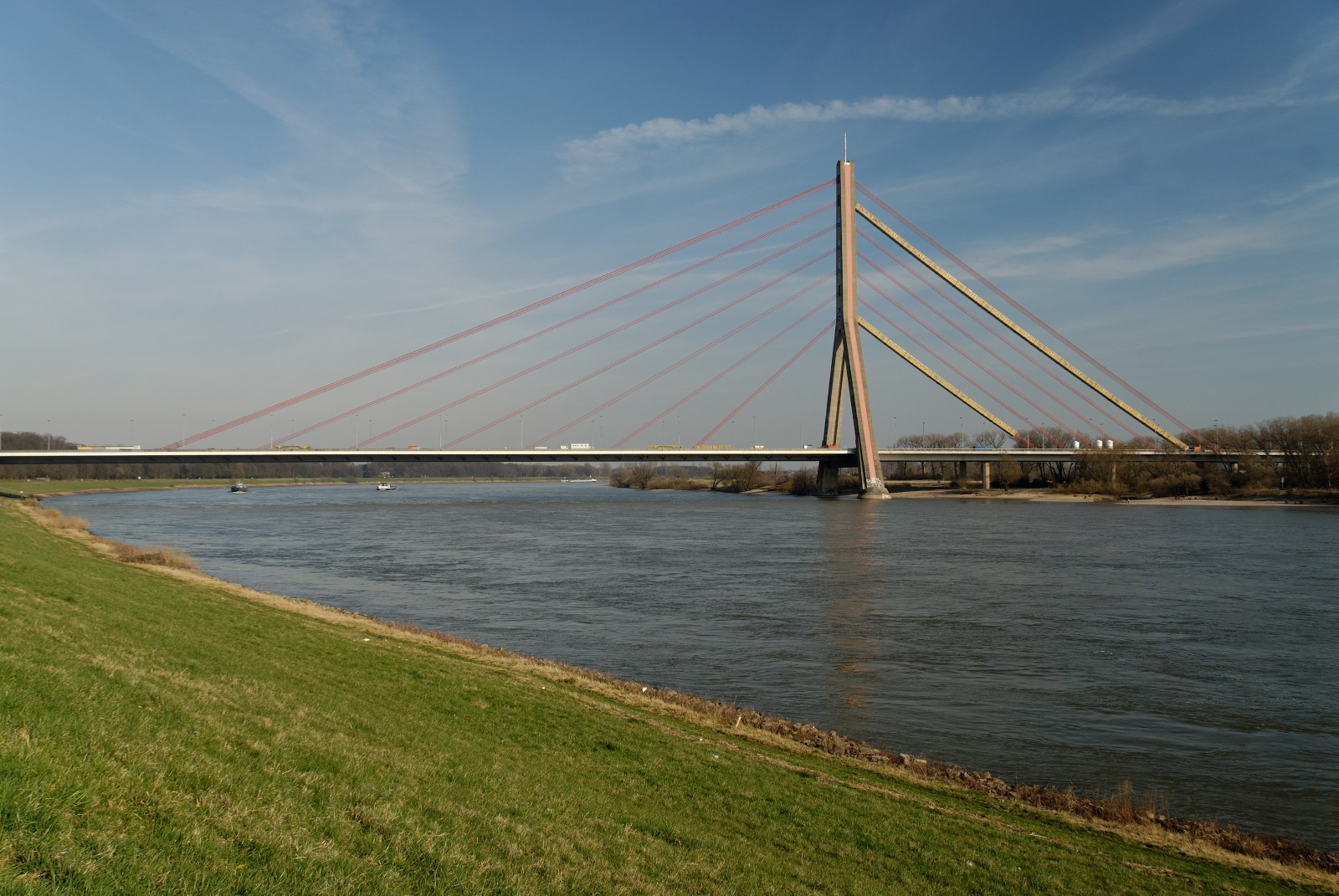
- Coordinates: 51°11′08″N 6°46′30″E
- Carries: Automobiles, Pedestrians, and Cyclists
- Crosses: Rhine

Characteristics
- Design: Cable-stayed bridge
- Total length: 1,166 metres (3,825 ft)
- Width: 41.7 metres (137 ft)
- Height: 146.47 metres (480.5 ft)
- Longest span: 368 metres (1,207 ft)
- Piers in water: 1

History
- Opened: 1979

Location
- Interactive map of A 46 Fleher Brücke

The Flehe Bridge, is a single tower cable stayed bridge over the Rhine near Düsseldorf. It connects the A 46 motorway from the left bank of the Rhine (Neuss, Aachen, Heinsberg district, the Netherlands) with the Bergisches Land on the right bank (Wuppertal, Solingen, Hagen) and the south of Düsseldorf. At the same time it forms the southern part of the motorway ring around Düsseldorf. It includes pedestrian and cycle paths.

The bridge opened in 1979 and relieved transit traffic south of Düsseldorf on the South Bridge (B 1), which were the only southern access from the left bank of the Rhine to Düsseldorf. It also connected the A 46 with the A 57. The Flehe Bridge has three vehicle lanes and a hard shoulder in each direction. The bridge does not cross the Rhine at right angles, in order to preserve the area of water procurement of the old water company Flehe. A remarkable feature of the Flehe bridge is the reinforced concrete suspension tower shaped like an inverted Y. In the handles of the pylons an elevator and stairs are accommodated above the roadway. The handles are in the longitudinal direction of the bridge only 6.4 metres (21 ft) broad. They were manufactured with a climbing formwork. The 13-section foreland bridge is a prestressed concrete construction work with a construction height of 3.80 metres (12.5 ft) and a total span of 13 by 60 metres (43 ft × 197 ft) = 780 metres (2,560 ft). Nine sections comprise two single-cell hollow boxes with ever 7.0 metres (23.0 ft) broad base plate. The remaining four sections within the range of the bridge removing possess a 5-cell box cross-section with base plate width of 29.5 metres (97 ft). A structural steelwork has the 368 metres (1,207 ft) river opening stretching far as if covered.

== See also ==
- List of bridges in Germany
