= Germany–Netherlands relations =

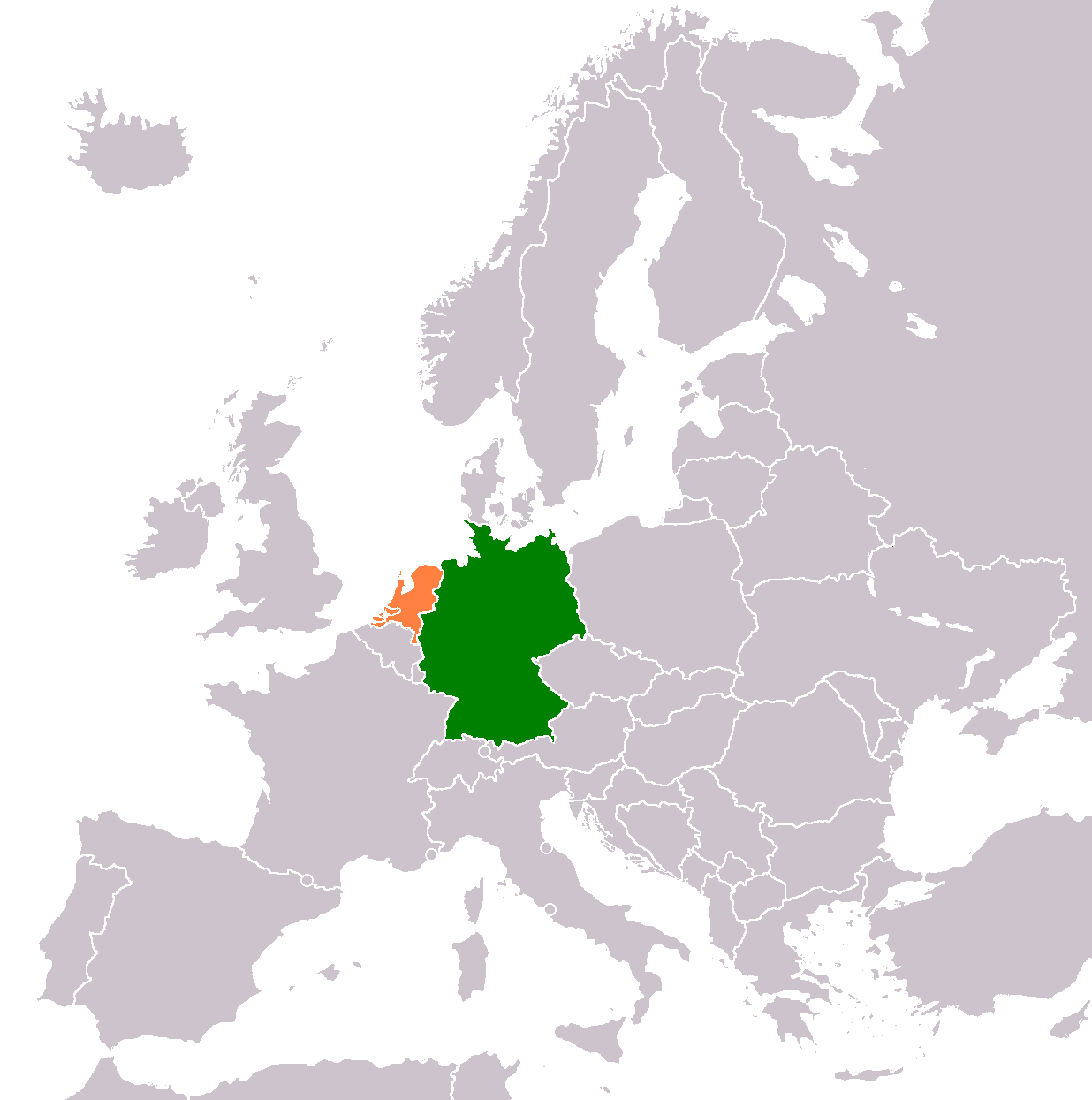

- Germany: Netherlands

Diplomatic mission
- Embassy of Germany, The Hague: Embassy of the Netherlands, Berlin

Envoy
- Ambassador Franz Josef Kremp: Ambassador Monique van Daalen

The bordering nations of Germany and the Netherlands maintain diplomatic, military and cultural ties. Relations between the modern states started after Germany became united in 1871. Before that the Netherlands had relations with Prussia and other, smaller German-speaking nations. Both countries are full members of the Council of Europe, the European Union and NATO.

== History ==
=== Early history ===
Significant parts of what are now Germany and the Netherlands formed the Roman Provinces of Germania, which gives Germany its namesake in English.

The Franks were a Germanic tribe that played a major role in the aftermath of the Roman Empire and originated from lands now in Germany and the Netherlands. The succession partitions of the Frankish Empire impacted cultural and political stratification between the lands of East Frankish Kingdom, Austrasia, and West Frankish Kingdom.

Germany and the Netherlands share a common history with their lands core to the Catholic Holy Roman Empire from the time of Charlemagne to the mid-second millennium.

The development of the Hanseatic League significantly impacted relations between what are now German and Dutch cities, stimulating and regulating trade with formal Guild relations and trade in the Baltic and North Sea.

In the 15th century, Mary of Burgundy, titular Duchess of Burgundy, reigned over the Burgundian State before she married Archduke Maximilian of Austria, the future Holy Roman Emperor Maximilian I, in 1477. The Seventeen Provinces arose from the Burgundian Netherlands, a number of fiefs held by the House of Valois-Burgundy and inherited by the Habsburg dynasty in 1482. Starting in 1512, the Provinces formed the major part of the Burgundian Circle. When Emperor Charles V, who secularized Prince-Bishopric of Utrecht, began the gradual abdication of his several crowns in October 1555, his son Philip II took over as overlord of the conglomerate of duchies, counties and other feudal fiefs known as the Habsburg Netherlands.

In 1566, the Dutch Revolt started and the Netherlands declared independence in 1581 which was recognized in 1648 when the Peace of Westphalia was signed. The Dutch Golden Age continued in peacetime, during which the Dutch government worked with well-known Germans such as Philipp Franz von Siebold and Caspar Schamberger in Dutch East Indies in Japan, or the Governor Peter Minuit in the New Netherland.

Prussia supported the Orangism faction. The Dutch and Prussians formed the Triplice of 1788 alongside Britain.

From the mid-17th century, the costly conflicts, including the Anglo-Dutch Wars, Franco-Dutch War and War of the Spanish Succession fuelled economic decline, with the French occupying the Netherlands and establishing the Batavian Republic and later the Kingdom of Holland. The Netherlands became independent again in 1813.

=== 20th century ===
During World War I, the Imperial German army refrained from attacking the Netherlands, and thus relations between the two states were preserved. The 1914 Septemberprogramm authorized by German Chancellor Theobald von Bethmann Hollweg proposed the creation of a Central European Economic Union, comprising a number of European countries, including Germany and the Netherlands, in which, as the Chancellor secretly stressed, there was to be a semblance of equality among the member states, but in fact it was to be under German leadership to stabilize Germany's economic predominance in Central Europe, with co-author Kurt Riezler admitting that the union would be a veiled form of German domination in Europe (see also: Mitteleuropa). The plan failed amid Germany's defeat in the war. At war's end in 1918, the former Kaiser Wilhelm II fled to the Netherlands, where he lived until his death in 1941.

The German army occupied the Netherlands during World War II and kept the country under occupation in 1940–1945. Adolf Hitler had considered the Netherlands suitable for annexation within the Greater Germanic Reich, viewing the Dutch as a related Germanic people. During this period, nearly three-quarters of the Dutch Jewish population were murdered in the Holocaust. Anne Frank was the most famous victim, as her diary survived and was published after the war. The Dutch famine of 1944–45, known in the Netherlands as the Hongerwinter (literal translation: hunger winter), was a famine that took place in the German-occupied Netherlands, especially in the densely populated western provinces north of the great rivers, during the winter of 1944–45, near the end of World War II. A German blockade cut off food and fuel shipments from farm towns. Some 4.5 million were affected and survived thanks to soup kitchens. At least 18–22,000 deaths occurred due to the famine. The famine was alleviated by the liberation of the provinces by the Allies in May 1945.

The Netherlands launched Operation Black Tulip in 1946 and annexed some German territories. The Netherlands and West Germany officially remained in a state of war with each other until 26 July 1951.

== Present ==
Germany has an embassy in The Hague and consuls in Amsterdam, Arnhem, Eindhoven, Enschede, Groningen, Leeuwarden, Maastricht, Noord-Beveland, Rotterdam, while the Netherlands has an embassy in Berlin and consuls in Düsseldorf, Frankfurt, Hamburg, Munich and Stuttgart. Both nations are members of the European Union and NATO.

According to the official website of the Dutch government, relations between the two are currently "excellent", enjoying "close political, economic, social, cultural, administrative and personal ties". Germany is also by far the Netherlands’ main trading partner, both in imports and exports.

== Emigration ==
As of 2017, around 164,000 people with a Dutch migration background resided in Germany. Around 77,000 Germans resided in the Netherlands.

== Resident diplomatic missions ==
- Germany has an embassy in The Hague and a consulate-general in Amsterdam.
- the Netherlands has an embassy in Berlin and consulates-general in Düsseldorf and Munich.
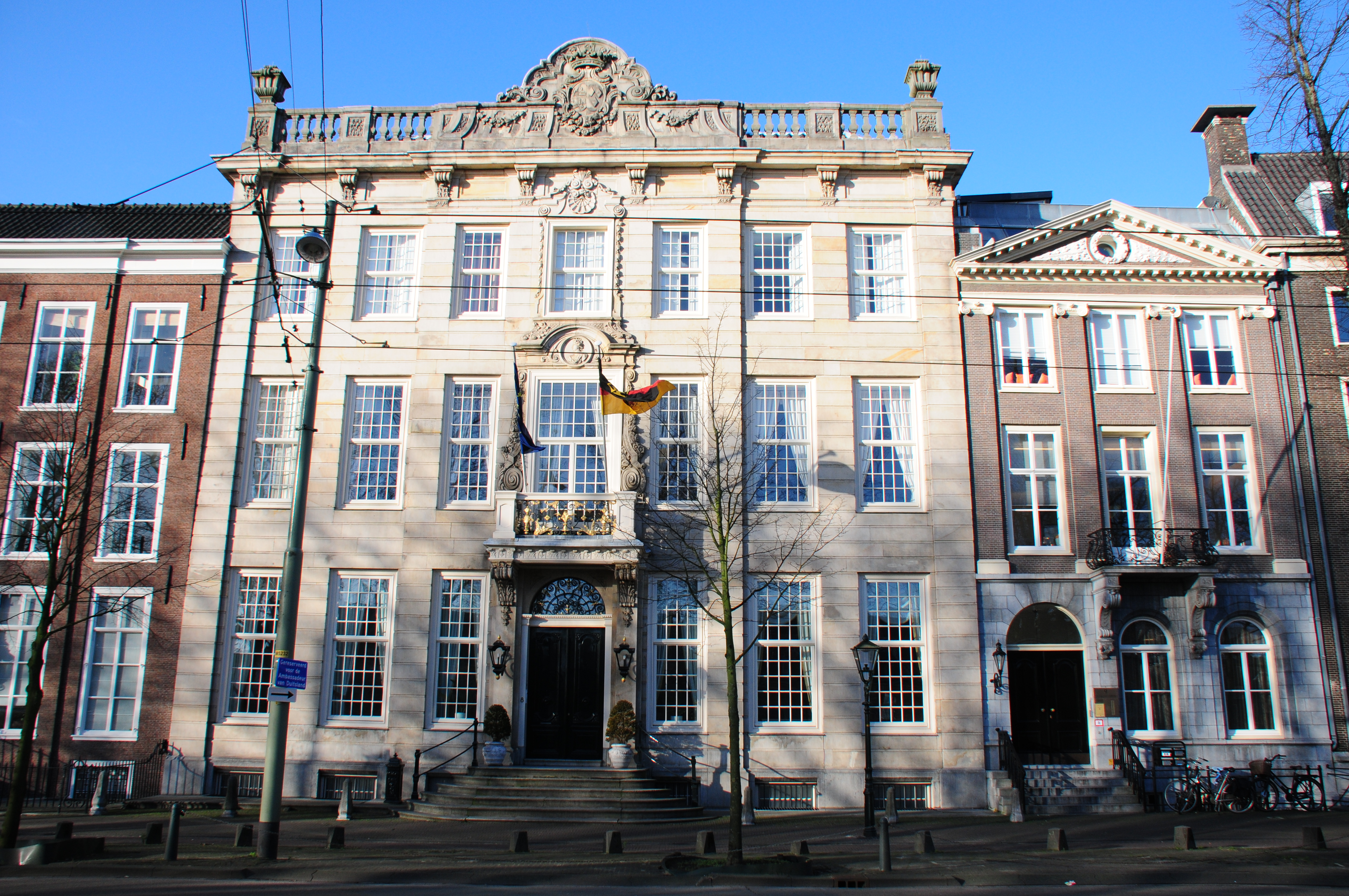
Embassy of Germany in The Hague

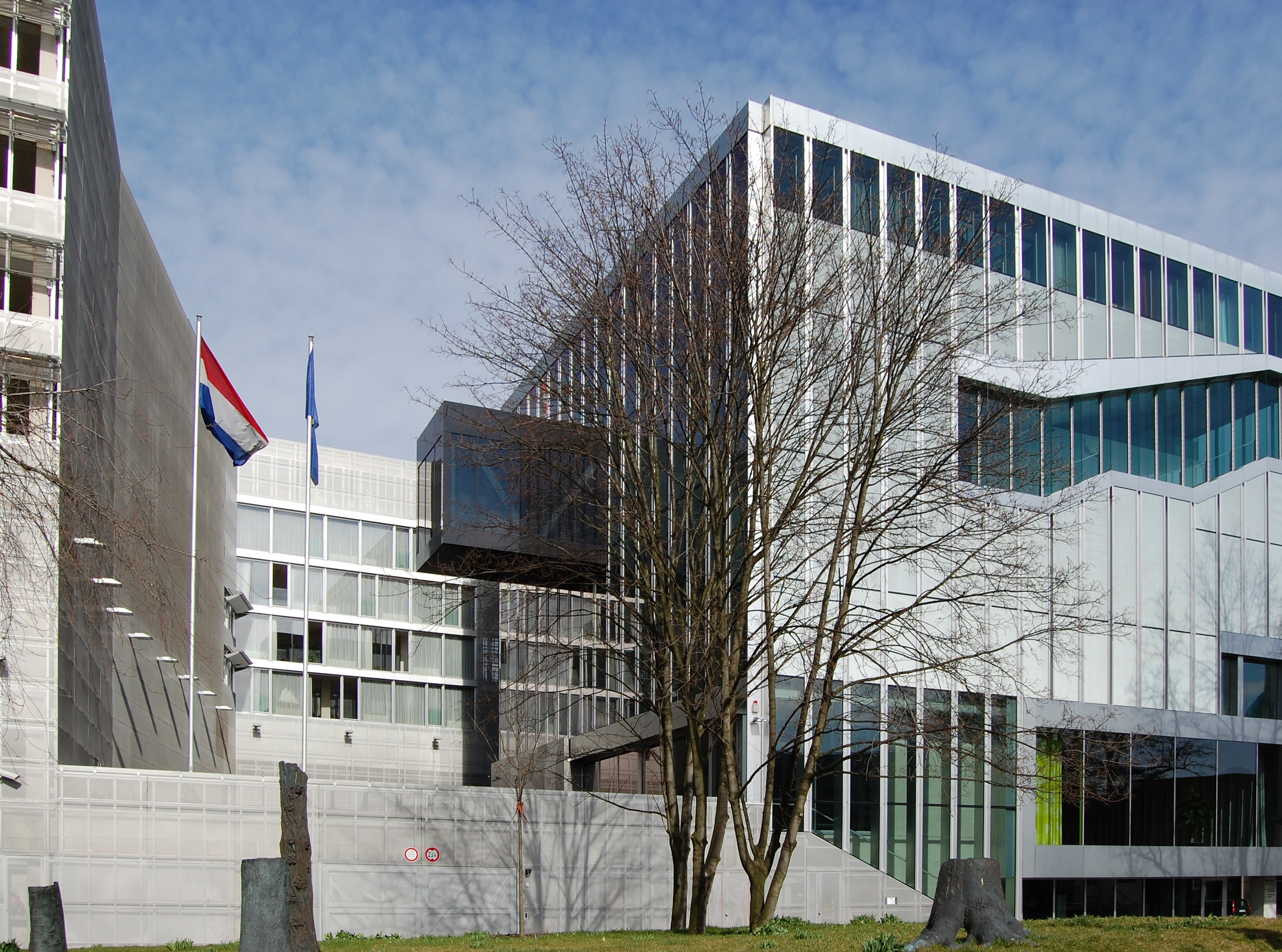
Embassy of the Netherlands in Berlin

== See also ==
- Germany–Netherlands border
- Germany–Netherlands football rivalry
- Germans in the Netherlands
- Dutch people in Germany
