= Kreuz Herne =

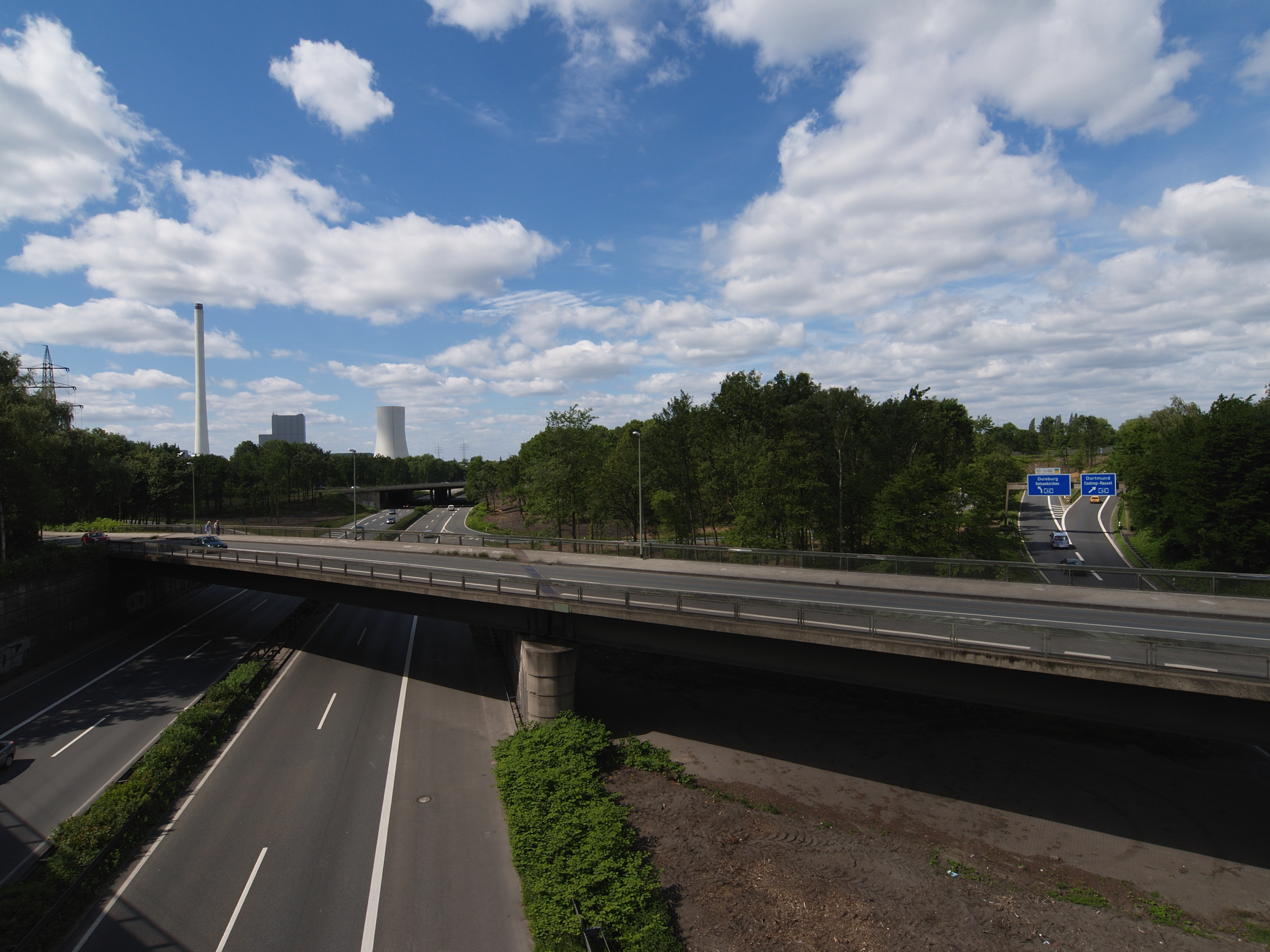

Location
- Herne, Germany
- Coordinates: 51°32′39.96″N 7°11′59.72″E: A 43; A 42

Construction
- Type: Combination interchange (with 2 cloveleaf links)
- Lanes: 2x2/2x2
- Opened: 1968 (adjusted 1975/1976)

The Kreuz Herne (German: Kreuz Herne) is a combination interchange with two cloverleaf links in the German state North Rhine-Westphalia.

The motorway interchange forms the connection between the A43 Kreuz Münstter-Süd-Kreuz Wuppertal-Nord and the A42 Kreuz Kamp-Lintfort-Kreuz Catrop Rauxel--Ost .

== Geography ==
The motorway interchange in the city district Mitte in Herne, Nearbe city districts are Herne-Eickel, Mitte and Baukau. The interchange is approximately 20 km west of Dortmund, Approximately 8 km north of Bochum and 15 km northeast of Essen.

Northwest of the interchange lays the Kraftwerk Herne the powerstation for the city.

== History ==
In 1968 the motorway interchange and the first part of the A42 were opened to traffic. Back then it was the th link between the des Emscherschnellweg with the EB 51 (temporary road) which later was replaced by the A 43. In the mid 1970s the interchange was changed again due to the build of the A 43.

== Building form and road layout ==
Near the motorway interchange both motorways are built with 2x2 lanes. The links A 43-North—A 42-east and A 42-west—A 43-South having 2 lanes all the other connections have one lane.

Due to the tight space it is built in, they chose a mixform between a Windmill interchange and a Cloverleaf interchange.

== Traffic near the interchange ==
Approximately 155,000 vehicles use the interchange on a daily basis.

From	To	Average Daily traffic	Percentage of heavy traffic
AS Herne-Crange (A 42)	AK Herne	79.700	9,8 %
AK Herne	AS Herne-Baukau (A 42)	59.000	9,6 %
AS Recklinghausen-Hochlarmark (A 43)	AK Herne	80.900	6,5 %
AK Herne	AS Herne-Eickel (A 43)	87.700	7,9 %
