= Bundesautobahn 43 =

Federal motorway in Germany

A 43
- Bundesautobahn 43

Route information
- Length: 95 km (59 mi)

Major junctions
- North end: A 1 in Münster
- South end: A 1/A 46 in Wuppertal

Location
- Country: Germany
- States: North Rhine-Westphalia

Highway system
- Roads in Germany; Autobahns; List; Federal; List; State; E-roads
← A 42	→ A 44

Bundesautobahn 43 (translates from German as Federal Motorway 43, short form Autobahn 43, abbreviated as BAB 43 or A 43) is an autobahn in western Germany, connecting Münster via Recklinghausen to Wuppertal. It is an important bypass for traffic coming from the A 1 wanting to go to the western Ruhr valley and wanting to avoid tailbacks at the Kamener Kreuz near Dortmund.

== Exit list ==
B 51
(2)	Münster-Süd 4-way interchange A 1
(3)	Senden B 235
(4)	Nottuln B 525
(5)	Dülmen-Nord B 474n
(6)	Dülmen B 474
(7)	Lavesum
	Services Hohe Mark
(8)	Haltern B 58
	Lippebrücke
(9)	Marl-Nord 4-way interchange A 52
(10)	Marl-Sinsen
(11)	Recklinghausen/Herten B 225
(12)	Recklinghausen 4-way interchange A 2
(13)	Recklinghausen-Hochlarmark
	Rhein-Herne-Kanal-Brücke
(14)	Kreuz Herne 4-way interchange A 42
(15)	Herne-Eickel
(16)	Bochum-Riemke B 51
(17)	Bochum 4-way interchange A 40
(18)	Bochum-Laer
(19)	Bochum/Witten 4-way interchange A 44
(20)	Witten-Heven
	Ruhrbrücke
(21)	Witten-Herbede
(22)	Sprockhövel B 51
(23)	Wuppertal-Nord 4-way interchange A 1, A 46
