= Kreuz Hilden =

Cloverleaf interchange in North Rhine Westphalia, Germany

- Interactive map of Kreuz Hilden

Location
- Hilden, Germany
- Coordinates: 51°11′40.39″N 6°56′21.94″E: A 3; A 46

Construction
- Type: Cloverleaf interchange
- Lanes: 2x2/2x3
- Opened: 1987

The Kreuz Hilden (German: Autobahnkreuz Hilden) is a cloverleaf interchange in the German state North Rhine Westphalia.

The motorway interchange forms the connection between the A3 Dutch border northwest of Emmerich am Rhein-Austrian south of Passau and the A46 Heinsberg-Kreuz Wuppertal-Nord.

== Geography ==
The motorway interchange lays within the city limits of Hilden, after which it is named. Nearby cities are Düsseldorf, Erkrath, Haan and Solingen. The interchange lays approximately 15 km (9.3 mi) east of the city centre of Düsseldorf and approximately 30 km (19 mi) north of Cologne. When you follow the A 3 form here further north you will pass the Neanderthal valley.

== History ==
In this region the A3 was constructed in 1936, as part of the Reichsautobahn from Cologne to Düsseldorf. Back then the Hildener Kreuz was built as a normal motorway exit as a connection to the Landstraße Unterbach–Hilden. The A 46 was built here in 1972 as B 326 also known as (Wupperschnellweg).

== Reconstruction 2010 ==
Between April and September 2010 they widened the connection towards Düsseldorf to two lanes to make the traffic flow better. the acceleration lanes we also lengthened to let the heavy traffic blend in better on the A 3. The A3 between the motorway interchange and the motorway exit Mettmann was also given a new roadsurface.

== Building form and road layout ==
The motorway interchange "Kreuz Hilden" is built on a cloverleaf interchange. Near the interchange the A 3 as well as the A 46 are built in a 2x3 layout. Originally all the connections were built with one lane. During the resurfacing of the A3, due to the heavy traffic, the connection towards Düsseldorf was widened to two lanes.

== Specials ==
On the A 46 the Kreuz and the exit towards Landesstraße 403 (Exit Hilden) are double exits.

== Traffic near the interchange ==
Approximately 230,000 vehicles use the interchange on a daily basis. This makes it to one of the busiest motorway interchanges in North Rhine-Westphalia.

From	To	Average daily traffic
AS Mettmann (A 3)	AK Hilden	129,000
AK Hilden	AS Solingen (A 3)	119,200
AS Erkrath (A 46)	AK Hilden	101,600
AK Hilden	AS Hilden (A 46)	111,600
