= A77 motorway (Netherlands) =

Freeway in the Netherlands

A77 motorway
- Rijksweg 77
- Location of the A77 motorway

Route information
- Length: 10 km (6.2 mi)

Major junctions
- West end: A73 in Boxmeer
- East end: Boxmeer; A 57 border with Germany

Location
- Country: Kingdom of the Netherlands
- Constituent country: Netherlands
- Provinces: North Brabant, Limburg

Highway system
- Roads in the Netherlands; Motorways; E-roads; Provincial; City routes

The A77 motorway is a short motorway in the Netherlands. It is located in the Dutch provinces of North Brabant and Limburg.

== Overview ==
The road is 10 kilometer in length. The A77 motorway connects the A73 motorway at the interchange Rijkevoort with Boxmeer, Gennep and the German Bundesautobahn 57.

The European route E31 follows the entire length of the A77 motorway.

== Exit list ==
Province	Municipality	km	mi	Exit	Name	Destinations	Notes
North Brabant	Boxmeer			—	Interchange Rijkevoort	E31 / A 73	West end of E 31 overlap
North Brabant	Boxmeer			1	Boxmeer	N 621	
Limburg	Gennep			2	Gennep	N 271	
Limburg	Gennep			—	—	E31 / A 57	Border with Germany; this road continues as the German A 57; east end of E 31 overlap
1.000 mi = 1.609 km; 1.000 km = 0.621 mi: Concurrency terminus
