= Free-flow interchange =

Unsignalled, fully grade separated road junction

A free-flow interchange is an interchange in which all roads are grade-separated, and where movement from one road to another does not require the driver to stop for traffic (for example, the interchange may not include traffic lights or unsignalized at-grade intersections). Free-flow interchanges are less likely to induce traffic congestion than non-free-flow, but are typically more expensive both in money and in land.

Some free-flow interchanges bring additional problems such as weaving or passing lane/fast lane exits (i.e. left exits in areas with right-hand traffic, and vice versa) that may be necessary to avoid additional costs, but lead to congestion and accidents and ultimately to an upgrade to another type of interchange.

A free flow interchange design called double crossover merging interchange (DCMI) has received a patent. The DCMI includes elements from the diverging diamond interchange (DDI) and the standard diamond interchange. It eliminates the disadvantages of weaving and of merging into the outside lane from which the standard DDI variation suffers.

== Examples of free-flow interchanges ==
- Stack interchange
- Cloverleaf interchange
- Trumpet interchange
- Cloverstack interchange
- Directional T
- Semi-directional T
- Turbine (whirlpool) interchange

== Examples of interchanges that are not free-flow ==
- Diamond interchange
- Partial cloverleaf interchange
- Three-level diamond interchange
- Diverging diamond interchange
