= Bundesautobahn 445 =

Federal motorway in Germany

A 445
- Bundesautobahn 445

Route information
- Length: 13 km (8.1 mi)

Location
- Country: Germany
- States: North Rhine-Westphalia

Highway system
- Roads in Germany; Autobahns; List; Federal; List; State; E-roads

Bundesautobahn 445 (translates from German as Federal Motorway 445, short form Autobahn 445, abbreviated as BAB 445 or A 445) is an Autobahn in Germany.

It begins in Werl and ends to the Bundesautobahn 46 near Arnsberg. The government of Germany is planning to expand it from Werl to Hamm, where it is supposed to end up in the Bundesautobahn 2. Some environmental protectors are complaining about the expansion because the fear some irrevocable damage for the nature around the road.

== Exit list ==
Intersection		3-way interchange Hamm (planned) A 2 E34
		Hamm-Rhynern (planned)
		Werl-Sönnern (planned)
	(58a)	Werl-Nord B 63
		Bahnbrücke 50 m
	(59)	Werl-Zentrum B 1
	(60)	Werl 4-way interchange A 44 E331
	(61)	Wickede B 63
		Ruhrtal/Haus Füchten parking area
Intersection		3-way interchange Neheim (planned) A 46
A 46
