= Bundesautobahn 57 =

Federal motorway in Germany

A 57
- Bundesautobahn 57
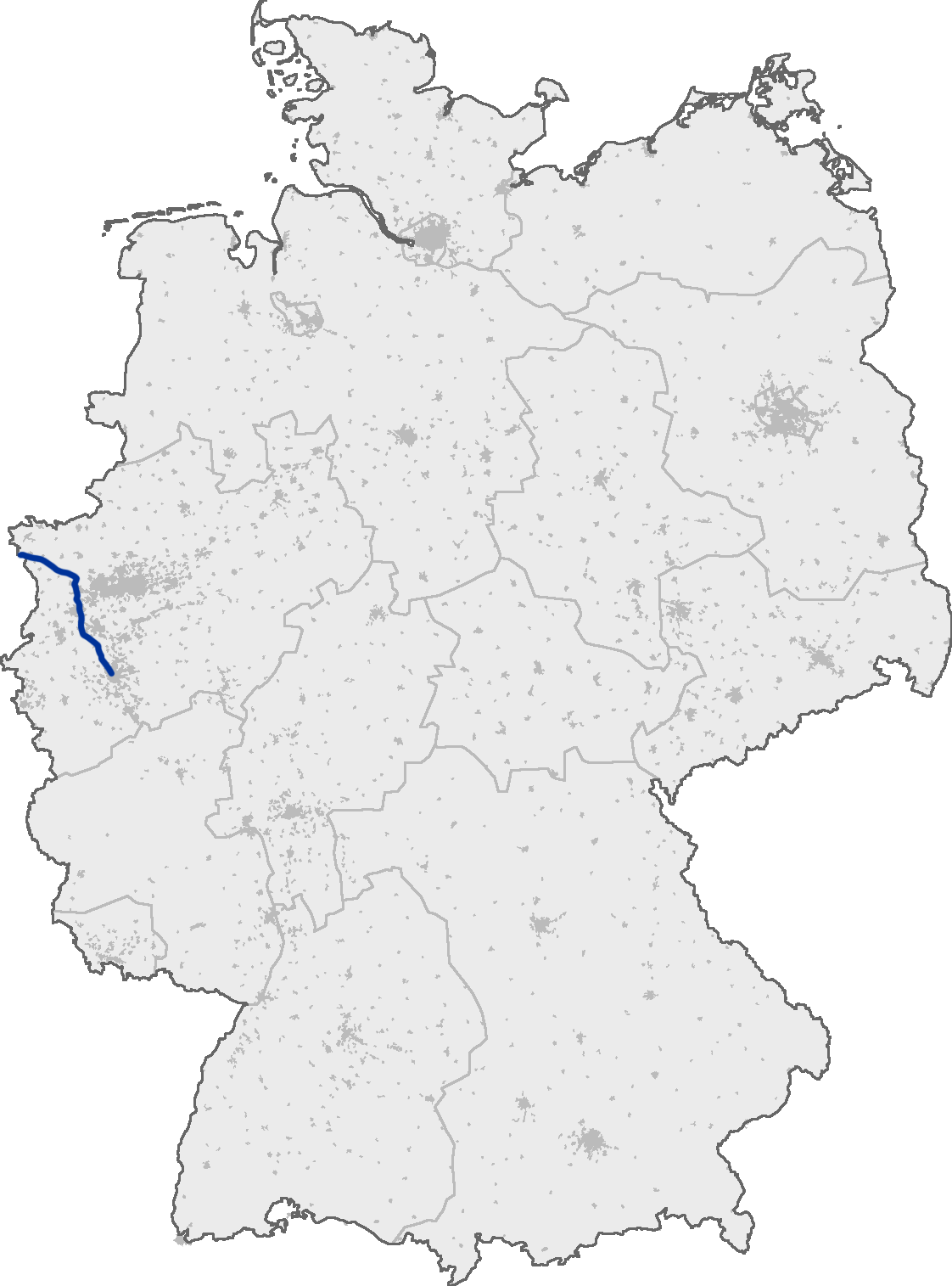

Route information
- Length: 128 km (80 mi)

Location
- Country: Germany
- States: North Rhine-Westphalia

Highway system
- Roads in Germany; Autobahns; List; Federal; List; State; E-roads
← A 52	→ A 59

Bundesautobahn 57 (translates from German as Federal Motorway 57, short form Autobahn 57, abbreviated as BAB 57 or A 57) is a German Autobahn that begins at the Dutch-German border near Goch and ends in Köln. It runs parallel to the Rhine River. Neuss and Krefeld are the biggest cities on this motorway. The A 57 is a continuation of the Dutch A77. Because of its high economic importance, its nickname is "Trans-Niederrhein-Magistrale". Most of it is two lanes each way and prone to traffic jams during rush hour.

Currently, sections 15–18, 19–24, and 29–30 have three lanes each way. The section from junction 28 to 29 southbound has the possibility to open the hard shoulder as a third lane in heavy traffic. Traffic jams are possible between junctions 10 and 15, 17 and 20, as well as around junctions 27 and 28. There is a variable speed limit between junctions 10 and 23. The sections from junctions 23 to 24 and 27 to 30 have a limit of 100 km/h. Between junctions 27 and 28, the limit was reduced to 80 km/h between 10 pm and 6 am.

== Exit list ==
	From interchange Rijkevoort A 73 (NL)
A 77 E31	Netherlands
(1)	Goch border crossing
	Grenzstation Goch parking area
	Kendelbrücke 90 m
(2)	Kleve B 9
(3)	Goch B 9 B 67
	Niers
	Services Kalbecker Forst
(4)	Uedem
(5)	Sonsbeck
	Hamb parking area
	Bönninghardt parking area
(6)	Alpen B 58
	Leucht parking area
	Brücke Fossa Eugeniana 60 m
(7)	Rheinberg B 510
(7a)	Asdonkshof
(8)	Kamp-Lintfort
(8)	Kamp-Lintfort 4-way interchange A 42 B 528
	Rest area Dong
(9)	Moers-Hülsdonk
(10)	Moers 4-way interchange A 40 E34
(11)	Moers-Kapellen
(12)	Krefeld-Gartenstadt B 509
	Kreuz Krefeld-Zentrum (planned) A 524 B 57
	Hochstraße 330 m
(14)	Krefeld-Oppum
	Services Geismühle
(15)	Meerbusch 4-way interchange A 44
(16)	Bovert
(17)	Kaarst 4-way interchange A 52
(18)	Holzbüttgen
	Straßen- und Bahnbrücke 70 m
	Rest area Morgensternsheide
(19)	Büttgen
(20)	Neuss-West 4-way interchange A 46
(21)	Neuss-Reuschenberg B 477
(22)	Neuss-Hafen B 1
(23)	Neuss-Norf B 9
(24)	Neuss-Süd 3-way interchange A 46
	Dormagen-Delrath (planned)
	Tankstelle Nievenheim
(25)	Dormagen
(26)	Köln-Worringen
	Rest area Esch/Weiler
(27)	Köln-Chorweiler
(28)	Köln-Nord 4-way interchange A 1 E31 E37
(28)	Köln-Longerich
(29)	Köln-Bickendorf
(30)	Köln-Ehrenfeld
