= Monique van Daalen =

Dutch diplomat

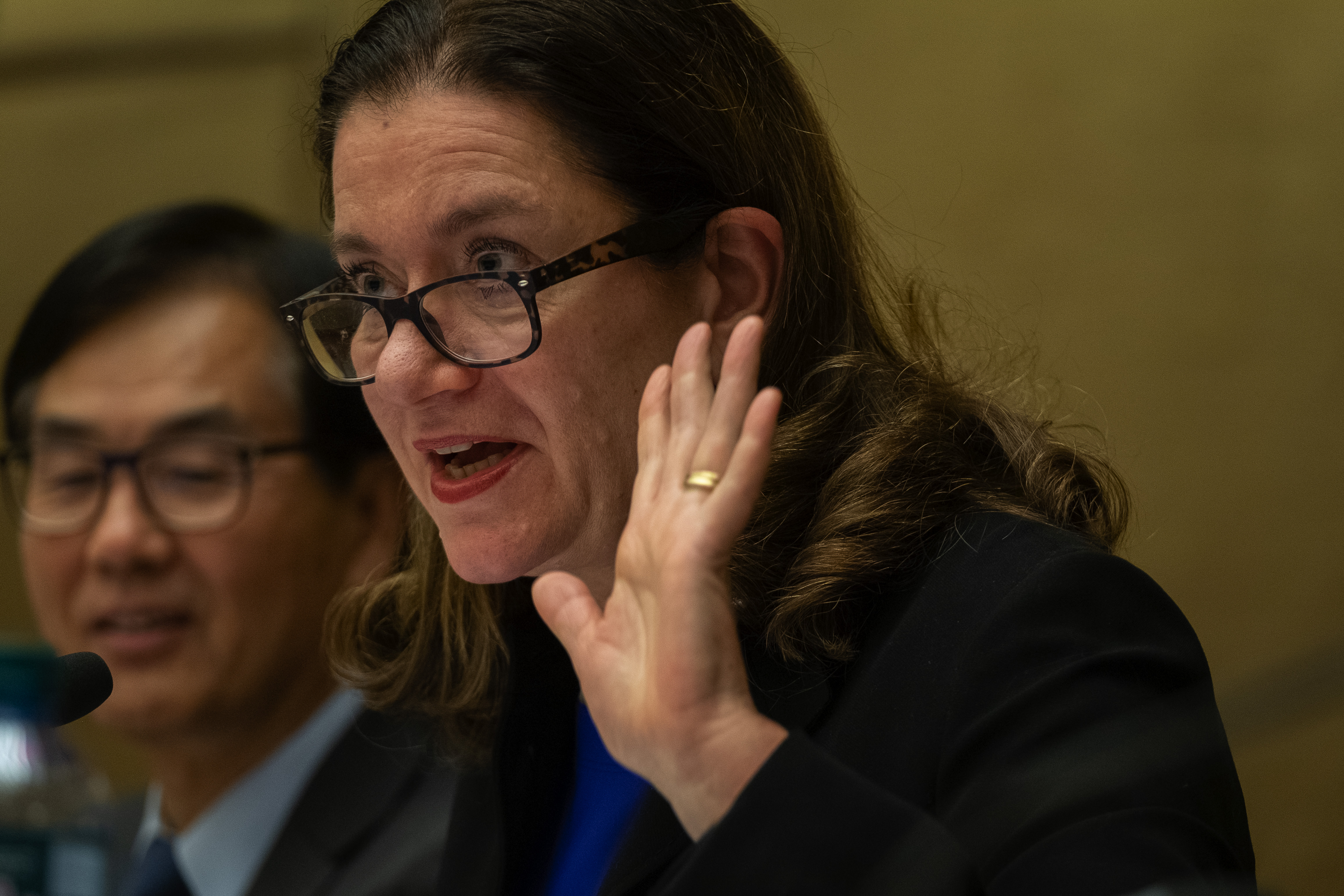
- in 2019 by Gerry Kiruthu
- Born: 1960 (age 65–66); Amsterdam
- Education: University of Amsterdam
- Occupation: Ambassador
- Spouse: yes
- Children: 2

Her Excellency Monique T. G. Van Daalen (born 1960) is a Dutch diplomat. She was the Ambassador and Permanent Representative of The Netherlands to the United Nations.

== Life ==
Van Daalen was born in Amsterdam in 1960. She attended the University of Amsterdam where she obtained a Master’s degree in Modern Asian History. She already had graduate degrees in International Law and Art History and Archaeology.

In 1988 she joined the Ministry of Foreign Affairs and after a training year she spent two years in South Korea. She returned to The Hague in 1991 and rose to join the Dutch Permanent Mission to the United Nations as a First Secretary in 1996. She spent three years in Miami and more time at The Hague before being appointed the Dutch Ambassador to Germany in 2013.

She became the Ambassador and Permanent Representative of The Netherlands to the United Nations and other international organizations in Geneva in 2013. She was in this role in 2017 when she spoke on behalf of several European delegations to send delegates chosen by Zeid Raad Al Hussein to investigate human rights violations committed in Yemen's war.
