= Kamener Kreuz =

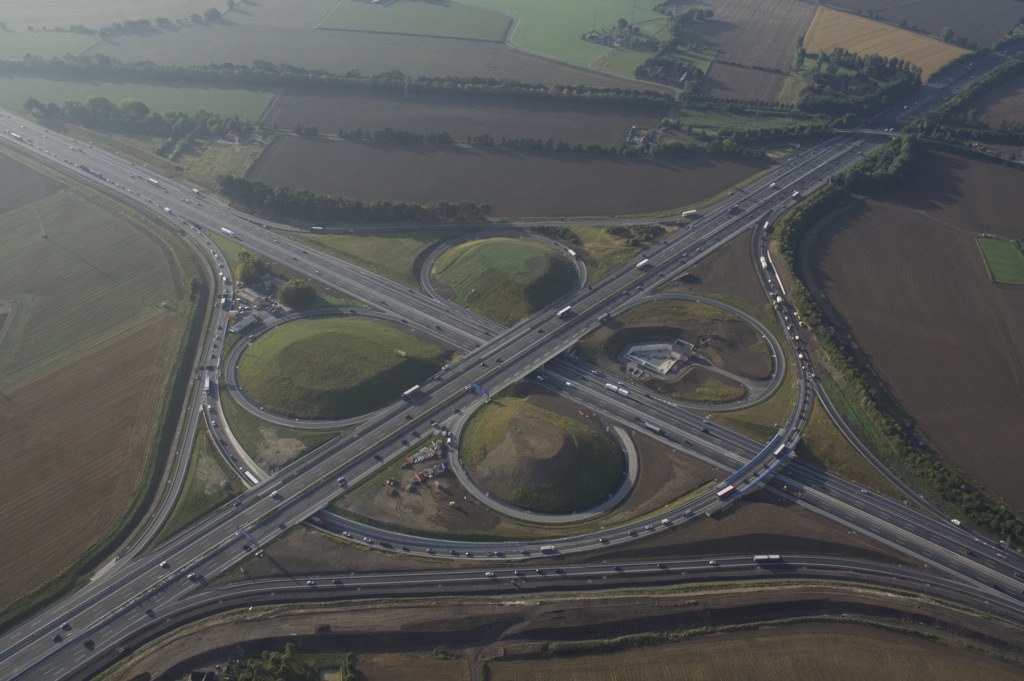
- Aerial view of the Kamener Kreuz

Location
- Kamen, near Dortmund, Germany
- Coordinates: 51°36′03″N 7°41′14″E
- Roads at junction: A 1; A 2

Construction
- Opened: 1937

The Kamener Kreuz was formerly a full cloverleaf interchange near Dortmund in North Rhine-Westphalia Germany where the Autobahnen A1 and A2 meet. It lies between the towns of Kamen and Bergkamen in the west and the city of Hamm and the municipality Bönen in the east. The Kamener Kreuz, opened in 1937, was the second interchange between two Reichsautobahnen, the first one being the Schkeuditzer Kreuz. It is used by 160,000 vehicles per day.

Between 2006 and 2009, the Kamener Kreuz was renovated and upgraded to three lanes in each direction. This required to replace the old A1 bridge by a new one. Additionally, an overfly ramp from A2-East (Hannover) to A1-South (Cologne) was built, so the interchange had no longer the shape of a classic cloverleaf.

The portion of the A1 between the Kamener Kreuz and Dreieck Erfttal is traditionally one of the most congested sections of Autobahn in Germany.

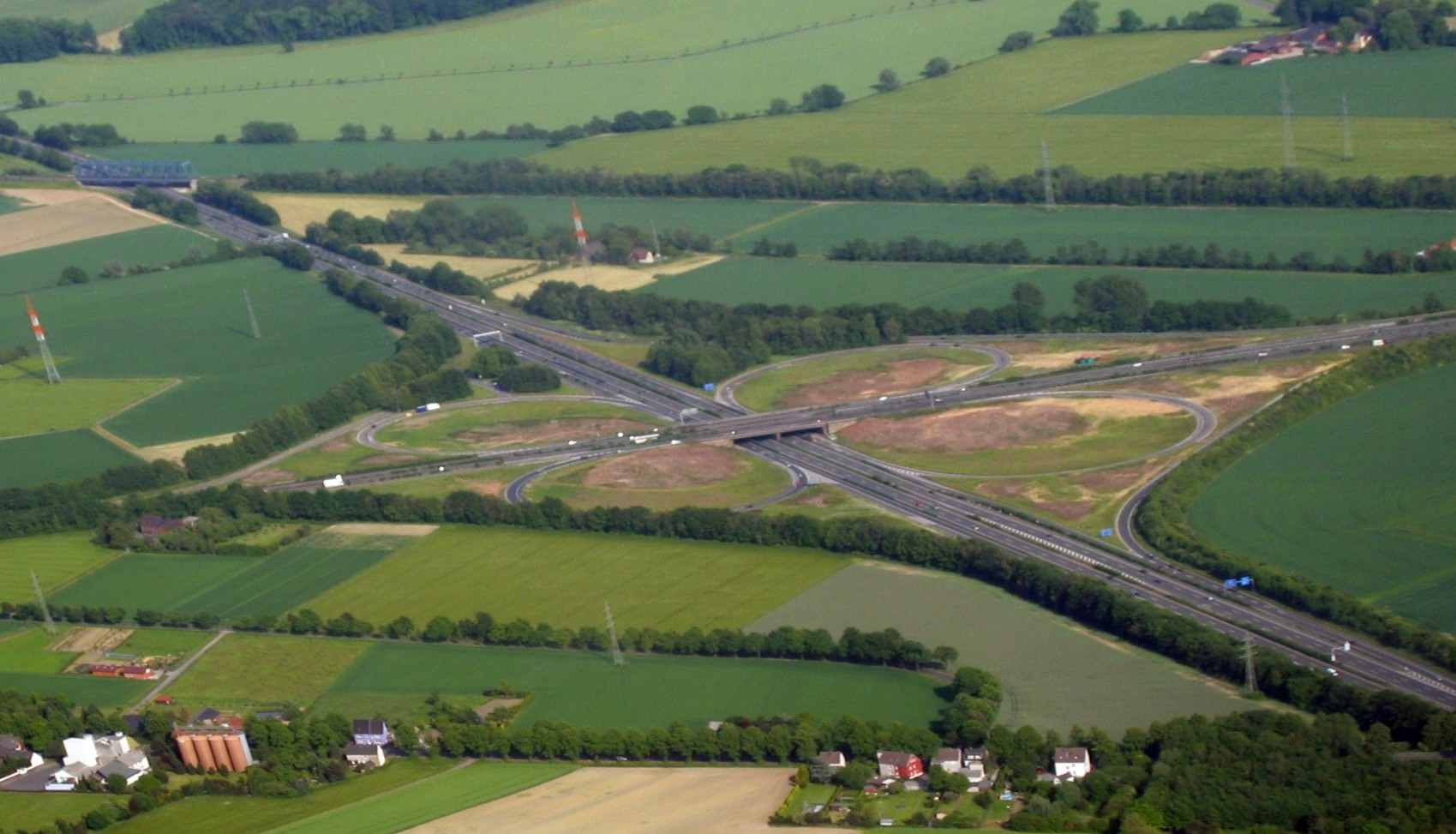
Kamener Kreuz in August 2005 before the upgrade

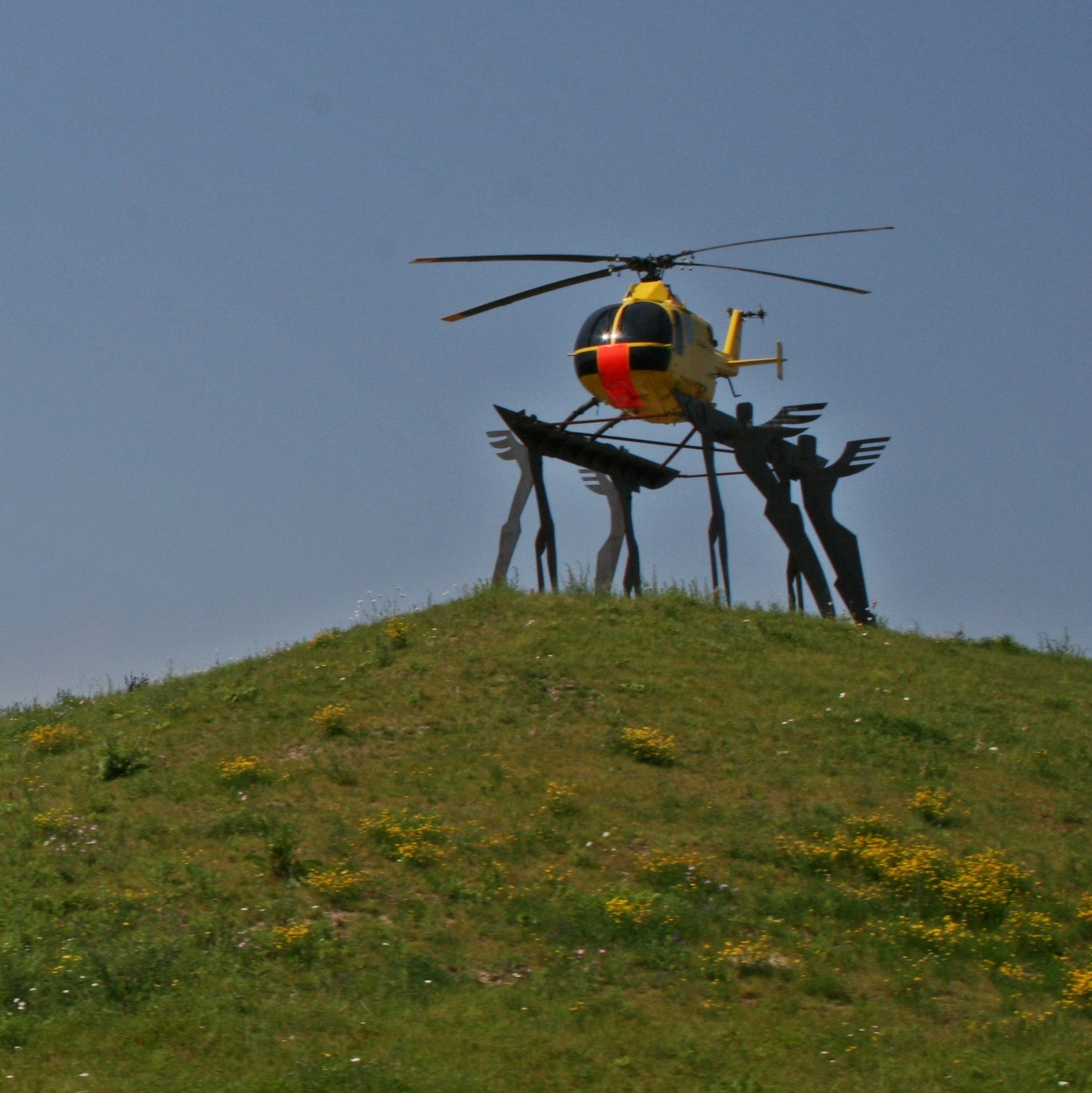
Artwork on northwest hill above Kamener Kreuz
