= Ratingen-Breitscheid =

Coordinates: 51.3519°N 6.8658°E

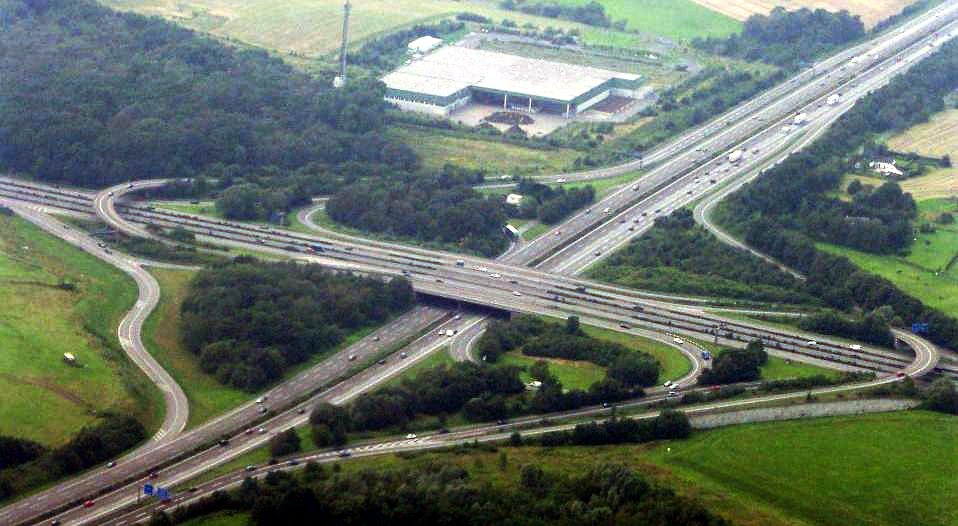
The Breitscheid motorway junction in Ratingen, looking east from west. It connects A 3 (below), A 52 (above) and A 524 (not visible outside the picture above left)

Breitscheid (German pronunciation: [ˈbʁaɪtˌʃaɪt]) is a quarter of the city Ratingen in Germany.
