= Diverging diamond interchange =

Freeway interchange design

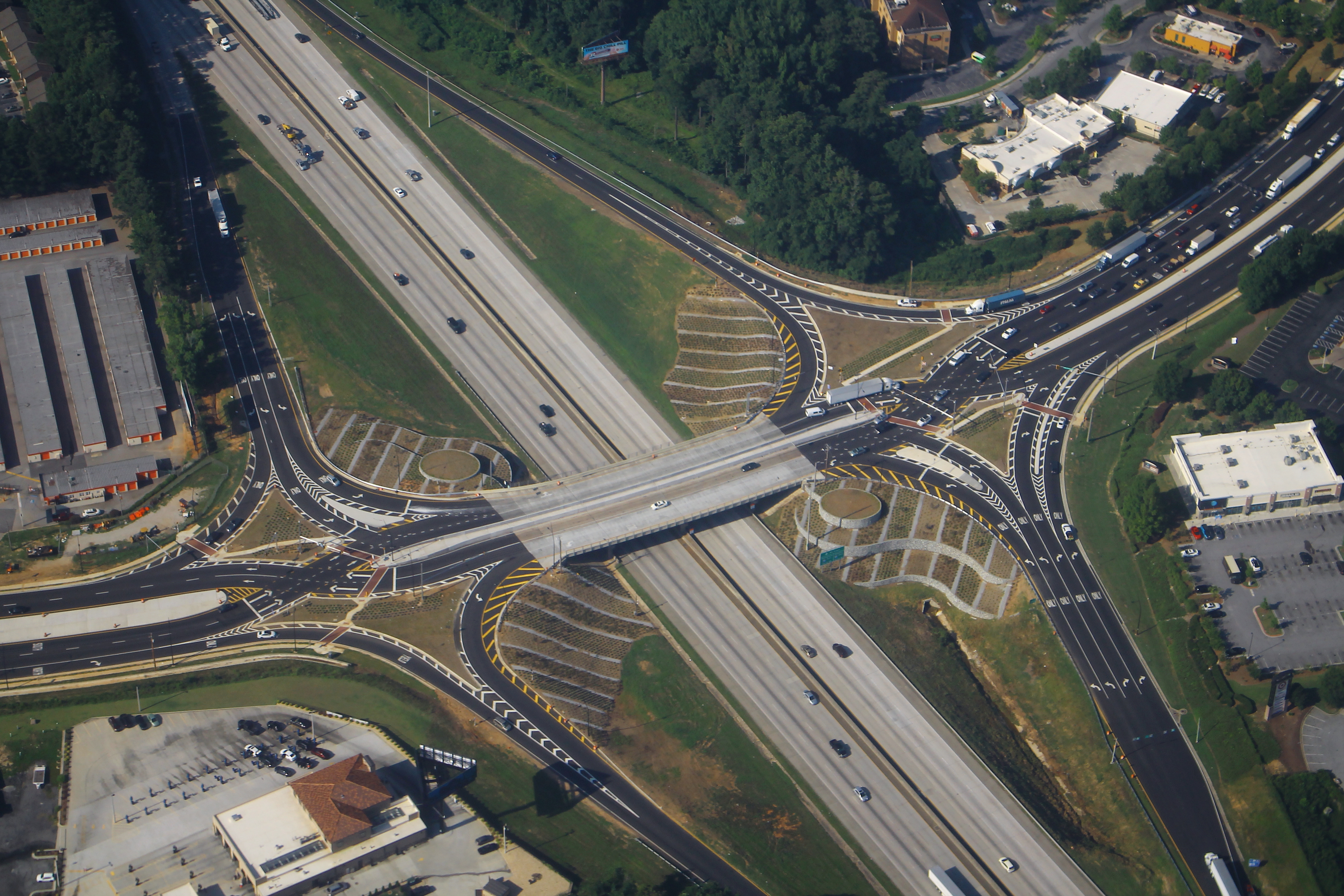
A diverging diamond at Interstate 285 and Camp Creek Parkway in East Point, Georgia 33°39′23.5″N 84°29′51.5″W

A diagram illustrating traffic movements in the interchange

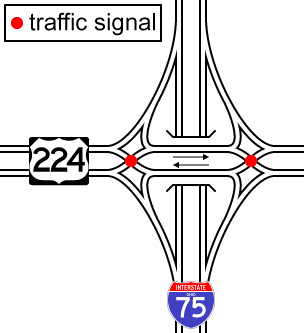
Plan of rejected diverging diamond interchange in Findlay, Ohio

A diverging diamond interchange (DDI), also called a double crossover diamond interchange (DCD), is a subset of diamond interchange in which the opposing directions of travel on the non-freeway road cross each other on either side of the interchange so that traffic crossing the freeway on the overpass or underpass is operating on the opposite driving side from that which is customary for the jurisdiction. The crossovers may employ one-side overpasses or be at-grade and controlled by traffic lights.

The diverging diamond interchange has advantages in both efficiency and safety and was cited by Popular Science as one of the best engineering innovations of 2009, despite having been sparsely used in its contemporary form in France as early as the 1970s. It has been promoted in the U.S. as part of the Federal Highway Administration's Every Day Counts initiative. The flow through a diverging diamond interchange using overpasses at the crossovers is limited only by weaving, and the flow through an implementation using traffic lights is subject to only two clearance intervals (the time during which all lights are red so that the intersection may fully clear) per cycle.

The greatest safety concern of the interchange stems from its relative rarity, as drivers instinctively trying to stay on the customary side of the road could use the crossover intersections to turn against the posted direction of travel. This is a rare occurrence; it is possible only when traffic is so sparse that no cars from the oncoming direction are stopped at the light, and clear signage further reduces the likelihood of such errors.

== History ==
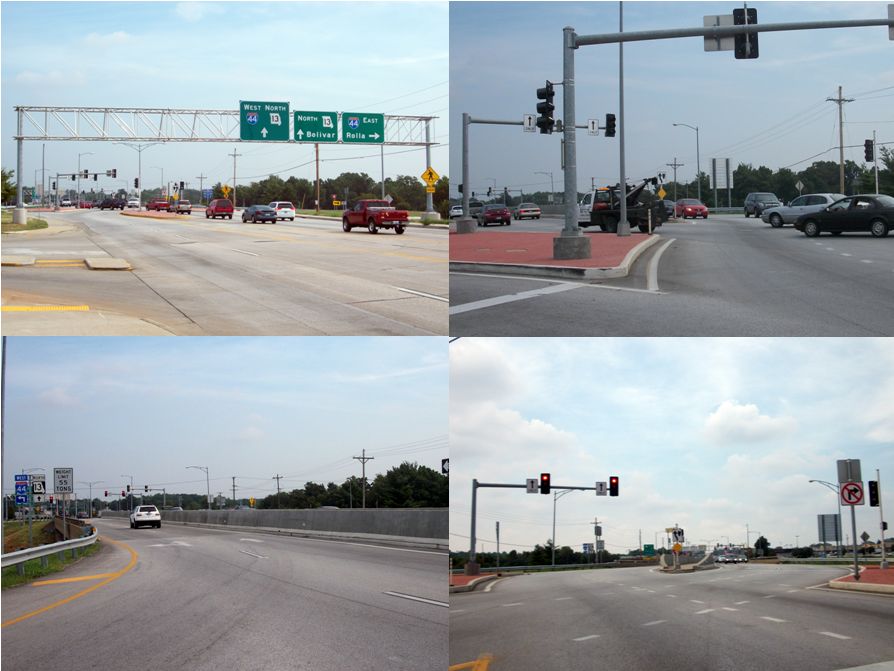
Pictures from the first diverging diamond interchange in the United States, in Springfield, Missouri Top left: Traffic enters the interchange along Missouri Route 13 Top right: Traffic crosses over to the left side of the road Bottom left: Traffic crosses over Interstate 44 Bottom right:Traffic crosses back over to the right side of the road.

Lunchtime traffic at the diverging diamond interchange at the James River Freeway and Route 13 in Springfield

The first known diverging diamond interchanges were built in France during the 1970s, in the communities of Versailles (A13 at D182), Nogent-sur-Marne (A4 at N486) and Seclin (A1 at D549; featuring an asymmetrical 2/4 lane layout). The Nogent-sur-Marne interchange originally was a contraflow left interchange, then reorganized as a diverging diamond interchange in the 1980-90s, and has been completely rebuilt with a more standard layout in 2019; the other two continue to function as diverging diamond interchanges. A three-way derivative which may be considered a related precursor was also built in the UK on the M1 in 1969 to provide access to London Gateway services (formerly Scratchwood Services).

In the United States, invention of the diverging diamond interchange is credited to Gilbert Chlewicki. In 2005, the Ohio Department of Transportation (ODOT) considered reconfiguring the existing interchange on Interstate 75 at U.S. Route 224 and State Route 15 west of Findlay as a diverging diamond interchange to improve traffic flow. Had it been constructed, it would have been the first DDI in the United States. By 2006, ODOT had reconsidered, instead adding lanes to the existing overpass.

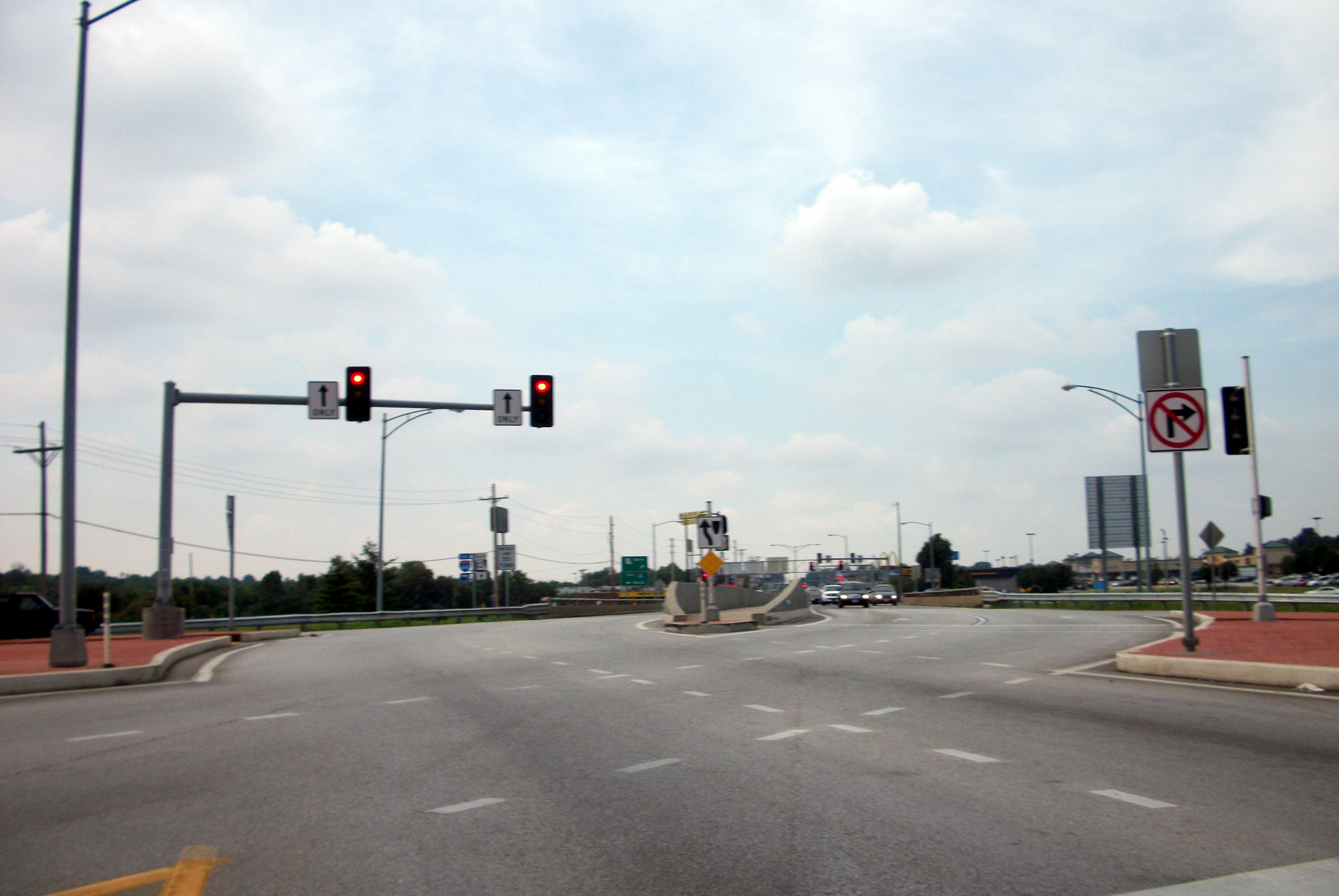
Southbound approach to the I-44/Route 13 interchange in Springfield

The Missouri Department of Transportation (MoDOT) was the first US agency to construct one, in Springfield at the junction between I-44 and Missouri Route 13 (at 37.2503°N 93.3107°W). Construction began the week of January 12, 2009, and the interchange opened on June 21, 2009. This interchange was a conversion of an existing standard diamond interchange, and used the existing bridge. MoDOT reports that traffic congestion for left turns at the intersection cleared up immediately, and crashes dropped by 40–50%.

In 2010, the Federal Highway Administration released a publication titled "Alternative Intersections/Interchanges: Informational Report (AIIR)" with a chapter dedicated to this design. Additional research was conducted by a partnership of the Virginia Polytechnic Institute and State University and the Turner-Fairbank Highway Research Center and published by Ohio Section of the Institute of Transportation Engineers.

On August 14, 2011, the Kentucky Transportation Cabinet (KYTC) completed conversion of the intersection of U.S. Route 68 and Kentucky Route 4 in Lexington to a diverging diamond design, the first in the state and the sixth completed nationally. Stantec, the engineers who completed the upgrades to the interchange, noted the solution while providing substantial cost savings over other possible options also has decreased accidents by 45 percent, improved traffic flow to more than 35,000 vehicles per day, and incorporated KYTC's goal to provide new paths for bicycles and pedestrians through the area. That same day in Highland, Utah the seventh U.S. diverging diamond interchange opened at the intersection of I-15 and Timpanogos Highway. According to the U.S. Department of Transportation the goals of this intersection upgrade were similar, increasing traffic capacity and improved pedestrian and bicycle access while reaching these goals without requiring substantial revisions to the existing interstate overpass. Quoting a June 2014 USDOT publication, "the DDI has made travel more efficient and accessible for all users."

The year 2016 saw the introduction of diverging diamond interchanges by three states. In February, the Oregon Department of Transportation opened one in Phoenix. In October, the New Mexico Department of Transportation converted the crossing of NM 14 (Cerrillos Road) and Interstate 25 in Santa Fe. In November, the Delaware Department of Transportation completed the conversion of the DE-1 and DE-72 (Wrangle Hill Rd) overpass west of Delaware City.

The first interchange in Canada opened on August 13, 2017, at Macleod Trail and 162 Avenue South in Calgary, Alberta followed by one east of Regina, Saskatchewan the next year as part of the Regina Bypass project.

The first diverging diamond interchange in Australia opened to traffic by the Queensland Department of Transport and Main Roads on November 28, 2019. The interchange, located in Caloundra, Queensland, connects Caloundra Road to the Bruce Highway. The former interchange was upgraded and converted as part of the larger Bruce Highway Upgrade Program.

In December 2019, the Virginia Department of Transportation completed the conversion of the interchange at Courthouse Road and I-95 in Stafford, VA into a diverging diamond interchange.

In 2020, the California Department of Transportation (Caltrans) completed the first diverging diamond interchange in California. An interchange at State Route 120 and Union Road in Manteca, California was converted to this interchange and opened to traffic on November 25.

=== Divergabout ===
In the 2010s MoDOT designed a hybrid of a diverging diamond interchange and a roundabout that they call a "divergabout". The first opened at Interstate 49/U.S. Route 71 and 155th Street where Belton meets Grandview and Kansas City on December 15, 2017, with a second following on May 11, 2018, in nearby Lee's Summit at U.S. Route 50 and Missouri Route 291/Jefferson Street, and a third on October 16, 2026, on Interstate 70/U.S. Route 40 at Route T/Route W in Foristell.

== Use ==
=== Operational ===
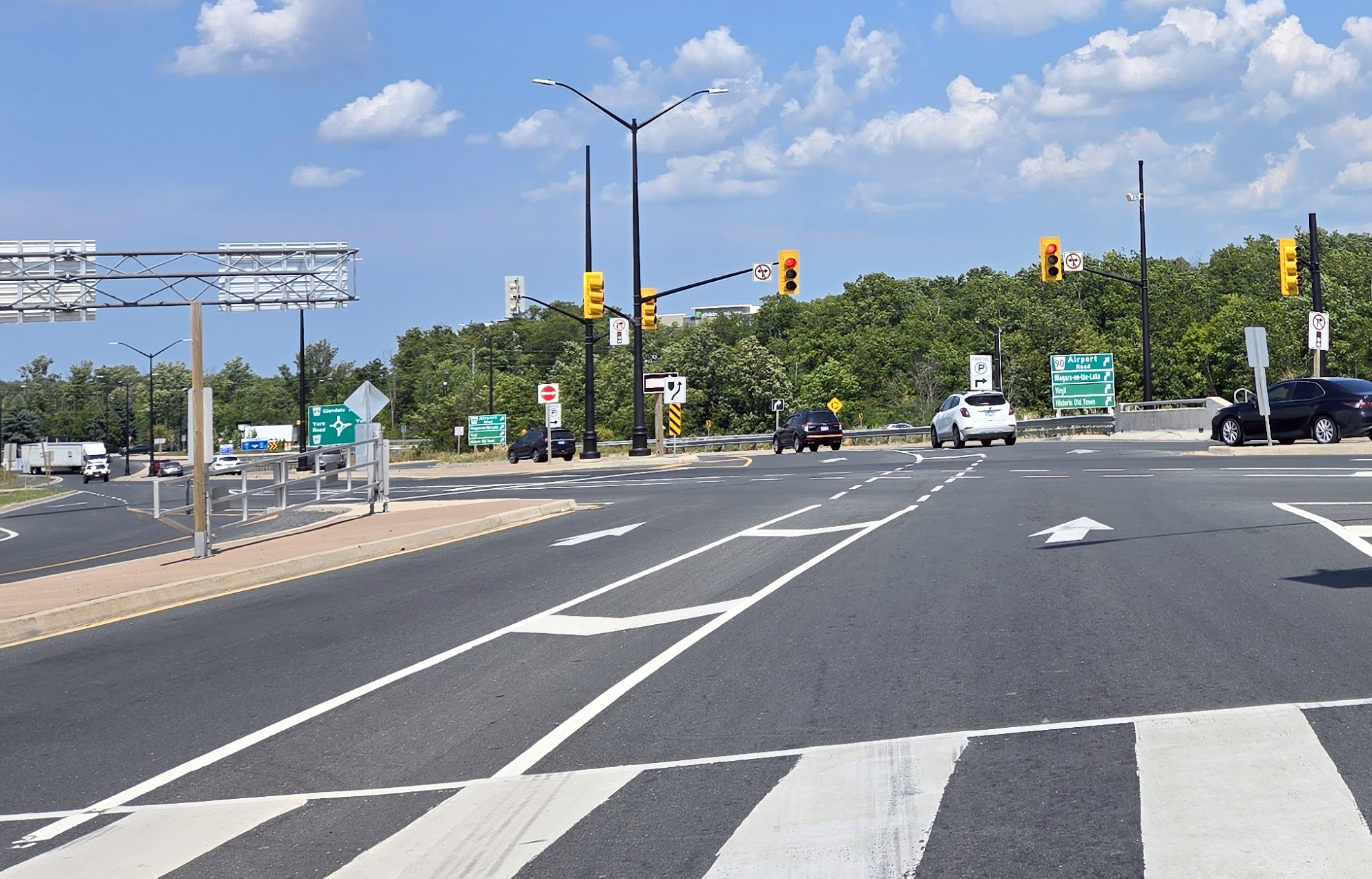
Diverging diamond interchange on Queen Elizabeth Way in Niagara-on-the-Lake, Ontario, Canada

As of October 14, 2022, over 170 DDIs were operational across the world including:

- Two in Australia, with more planned
- 1 in Belgium
- 3 in Canada
- 1 in Denmark, opened September 17, 2017
- 2 in France, built in 1970s
- 8 in Malaysia
- 2 in Saudi Arabia
- 2 in South Africa
- 1 in the United Arab Emirates
- 1 in Costa Rica
- >150 in the United States, with ~80 more under construction
- 1 in Turkey

== Advantages ==
Compared to a diamond interchange, the advantages of a diverging diamond interchange are:

- Two-phase signals with short cycle lengths, significantly reducing delay.
- Reduced horizontal curvature reduces the risk of off-road crashes.
- Increases the capacity of turning movements to and from the ramps.
- Potentially reduces the number of lanes on the crossroad, minimizing space consumption.
- Reduces the number of conflict points, thus theoretically improving safety.
- Increases the capacity by removing the need for turn lanes.
- Can cost significantly less than a traditional diamond interchange.

== Disadvantages ==
- Drivers may not be familiar with configuration, particularly with regard to merging maneuvers along the opposite side of the roadway or the crossover flow of traffic.
- Pedestrian (and other sidewalk-user) access requires at least four crosswalks (two to cross the two signalized lane crossover intersections, while two more cross the local road at each end of the interchange). This could be mitigated by signalizing all movements without impacting the two-phase nature of the interchange’s signals.
- Free-flowing traffic in both directions on the non-freeway road is impossible as the signals cannot be green for both directions simultaneously.
- Highway bus stops must be sited outside the interchange.
- Allowing exiting traffic to re-enter the through road in the same direction requires leaving the interchange on the local road and turning around, e.g., via a median U-turn crossover. This affects several use cases:
  - Drivers who take the wrong exit
  - Bypassing a crash at the bridge
  - Allowing an oversize load to bypass a low bridge
- Some factors make turning left onto a diverging diamond interchange from the highway ramp more hazardous: 1) There is a yield sign instead of a traffic light. 2) The driver can not see if the light for the through traffic is red or green. 3) The visible distance to see the oncoming through traffic from that vantage is very short. All of these combined results in the driver entering a potentially very busy interchange without sufficient information.

== Further considerations ==
- No standards currently exist for this design.
- The design depends on site-specific conditions.
- Additional signage, lighting, and pavement markings are needed beyond the levels for a standard diamond interchange.
- Local road should be a low-speed facility, preferably under 45 mph (72 km/h) posted speed on the crossroad approach. However, this may be mitigated by utilizing a higher design speed for the crossing movements.

== Double crossover merging interchange ==
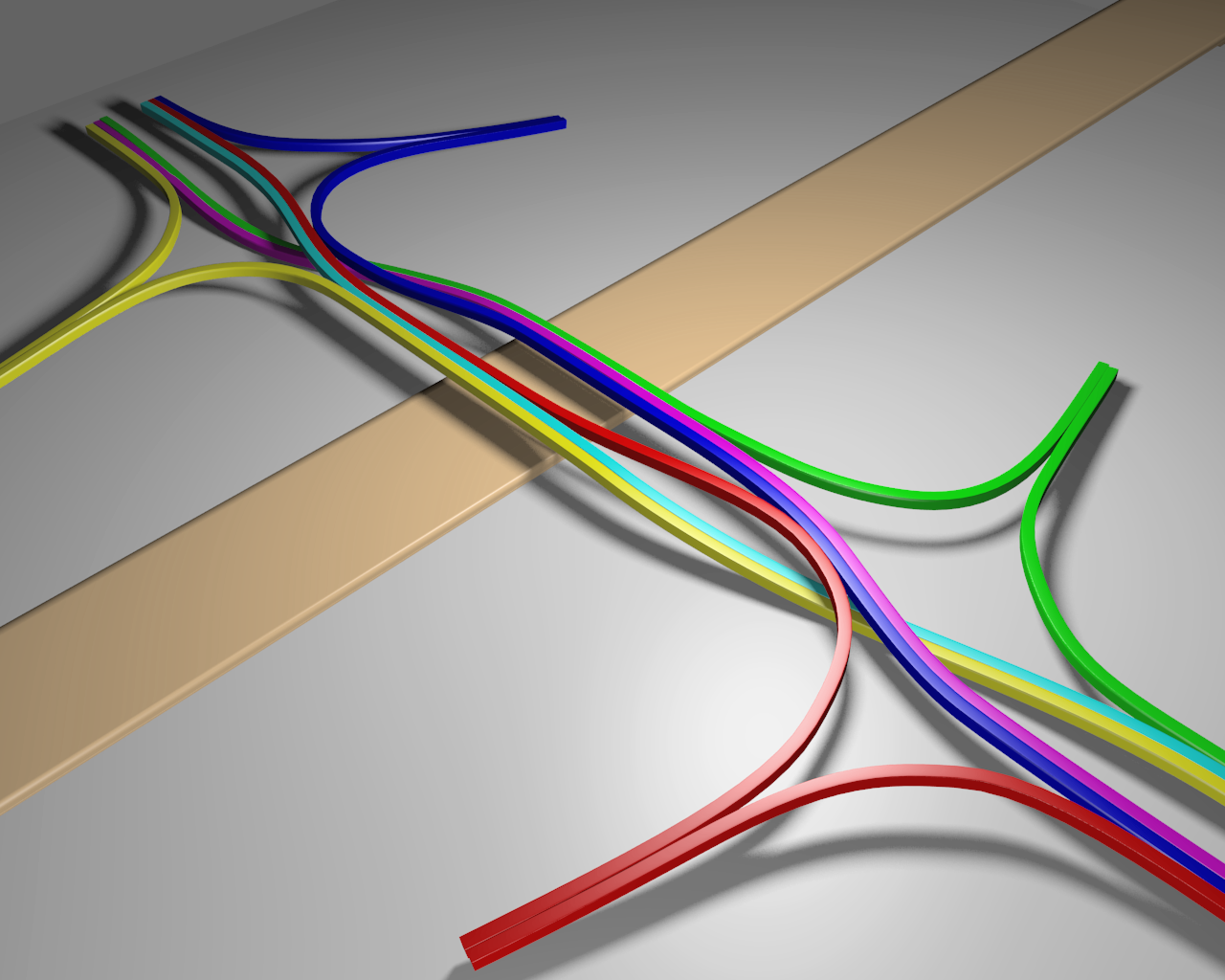
3D computer generated DCMI

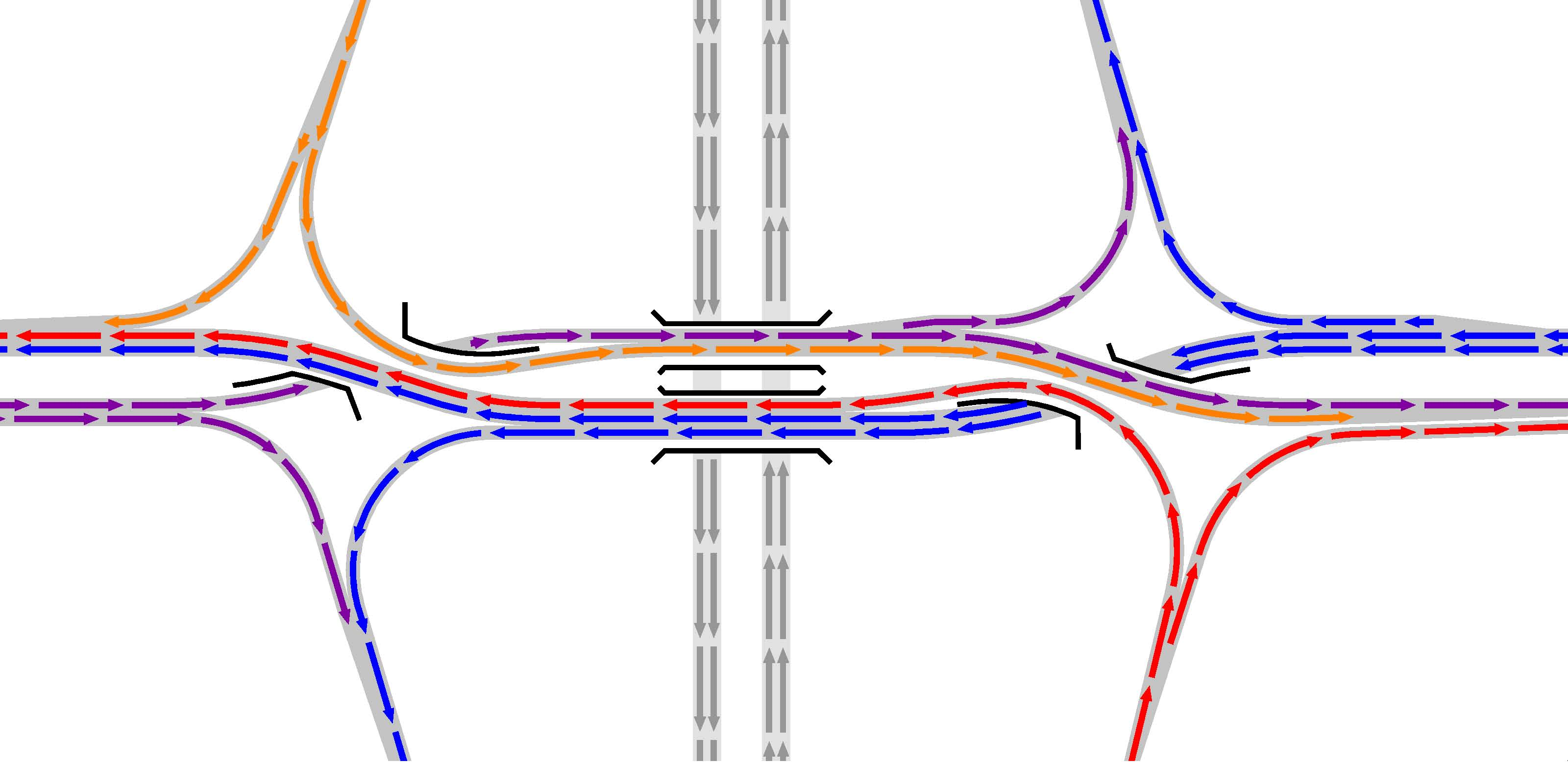
DCMI traffic flow patterns

A free-flowing interchange variant, patented in 2015, has received recent attention. Called the double crossover merging interchange (DCMI), it includes elements from the diverging diamond interchange, the tight diamond interchange, and the stack interchange. It eliminates the disadvantages of weaving and of merging into the outside lane from which the standard DDI variation suffers. A highway U-turn requires weaving, however.

A partial DCMI has existed at the I-45/SH 6/SH 146 interchange in Bayou Vista, Texas, since at least 1969. As of 2025, however, construction is underway to replace the DCMI as part of a widening project on I-45.

== Three-level diverging diamond interchange ==
Another variation of the diverging diamond was developed by the Arizona Department of Transportation (ADOT) as part of their I-10 widening/SR 210 extension project near Tucson, Arizona. The interchange (I-10 exit 270 at Kolb Road) will be reconfigured as a combination of both a diverging diamond and a three-level diamond interchange. The ramps (the top level/Kolb Road) would carry thru traffic while the diverging diamond (the second level/interchange) would be for traffic getting on or off the freeway (the third level/I-10).

== See also ==
- Hook turn
- Jughandle
- List of road interchanges in the United States
- Michigan left
- Single-point urban interchange (SPUI)
- Superstreet
