= Cloverleaf interchange =

Highway interchange using loop ramps

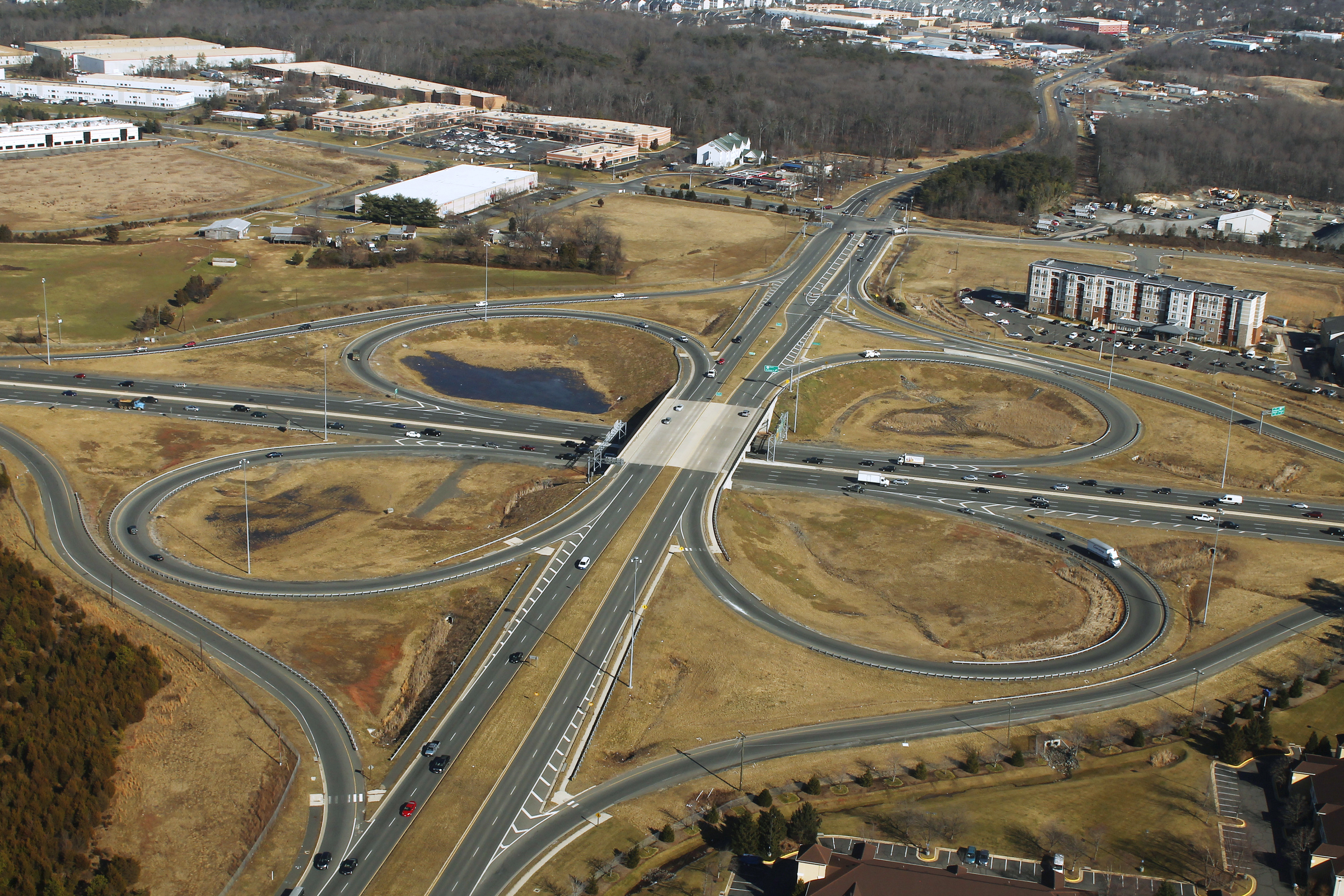
Cloverleaf interchange in Dulles, Virginia, United States facing east on SR 606 over SR 28

A cloverleaf with collector/distributor roads

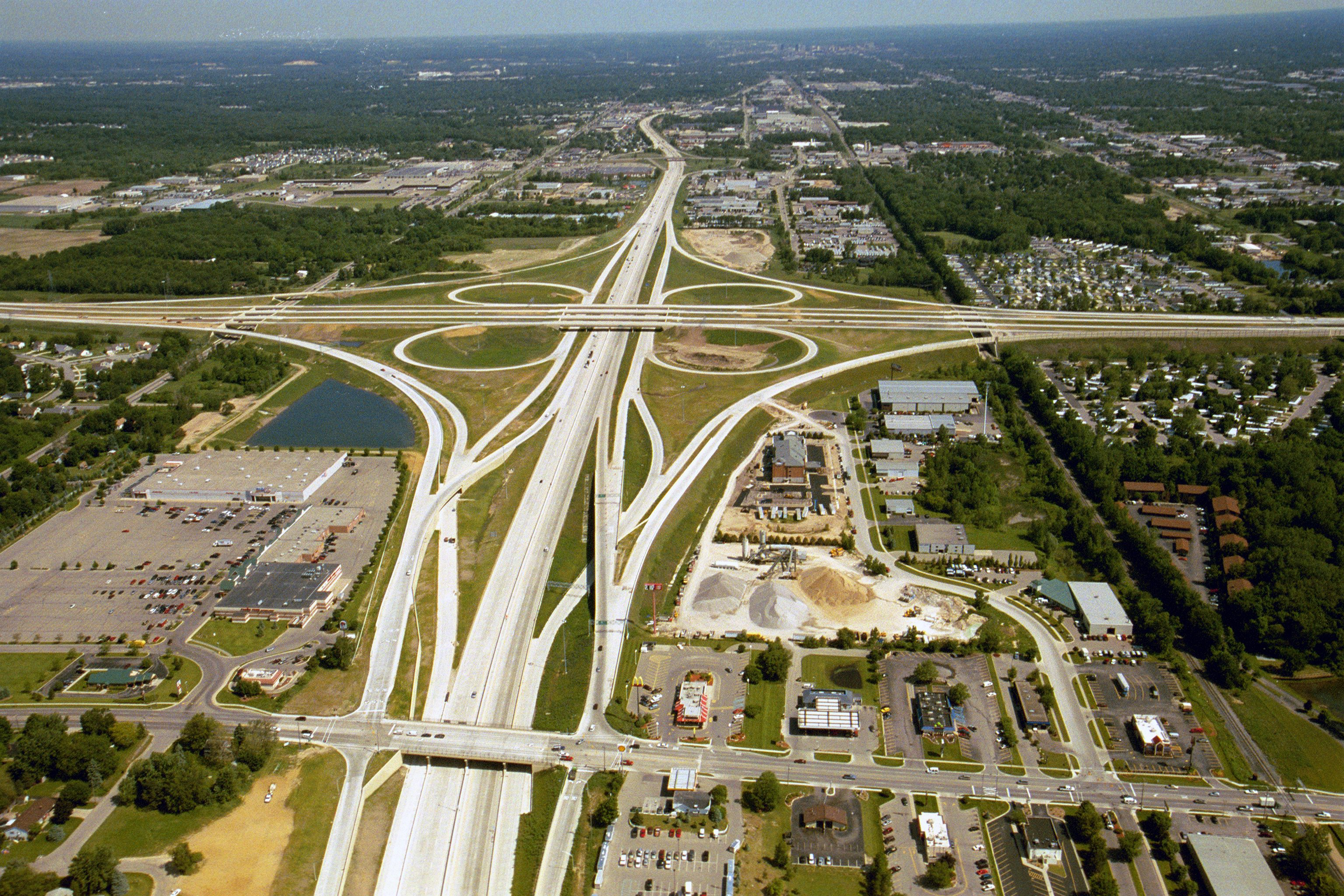
A typical cloverleaf interchange with collector/distributor roads in Cutlerville, Michigan, facing north on US 131 under M-6 (located at: 42.848912°N 85.678689°W)

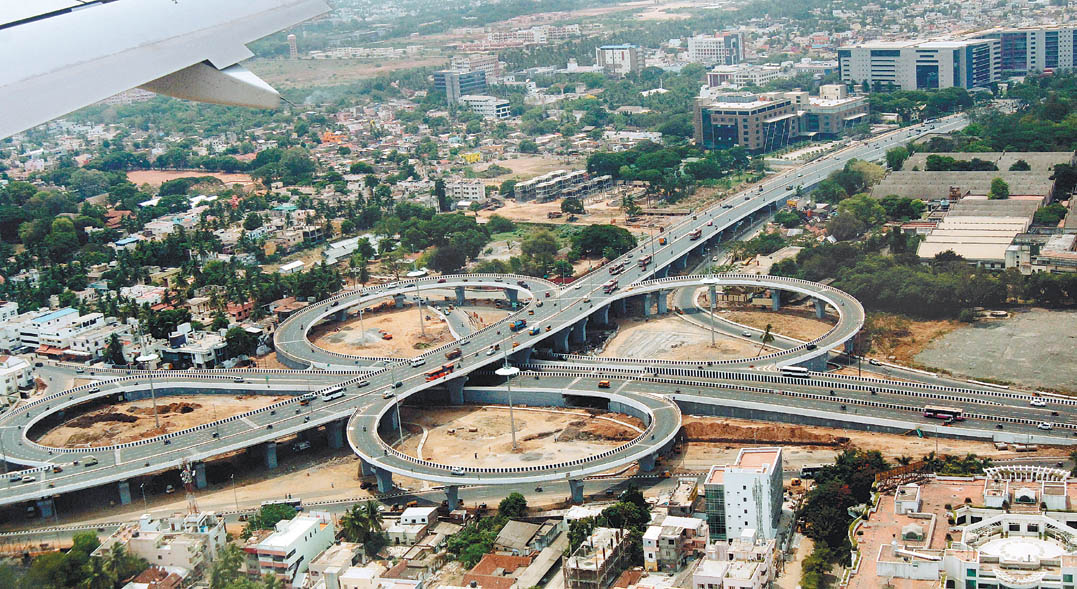
The Kathipara Cloverleaf interchange in Chennai, Tamil Nadu

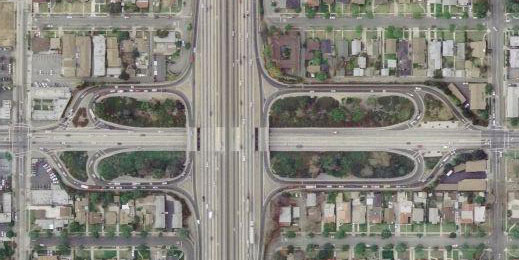
Many old cloverleaf interchanges elongate the ramps in the direction of the surface road. This one in Alhambra, California has been supplemented with collector/distributor roads, 34.071659°N 118.122938°W.

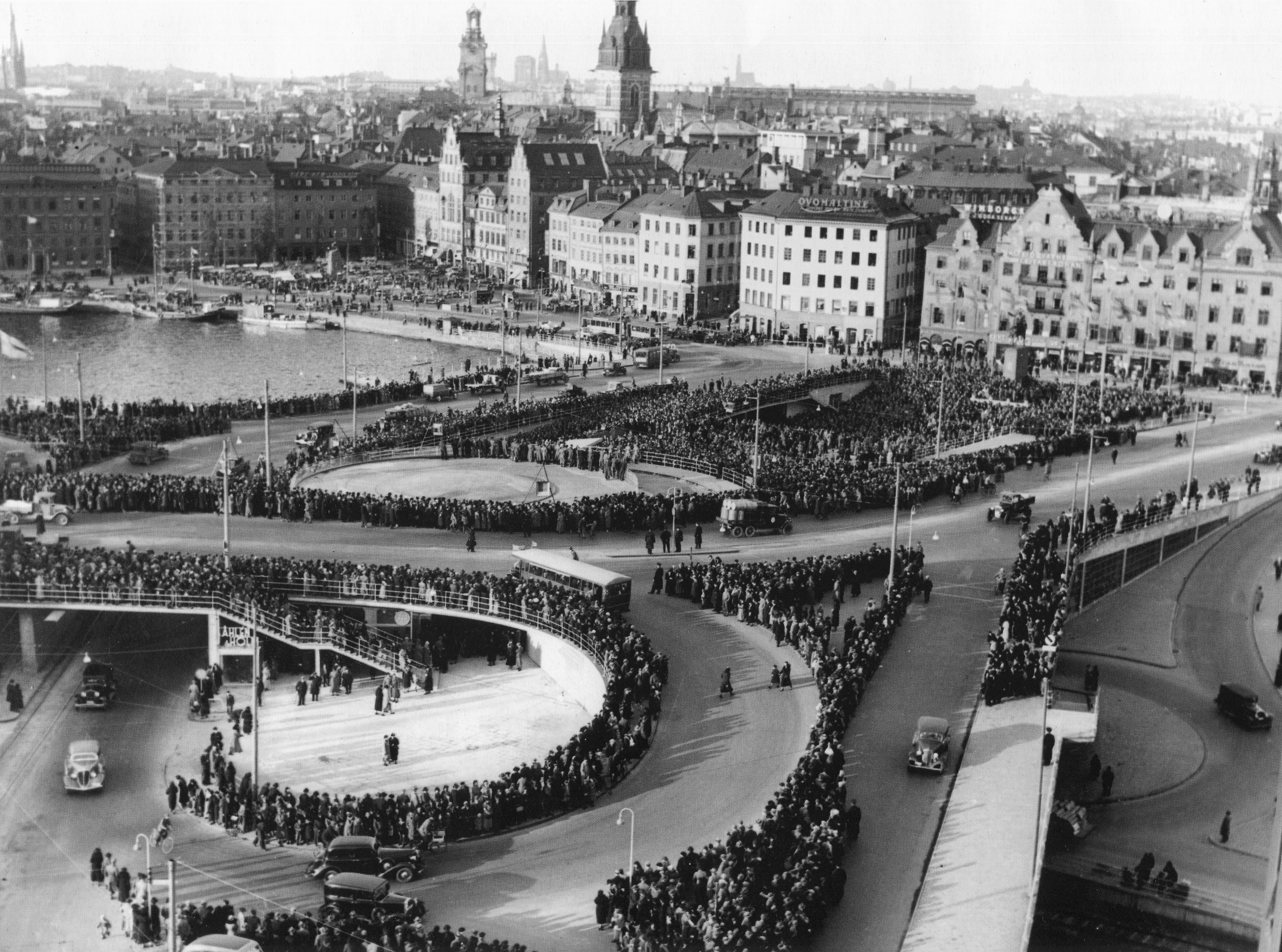
Opening Europe's first cloverleaf (October 1935) at Slussen, Stockholm, 59.32063°N 18.072501°E

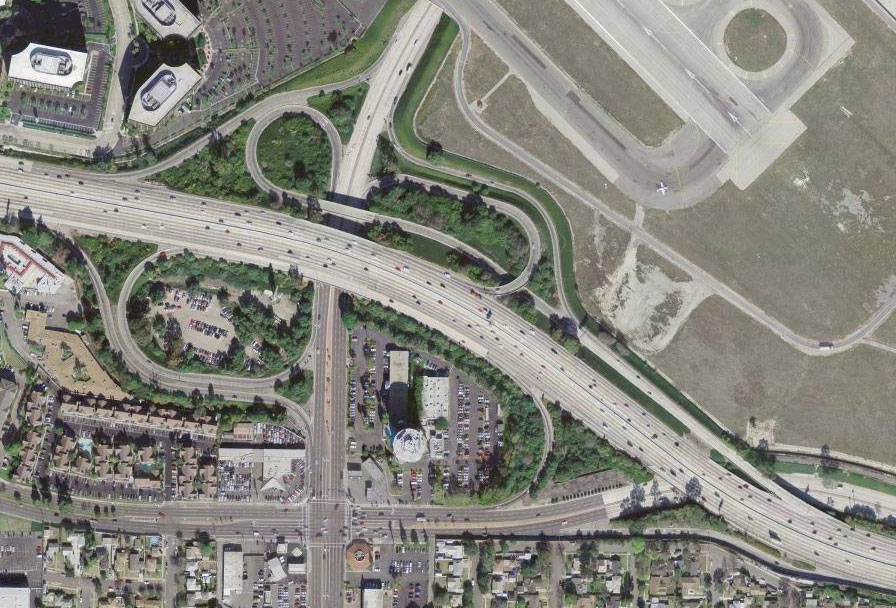
In this cloverleaf in Long Beach, California, two bridges are used to eliminate weaving among cars entering and exiting the westbound lane, facing north on SR 19 under I-405 (33.80595°N 118.142047°W).

A cloverleaf interchange is a two-level interchange in which all turns are handled by slip roads. To go left (in right-hand traffic; reverse directions in left-driving regions), vehicles first continue as one road passes over or under the other, then exit right onto a one-way three-quarter loop ramp (270°) and merge onto the intersecting road. The objective of a cloverleaf is to allow two highways to cross without the need for any traffic to be stopped by traffic lights. The limiting factor in the capacity of a cloverleaf interchange is traffic weaving.

== Overview ==
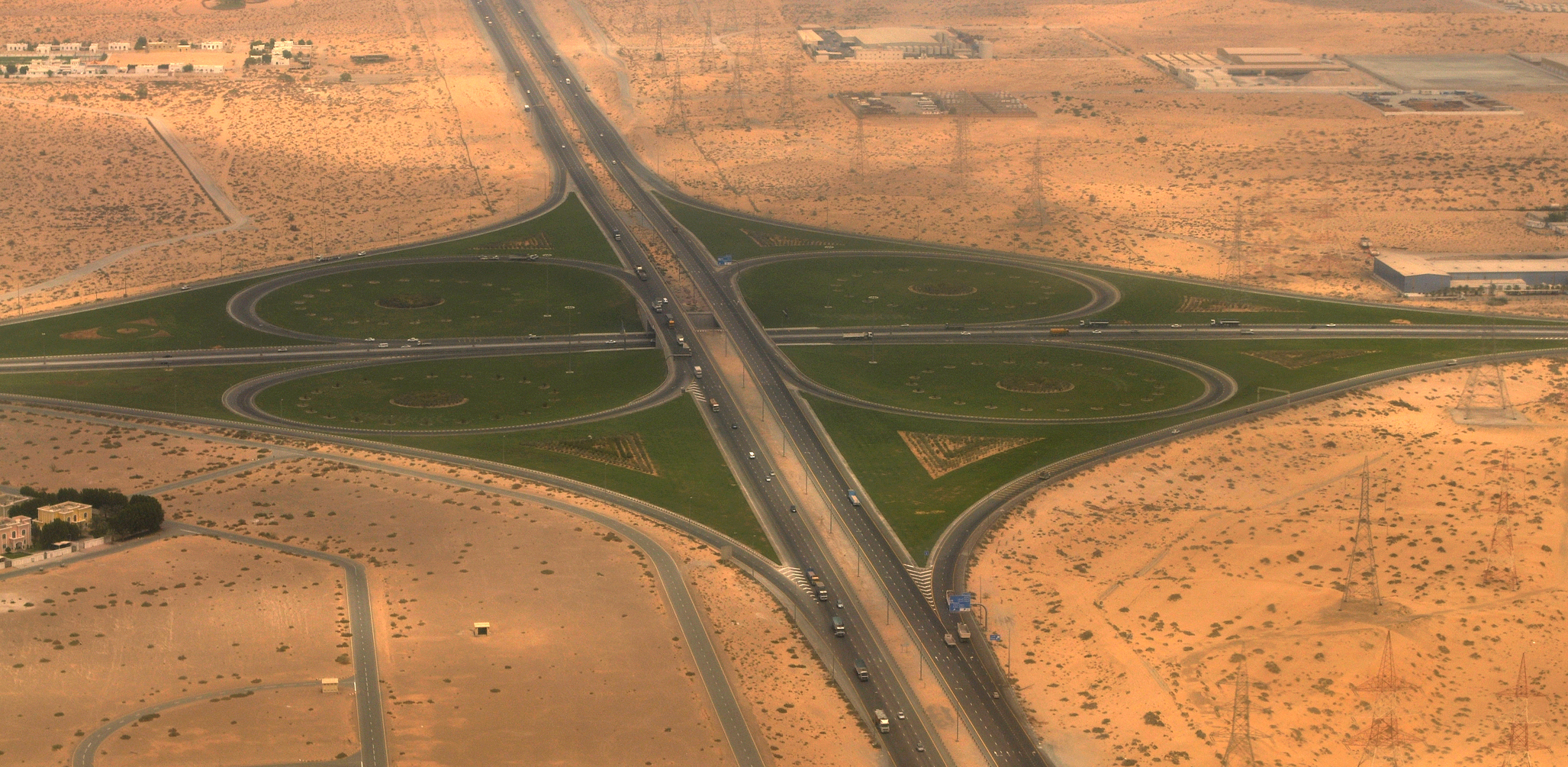
A cloverleaf interchange near Sharjah International Airport in the United Arab Emirates, 25.298611°N 55.593611°E

Cloverleaf interchanges, viewed from overhead or on maps, resemble the leaves of a four-leaf clover or less often a 3-leaf clover. In the United States, cloverleaf interchanges existed long before the Interstate system. They were originally created for busier interchanges that the original diamond interchange system could not handle. Their chief advantage was that they were free-flowing and did not require the use of such devices as traffic signals. This not only made them a viable option for interchanges between freeways (where such devices are typically not an option), but they could also be used for very busy arterials where signals could present congestion problems.

They are common in the United States and have been used for over 40 years as the Interstate Highway System expanded rapidly. One problem is that, frequently, large trucks exceeding the area speed limit roll over. Another problem is the merging of traffic (see below). For these reasons, cloverleaf interchanges have become a common point of traffic congestion at busy junctions.

At-grade cloverleaf configurations with full four leaves and full outside slip ramps are extremely rare, though one exists in Toms River, New Jersey. Any other intersection with merely one, two, or three leaf ramps with outer ramps would not be designated a "cloverleaf" and simply be referred to as a jughandle or parclo intersection.

== History ==
=== Background ===
The first cloverleaf interchange patented in the US was by Arthur Hale, a civil engineer in Maryland, on February 29, 1916.

A modified cloverleaf, with the adjacent ramps joined into a single two-way road, was planned in 1927 for the interchange between Lake Shore Drive (US 41) and Irving Park Road (IL 19) in Chicago, Illinois, but a diamond interchange was built instead.

=== Beginning ===
The first cloverleaf interchange built in the United States was the Woodbridge Cloverleaf at intersection of the Lincoln Highway (Route 25) and Amboy—now St. Georges—Avenue (Route 4) (now U.S. 1/9 and Route 35) in Woodbridge Township, New Jersey. It opened in 1929, although it has since been replaced with a partial cloverleaf interchange. Before the cloverleaf was replaced in the late 2000s, it was judged eligible for inclusion in the National Register of Historic Places. Because of this, a commemorative film was made of the cloverleaf. The original cloverleaf interchange design was adapted by the Rudolph and Delano building firm from Philadelphia, from a photo Delano saw on a magazine cover about a highway in Buenos Aires, Argentina. The original inventor is unknown.

The first cloverleaf west of the Mississippi River opened on August 20, 1931, at Watson Road and Lindbergh Boulevard near St. Louis, Missouri, as part of an upgrade of U.S. 66.

The first cloverleaf interchange in Canada opened in 1937 at the junction of the Queen Elizabeth Way (QEW) and Provincial Highway 10 in Port Credit, Ontario (now a part of Mississauga, Ontario). As originally built, Highway 10 passed over the QEW. In 1962, the interchange was rebuilt with sub-collector roads along the QEW, and the orientation was also changed so that Highway 10 then passed under the QEW. The interchange was further modified between 2008 and 2010 by removing all but one loop ramp, creating a partial cloverleaf/diamond hybrid.

The cloverleaf was patented in Europe in Switzerland on October 15, 1928. The first cloverleaf in Europe opened in October 1935 at Slussen in central Stockholm, Sweden, followed in 1936 by Schkeuditzer Kreuz near Leipzig, Germany. This is now the interchange between the A 9 and A 14, and has a single flyover from the westbound A 14 to the southbound A 9. Kamener Kreuz was the first in continental Europe to open fully in 1937, at A 1 and A 2 near Dortmund, Germany.

== Problems ==
The primary drawback of the classic design of the cloverleaf is that vehicles merge onto the highway at the end of a loop immediately before other vehicles leave to go around another loop, creating conflict known as weaving. Weaving limits the number of lanes of turning traffic. Most road authorities have since been implementing new interchange designs with less-curved exit ramps that do not result in weaving. These interchanges include the diamond, parclo and single-point urban interchanges (SPUI) when connecting to an arterial road in non free-flowing traffic on the crossroad and the stack or clover and stack hybrids when connecting to another freeway or to a busy arterial in free-flowing traffic where signals are still not desired.

Not only are these ideas true for new interchanges, but they also hold when existing cloverleaf interchanges are upgraded. In Norfolk, Virginia, the interchange between US 13 and US 58 was originally a cloverleaf—it has since been converted to a SPUI. Also, many cloverleaf interchanges on California freeways, such as U.S. 101, are being converted to parclos. In Hampton, Virginia, a cloverleaf interchange between Interstate 64 and Mercury Boulevard has been partially unwound into a partial stack interchange. During 2008 and 2009, four cloverleaf interchanges along I-64/US 40 in St. Louis, Missouri, were replaced with SPUIs as part of a major highway-renovation project to upgrade the highway to Interstate standards. The original cloverleaf interchange in Delmont, Pennsylvania between Routes 22 and 66 was also converted to a SPUI.

A compromise is to add a collector/distributor road next to the freeway; this does not eliminate weaving but moves it off the main lanes of the freeway. An example of this is the State Highway 23/Interstate 43 interchange in Sheboygan, Wisconsin, where the exit/entrance roads on and off Highway 23 are two lanes next to the main I-43 freeway on the north and southbound sides of the road.

A few cloverleaf interchanges in California have been rebuilt to eliminate weaving on the freeway while keeping all four loop ramps, by adding bridges, similar to braided ramps.

Several cloverleaf interchanges have been eliminated by adding traffic lights on the non-freeway route. Sometimes, this is even done at the intersection of two freeways, particularly when one freeway terminates at an interchange with another. An example of this is in Lakewood, Washington, at the interchange between Interstate 5 and Washington State Route 512, where a visible ramp stub shows that one of the four leaves was removed, thus eliminating weave on I-5. In the future, the traffic signal will be replaced by a two-lane flyover, completing the freeway-to-freeway interchange once again. Cloverleaf interchanges also tend to occupy much more land than any other kind of interchange.

Numerous cloverleaf intersections in the Lower Mainland of British Columbia, Canada, require the merging of traffic from the clover directly onto the collector/distributor lane. This requires the slowly moving driver coming around the loop ramp to merge with the quickly moving driver exiting on the collector/distributor lane with no opportunity to accelerate to match the flow of the oncoming driver. This speed differential in merging can be as great as 65 km/h (approx. 43 mph).

The cloverleaf interchange was not implemented in great numbers in the United Kingdom, because of these performance problems. There were originally three, one in Redditch and two in Livingston. One of the Livingston examples was remodeled in the mid-2000s as part of a public transport project. The Girton interchange near Cambridge was a "half"-cloverleaf interchange that regularly experienced peak-time congestion due to A14 westbound traffic weaving with M11 traffic. This interchange was redesigned in 2019 to remove one of the loops. In Ireland, partial cloverleaf set-ups exist at the interchanges of the main roads out of Dublin and the M50, allowing free-flow movements in all directions. The Red Cow Interchange is an example.

Most cloverleaf interchanges have been phased out in Ontario, but some close variants do remain with similar traffic flows. The main difference however is that adjacent on and off ramps are shared together by single bidirectional carriageways. Examples include the Highway 62 and Highway 401 interchange in Belleville, Ontario, the Highway 4 and Highway 401 in London, Ontario, as well as the Lawrence Avenue and Don Valley Parkway interchange in Toronto. The Don Mills Road and Don Valley Parkway and the Highway 27 and Dixon Road are also other examples; however, one quadrant of each has a loop missing.

== See also ==
Comparison of traffic flows for some four-legged complete interchanges (animation)

- Partial cloverleaf interchange
- Stack interchange
- Continuous-flow intersection
- Diverging diamond interchange
