= Bundesstraße 528 =

Federal highway in Germany

B 528
- Bundesstraße 528
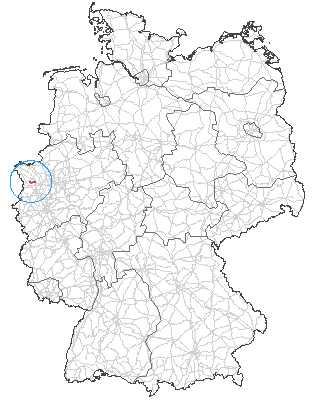

Route information
- Length: 6.3 km (3.9 mi)

Location
- Country: Germany
- States: North Rhine-Westphalia

Highway system
- Roads in Germany; Autobahns; List; Federal; List; State; E-roads

The Bundesstraße 528 is a short federal highway in Germany. It is located entirely within the state of North Rhine-Westphalia.

== Route ==
The Bundesstraße 528 forms the southern bypass of Kamp-Lintfort, which had already been foreseen in the federal traffic route plan for quite some time. The construction work has been completed. The first part of the B 528 between the L 476 "Friedrich-Heinrich-Allee" and the motorway junction Kamp-Lintfort (A 57 / A 42) was released for traffic on 19 December 2006. The second section between the L 476 and the B 510 in the west of Kamp-Lintfort is currently under construction.

At the moment, the addition of a direct exit to the logistics center "logport IV", which is to be built by logport ruhr GmbH, is imminent. The railway connection there will be kept and will be used as a connection to the areas of the Duisburg Harbor (logport I to III).
