= European route E31 =

Road in trans-European E-road network

E31

Route information
- Length: 538 km (334 mi)

Major junctions
- North end: Rotterdam, Netherlands
- South end: Hockenheim, Germany

Location
- Countries: Netherlands; Germany

Highway system
- International E-road network; A Class; B Class

European route E31 is an international Class-A road in Europe, part of the United Nations E-road network. It has a north–south reference, running from Rotterdam, Netherlands to Ludwigshafen, Germany.

Firstly, it leaves Rotterdam, where it links to the E19 and E25 roads. It heads roughly east through the Netherlands, passing through Gorinchem (where it connects to the E311), and Nijmegen before crossing the border into Germany.

It passes first through Goch and Krefeld in North Rhine-Westphalia and heads southwards before entering Cologne, where it links with four other E-roads: the E29, E35, E37, and E40. It then continues south, going through Koblenz (where it connects to the E44), and then on to Bingen am Rhein, where it makes its final connection, to the E42. It then reaches its final destination of Hockenheim, where the E31 connects with the E50.

Its total length is 538 km (334 mi).

The route from Parma to La Spezia in Italy, although identified as E33 in the E-network, is also signposted as E31.
