= Dual carriageway =

Type of road

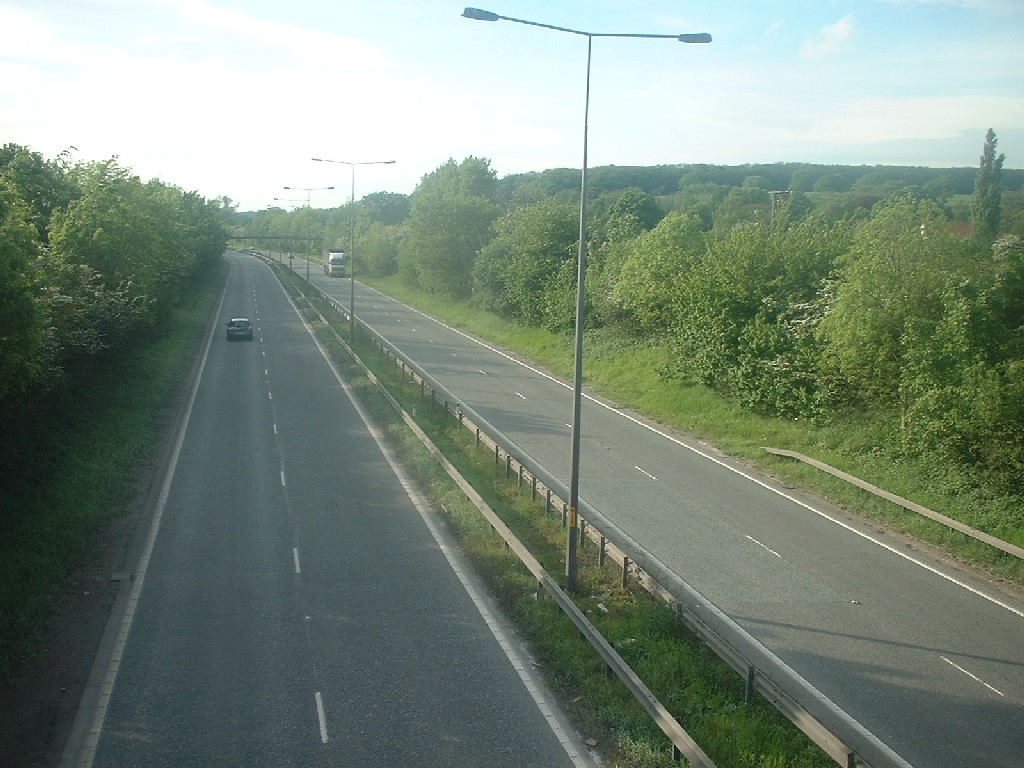
A typical British dual carriageway with central barrier on the A63 near Hull, England

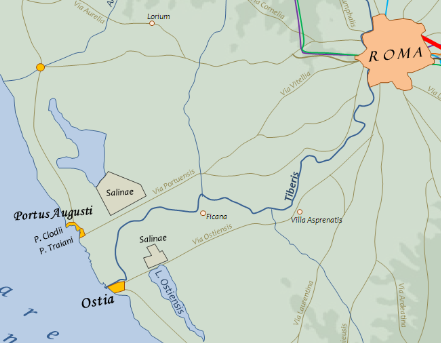
Map by Cassius Ahenobarbus, zoomed in to show the Via Portuensis, with the dual carriageway splitting close to the city of Rome. This is a very early (perhaps the first) example of a dual carriageway.

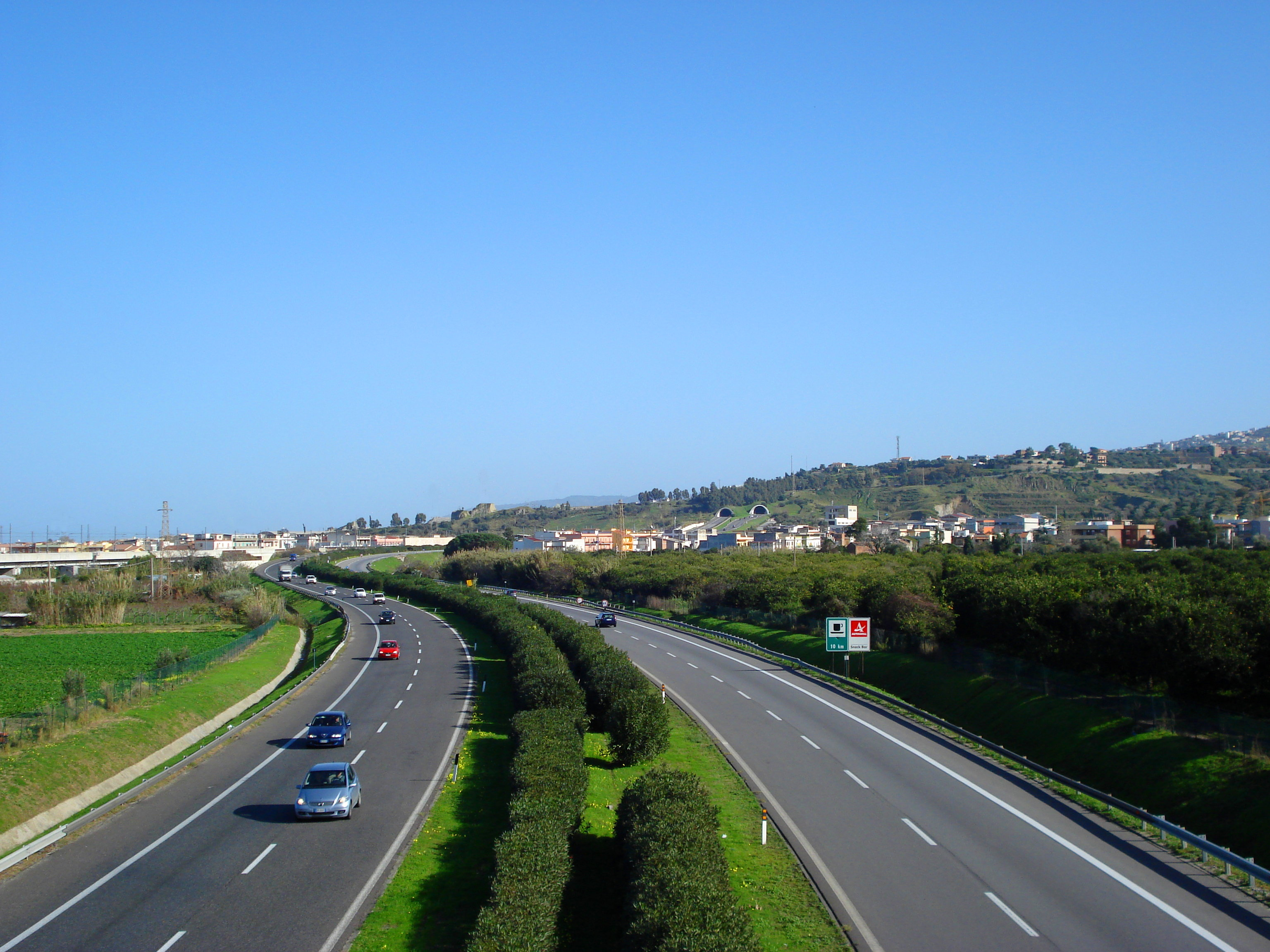
Autostrada A20 runs through the island of Sicily in Italy linking Palermo to Messina

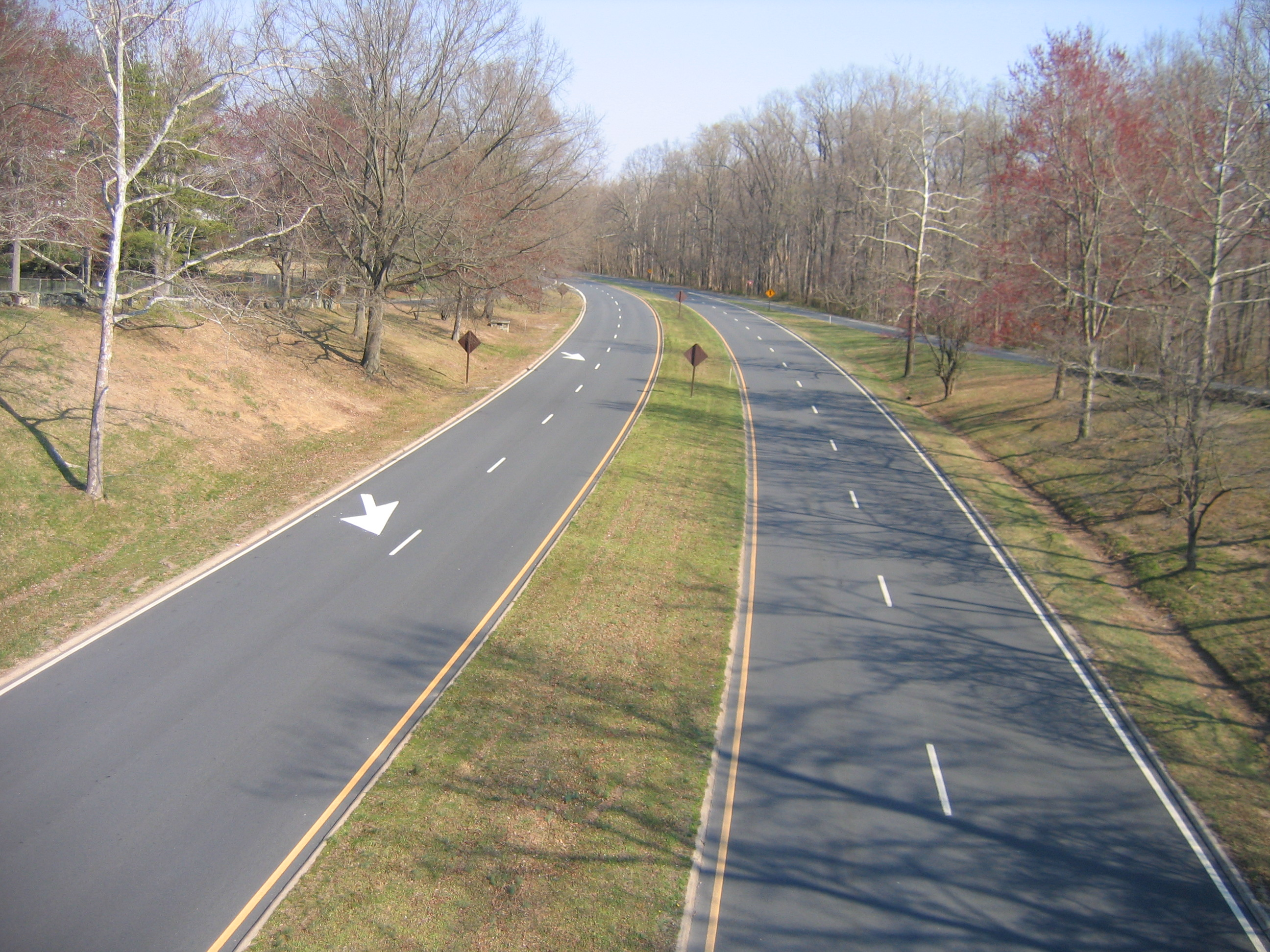
Clara Barton Parkway outside Washington, D.C.

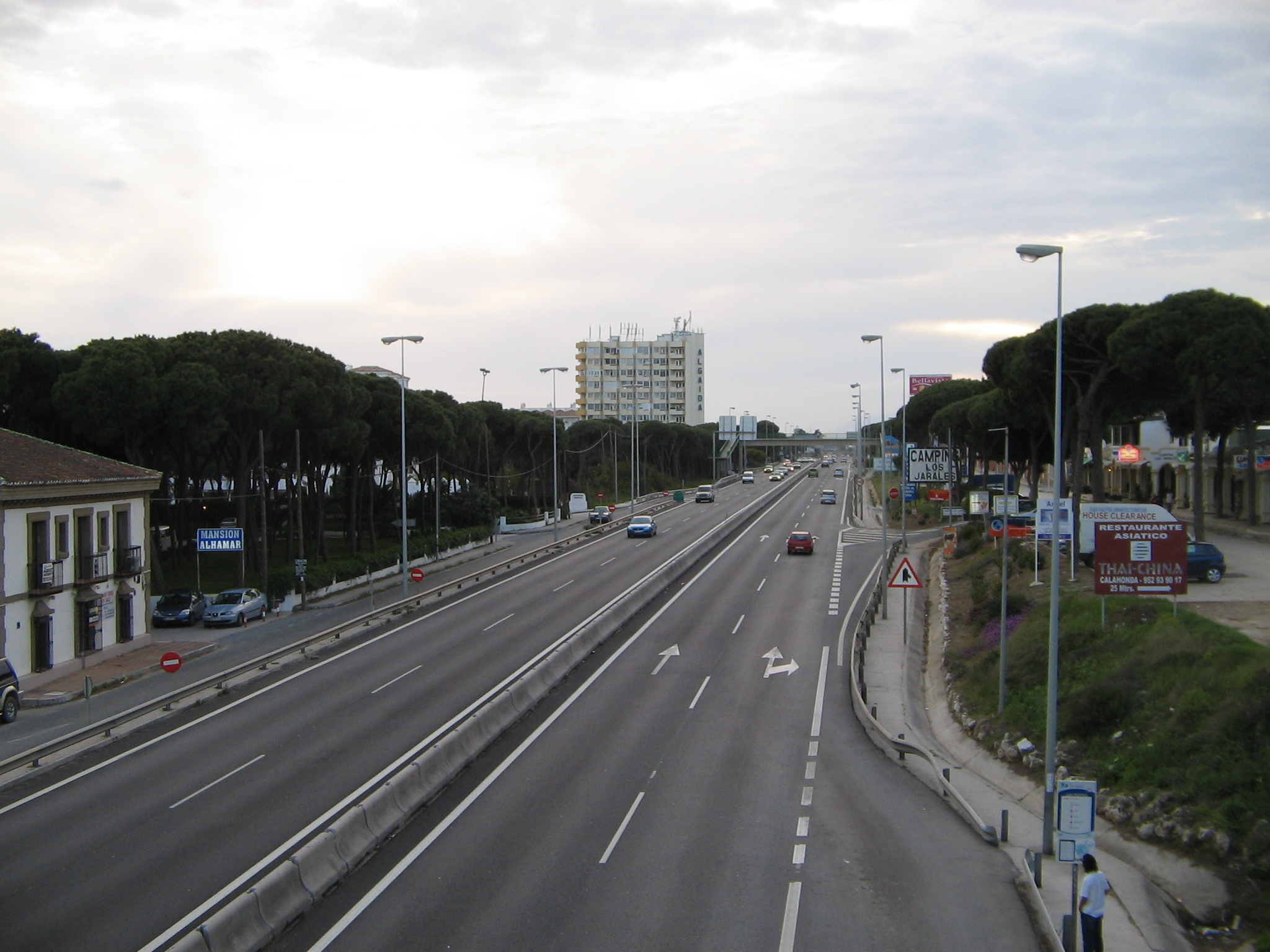
Jersey barriers may be used to separate the carriageways where the space is narrow. See this example near Málaga, Spain. There is also a bus stop in the bottom-right corner of the picture; it would not exist in a motorway.

A dual carriageway (BrE) or a divided highway (AmE) is a class of highway with carriageways for traffic travelling in opposite directions separated by a central reservation (BrE) or median strip (AmE). Roads with two or more carriageways which are designed to higher standards with controlled access are generally classed as motorways, freeways, etc., rather than dual carriageways.

A road without a central reservation is known as a single carriageway regardless of how many lanes there are. Dual carriageways have improved road traffic safety over the years and over single carriageways and typically have higher speed limits as a result. In some places, express lanes and local or collector lanes are used within a local-express-lane system to provide more capacity and to smooth out traffic flows for longer-distance travel.

== History ==
A very early (perhaps the first) example of a dual carriageway was the Via Portuensis, built in the first century by the Roman emperor Claudius between Rome and its harbor of Portus. The route between the city and the port experienced a great deal of commercial and pedestrian traffic, as Portus served as the primary avenue for the grain shipments of the Cura Annonae into Rome, as well as transporting the majority of goods imported from across the Mediterranean world. This influx of road activity necessitated the construction of a dual thoroughfare as the road approached the Porta Portese, the corresponding gate in the Aurelian Walls of Rome for the Via Portuensis.

One claim for the first divided highway in the United States was Savery Avenue in Carver, Massachusetts, first built in 1860, where the two roadways were separated by a narrow strip of trees down the middle. In 1907 the Long Island Motor Parkway opened, and roughly 20% of it featured a semi-dual-carriageway design. The New York City Belt Parkway system, which was built between 1907 and 1934, also pioneered the same design. However the majority of it featured concrete or brick railings as lane dividers instead of grass medians.

In the year of 1924 the first Italian autostrada was opened running 55 km (34 mi) from Milan to Varese. It featured a broad road bed and did not feature lane dividers except near cities and through the mountains.

The London end of the Great West Road became Britain's first dual carriageway when it was opened in 1925 by King George V.

In 1927 the Rome bypass was opened. It ran 92 km (57 mi) bypassing Rome to the east. Almost the entire length featured a dual-carriageway design. In the early 1930s, it was extended southward all the way to Naples and northward to Florence. Most of the original routing was destroyed by the Allies in World War II.

By 1930 several US and European cities had built dual-carriageway highways, mostly to control traffic jams and/or to provide bypass routes for traffic.

In 1932 the first German autobahn opened between Cologne and Bonn. It ran 21 km (13 mi) and became a precedent for future highways. Although it, like the first autostrada, did not feature a dual-carriageway design, it inspired the mass construction of future high-speed roadways.

During the 1930s, Germany, Italy, and the Soviet Union began construction of a network of dual carriageway expressways. By 1942, Germany had over 3,200 km (2,000 mi) of dual carriageway roads, Italy had nearly 1,300 km (810 mi), and the Soviet Union had 400 km (250 mi).

What may have been the world's first long-distance intercity dual carriageway/freeway was the Queen Elizabeth Way in Southern Ontario in Canada, initially linking the large cities of Toronto and Hamilton together by 1939, with construction on this stretch of the present-day Queen Elizabeth Way beginning in 1936 as "Middle Road". It was gradually upgraded to a freeway from the 1950s to 1970s.

Opened to traffic in 1940, the 160-mile-long (260 km) Pennsylvania Turnpike was the first rural dual carriageway built in the United States. By 1955 several states had built dual carriageway freeways and turnpikes and in 1957 the Interstate Highway System began. Completed in 1994, the major highway system links all the major cities of the United States.

== European implementations ==
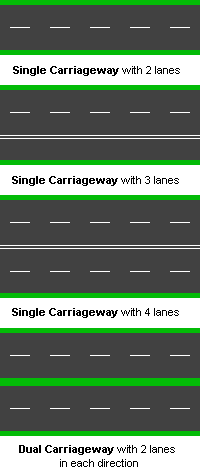
Diagram of types of road in the UK

=== United Kingdom ===
In the UK, although the term "dual carriageway" applies to any road with physically separated lanes, it is frequently used as a descriptive term for major routes built in this style. Such major dual carriageways usually have two lanes of traffic in each direction, with the lane nearest the centre being reserved for overtaking. Occasionally dual carriageways have only one lane in each direction, or more than two lanes each way (sometimes to permit easier overtaking of slower uphill traffic). Different speed limits apply on dual carriageway sections from those that apply on single carriageway sections of the same class of road, except in cities and built-up areas where the dual carriageway is more of a safety measure.

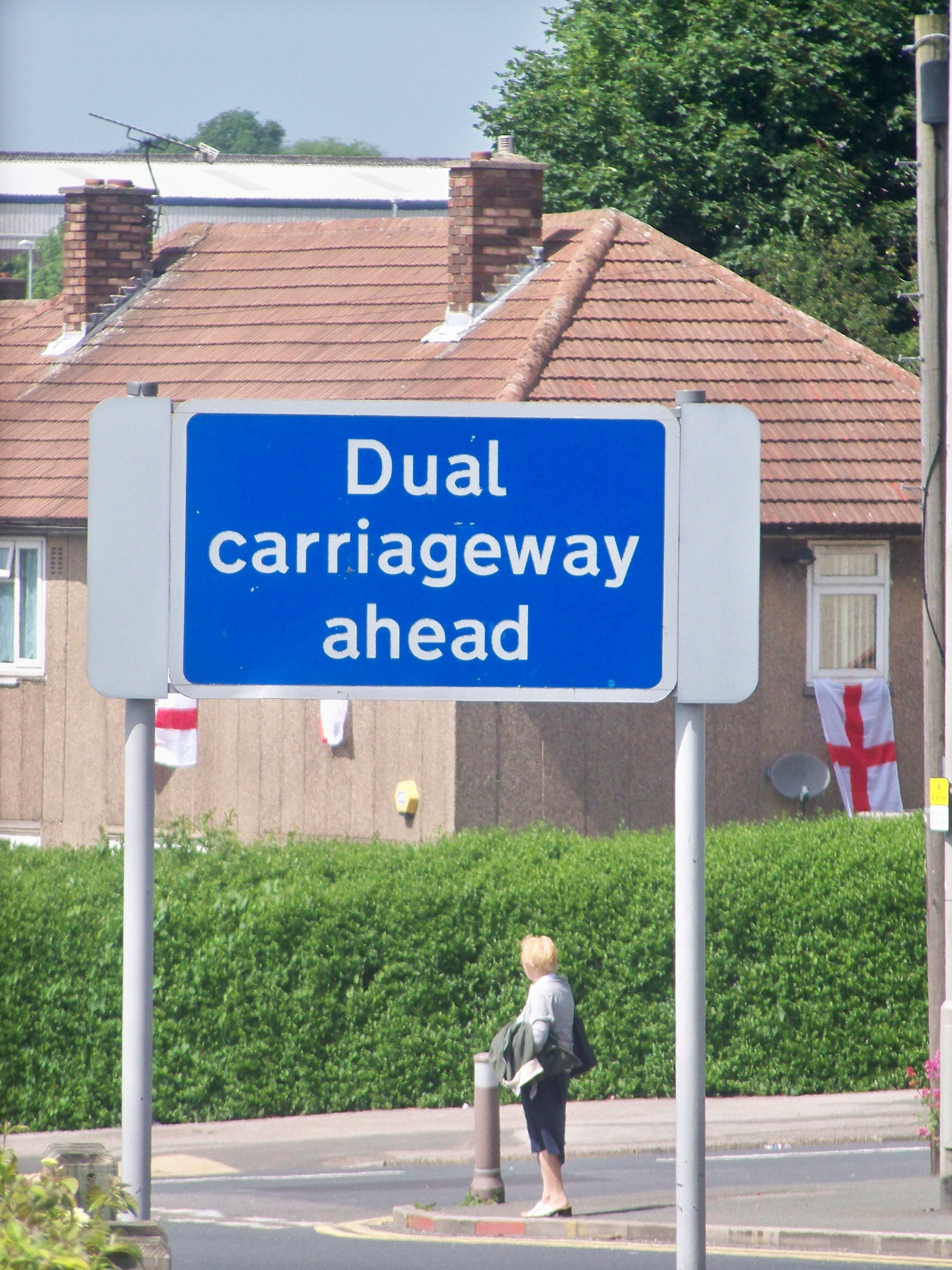
Sign informing motorists of an upcoming section of dual carriageway in Seacroft, Leeds

When first constructed, many dual carriageways—including the first motorways—had no crash- or other barriers in the central reservation. In the event of congestion, or if a driver missed their exit, some drivers made U-turns onto the opposite carriageway; many accidents were caused as a result of their misjudging the speed of approaching traffic on the other carriageway when doing so.

The majority of dual carriageway roads now have barriers. Some are heavy concrete obstructions which can bounce a vehicle back into the path of other traffic; others are made from steel ropes mounted on moderately weak posts, where the rope cuts into the vehicle body to slow the vehicle while keeping it against the barrier until it has stopped. Often on urban dual carriageways where the road has been converted from a four-lane single carriageway the central reservation will not be substantial: often just a small steel divider to save space.

Turning right (that is, across the line of traffic heading in the opposite direction) is usually permitted only at specific locations. Often the driver will be required to turn left (away from the dual carriageway) in order to loop around to an access road that permits crossing the major road. Roundabouts on dual carriageways are relatively common, especially in cities or where the cost of a grade-separated junction would be prohibitive. Where space is even more limited, intersections may be controlled by traffic lights. Smaller residential roads adjoining urban dual carriageways may be blocked off at one end to limit the number of junctions on the dual carriageway; often other roads will pass over or under the dual carriageway without an intersection.

A dual carriageway with grade-separated junctions and which meets other requirements may be upgraded to motorway standard, denoted by an (M) added after the road number (e.g. "A1(M)" or "A38(M)"). Unlike in Ireland, there was no official terminology for 'high-quality dual carriageways' until April 2015, when in England a new standard was set to designate certain high-quality routes formally as "Expressways". Many roads such as the A1, the A14, the A19 and the A42 are built to a high quality, with grade-separated junctions, full barriers at roadside and central reservations and, in some cases, three lanes of traffic. They may still fall short of motorway standard in terms of hard shoulders, the height of overpasses or the quality of intersecting junctions.

==== Speed limits ====
The national speed limit applies on dual carriageways (unless it is in a 'built-up area', or a lower limit is posted), which is as follows:

National speed limits on dual carriageways in the UK
Type of vehicle	Speed limit
Car, motorcycle or a car-based van up to 2 tonnes	70 mph (113 km/h)
Car with caravan or trailer	60 mph (97 km/h)
Bus or coach up to 12 m long	60 mph (97 km/h)
Goods vehicle up to 7.5 t	60 mph (97 km/h)
Goods vehicle over 7.5 t	60 mph (97 km/h) (England and Wales); 50 mph (80 km/h) (Scotland and Northern Ireland)

A dual carriageway in a built up area will have a statutory speed limit of 30 mph (48 km/h) unless otherwise sign-posted. It is common for such urban dual carriageways to have an increased speed limit of 40 mph (64 km/h). A road deemed to be in a built up area is indicated by the presence of street lights; on lit dual carriageways that are not considered to be in a built-up area, the speed limit will be clarified with intermittent signs.

=== Ireland ===
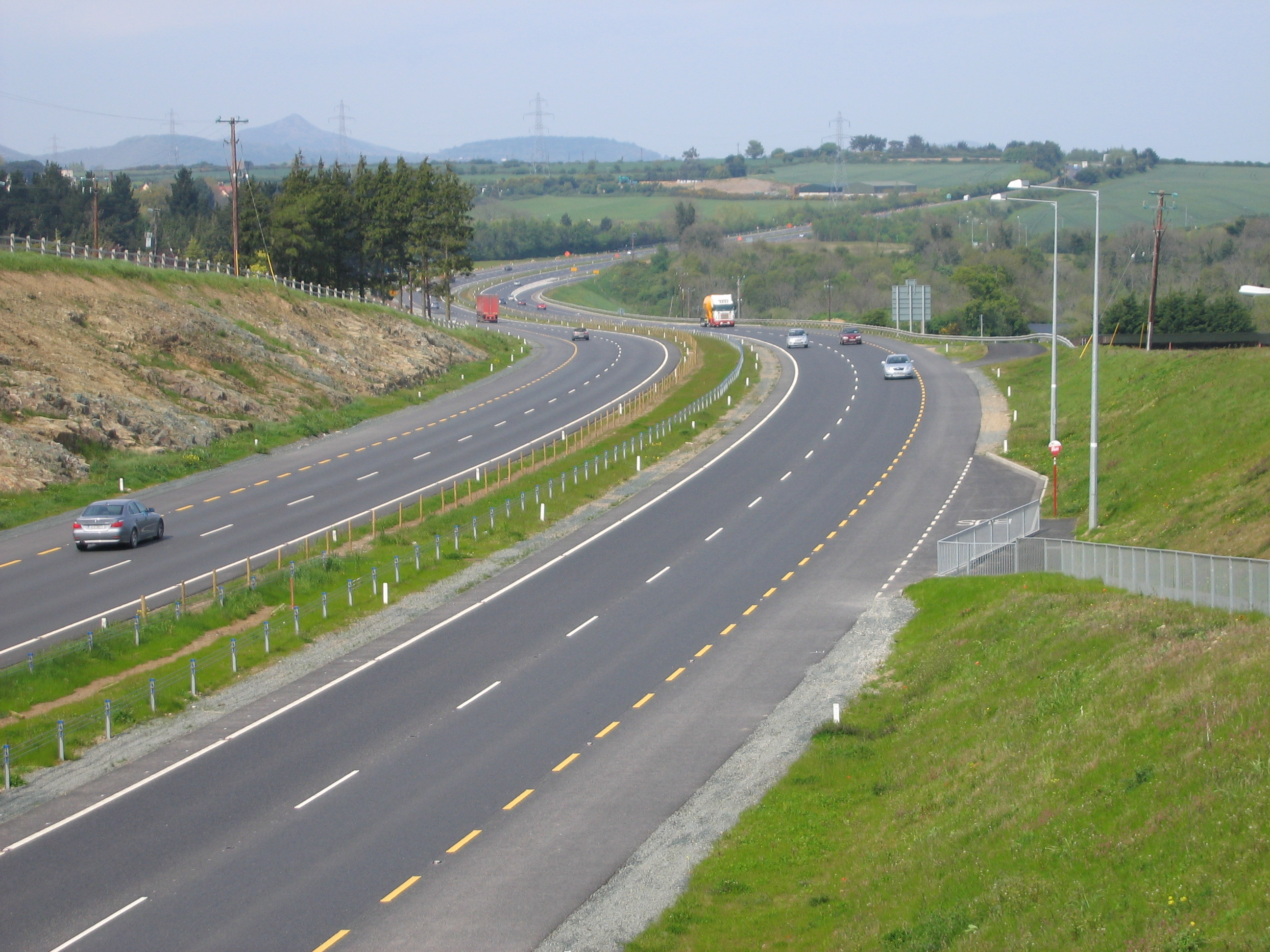
A typical modern Irish dual carriageway (opened 2004) along the N11, south of Newtownmountkennedy. On motorways, the yellow hard shoulder markings are unbroken.

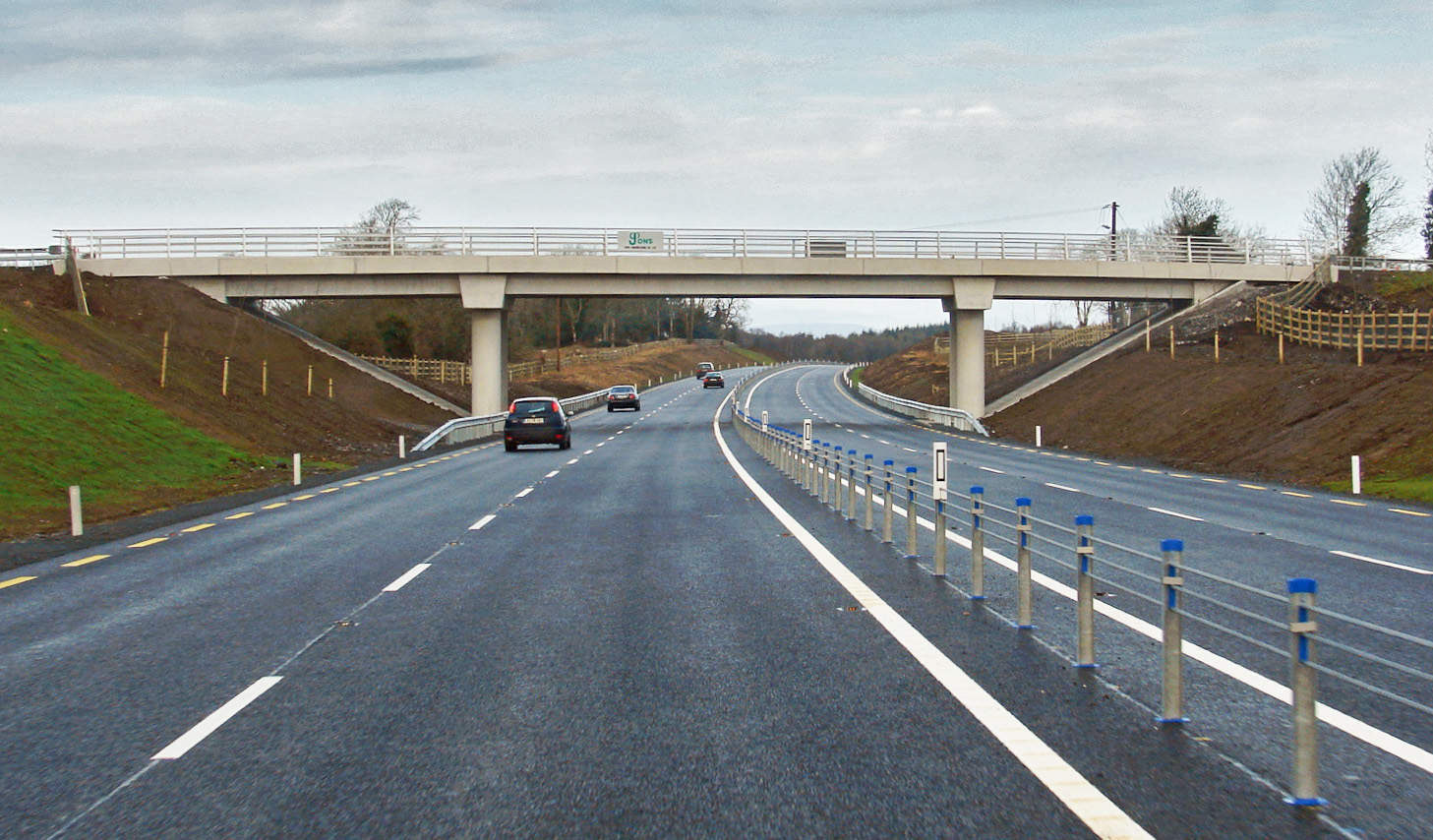
An example of a 2+2 dual-carriageway in Ireland. This type is similar to many found in the UK.

Although in Ireland the term dual carriageway technically applies to any road with physically separated lanes, it is usually used only to refer to those route sections that do not have a motorway designation. Most often it is national roads (roads with a route number prefix of N; e.g. N8) that are built as or upgraded to dual carriageway. A number of non-national roads (for example, regional roads) are dual carriageway, for example in urban areas near or in cities, or where the road was part of a national route.

Dual carriageways of this class differ from motorways in a number of ways. The hard shoulder is demarcated with a dashed yellow line (as opposed to an unbroken yellow line on motorways). The standard speed limit of 100 km/h (62 mph) for national routes usually applies (by default the limit is 80 km/h (50 mph) for non-national roads, even if dual carriageway). Local authorities have the power to apply a limit of up to 120 km/h (75 mph) as used on most motorways (The High Quality Dual Carriageway section of the N1 between the end of the M1 and the border with Northern Ireland and the N25/N22 Ballincollig Bypass in Cork are the only route sections with such special limits).

Traffic lights and junctions are permitted at grade on dual carriageways. For older sections of dual carriageway, this has resulted in fewer flyover junctions. Newer dual carriageway sections are usually near motorway standard, with grade-separated junctions, but may not be designated as motorways due to the need to preserve access to adjoining property or to the absence of a non-motorway alternative route. Also, dual carriageways that are not motorway classified do not need to be equipped with emergency phones.

Motorway restrictions only apply to motorway sections, rather than all dual carriageway sections of national roads (these are signposted with the N prefix on the route number, rather than M). Some national secondary roads, and regional roads in particular often have houses, schools and other developments fronting on to them. Less important national primary roads, and older sections not yet upgraded may also feature such developments built before the introduction of the Irish Planning system in 1964. Today Irish planning policy prohibits such development on National Primary or National Secondary roads where the speed limit exceeds 60 km/h (37 mph).

This policy results from concerns expressed by the National Roads Authority. A local authority is not obliged to implement this policy and can disregard this policy at its own discretion. This would usually only occur in exceptional circumstances or where planners are overruled by elected councillors using section 140 of the Local Government Act 2001. Accordingly, hard shoulders are included wherever feasible to provide for the resulting pedestrian and cyclist traffic, and are present on much of the national route network. These hard shoulders may also be used as running lanes by motorised traffic under certain conditions.

Until 2005, many motorways and dual carriageways in Ireland did not have crash barriers in the central reservation, the policy being to use a wider median instead. Crash barriers are now mandatory for such routes, and wire cabling or full crash barriers (depending on whether or not the route is a motorway, and median width) have been fitted to existing routes.

Between 2000 and 2010, three major types of dual carriageway were built on national road schemes in Ireland:

- High Quality Dual Carriageways (HQDC) – these were built mainly on the major inter-urban routes, to full motorway standard but without motorway regulations. The Roads Act, 2007 allows for these roads to be redesignated as motorways by ministerial order. Many of the sections of HQDC on the major inter-urban routes have been redesignated as motorways and full motorway regulations were applied when the redesignations came into effect.
- Standard dual carriageway of the traditional type was mainly used for schemes on the N11 road, the N18 road and the N25 road. Plans for this type of dual carriageway on the N20 road have been superseded by newer plans to build a motorway, the M20, to replace most of this route. Traditionally this type of dual-carriageway had a mixture of at grade junctions (including roundabouts), grade separated junctions, and median crossings. Nowadays they are similar to HQDCs, but minor at grade exits—generally left turn only—are allowed and the design speed (by Irish standards) is only 100 km/h. Median crossings and roundabouts are no longer generally found on these schemes. An example of a standard dual carriageway scheme, opened in 2006, is the Ennis bypass although this road has grade separated junctions and no median crossings. This route was upgraded to motorway status in 2009.
- 2+2 roads—officially these roads are designated as Type 2 dual carriageways by the National Roads Authority (NRA). They were created by widening existing roads or building new roads, and have two lanes in each direction with a steel cable barrier in the middle but no hard shoulder. Most junctions are at-grade. With the exception of the restricted median width and the lack of lay-bys, this type of dual carriageway is similar to many dual carriageways found in the UK. The first 2+2 scheme was the N4 Dromod Roosky bypass, opened on 7 December 2007.
- 2+1 roads—officially these roads are designated as Type 3 dual carriageways by the NRA. They have two lanes in one direction and one lane in the other, alternating every few kilometres, and usually separated with a steel cable barrier. Sections of 2+1 road were built on the N20 and the N2. In July 2007, the NRA announced that it would no longer build 2+1 roads and 2+2 roads were built instead.

=== Germany ===
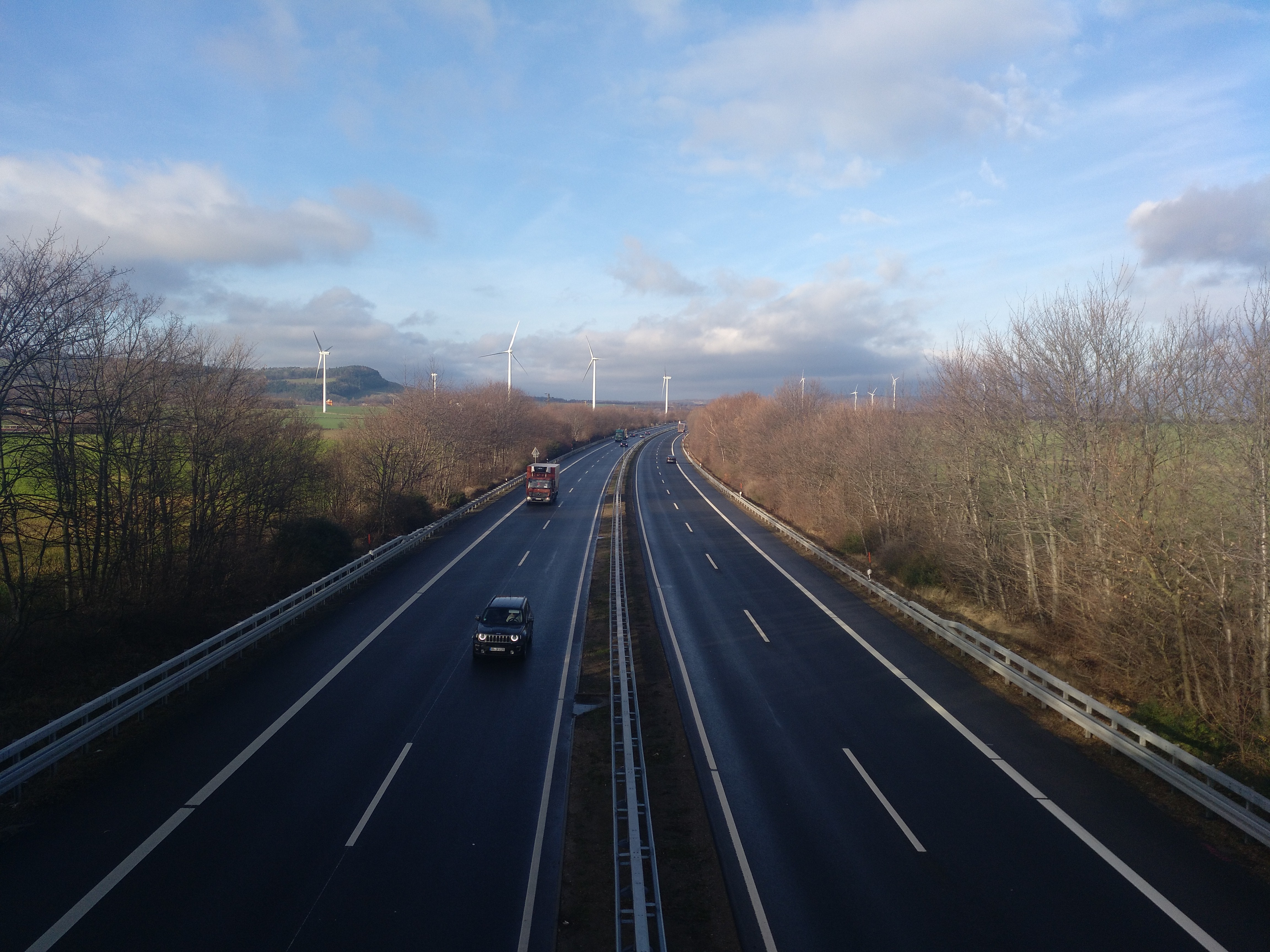
B6 near Harlingerode

In Germany the term Autobahnähnliche Straße (motorway-like road) refers to roads that are similar to German autobahn in grade-separation and signage. Most of them are designated as Kraftfahrstraßen (expressways), which means that the roads allow higher speed traffic than is common on other roads. This in turn requires them to have dual carriageways in most cases. An exception is the 2+1 road system in some rural areas; these roads are also referred to as expressways.

Autobahnähnliche Straßen mostly are colloquially referred to as gelbe Autobahn (yellow motorway) because they have the same technical standard as the Autobahn but have black on yellow signs instead of the white on blue signs used on the Autobahn motorway network. These are generally high-speed arterial roads in larger cities or important roads within a federal state that do not connect to major cities, so that they do not fall under the federal budget for the Autobahn network. The federal road Bundesstraße 27 is an example where about half of its length is upgraded to a high speed motorway standard. On the basis of their structure these roads have, comparable to the German autobahn, the legal foundation that no default speed limit exists (design speed 130 km/h), although the standard advisory speed limit (German: Richtgeschwindigkeit) still exists. Nevertheless, expressways are often given speed limit signs.

Exit signs.

At the moment some (blue) motorways have been taken out of the Autobahn network programme but still have the blue signs (e. g. the B 59, formerly A 540 near Grevenbroich); and on the other hand some former non-Autobahn (yellow) motorways have been added to Autobahn budgeting but the signs have not been changed either (e. g. parts of the B 6, now A 36 in the north of the Harz highland area in Saxony-Anhalt). Motorways that are neither in the autobahn network nor in the Bundesstraße network are given black on white signs, following the same sign code as high-speed dual carriageways—this is mostly seen on urban trunk roads.

=== Italy ===
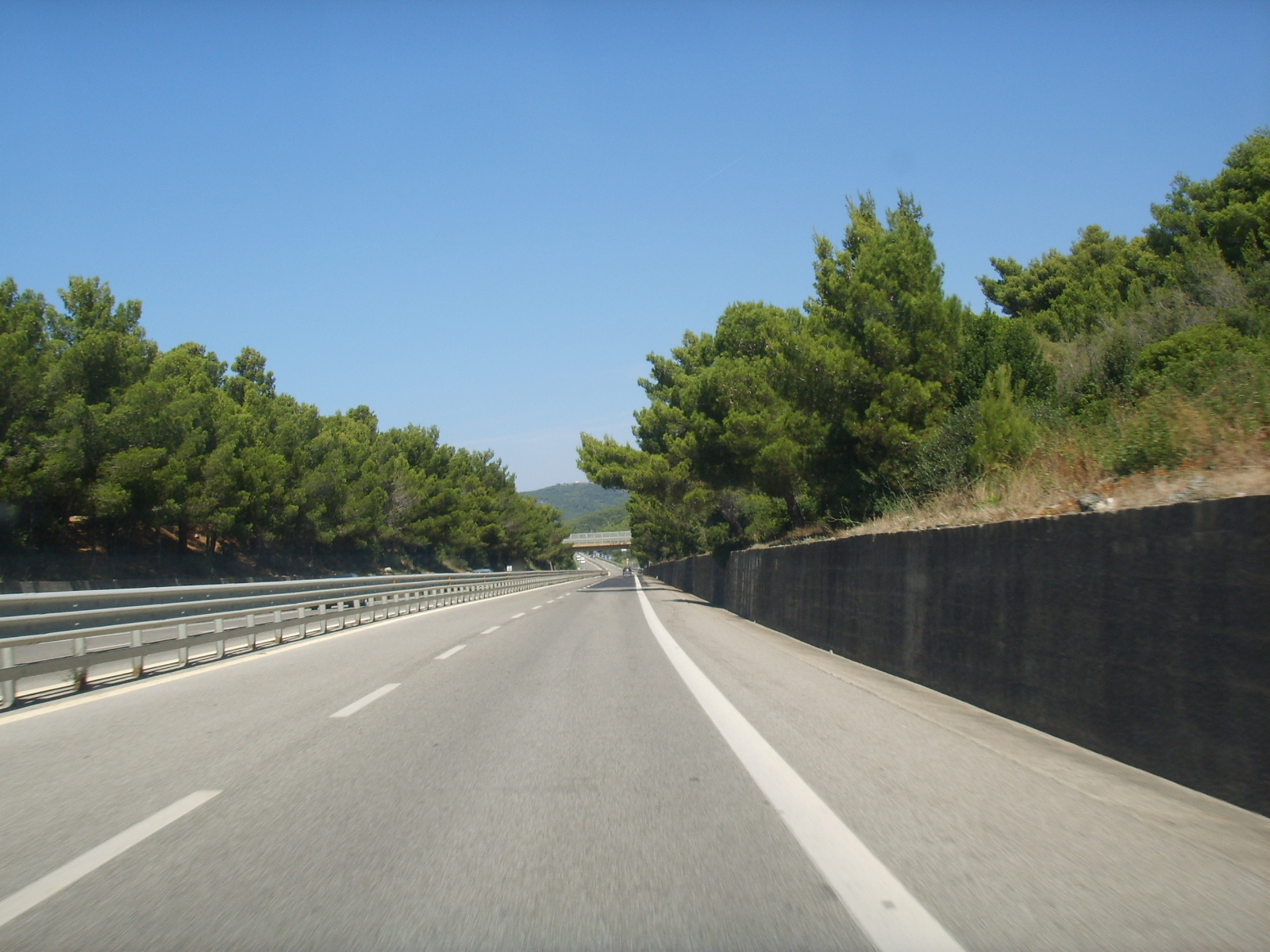
The stretch from Grosseto to Livorno of the Strada statale 1 Via Aurelia is classified as strada extraurbana principale.

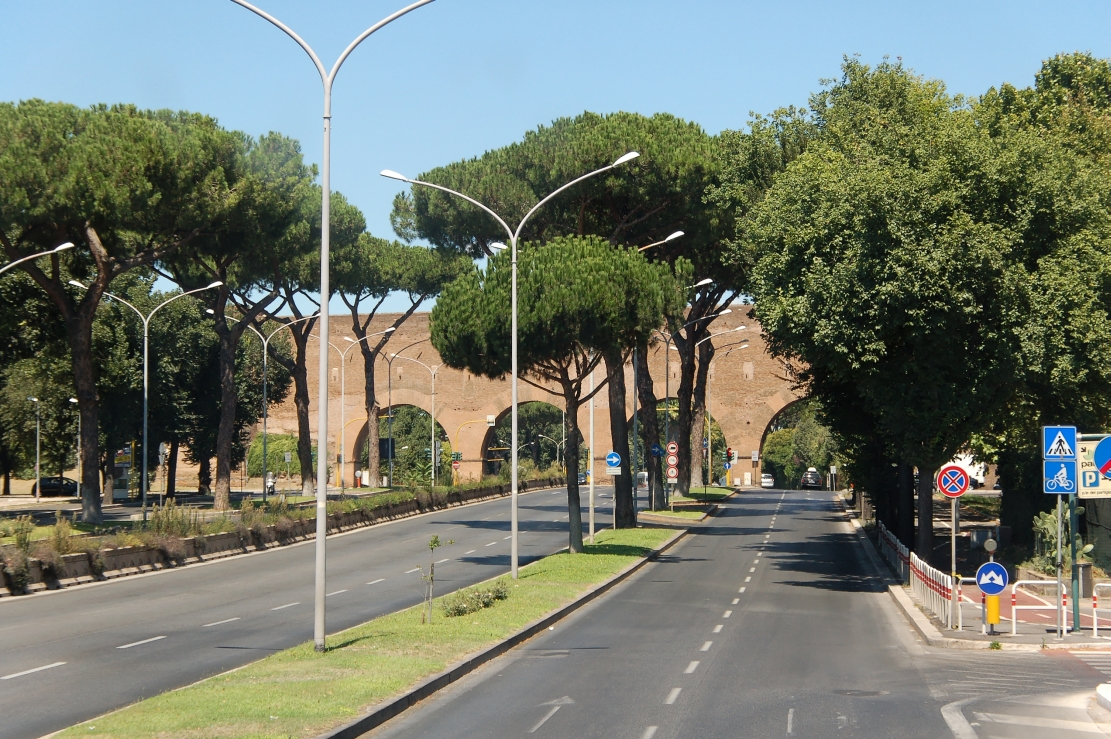
Via Cristoforo Colombo at Porta Ardeatina in Rome, classified as strada urbana di scorrimento.

Roads in Italy are an important mode of transport in Italy. Italian Highway Code (Codice della strada) divides dual carriageways into three different classifications:

- strada extraurbana principale (meaning main highway) or type-B road: a road with separate carriageways, at least two lanes for each direction, paved shoulder on the right and no cross-traffic. This type of road is quite similar to an autostrada or type-A road (Italian official name for motorways or freeways), but its building standards are lower. Access limitations and drive behaviour on type-B roads are the same as the motorways (no pedestrians, bicycles and other slow vehicles), as well as the signage (except for the background color, that is blue instead of green). Speed limits on type-B roads are up to 110 km/h (70 mph). Type-B roads are always toll-free.
- strada extraurbana secondaria (meaning secondary road) or type-C road. This category contains all the roads in non-urban context that are neither autostrada (type A) nor strada extraurbana principale (type B). This means that a dual carriageway that may not be classified as type-B road, since it does not meet such quality standards, belongs to this category. For type-C roads, there are neither special signage nor access restrictions, unless a specific sign is placed. The speed limit is 90 km/h (55 mph), on both single and dual carriageways.
- strada urbana di scorrimento (meaning urban expressway) or type-D road: a road in urban context, with separate carriageways, and at least two lanes for each direction. At-level junctions with smaller roads, regulated by traffic lights, are allowed as well as roundabouts. Unless a prohibition sign is placed, there are not access restrictions. Speed limits on this type of road are up to 70 km/h (45 mph).

Italian type-B and type-C roads do not follow a specific numbering criterion. They may be numbered as Strade Statali (SS; "state roads"), Strade Regionali (SR; "regional roads"), Strade Provinciali (SP; "provincial roads") or Strade Comunali (SC; "municipal roads").

=== Spain ===
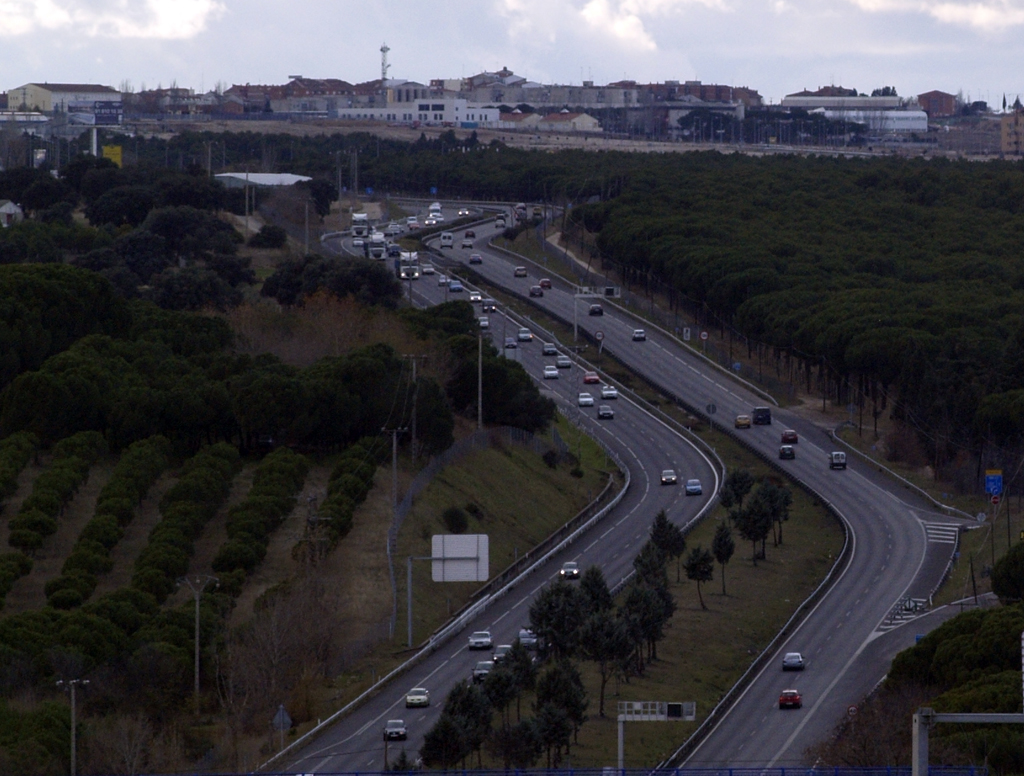
The autovía A-5 outside Madrid. It is a duplication of the old National Road 5.

The Spanish word for dual carriageway is autovía (literally autoway). All of them are government-owned and not tolled.

First-generation autovías, built in the 1980s and early 1990s, were just duplications in parallel of existing roads, as shown in the photograph. Modern autovías are two carriageways built from scratch, leaving the old road they replace as an alternative route for pedestrians, bicycles and other non-motorized vehicles.

Private properties may have direct access to an autovía, as well as bus stops and gas stations in the hard shoulders. A controlled-access highway (motorway) in Spain is referred to as autopista (literally autotrack). They may be operated by private companies and be tolled. The two major accesses to Spain from France, AP-7 into Catalonia and AP-8 into the Basque Country, are autopistas. In comparison, the prime road between Spain and Portugal is the photographed autovía A-5. In both autopistas and autovías, the generic speed limit is 120 km/h (75 mph), minimum speed is 60 km/h (37 mph), driving backwards is strictly prohibited, and they shall not have at-grade junctions.

=== Croatia ===
Dual carriageways or expressways in Croatia (Croatian: brza cesta) are non-tolled roads with 2 or more lanes in each direction, but without emergency lanes. The main motorways in Croatia are also dual carriageways, but they have emergency lanes and tolls.

Many bypasses and beltways of smaller cities in Croatia have been recently constructed or planned as dual carriageways. All dual carriageways in Croatia house a central median, usually fitted with guardrails.

The most heavily used expressways in Croatia is the D10 road, connecting capital Zagreb to Vrbovec and Križevci.

== Other regional implementations ==
=== United States ===
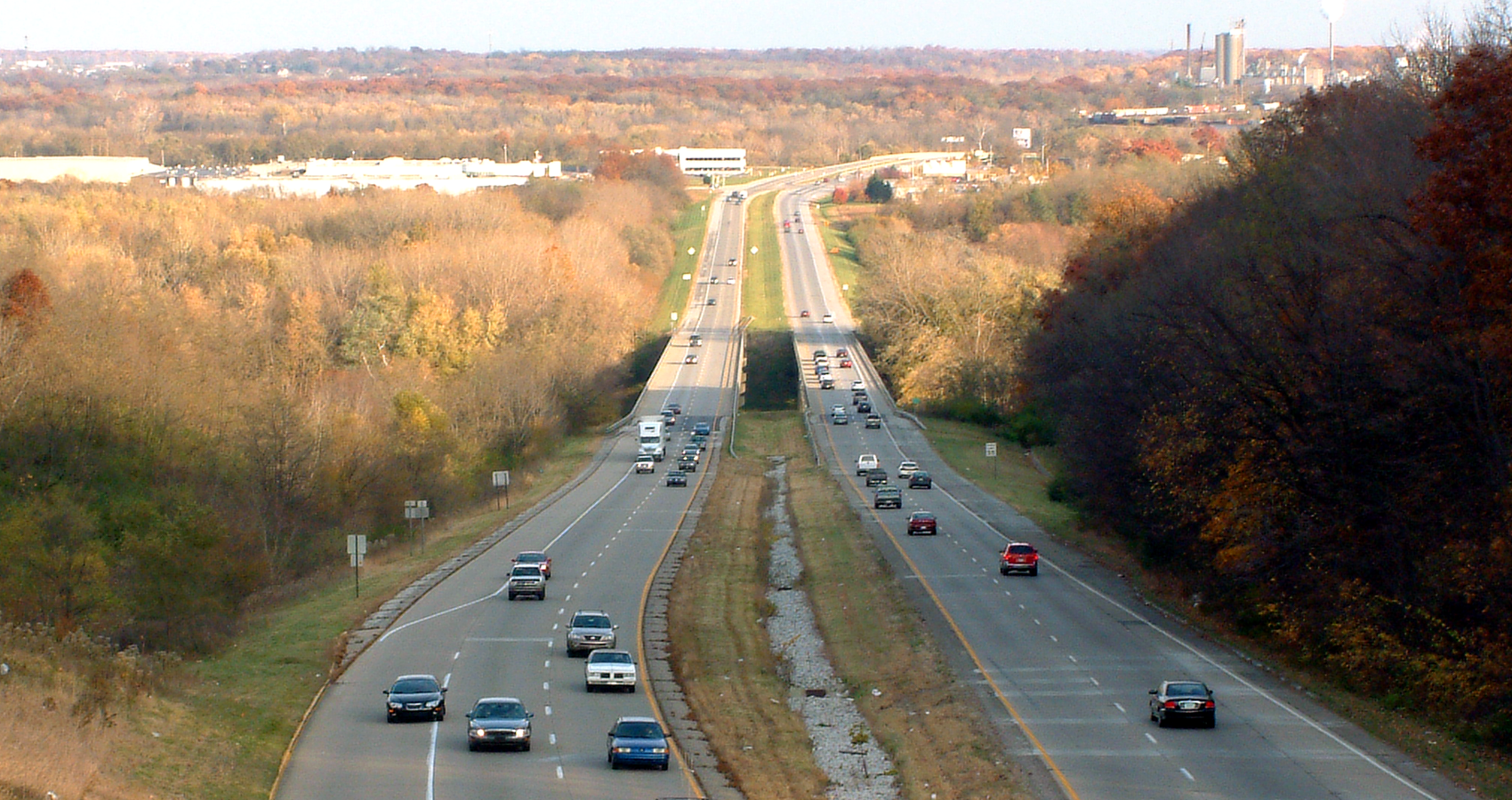
A divided highway (U.S. Route 52) in the state of Indiana

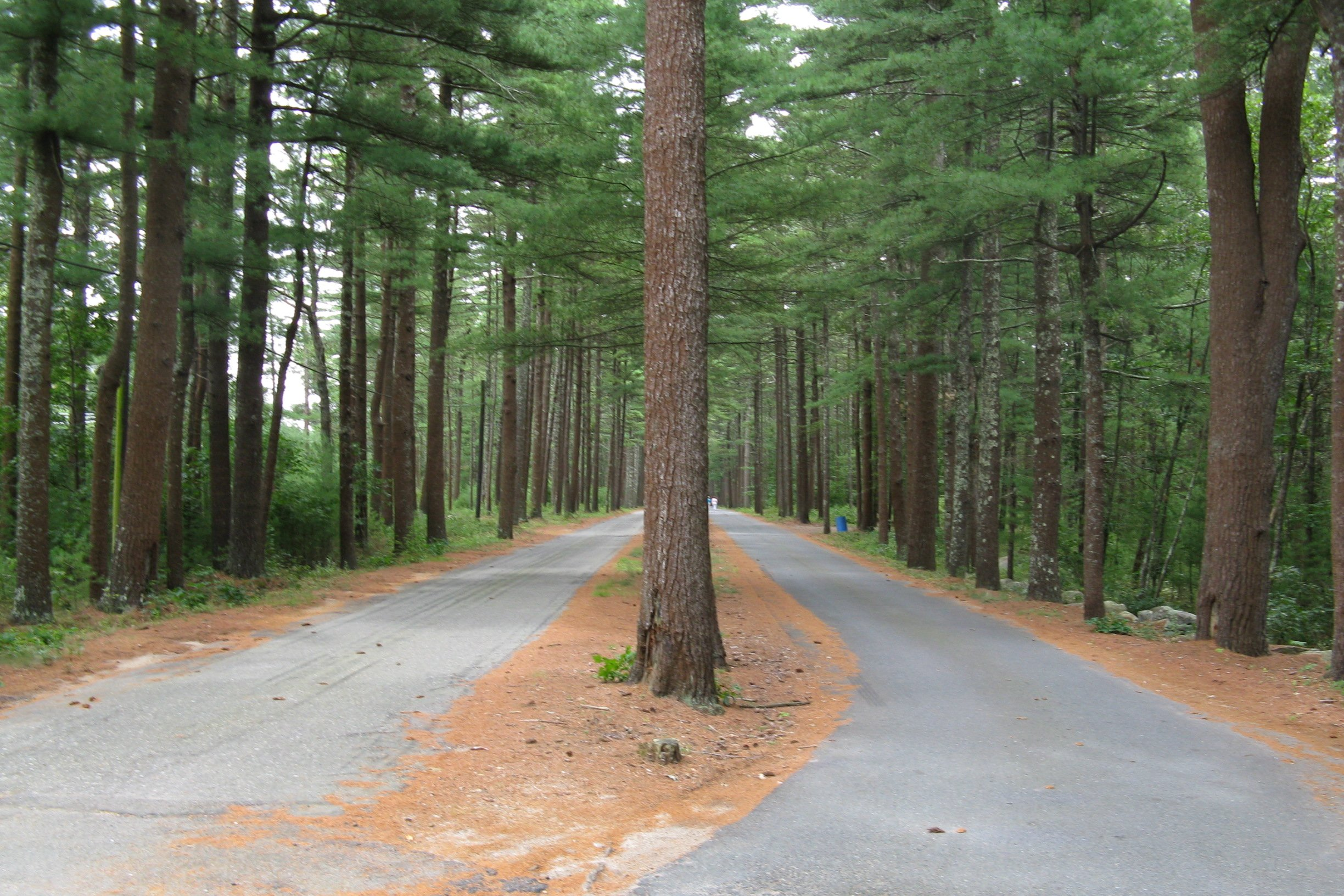
Savery Avenue in Carver, Massachusetts was the first divided highway in the U.S.

In the United States, this type of road may be called a divided highway, boulevard, parkway, expressway, freeway, or interstate, and has a grassy median or Jersey barrier separating the traffic directions. With few exceptions, all roads in the federally funded Interstate Highway System are fully controlled access divided highways known as freeways. A broader definition, expressways, includes both freeways and partial limited-access divided highways, and "expressway" is often used specifically to refer to the latter.

United States Numbered Highways, state highways and other locally maintained highways may also be divided. Speed limits on rural divided highways range from 65 to 75 miles per hour (105 to 121 km/h), with some portions as high as 80 miles per hour (130 km/h). One privately run toll road in Texas, SH 130, has the highest speed limit in the United States at 85 miles per hour (137 km/h). Urban divided highways which are at grade and typically have much lower speed limits are sometimes called boulevards.

In keeping with the U.S. Department of Transportation's Manual on Uniform Traffic Control Devices (MUTCD), since the early 1970s all divided highways are striped by color to show the direction of traffic flow. Two-way undivided roads have an amber center line, with a broken line indicating passing zones and a solid line indicating no passing zones and solid white baseline shoulder stripes.

On undivided roads with more than one lane in each direction, the center is normally marked with a double solid line. The double solid stripe denotes that it is illegal to pass on the other side of the center line. Multilane one-way carriageways use broken white lines between lanes; the median-side baseline is solid amber, and the right sideline is solid white.

Frequently in the U.S. the two carriageways are separated by some distance (wide medians with small forests or even hills in them), but drivers can always tell whether the roadway is two-way or one-way—and, if one-way, the direction in which the traffic flows—by looking at the striping coloration. For an example, see inset showing U.S. Route 52 near Lafayette, Indiana.

Some divided highways have been turned into undivided highways by widening the lanes of an existing road (for example US Highway 33 between Elkhart and Goshen in northern Indiana).

=== Canada ===
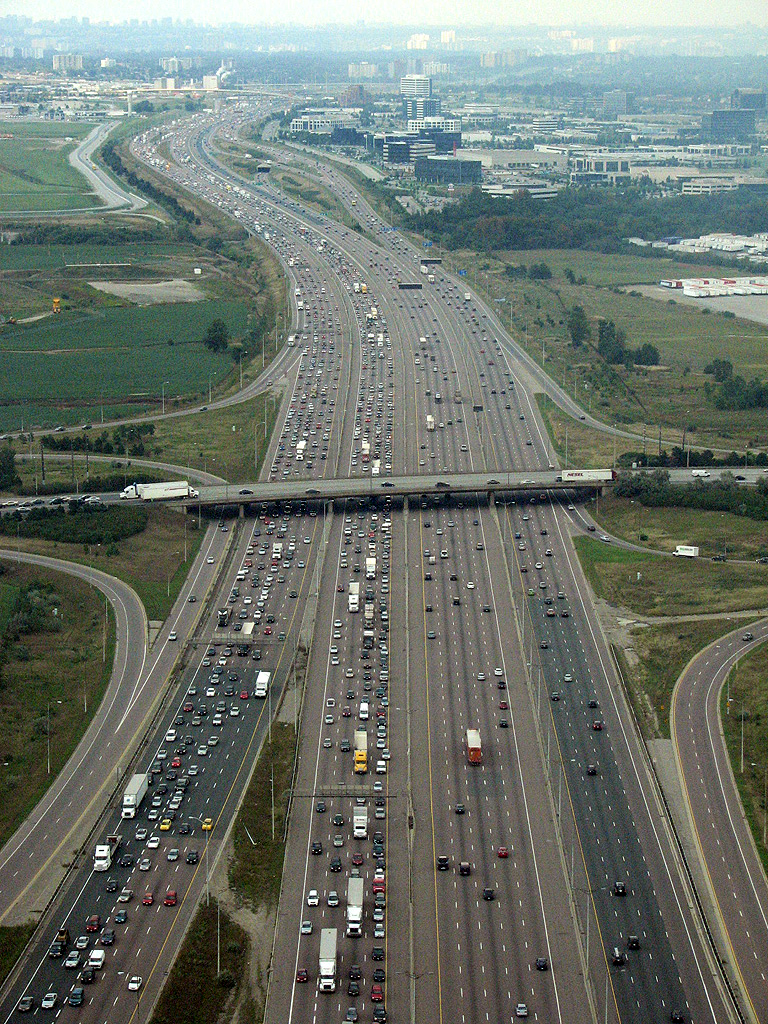
Highway 401, in Ontario, Canada, uses a divided highway, collector / express system to separate local traffic from longer-distance travellers.

Like other countries, there are several types of divided highways; fully controlled-access divided routes with interchanges (commonly known as "freeways" in the United States, Australia, and regionally within Canada), expressways that often include a mix of interchanges and traffic signals, and divided arterial roads that are almost entirely stop-controlled. Unlike some other countries, divided dual carriageways in Canada are seldom equipped with traffic circles, roundabouts, or rotaries as alternatives to stoplights.

In Canada, the term "divided highway" is used for this type of road, and the segment between the roadways is referred to as a "median". There may be gaps in the median strip of a partially controlled-access road to allow turning and crossing. More informally, a divided highway may be referred to as "twinned". This stems from the practice of "twinning" an existing two-lane highway and converting it into a divided highway. Such highways in southern Ontario, southern Quebec, and parts of Atlantic Canada usually feature full controlled-access with interchanges where robust federal and provincial funding has made such freeways possible. However, due to a lack of funding elsewhere, partial controlled-access "expressways" and limited-mobility divided arterial roads are more common in the western provinces where there are no specially numbered systems of freeways.

On some portions of Ontario's 400-series highway network, the median may be either steel guardrail or an Ontario tall-wall barrier rather than an unpaved strip, particularly in urban areas.

Some partial limited-access divided highways such as the Hanlon Parkway and Black Creek Drive have stop-controlled at-grade intersections and private entrances, but have sufficient right-of-way to convert them to full freeways with interchanges if traffic warrants. There are also RIRO expressways, such as Highway 11 and a portion of Highway 35, which are not full freeways since they allow access to existing properties, but traffic speeds are faster than regular roads due to a median barrier preventing left turns (motorists have to use a "turnabout" overpass to access exits on the opposing direction). Speed limits in Canada are usually 80–90 km/h (50–56 mph) on signalized divided highways and 100–120 km/h (62–75 mph) on freeways.

=== Australia ===
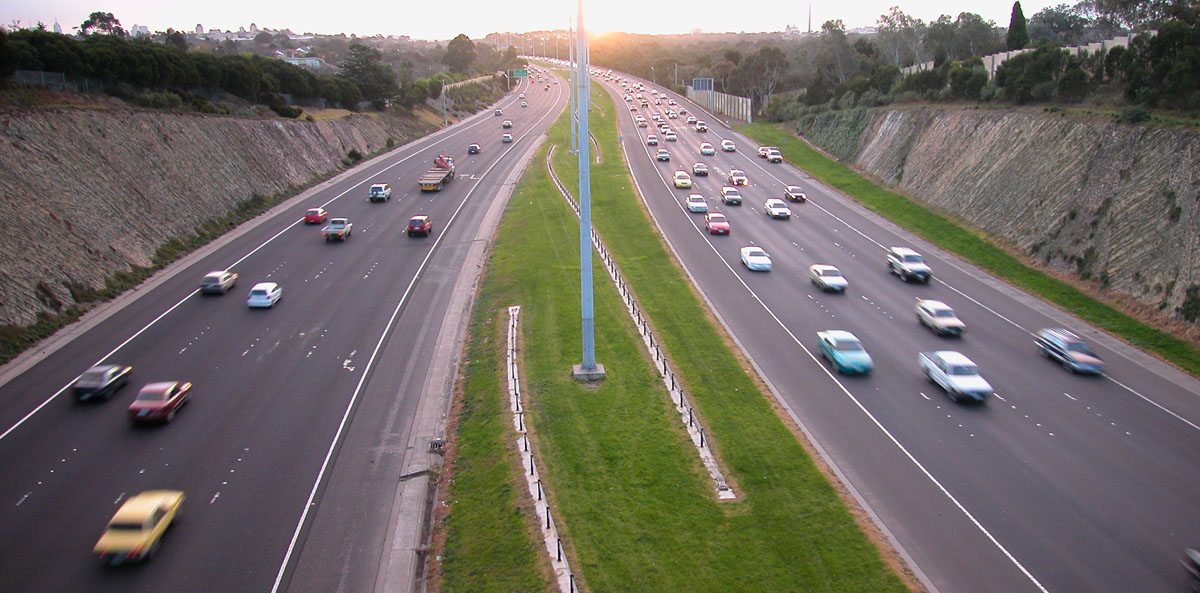
The Eastern Freeway, a typical dual carriageway in Melbourne, Australia

In Australia, dual carriageways are referred to in some regions as divided roads, though there is no official terminology. Each state's road agency has its own definition of what constitutes a 'motorway/freeway' standard divided road. Most states only declare a divided road as a 'motorway' or 'freeway' if access is completely controlled. Speed limits are usually 100 km/h (62 mph) or 110 km/h (68 mph).

VicRoads, the agency responsible for highways in the state of Victoria, has often declared rural limited-access dual carriageways as freeways. Furthermore, VicRoads applies the M designation to these roads in alpha-numeric route numbers, where most other states will only do so if access is completely controlled.

Dual carriageways exist in and around the major capital cities however there are currently several road projects under construction have now been completed, creating roughly 2,000 kilometres (1,200 mi) of continuous dual carriageway from Geelong in Victoria to Curra in South East Queensland except for one 14 kilometres (8.7 mi) section of the Pacific Highway through Coffs Harbour.

Since 2013, it has been possible to drive between Australia's two largest cities (Sydney and Melbourne) on a continuous dual carriageway. When it was completed, the Hume Highway duplication became the first major interstate duplicated motorway.

=== Argentina ===
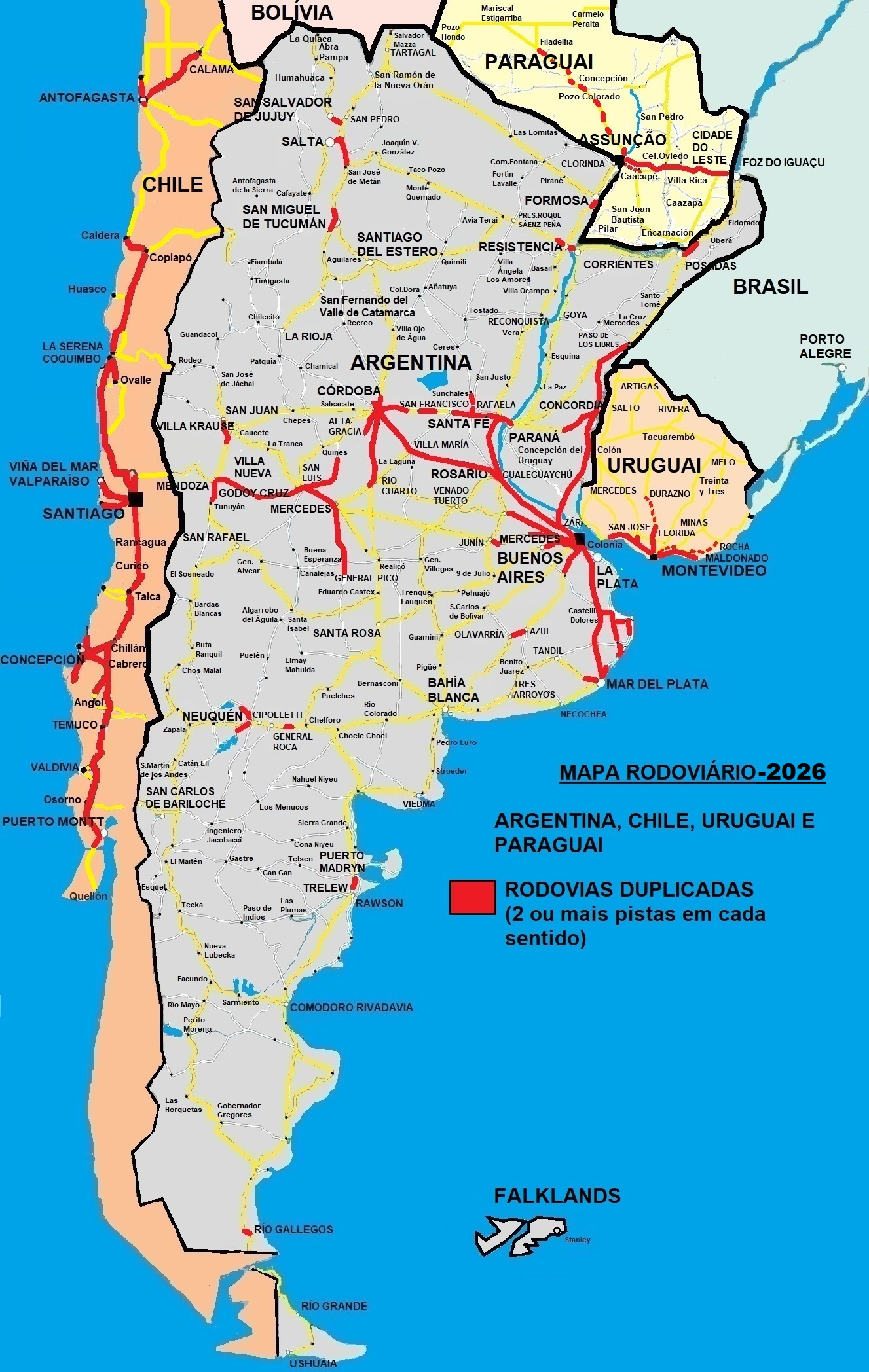
Road system in South America, with divided highways highlighted in red.

Argentina has approximately 2,800 km (1,700 mi) of divided highways. This includes major national routes such as 50 km (31 mi) of RN 1 between Buenos Aires and La Plata, 157 km (98 mi) of RN 3 between Buenos Aires/San Miguel del Monte and Puerto Madryn/Trelew, 485 km (301 mi) of RN 7 between Buenos Aires and Mendoza, 700 km (430 mi) on RN 9 between Buenos Aires, Rosario and Córdoba, and 589 km (366 mi) of RN 14 between Buenos Aires and Paso de los Libres, on the border with Brazil. Most such roads are designated autopistas (freeways) with full grade separation, and the remainder partially grade-separated highways with intersections and u-turns.

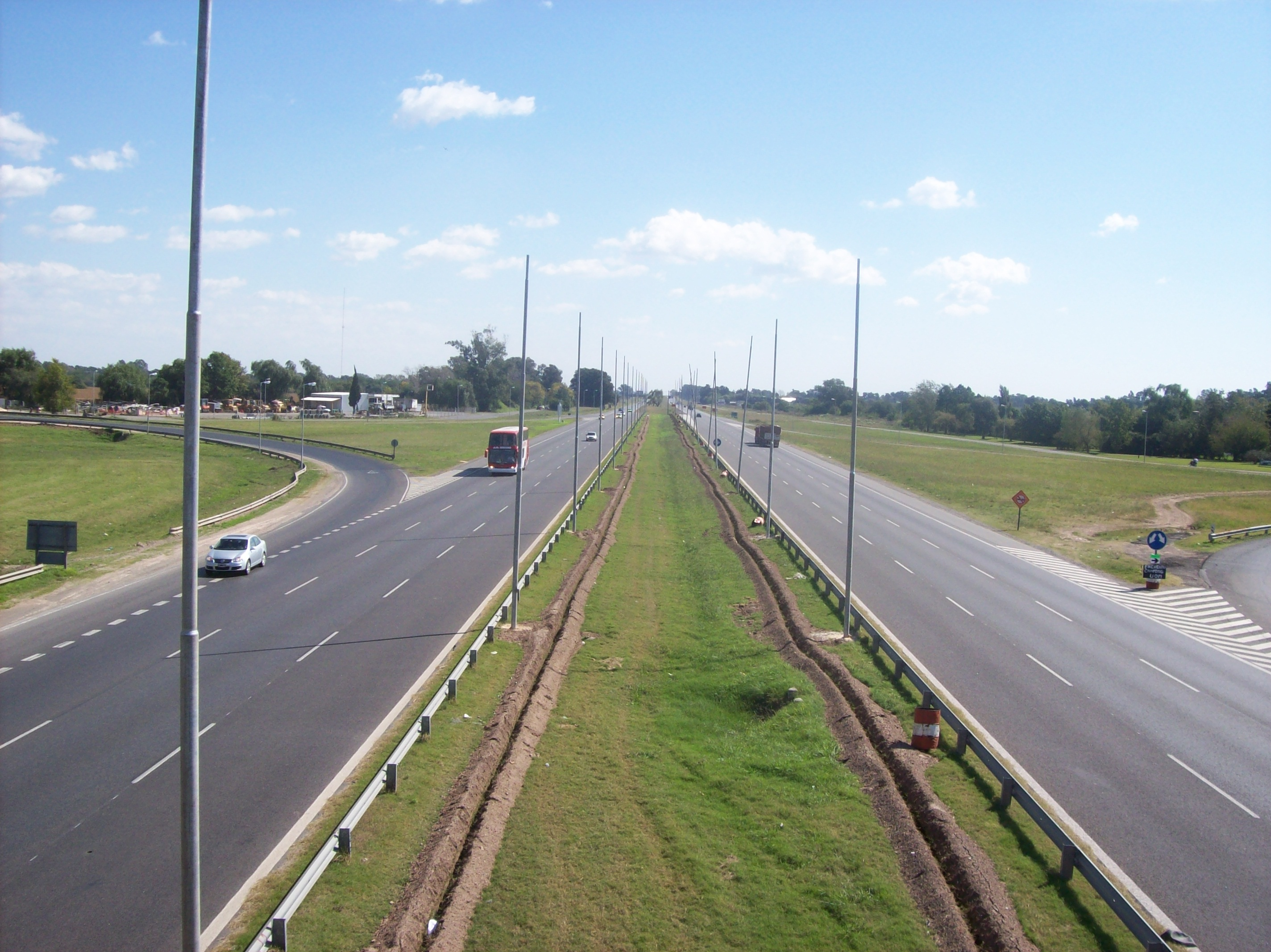
RN9/RN14 in Zárate

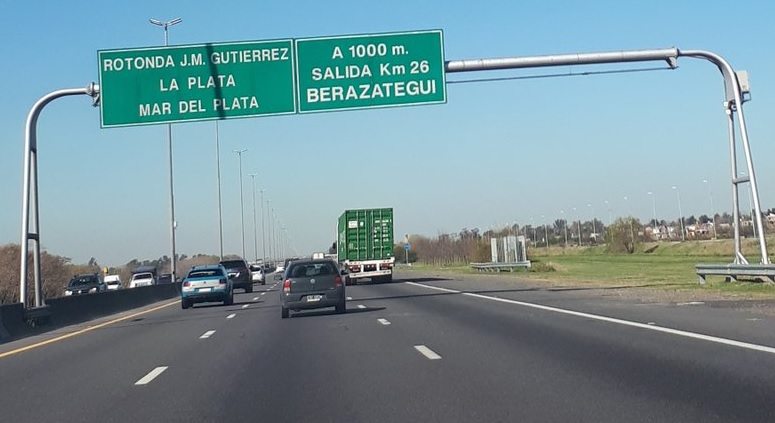
Route 1 in Buenos Aires

=== Brazil ===
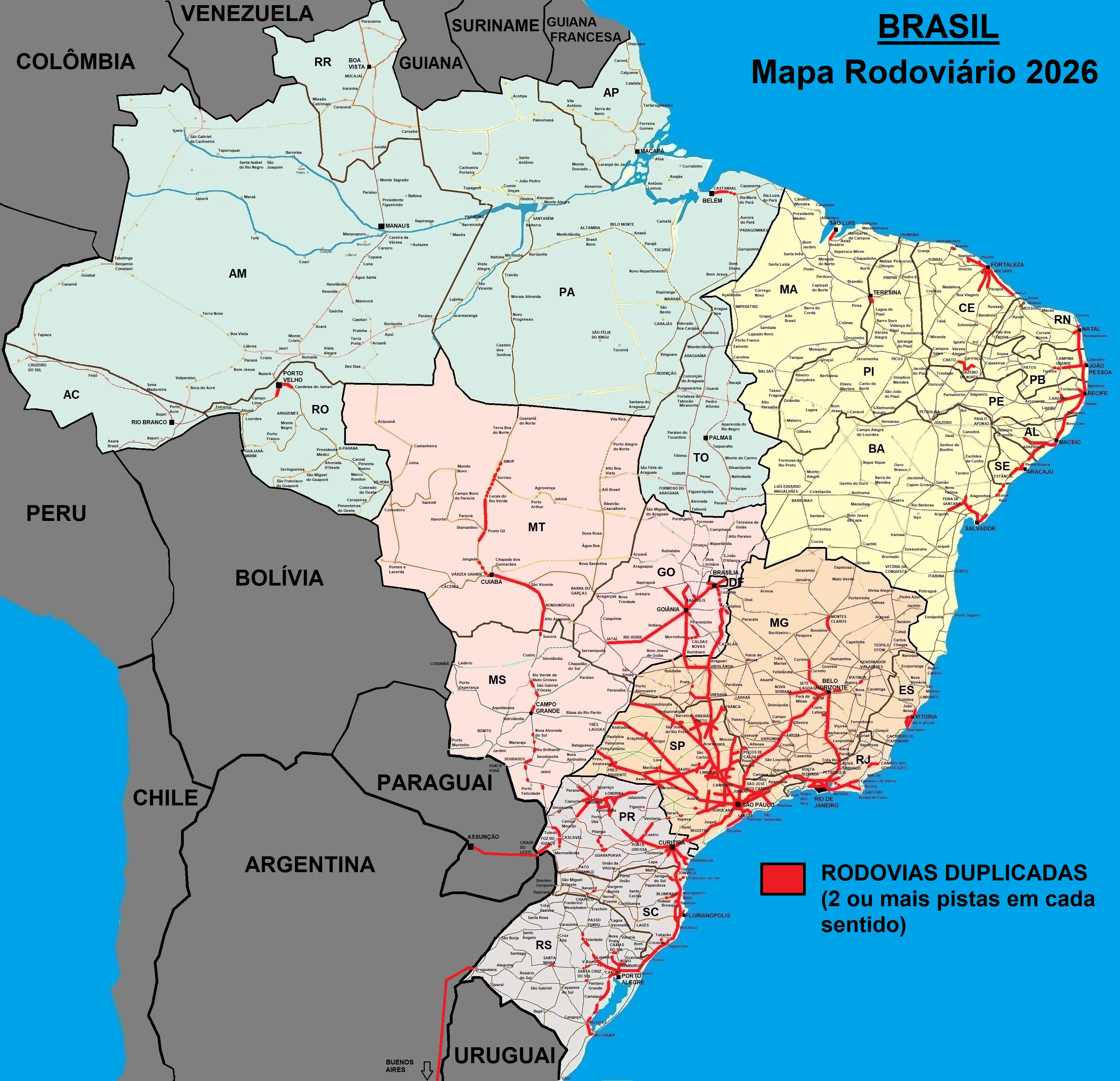
Road system in Brazil, with divided highways highlighted in red.

The country has about 17,000 km (10,563 mi) of divided highways, 6,300 km (3,915 mi) only in the State of São Paulo. Currently it's possible to travel from Rio Grande, in the extreme south of the country, to Brasília (2,580 km (1,603 mi)) or Casimiro de Abreu, in the state of Rio de Janeiro (2,045 km (1,271 mi)), only on divided highways.

The first highway to be transformed into a divided highway in Brazil was Rodovia Presidente Dutra, which is part of BR-116. In the stretch between the 2 largest cities in the country, São Paulo and Rio de Janeiro, the highway was duplicated in 1967.

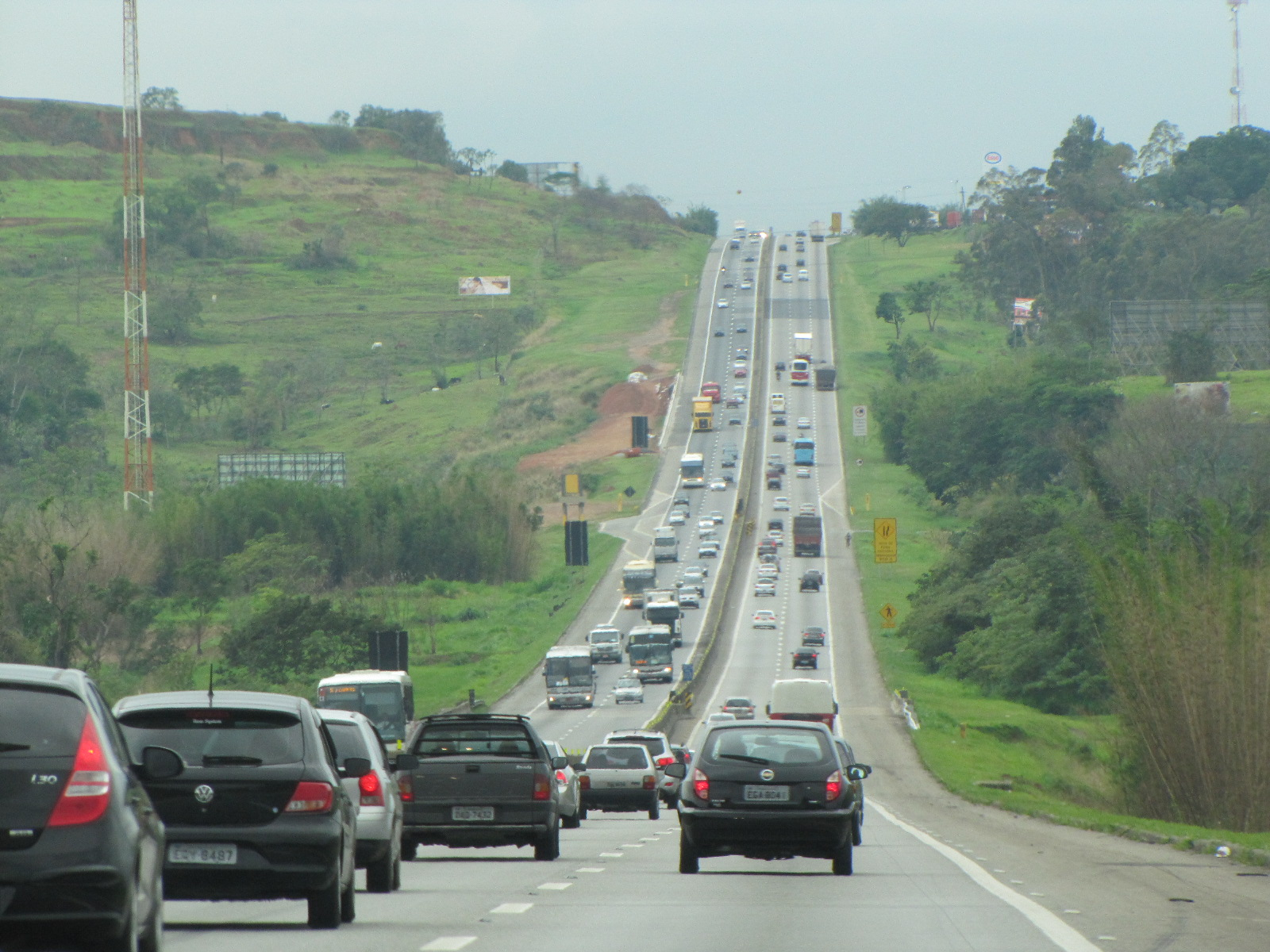
BR-116 in the state of São Paulo

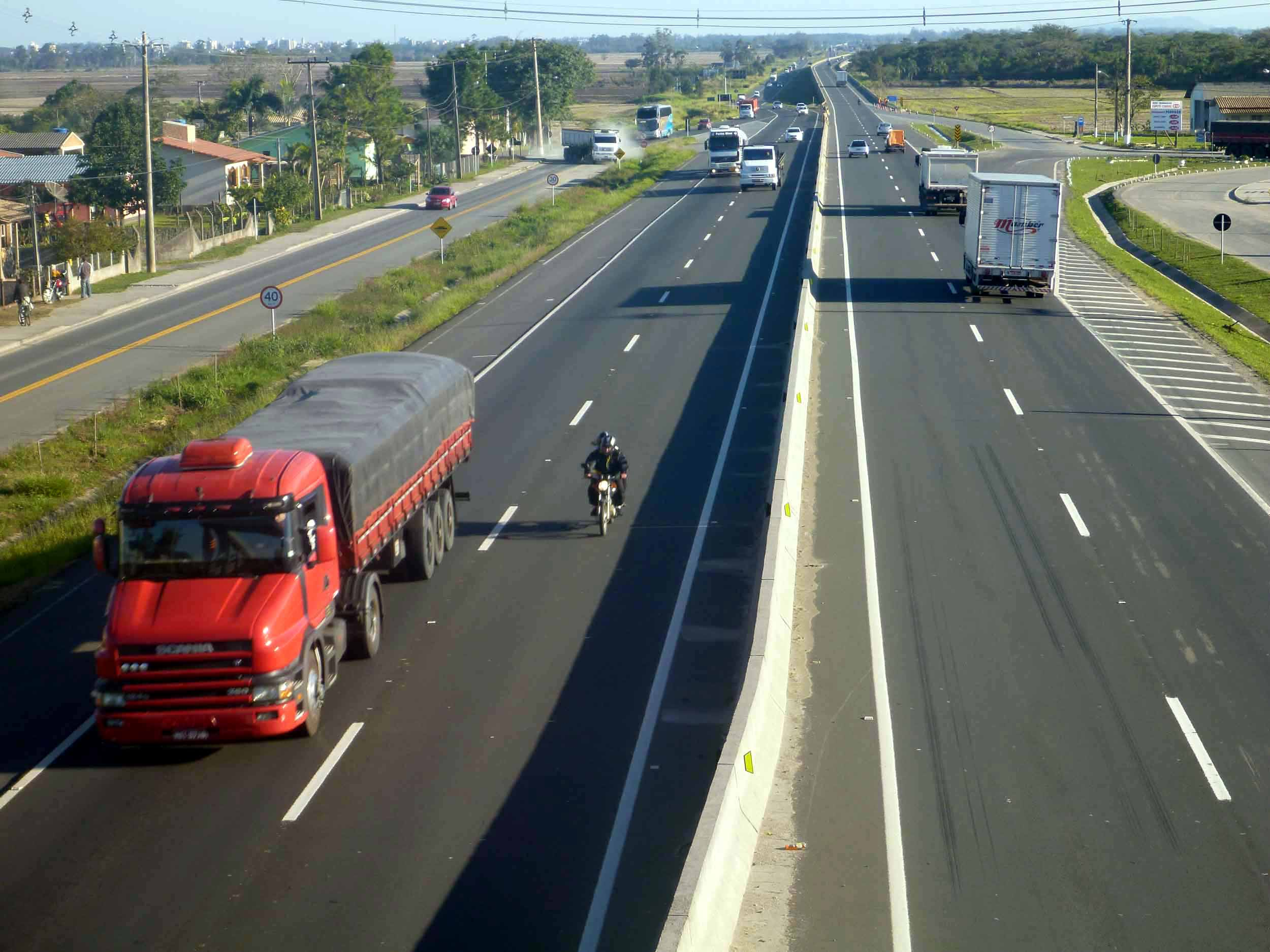
BR-101 in the state of Santa Catarina

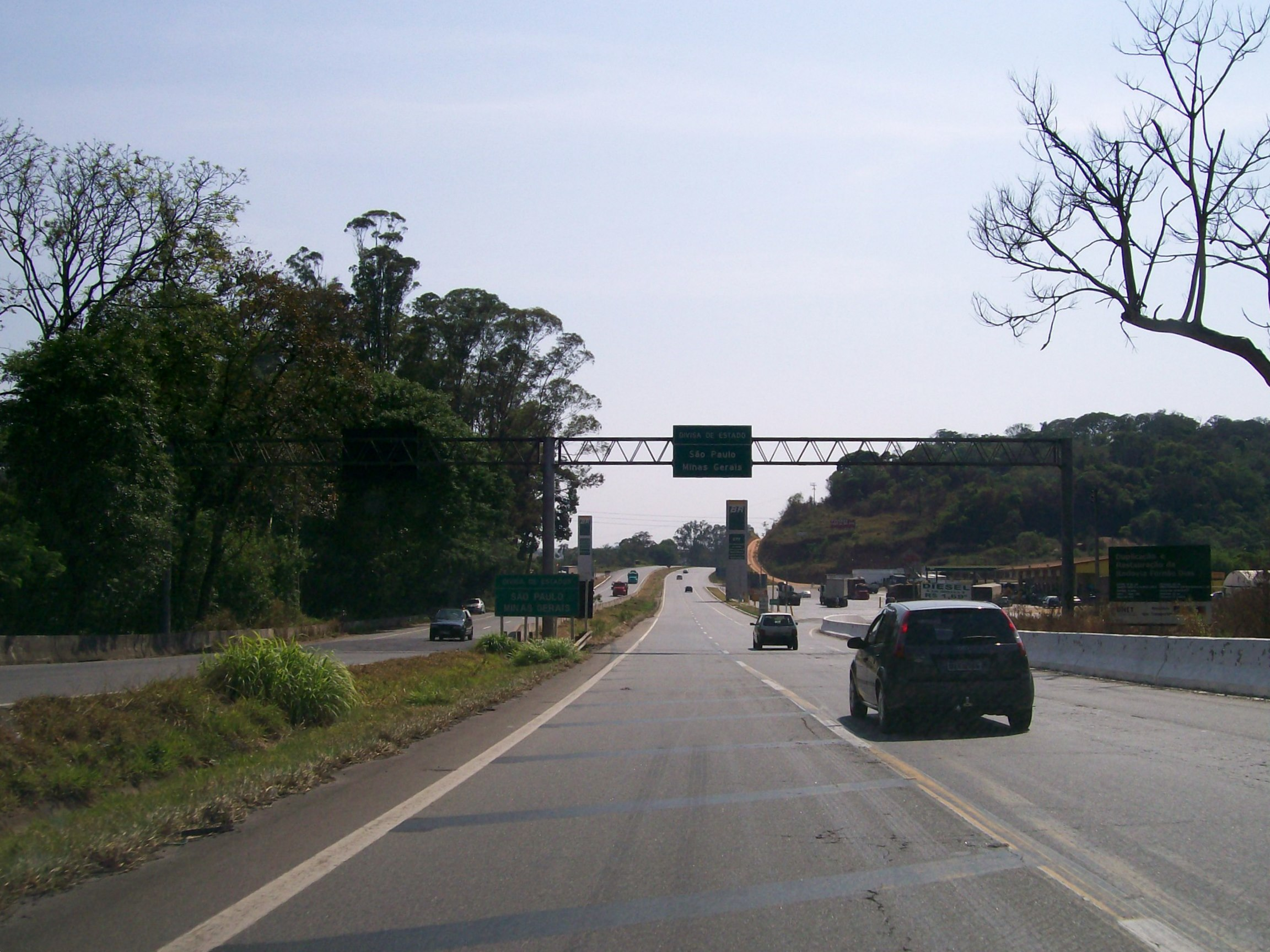
BR-381 in the state of Minas Gerais

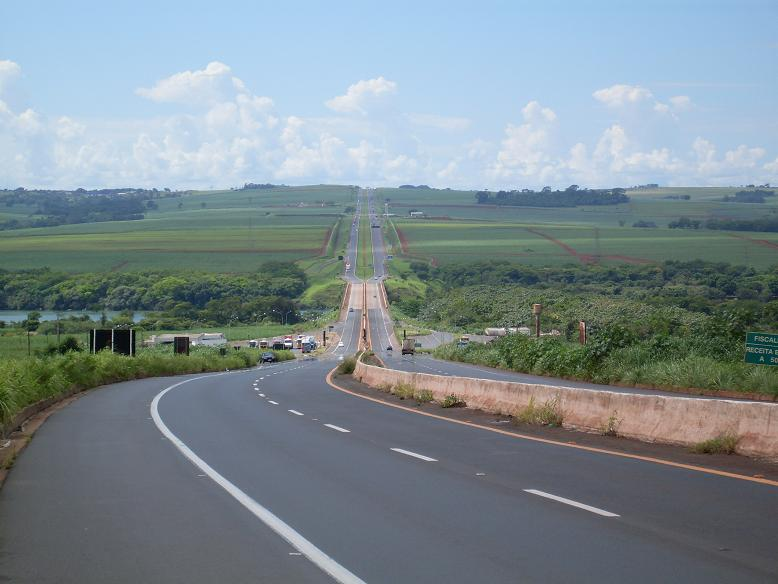
BR-050 in the state of São Paulo

=== Chile ===
Chile's main highways is Route 5 (Pan-American Highway), which is a divided highway for 1,900 kilometres or 1,200 miles between Puerto Montt and Caldera. Route 68, (110 kilometres or 68 miles) connecting Santiago to Valparaíso, is also a divided highway. In 2020, Chile had 3,347 km (2,080 mi) of divided highways, the second largest network in South America, after Brazil.

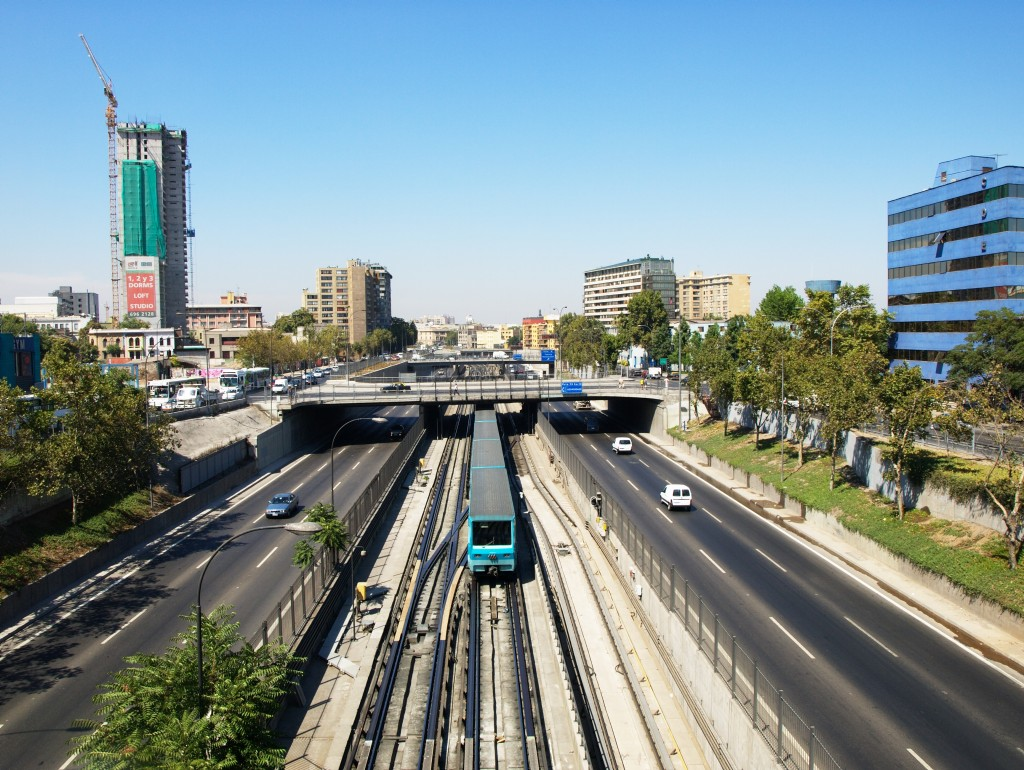
Route 5 (Pan-American Highway) in Santiago

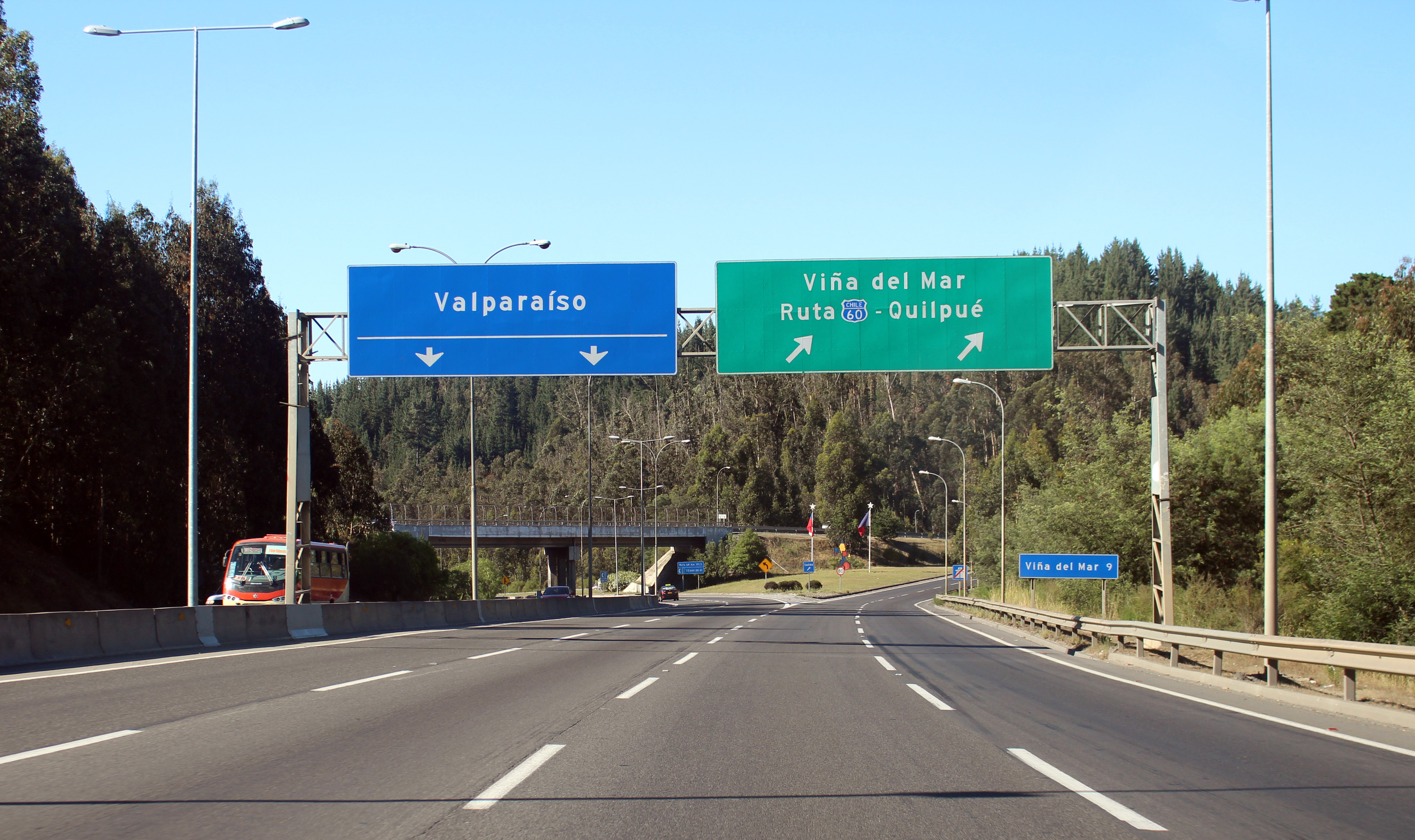
Route 68 going to Valparaiso

=== China ===
Many sections of national highways in mainland China are built as dual carriageways with partial grade separation. On some routes, such as China National Highway 106, there is a central reservation. Expressways of China are mostly dual carriageways with grade separation, usually with toll collection.

=== India ===
India has many dual carriageways, most of which are under the control of National Highways Authority of India and some of them are under state and local authorities. Expressways, many national highways, and some state highways are built as dual carriageways. Many national highways are upgraded to dual carriageways under the Golden Quadrilateral and Bharatmala programmes. Major arterial roads in cities are usually dual-carriageways.

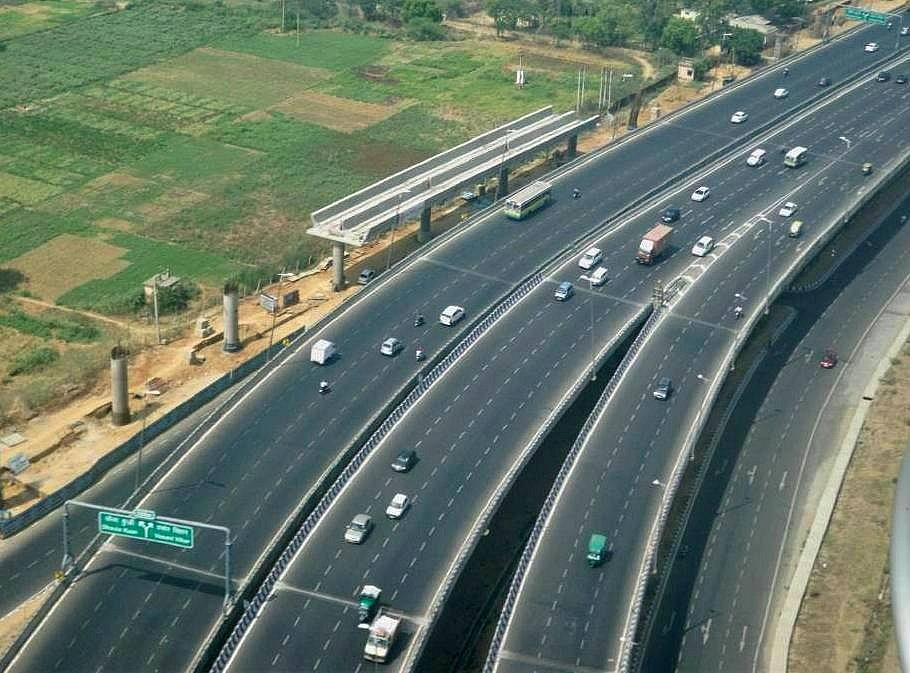
Flyover on the Delhi–Gurgaon Expressway (NH48) near Indira Gandhi International Airport

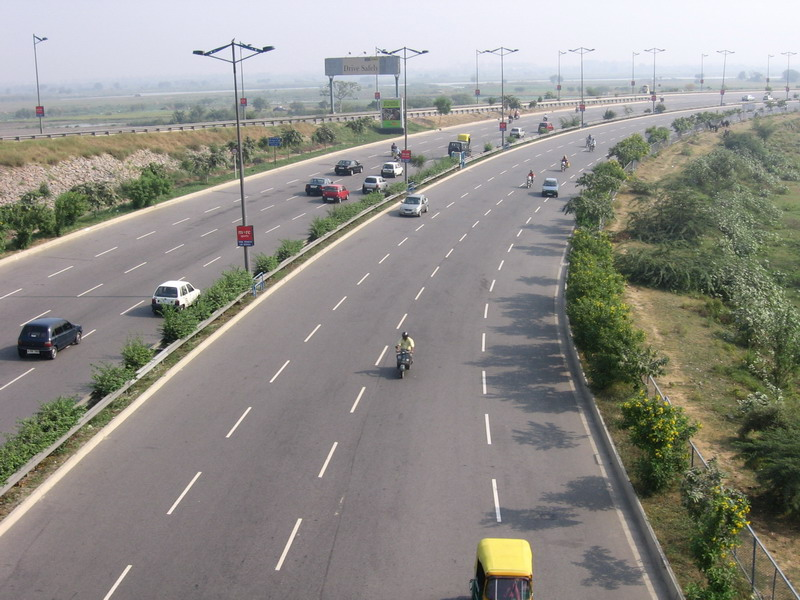
Delhi Noida Direct Flyway

=== Malaysia ===
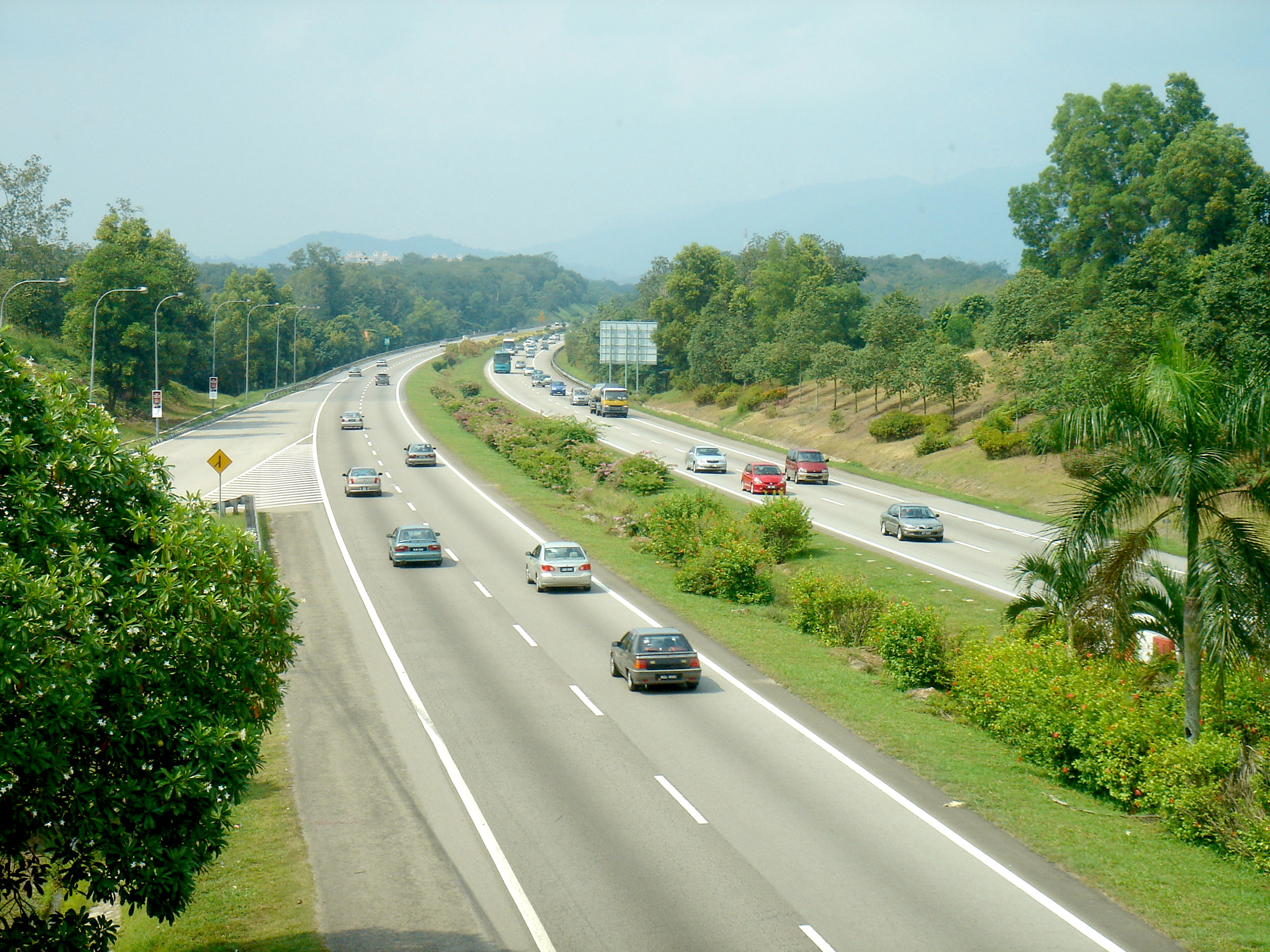
The North–South Expressway in the west coast of Peninsular Malaysia

Expressways in Malaysia such as the North–South Expressway (the main expressway in Peninsular Malaysia), and the East Coast Expressway (serving the Peninsular east coast) are mostly dual carriageways with partial or full control of access and at least 2 lanes per direction. Stretches of federal roads are also built as dual carriageways, such as the Federal Highway (serving Kuala Lumpur), the AMJ Highway (linking Malacca and the Johorean towns Muar and Batu Pahat) and upgraded segments of the Pan Borneo Highway in Sabah and Sarawak. Some highways at Klang Valley have underpasses, tunnels and flyovers e.g. SMART Tunnel (mostly tunnel section) and Ampang–Kuala Lumpur Elevated Highway (mostly elevated). Apart from expressways and high-quality federal roads, treelined dual carriageways avenues and boulevards feature in most urban areas.

=== Pakistan ===
Major stretches of national highways in Pakistan are built as dual carriageways, such as the majority of N-5 and N-55, but most of these have frequent intersections, driveways and U-turns slowing traffic and only have partial grade separation. Expressways and motorways are built to dual-carriageway standard and have control of access.

=== Philippines ===
Expressways and major roads in Metro Manila and Metro Cebu are examples of dual carriageways in the Philippines. Expressways such as the North Luzon Expressway (NLEX), South Luzon Expressway (SLEX) Southern Tagalog Arterial Road (STAR Tollway) and Subic–Clark–Tarlac Expressway (SCTEX) are built to dual carriageway standard, with full grade separation. Some highways in the major metropolitan areas are built as dual carriageways with partial grade separation using overpasses/flyovers, underpasses and tunnels.

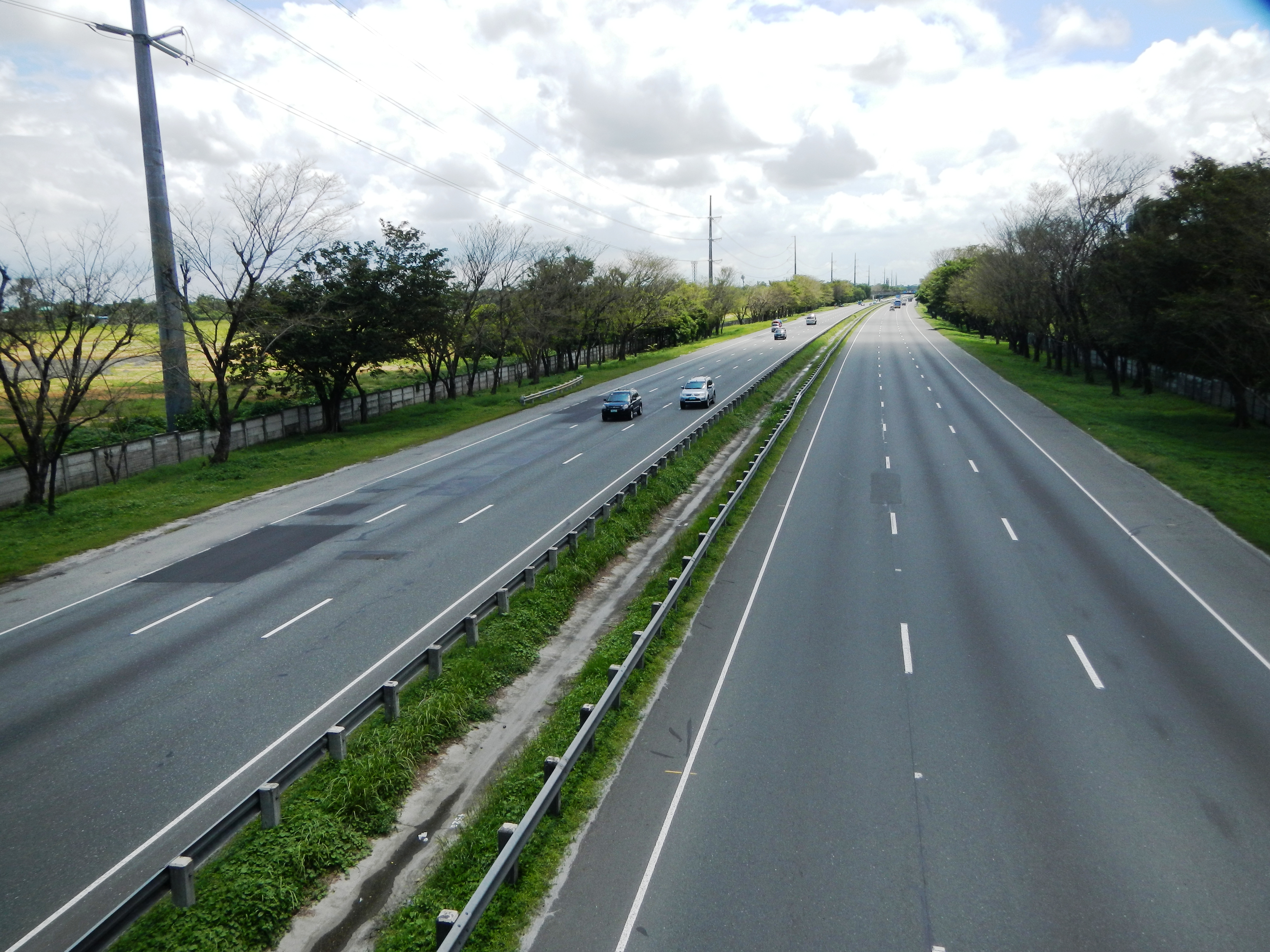
A portion of the North Luzon Expressway in Bulacan

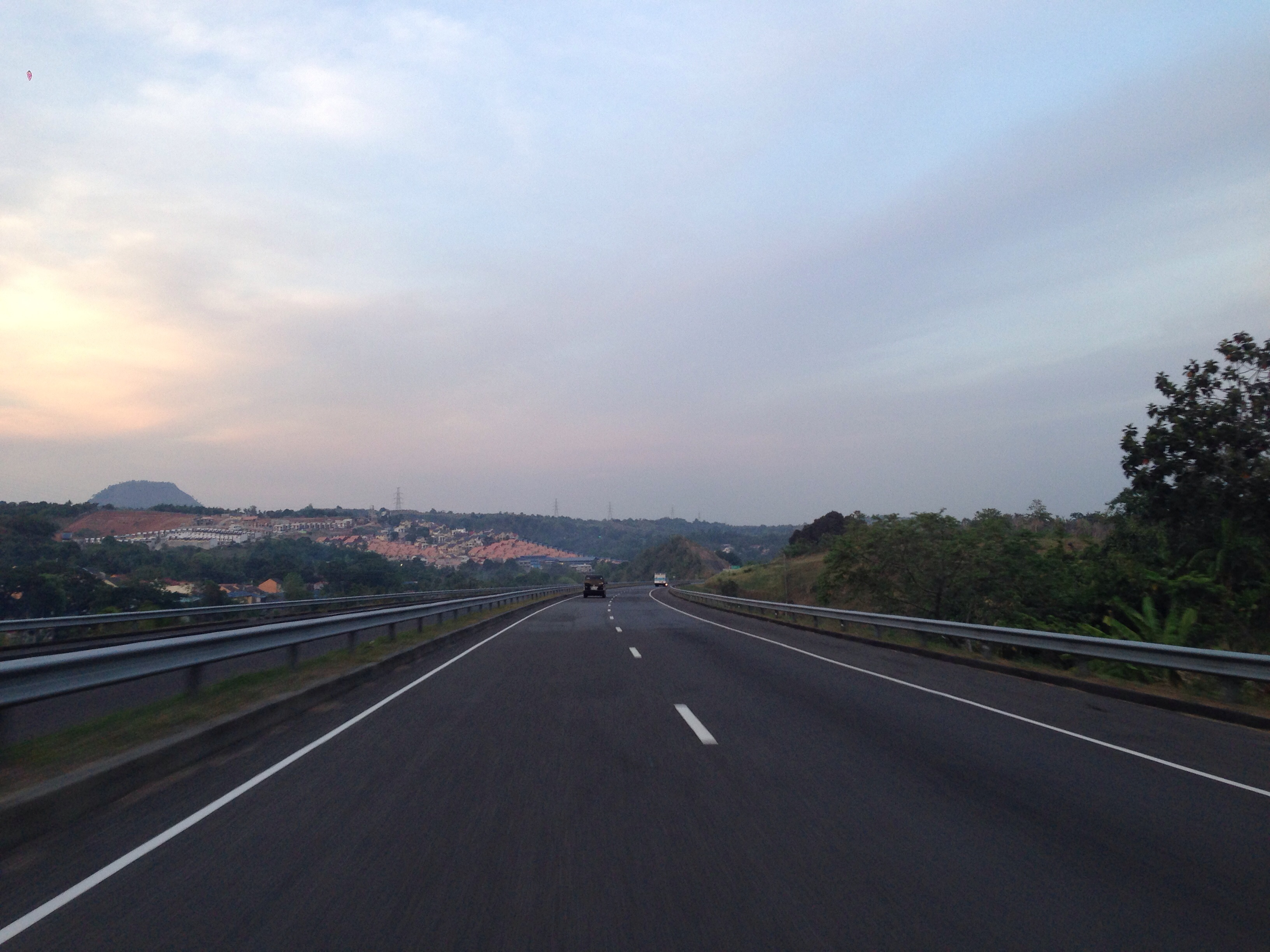
A portion of Subic–Clark–Tarlac Expressway in Bataan

=== Singapore ===
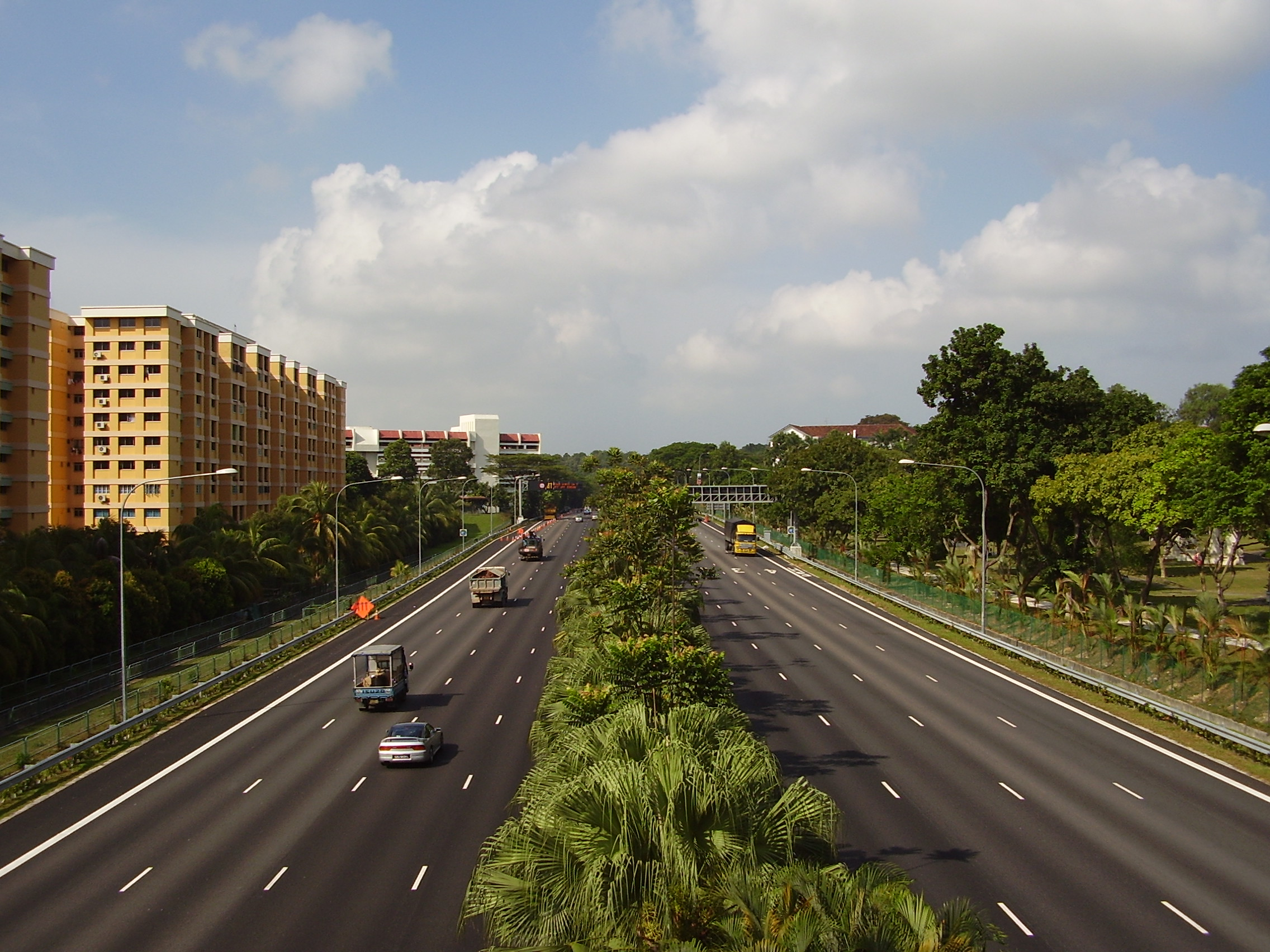
The Pan Island Expressway in Singapore.

A high proportion of roads in Singapore are dual carriageways with central reservations; examples include Clementi Road, Commonwealth Avenue and Holland Road. Often there might be railings erected on the central reservation to prevent pedestrians from dashing across the road. These usually have traffic lights along the way but flyovers and road tunnels (or 'underpasses') can be built to minimize the use of traffic lights; for example, at the Holland Road-Farrer Road-Queensway junction there are three levels of roads. Before the 1980s, roundabouts were popular, but since then many have been changed to traffic-light controlled junctions.

These dual carriageways are to be distinguished from motorways, known in Singapore as expressways such as the Pan-Island Expressway (PIE) and Ayer Rajah Expressway (AYE) where no traffic lights are used.

=== Thailand ===
Most highways in Thailand are single carriageways with a hard shoulder. Dual carriageways have frequent u-turn lanes and intersections slowing down traffic. Coupled with the increase in the number of vehicles and the demand for controlled-access motorways, the Thai Government issued a Cabinet resolution in 1997 detailing the motorway construction master plan. Some upgraded sections of highway are being turned into motorways, while other motorways are being built anew.

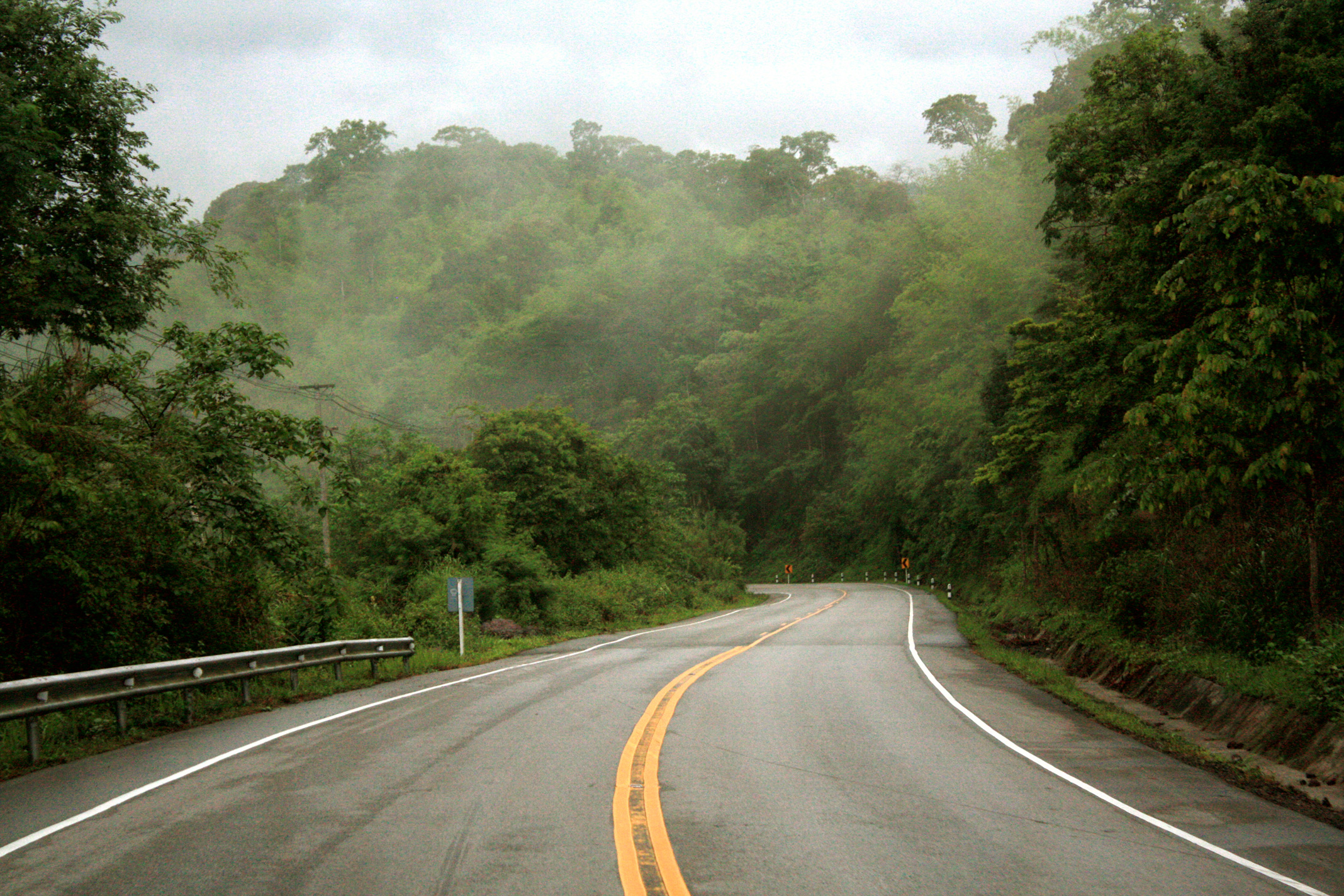
Highway 12 single carriageway with a hard shoulder in Phetchabun

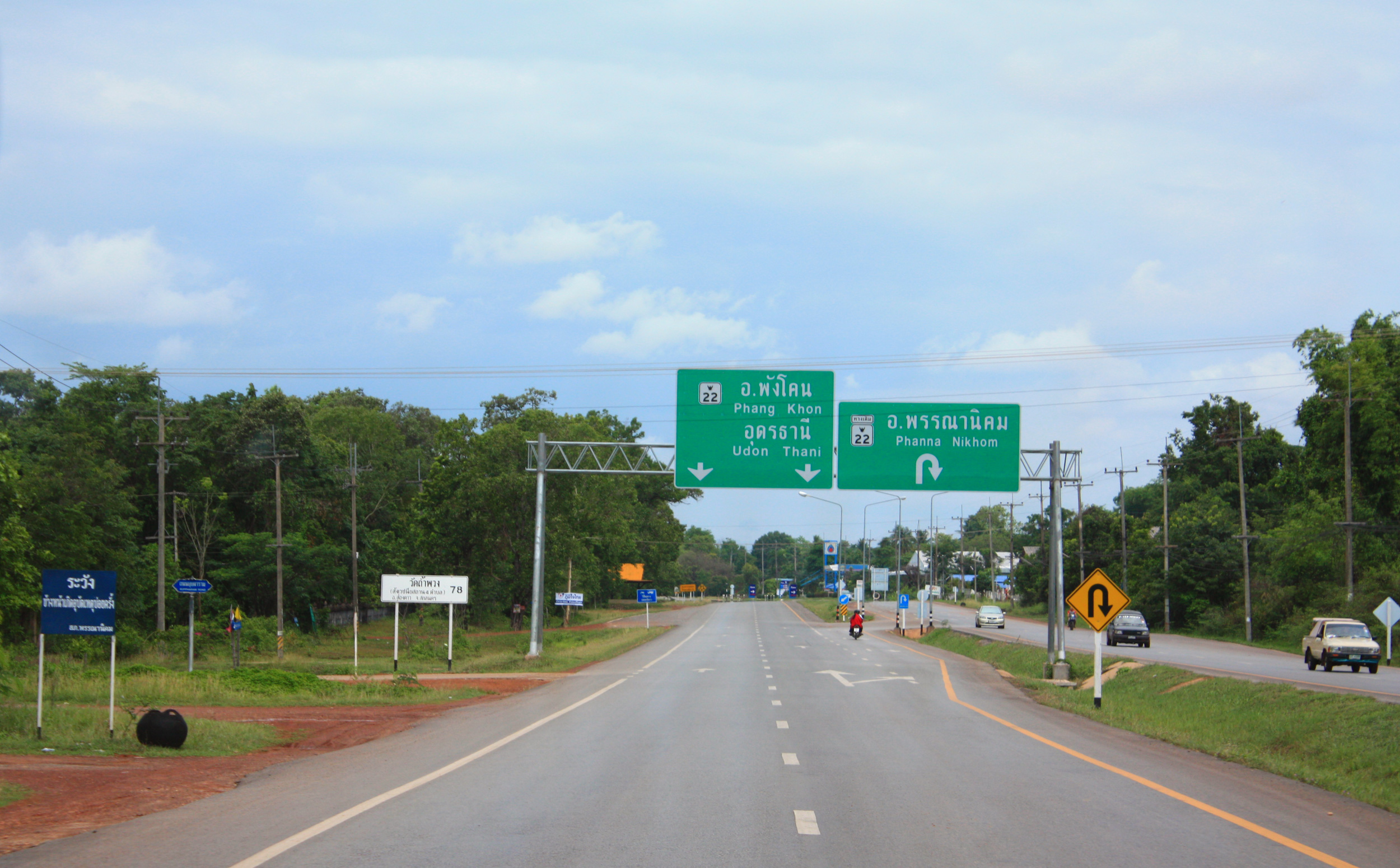
Highway 22 dual carriageway with u-turn in Sakon Nakhon

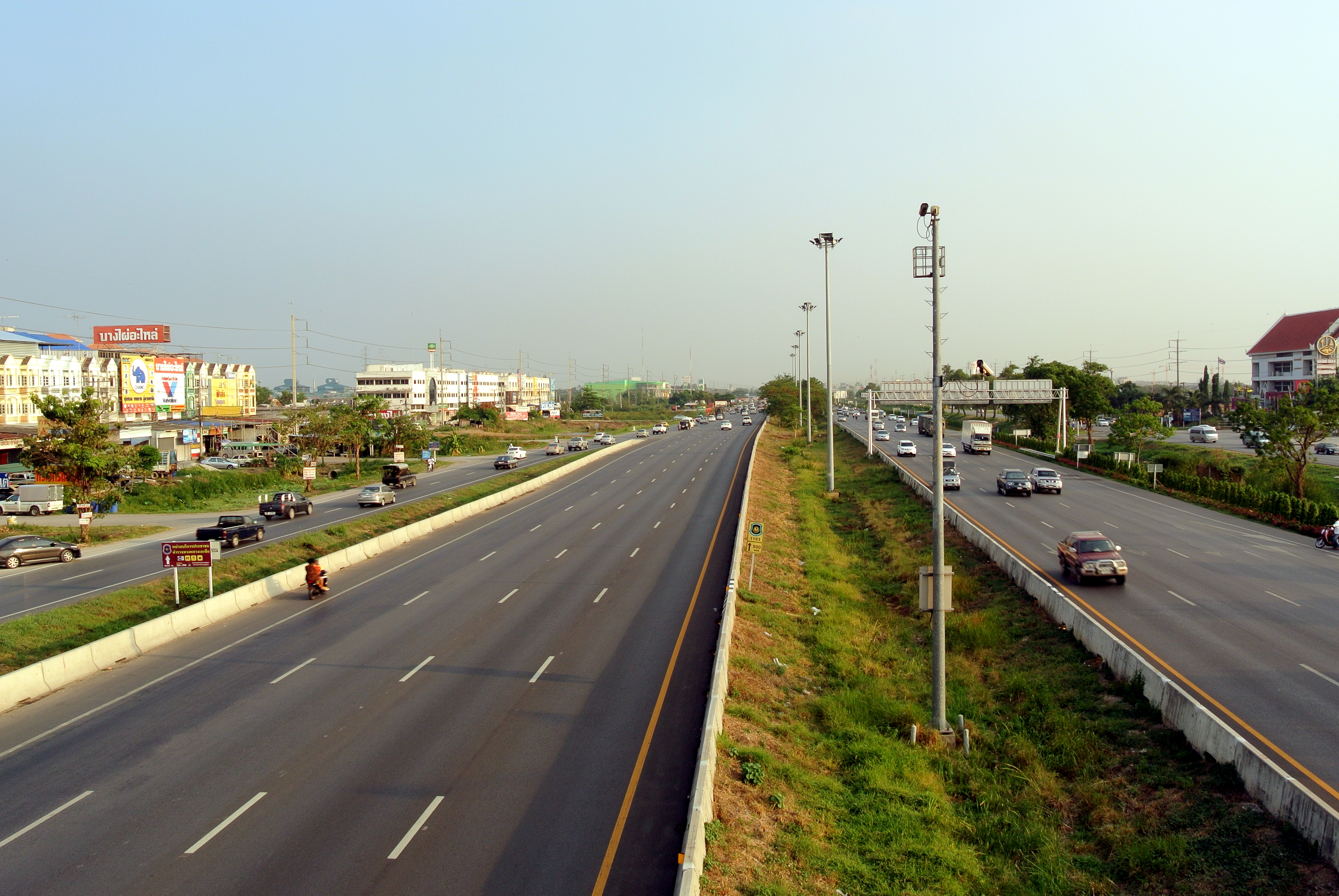
AH1, AH2 and Highway 32 in Ayutthaya

=== Turkey ===
Turkey has 28,986 km (18,011 mi) of dual carriageway as of January 2023. Speed limit varies, but the speed limit is normally 110 km/h (68 mph) on dual-carriageway state roads (devlet yol e.g. D 100). Turkey has 3,633 km (2,257 mi) of motorways (otoyol or otoban). The minimum speed limit on Turkish motorways is 40 km/h (25 mph) and the maximum is 140 km/h (87 mph). Almost all of the network is 6 lanes (3 in each direction) wide and illuminated. Some parts converted from uncontrolled-access dual carriageways are 4 lanes (2 in each direction) wide. Motorway signage in Turkey is green and uses the Highway Gothic typeface.

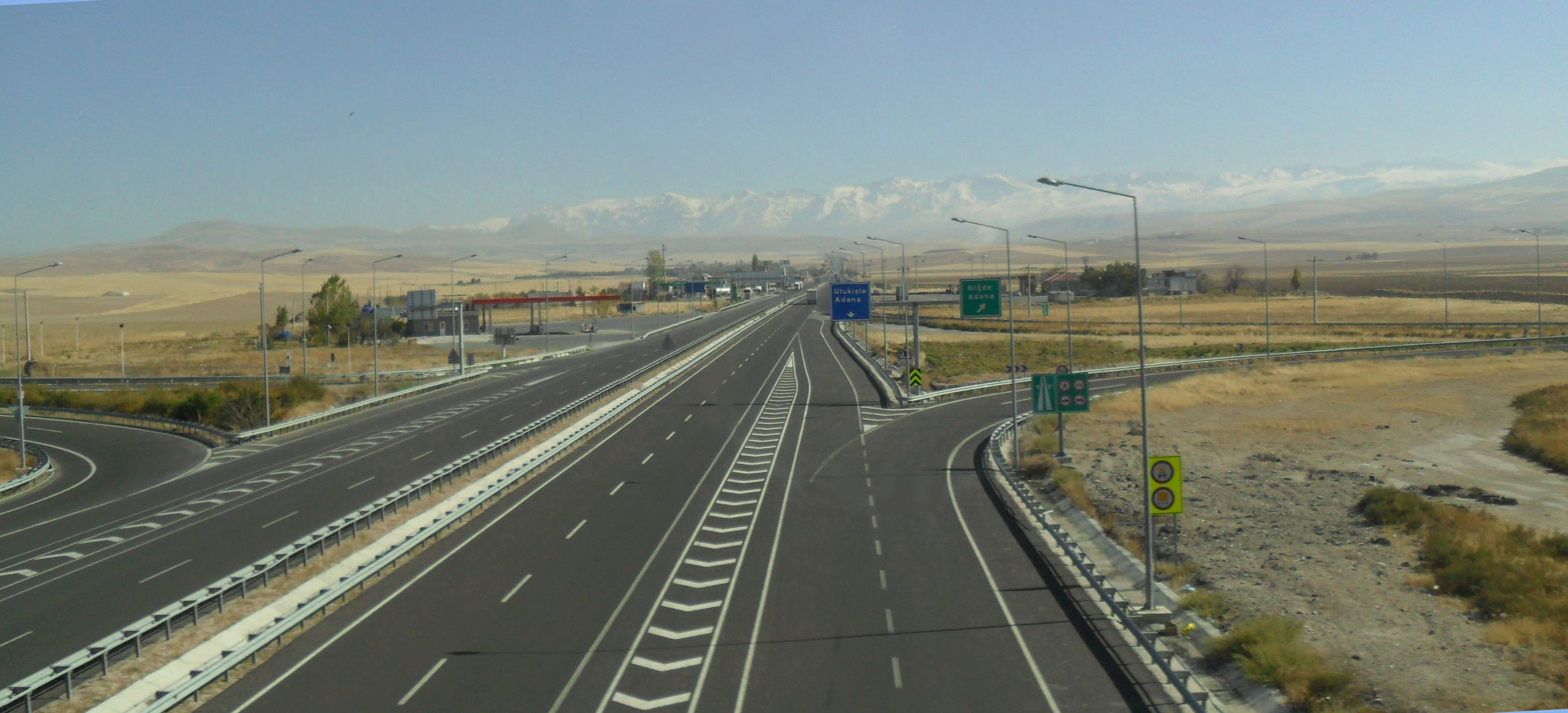
Turkish state road D 750 at Konya junction. Toros Mountains in the background

== See also ==
- 2+1 road
- Controlled-access highway (also known as motorway, freeway or expressway)
- Limited-access road (also known as expressway or high-quality dual carriageway)
- Single carriageway
