= Bundesautobahn 540 =

Federal motorway in Germany

A 540
- Bundesautobahn 540

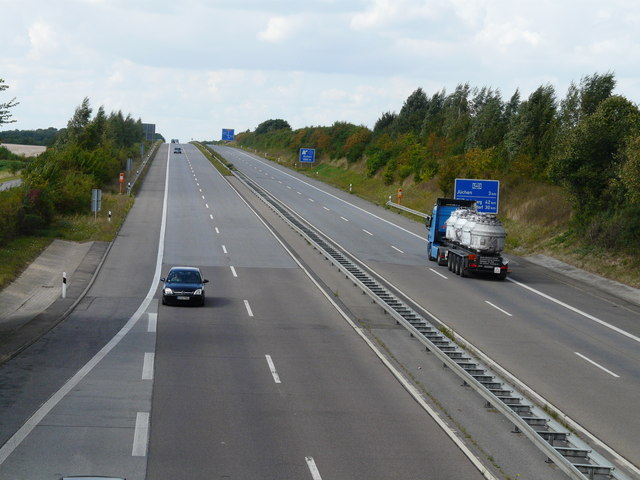

Route information
- Length: 7 km (4.3 mi)
- History: Downgraded to a portion of the B 59 in 2020

Location
- Country: Germany
- States: North Rhine-Westphalia

Highway system
- Roads in Germany; Autobahns; List; Federal; List; State; E-roads

Bundesautobahn 540 (translates from German as Federal Motorway 540, short form Autobahn 540, abbreviated as BAB 540 or A 540) was an autobahn in western Germany, connecting Jüchen and Grevenbroich, partly replacing the Bundesstraße 59. It was two lanes in each direction. There was no speed limit and very little traffic on this autobahn.

== History ==
From 1999 to 2005 this road have been used as a filming location for RTL Television series Alarm für Cobra 11 – Die Autobahnpolizei.

In 2020, the A 540 was downgraded to a Bundesstraße (federal road), and designated as part of the B 59.

== Exit list ==
(1)	Jüchen 4-way interchange A 46 B 59
	Elsbach-Brücke
(2)	Gustorf
	Erft
(3)	Frimmersdorf
(4)	Grevenbroich-Süd B 59
	Allrath (planned)
	Sinsteden (planned)
