= Bundesstraße 59 =

Federal highway in Germany

B 59
- Bundesstraße 59

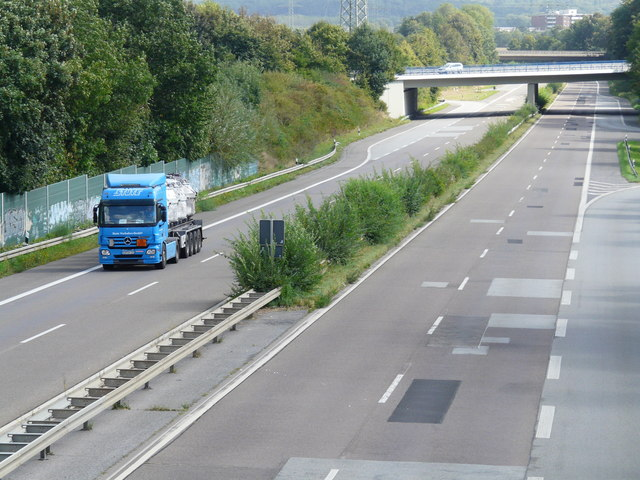

Route information
- Existed: 1831–present

Location
- Country: Germany
- States: North Rhine-Westphalia

Highway system
- Roads in Germany; Autobahns; List; Federal; List; State; E-roads

Bundesstrasse 59 or B 59 is a federal highway in Germany the state of North Rhine-Westphalia. It runs from Mönchengladbach to Cologne and ends there at the Hohenzollernring, a section of the Cologne rings.

== History ==
Road construction between the neighboring cities of Mönchengladbach and Rheydt began in 1831. Around ten years later, in 1840, the adjacent sections to Viersen and Grevenbroich were built.

From 1934 this line was called Reichsstraße 59 until it was renamed Bundesstraße 59.

Originally the B 59 ran through the localities of Rommerskirchen, Stommeln and Pulheim, the street name "Venloer Straße" still bears witness to this fact today. As early as 1992, however, the B 59n was realized as a bypass road for Stommeln. In 2006 the B 59n gap between Pulheim and the Cologne-Bocklemünd motorway junction (A 1) was closed after around three years of construction.

On January 1, 2007, the section between Mönchengladbach and Viersen was rededicated as a state road.

The Sinsteden bypass was officially opened on October 1, 2019.

At the beginning of 2020, the A 540 between Jüchen and Grevenbroich was downgraded to the federal highway and as such follows the route of the B 59.

== See also ==
- List of federal highways in Germany
