= Bundesstraße 7 =

Highway in Germany

B 7
- Bundesstraße 7

Route information
- Length: 530 km (330 mi)

Major junctions
- West end: Dutch border at Venlo
- A 52
- East end: Rochlitz near Chemnitz

Location
- Country: Germany
- States: North Rhine-Westphalia, Hesse, Thuringia, Saxony

Highway system
- Roads in Germany; Autobahns; List; Federal; List; State; E-roads

The Bundesstraße 7 (abbr. B7) is a German federal highway (Bundesstraße) that stretches from the Dutch border at Venlo in the West to Rochlitz near Chemnitz in the East. It is approximately 530 km (330 mi) long. Because of its western origin some stretches of the B 7 are designated as "Holländische Straße" (Dutch Road), e.g., in Kassel and Calden.

== History ==
The former Reichsstraße 7 extended from Schmölln over Meerane, Glauchau, Chemnitz and Freiberg to Dresden, where it linked with the Reichsstraße 6. The former portion between Chemnitz and Dresden is now called the Bundesstraße 173.

The segment between Wuppertal and Hagen was constructed in 1788 (238 years ago), making it one of the oldest roads in western Germany. The stretch connecting Iserlohn and Menden was built between 1816 and 1817 (209 years ago).

Between Eisenach and Erfurt the B 7 follows the path of the former Via Regia. The original plan marked Dresden as he eastern terminus, however this portion was completed during the Third Reich and called the Bundesstraße 173.

== New Developments ==
In some areas the Bundesstraße 7 is replaced by Autobahns. For example, between Hagen-Hohenlimburg and the former autobahn terminus in the eastern city of Iserlohn the B 7 becomes the Bundesautobahn 46. Also, between Kassel and Eisenach the B 7 is slated to be replaced by the new Bundesautobahn 44, the first piece of which was opened at Hessisch Lichtenau was in October 2005. Environmental concerns have been raised about the project, as the autobahn is proposed to run through the national park Meißner-Kaufunger Wald.

Since August 2005 heavy transport vehicles have been banned from a 157 km (98 mi) stretch of the B 7. The ban applies for a year and is enforced between Kassel at the A 7 junction and Wehretal. Vehicles originating or ending in the Kassel area are exempt from the ban.

== Junction lists ==
Legend:

- I/C - Interchange, I/S - Intersection, RSA - Rest and service area, OBR - Overhead bridge restaurant, R/R - Restaurant and rest plaza, L/B - Layby, V/P - Vista point, TN - tunnel, T/P - Toll plaza, BR - Bridge
- C - Cloverleaf, S - Stack, T-A - Trumpet-A, T-B - Trumpet-B, DT - Directional-T/Y, SDT - Semi-Directional-T/Y, P-Y - Partial-Y, D - Diamond, P-C - Partial cloverleaf, D-D - Diverging diamond, D-R - Direct ramp

(14)	Büderich A 52
	Neuss
	Düsseldorf
	Düsseldorf-Oberkassel
BR	Theodor-Heuss Bridge
	Düsseldorf-Kennedydamm B 1 B 8
	Düsseldorf-Mörsenbroich B 1 B 8
	Düsseldorf-Düsseltal
	Düsseldorf-Grafenberg
(18)	Mettmann A 3
	Wuppertal-Vohwinkel B 224
(11)	Wuppertal-Dornap A 535 B 224
	Wuppertal-Elberfeld-West
	Wuppertal-Elberfeld
	Wuppertal-Barmen
	Wuppertal-Oberbarmen
(93)	Wuppertal-Langerfeld A 1
	Schwelm B 483
	Ennepetal
	Gevelsberg
	Hagen B 54
(44)	Hagen-Elsey A 46
replaced by A 46
(45)	Iserlohn-Letmathe B 236
(46)	Iserlohn-Oestrich B 236
(48)	Iserlohn-Seilersee B 233
(49)	Hemer A 46
	Hemer
	Menden (Sauerland) B 515
	Wickede-Wimbern
(62)	Arnsberg-Neheim A 46
replaced by A 46
(71)	Bestwig A 46
	Bestwig
	Brilon B 480 B 251
	Marsberg
(63)	Marsberg A 44
	Scherfede B 68 B 252
	Warburg B 252
	Hesse
	Calden
	Anschluss B 83
	Espenau
	Vellmar
	Nieder-Vellmar
	Kassel B 251 B 3 B 83
(78)	Kassel-Ost 3-way interchange A 7
	Kaufungen
	Helsa B 451
(74)	Helsa-West
(75)	Helsa-Ost
(76)	Hessisch-Lichtenau-West
(77)	Hessisch Lictenau-Mitte
(78)	Hessisch Lichtenau-Ost
(79)	Waldkappel
(80)	Eschwege
(81)	Ringgau B 7 B 27
	Free State of Thuringia
	Ifta
	Junction B 250
	Creuzburg
	Krauthausen-Deubachshof B 7a
(39a)	Eisenach-West A 4
Re-routed to the A4 since 2006, in 2011 the old A4 becomes the B19
Replaced by A 4 B 247
	Gotha B 247
(11)	Erfurt-Bindersleben A 71
A 71
(7)	Erfurt-Nord A 71
	Erfurt
	Mönchenholzhausen
	Weimar B 85
	Umpferstedt B 87
	Jena B 88
(22)	Eisenberg A 9
A 9 A 4
(60)	Ronneburg A 4
	Schmölln
	Altenburg B 180 B 93
	Free State of Saxony
	Frohburg B 95
(23)	Geithein A 72
	Geithain
	Rochlitz B 107 B 175

== See also ==
- List of federal highways in Germany
