= E331 =

E331 may refer to:

- European route E331, which is a part of Bundesautobahn 44
- E331 series, a former electric multiple unit (EMU) used for commuter services
- E331, the E number of the salt forms of sodium citrate
