= Bundesautobahn 44 =

Federal motorway in Germany

Coordinates: 51°14′49″N 9°36′45″E

A 44
- Bundesautobahn 44

Route information
- Length: 274.6 km (170.6 mi) (planned: 330.3 km)

Major junctions
- From: Aachen
- B 258
- To: Kassel

Location
- Country: Germany
- States: North Rhine-Westphalia, Hesse, (planned Thuringia)

Highway system
- Roads in Germany; Autobahns; List; Federal; List; State; E-roads
← A 43	→ A 45

Bundesautobahn 44 (translates from German as Federal Motorway 44, short form Autobahn 44, abbreviated as BAB 44 or A 44) is a German Autobahn. It consists of three main sections and a few smaller sections. It begins in Aachen at the German–Belgian border (Belgian motorway A3) and ends near Kassel (Bundesautobahn 7). Before German unification it was a regional motorway. In the 1990s, it became an integral part of the German motorway system. The A 44 is a heavily-used link between the Rhine-Ruhr-Area and the new German states, especially Thuringia, and also eastern European states like Poland.

== History of construction ==
The first section of this motorway to open was the connection between Aachen and the Aachen interchange in 1963.

=== Auxiliary runway for military aircraft ===
The Geseke-Büren section was constructed as an auxiliary runway. This section is even and straight, without any constructions like bridges and the crash-barriers can be taken out. It was constructed to be a runway for US-military aircraft in the event of war with NATO's opponent, the Warsaw Pact. At both ends of the section there are parking lots for parking and maintenance of the aircraft.

== International E-road network ==
The Lichtenbusch-Aachen interchange section is part of the European route E 40. Between the Dortmund-Unna and Kassel-Süd (Kassel south) interchanges, the A 44 is part of the European route E 331.

== Constructions ==
=== Neersen Interchange ===
Neersen Interchange is a typical cloverleaf interchange.

After the opening of the Flughafenbrücke near Düsseldorf Airport, the connections to and from the A 52 were extended. Since the opening, two ramps have been closed. If you enter the network at Mönchengladbach-Ost, you cannot change directly to the Roermond-bound direction of A 52. If you approach from Krefeld, you cannot change directly to the Düsseldorf-bound direction. To reactivate these connections, two new bridges are necessary. Construction has been in progress since January 2006. When construction is complete, the interchange will have the following connections:

==== Connections from A 44 to A 52 ====
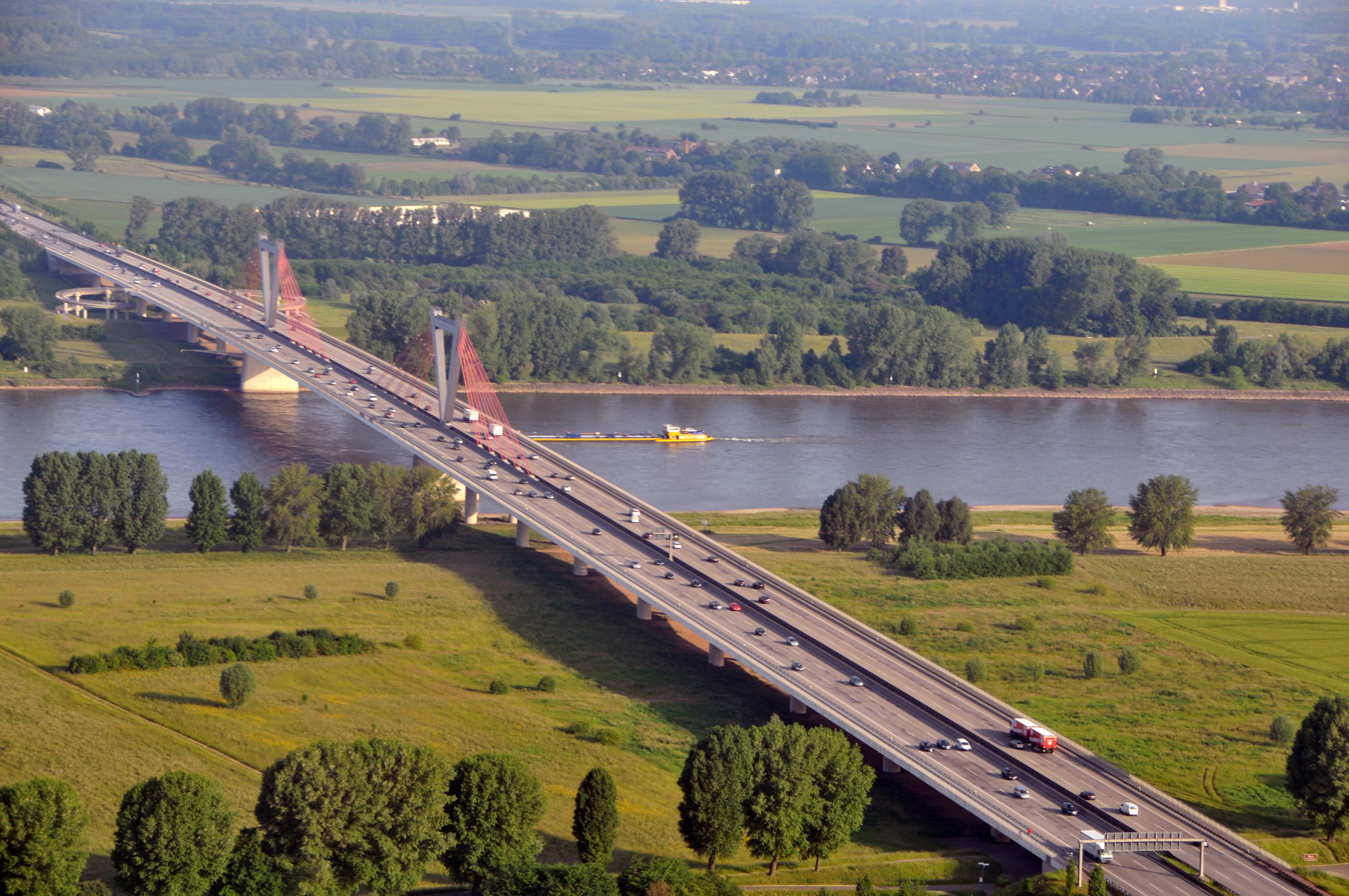
Flughafenbrücke ("airport bridge") across the Rhine between Krefeld and Düsseldorf Airport

Direction	Type of connection
Mönchengladbach–Düsseldorf	Tangential ramp
Krefeld–Roermond	Tangential ramp
Mönchengladbach–Roermond	Using the ramp Mönchengladbach–Düsseldorf and via the northwestern loop
Krefeld–Düsseldorf	Loop (270°)

==== Connections from A 52 to A 44 ====
Direction	Type of connection
Düsseldorf–Mönchengladbach	Loop (270°)
Roermond–Krefeld	A bridge over the A 44 will be constructed.
Roermond–Mönchengladbach	Loop (270°)
Düsseldorf–Krefeld	Tangential ramp

== Plans ==
=== Extension near Kassel ===
Near Kassel, the Autobahn will be extended to Thuringia. The following sections are planned:

Section	Status	Length (km)	Cost (€ millions)
interchange Kassel-Ost – jct Helsa-Ost	project investigations	17.5	287
jct Helsa-Ost - jct Hessisch Lichtenau-West	Opened 7 October 2022	5.9	327
jct Hessisch Lichtenau-West – jct Hessisch Lichtenau-Mitte	Opened 24 July 2014	2.2	85
jct Hessisch Lichtenau-Mitte – jct Hessisch Lichtenau-Ost	Opened 6 October 2005	4.4	84
jct Hessisch Lichtenau-Ost - Walburg–Hasselbach	Opened 13th April 2018	4.3	83
Walburg-Hasselbach – jct Waldkappel-Ost	Opened 13th April 2018	6.1	56
jct Waldkappel-Ost - Wehretal/Hoheneiche	Under construction. Expected opening 2025	7.2	183
Wehretal/Hoheneiche - jct Sontra-Nord	Under construction. Expected opening 2025	5.4	159
jct Sontra-Nord - jct Sontra-Ulfen	Under construction. Expected opening 2025	11.0	240
jct Sontra-Ulfen – interchange Wommen (A 4)	Under construction. Expected opening 2025	5.8	75

=== Demolition of a section ===
The interchange Jackerath-interchange Holz section and the Otzenrath junction were permanently closed to traffic on 14 October 2005. The reason for the closure was the open mine at Garzweiler II. Before this section was closed, the Bundesautobahn 61 was widened from two to three lanes in each direction. For the closed junction, the junction Mönchengladbach-Wanlo was constructed.

When the open cast mine was exhausted, expected in 2017, a new section of the A 44 was built across the A 61. This new route is built to the south of the old route, and the new junction Jackerath is now located south of the old one.

This section was taken out of the official network-register in November 2005 and is no longer officially a Bundesautobahn.

== Exit list ==
Legend:

- I/C - Interchange, I/S - Intersection, RSA - Rest and service area, OBR - Overhead bridge restaurant, R/R - Restaurant and rest plaza, L/B - Layby, V/P - Vista point, TN - tunnel, T/P - Toll plaza, BR - Bridge
- C - Cloverleaf, S - Stack, T-A - Trumpet-A, T-B - Trumpet-B, DT - Directional-T/Y, SDT - Semi-Directional-T/Y, P-Y - Partial-Y, D - Diamond, P-C - Partial cloverleaf, D-D - Diverging diamond, D-R - Direct ramp

A3 E40		Belgium
	(1)	Border crossing Lichtenbusch
		Services Lichtenbusch
	(2)	Aachen-Lichtenbusch B 258
	(3)	Aachen-Brand
	(4)	Aachen 4-way interchange A 4 E314 E40 A 544
	(5a)	Broichweiden
	()	Alsdorf-Begau (access in direction Aachen only)
	(5b)	Alsdorf (Rheinland)
	(6)	Aldenhoven B 56
	(7)	Jülich-West B 56
		Raststätte Ruraue
		Rurbrücke
	(8)	Jülich-Ost B 55
	(9)	Titz
	(10)	Jackerath 3-way interchange A 61
	(11)	Holz 3-way interchange A 46
	(12)	Mönchengladbach-Odenkirchen
interrupted (not required)
	(21)	Mönchengladbach-Ost
	(22)	Neersen 4-way interchange A 52
	(incl.)	Neersen (touches B 7)
	(23)	Münchheide
	(24)	Krefeld-Forstwald
	(25)	Krefeld-Fichtenhain
	(26)	Osterath
	(27)	Meerbusch 4-way interchange A 57
	(28)	Lank-Latum
		Tunnel Strümp 640 m
		Tunnel Ilvericher Altrheinschlinge 870 m
		Flughafenbrücke 1.287 m
	(29)	Düsseldorf-Messe/Stadion
	(30)	Düsseldorf-Stockum B 8
		Tunnel Flughafentunnel 1070 m
	(31)	Düsseldorf-Flughafen
		Bahnbrücke 60 m
		Kreuz Düsseldorf-Nord (planned) A 59
	(32)	Düsseldorf-Nord 4-way interchange A 52
		Tunnel Schwarzbach 154 m / 150 m
	(32)	Düsseldorf-Nord 4-way interchange A 52
Intersection		3-way interchange Rath (planned) A 59
		Tunnel Reichswaldallee 695 m / 725 m (planned)
	(incl.)	Reichswaldallee
		Tunnel Volkardey 695 m / 725 m
	(33)	Ratingen-Schwarzbach
	(34)	Kreuz Ratingen-Ost 4-way interchange A 3 E35
		Talbrücke Kaltenbach 129 m
		Talbrücke Homberger Bachtal 216 m
		-
	(35)	Heiligenhaus
		Talbrücke Laubecker Bachtal 206 m
		Talbrücke Ganslandsiepen 194 m
	(36)	Heiligenhaus-Hetterscheid
		Tunnel Birth 807 m / 814 m
	(37)	Velbert-Nord B 224
	(37a)	Velbert-Nord 3-way interchange A 535
		Talbrücke Hespersbach
	(38)	Velbert-Langenberg
		Asbachtalbrücke 323 m
	(39)	Essen-Kupferdreh
		Hochstraßebrücke 540 m
	(40)	Essen-Überruhr
		Ruhr
	(41)	Essen-Heisingen
		Essen-Bergerhausen (planned)
		Tunnel Ruhralleetunnel 2500 m (planned)
		Kreuz Essen-Bergerhausen (planned) A 52
interrupted (further need)
		Tankstelle -
	(52)	Dortmund/Unna 4-way interchange A 1 E37 E331
		Talbrücke Bornekamp
	(53)	Unna-Ost 4-way interchange A 443
		Talbrücke Kessebürenbach
		Talbrücke Lüner Bach
		Services Am Haarstrang
	(54)	Werl 4-way interchange A 445
	(55)	Werl-Süd im Bau
		Talbrücke Ostönner Bach
	(56)	Soest
		Services Soester Börde
	(57)	Soest-Ost
	(58)	Erwitte/Anröchte
		Talbrücke Pöppelsche
		Talbrücke Schledde
		Talbrücke Westerschledde
	(59)	Geseke
	(60)	Büren
		Almebrücke
		Talbrücke Friedenstal
	(61)	Wünnenberg-Haaren 4-way interchange A 33
		Talbrücke Ottensgrund 500 m
	(62)	Marsberg-Meerhof
		Talbrücke Langer Grund 200 m
		Talbrücke Apfelbaumgrund 350 m
		Talbrücke Krügersgrund 375 m
		Talbrücke Klingenbach 480 m
		Talbrücke Heubach 200 m
		Diemeltalbrücke 100 m
		Services Am Biggenkopf
	(64)	Diemelstadt
	(65)	Warburg
		Twistetalbrücke 650 m
		Talbrücke Breuna 650 m
	(66)	Breuna
		Services Bühleck
	(67)	Zierenberg
	(68)	Kassel-Wilhelmshöhe
	(69)	Kreuz Kassel-West A 49
		Fuldatalbrücke 700 m
	(70)	Dreieck Kassel-Süd A 7 E45
	Under construction	Rest area Kassel (under construction)
Intersection		3-way interchange Kassel-Mitte A 49
		Talbrücke Losse 200 m
Intersection		3-way interchange Dreieck Kassel-Ost (planned) A 7
		Kaufungen (planned)
		Helsa-West (planned)
	(75)	Helsa-Ost
		Tunnel Hirschhagen 4100 m
		Steinbachtalbrücke 134 m
	(76)	Hessisch Lichtenau-West B 7
		Tunnel Schulberg 700 m
	(77)	Hessisch Lichtenau-Mitte B 487
		Tunnel Hopfenberg 650 m }
		Hopfenbachtalbrücke 280 m
		Tunnel Walburgtunnel 273 m/284 m
		Wehretalbrücke 530 m
	(78)	Hessisch Lichtenau/Walburg
		Tunnel Küchentunnel 1314 m
		Beerbergbrücke 176 m
		Rauschenbrücke 233 m
	(79)	Waldkappel B 7
		Tunnel TrimbergTunnel 597 m
		Eschwege (under construction)
		Wehretalbrücke 695 m
		Tunnel Spitzenbergtunnel 626 m
		Netratalbrücke 264 m (planned)
		Ringgau (planned)
		Ulfetalbrücke 205 m (planned)
		Tunnel Boyneburgtunnel 1698 m (planned)
		Sontra-Nord (planned)
		Tunnel Holsteintunnel 1647 m (planned)
		Sontra-Ost (planned)
		WC (planned)
		Tunnel Bubenradtunnel 686 m (planned)
		Talbrücke Lindenau 550 m (planned)
		Talbrücke Rübenberg 100 m (planned)
		Talbrücke Kulmrich 100 m (planned)
		Tunnel Dachslochtunnel 300 m (planned)
		Talbrücke Riedmühle 300 m (planned)
		Talbrücke Blankenbach 200 m (planned)
		Sontra-Ulfen (planned)
		Tunnel Armsbergtunnel 290 m (planned)
		Talbrücke Breitzbach 172 m (planned)
Intersection		3-way interchange Wommener Dreieck (planned) A 4 (planned / urgent need)
