= Bundesstraße 231 =

Federal highway in Germany

B 231
- Bundesstraße 231

Route information
- Length: 11 km (6.8 mi)

Major junctions
- North end: Duisburg
- A 42 / A 516
- South end: Essen

Location
- Country: Germany
- States: North Rhine-Westphalia

Highway system
- Roads in Germany; Autobahns; List; Federal; List; State; E-roads

The Bundesstraße 231 or B 231 is a German federal highway in North Rhine-Westphalia.

== Route description ==
The B 231 runs from Oberhausen, near CentrO. through the Essen district Borbeck and ends in the Essen Westviertel, leads ahead to the inner city.

== History ==
Until the year-end 2006, the route led to Duisburg. The formerly part between Duisburg-Wanheimerort (Grunewald) via Duisburg-Dümpten and Oberhausen-Alstaden to the current starting point has been downgraded to a road (in German: Landstraße) and now it has been renamed to Landstraße 1 (shortcut: L 1). The part between Frintrop and the Westviertel has a tram connection (Line 105) within.

== Junction lists ==
Legend:

- I/C - Interchange, I/S - Intersection, RSA - Rest and service area, OBR - Overhead bridge restaurant, R/R - Restaurant and rest plaza, L/B - Layby, V/P - Vista point, TN - tunnel, T/P - Toll plaza, BR - Bridge
- C - Cloverleaf, S - Stack, T-A - Trumpet-A, T-B - Trumpet-B, DT - Directional-T/Y, SDT - Semi-Directional-T/Y, P-Y - Partial-Y, D - Diamond, P-C - Partial cloverleaf, D-D - Diverging diamond, D-R - Direct ramp

Oberhausen	
Mülheimer Str. / Sterkrader Str.	B 223 A 42 A 516
Osterfelder Str. (CentrO)	A 42
Essen	
Aktienstr.	A 40
Hans-Böckler-Str.	B 224

== See also ==
- List of federal highways in Germany (in English)
- List of federal highways in Germany (in German)
