= Bundesautobahn 49 =

Federal motorway in Germany

A 49
- Bundesautobahn 49
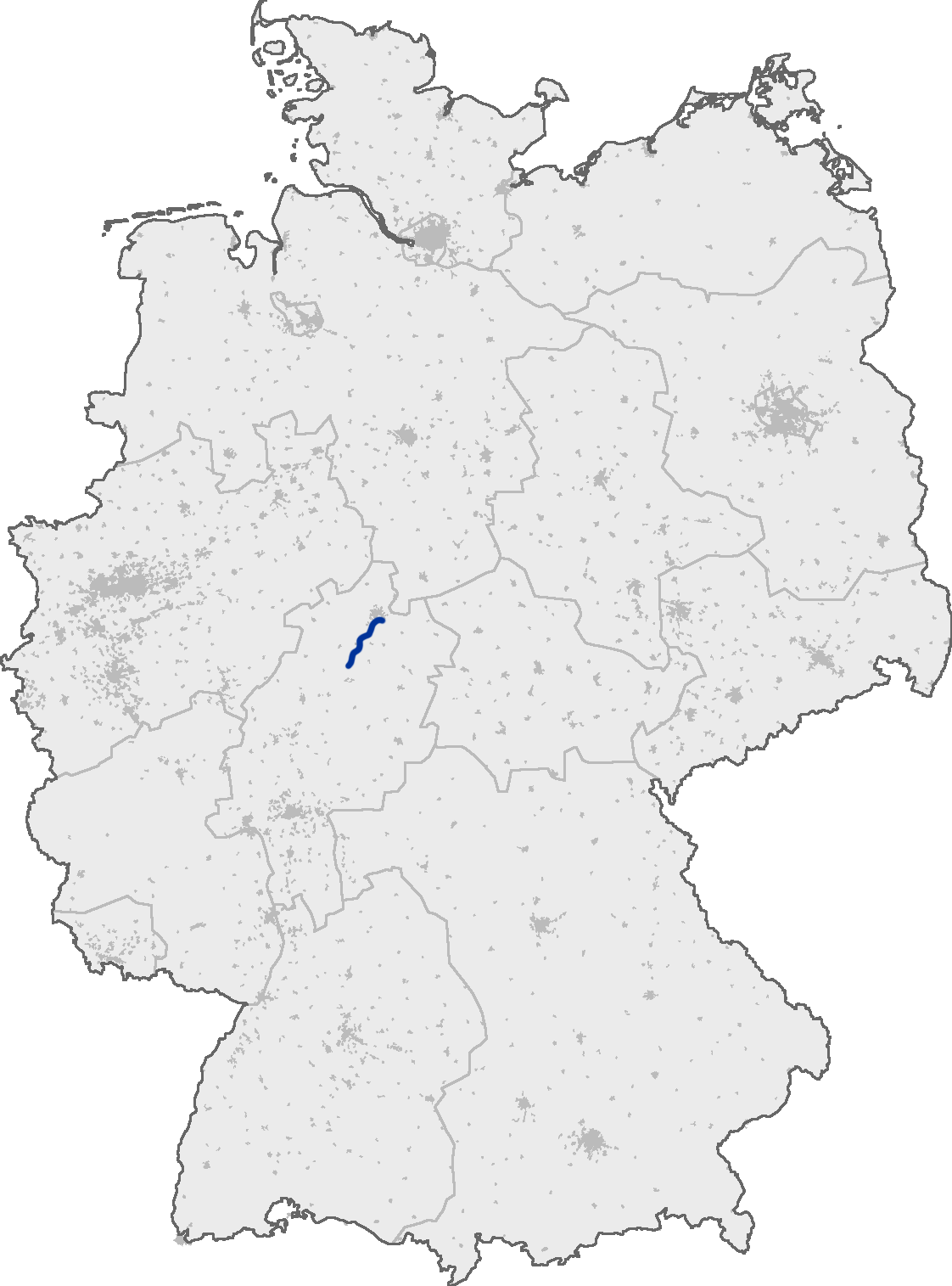

Route information
- Length: 86.9 km (54.0 mi)

Location
- Country: Germany
- States: Hesse

Highway system
- Roads in Germany; Autobahns; List; Federal; List; State; E-roads
← A 48	→ A 52

Bundesautobahn 49 (translates from German as Federal Motorway 49, short form Autobahn 49, abbreviated as BAB 49 or A 49) is a federal motorway running through north Hesse. It connects Kassel with Fritzlar, Schwalmstadt, Stadtallendorf and Homberg (Ohm) and connects with the A5 at the Ohmtaldreieck interchange. It offers an alternative and shorter route to the often heavily used A7 via the Hattenbacher interchange.

== Course ==
A 49 splits off from A 7 at Kreuz Kassel-Mitte and continues as a city motorway through Kassel to Baunatal over the river Fulda. It then continues through the communities of Edermünde, Gudensberg, Fritzlar, Wabern, Borken and Neuental in the Schwalm-Eder region.

After Borken the Ems, Eder and Schwalm rivers are crossed via bridges and viaducts, with the Schwalm being crossed over twice.

The southernmost stretch then continues via Neustadt (Hessen), Stadtallendorf and Homberg (Ohm) with a rather meandering route. The Autobahn then ends at the Ohmtal interchange where it connects to the A5.

== Exit list ==
	(1)	Am Lohfaldener Rüssel
	(2)	Kasse-Mitte 4-way interchange A 7 E45
	(3)	Kassel-Industriepark
	(4)	Kassel-Waldau B 83
		Talbrücke Fulda 320 m
	(5)	Kassel-Auestadion B 3
	(6)	Kassel-Niederzwehren
	(7)	Kassel-West 4-way interchange A 44 E331
	(8)	Baunatal-Nord
	(9)	Baunatal-Mitte
	(10)	Baunatal-Süd
		Tankstelle Holzhausen
	(11)	Edermünde
	(12)	Felsberg B 256
		Rest area Scharfenstein/Am Sonnenborn
	(13)	Gudensberg
		Ems
	(14)	Fritzlar
		Ederbrücke 140 m
		Bahn-und Straßenbrücke 50 m
	(15)	Wabern B 253
	(16)	Borken (Hessen) B 3
		Talbrück Schwalm (1) 180 m
		Talbrück Schwalm (2) 100 m
	(17)	Neuental
		Goldbachtalbrücke 285 m
		Schlierbachtalbrücke 170 m
		Grünbrücke 50 m
		Todenbachtalbrücke 259 m
		Katzenbachtalbrücke 252 m
		Tunnel Frankhain 899 m
		Schwalmstadt (under construction)
		Talbrücke Biedenbacher Teiche 200 m (planned)
		Kreuz Schwalmstadt (planned) A 4
		Rest area Kälbachtal (planned)
		Kälbachtalbrücke 300 m (planned)
		Rest area Kälbachtal (planned)
		Neustadt (planned) (Hessen)
		Stadtallendorf-Nord (planned) B 454
		Joßkleintalbrücke 350 m (planned)
		Stadtallendorf-Süd (planned) B 62
		Gleentalbrücke 460 m (planned)
		Homberg (planned) (Ohm)
Intersection		3-way interchange Ohmtal (planned) A 5 E50

== Latest extension ==
For decades, there were wranglings over the 42.5 km extension of the A 49 from Neuental southwards towards the A5.

The planning approval procedure for the section between Stadtallendorf and A 5 should have been completed by 2004. The A 49 was originally intended to run through the Herrenwald forest to the east of Stadtallendorf. However, after conservationists discovered a population of Great Crested Newts there, the stretch through the forest became problematic, and plans were changed so that the motorway would run even further east around the forest.

The planning approval procedure for the section from the Baunatal was approved in September 2007 by the planning approval committee, but financing from the government remained a sticking point and delayed construction. This section was originally estimated to cost 183 million euro. The German branch of Friends of the Earth filed a suit against the planned extension in January 2008 before the Federal Administrative Court in Leipzig. However, the A 49 extension was declared immediately executable by federal law, so the complaint could not halt the possible construction work. In April 2009, BUND withdrew its complaint.

The A 49 was originally supposed to follow a different course: from Kassel past Fritzlar, Schwalmstadt, Stadtallendorf, Kirchhain and Marburg to Gießen. Near Marburg, the A 49 would flow into the current state road 3, which has been upgraded to a freeway. From Gießen, the A 49 would have continued past Butzbach, Bad Nauheim and Friedberg to Frankfurt am Main, crossing Federal motorway 5 just past Butzbach. From Preungesheimer Dreieck, the A 49 would have followed the route of the current A 661 past Offenbach am Main and Egelsbach to Darmstadt, where it was supposed to end at A 5 south of the city.

Several sections of the original A 49 have been constructed with different names: the four-lane section of Federal road 3 between Marburg and the Gießen North interchange, between Karben and the Preungesheimer Dreieck, Bundesautobahn 485 between the Gießener Nordkreuz and Butzbach, and Bundesautobahn 661 between the Preungesheimer Dreieck and Egelsbach.

Constructions built for the A 49 extension, such as the Egelsbach junction and a service station near Dreieich, have been dismantled. The proposed easterly by-pass of Darmstadt has been abandoned due to nature conservation issues.
