= Bundesautobahn 535 =

Federal motorway in Germany

A 535
- Bundesautobahn 535

Route information
- Length: 13.5 km (8.4 mi)

Major junctions
- North end: Velbert
- South end: Sonnborn

Location
- Country: Germany
- States: North Rhine-Westphalia

Highway system
- Roads in Germany; Autobahns; List; Federal; List; State; E-roads

Bundesautobahn 535 (translates from German as Federal Motorway 535, short form Autobahn 535, abbreviated as BAB 535 or A 535) is an autobahn in Germany.

The first section of the highway was built in 1973, along with the construction of the A 46 through the area. The freeway ran between the A 46 and B 7, a distance of 2 km; it was signed upon completion as the B 224n. Until the tunnel Großer Busch was completed in 1990, this was the shortest stretch of autobahn-standard freeway in Germany. The tunnel connected the short stretch of freeway to a longer one (current A 535 junctions 1 to 4). The freeway was not officially signed as an autobahn, however, until 1 September 2007.

A planned extension of the A 535 across the Ruhr towards Essen and the A 52 was classified as "urgent" in the latest Bundesverkehrswegeplan (Federal Transport Infrastructure Plan). The project was completed on 1 January 2010. However, the new stretch of autobahn was instead designated as part of the A 44.

== Exit list ==
(1)	Velbert-Nord 3-way interchange A 44 B 224
(2)	Velbert
(3)	Tönisheide
(4)	Wülfrath
(5)	Wuppertal-Dornap B 7 B 224
(6)	Sonnborner Kreuz 4-way interchange A 46 B 228
