= Bundesstraße 224 =

Federal highway in Germany

B 224
- Bundesstraße 224

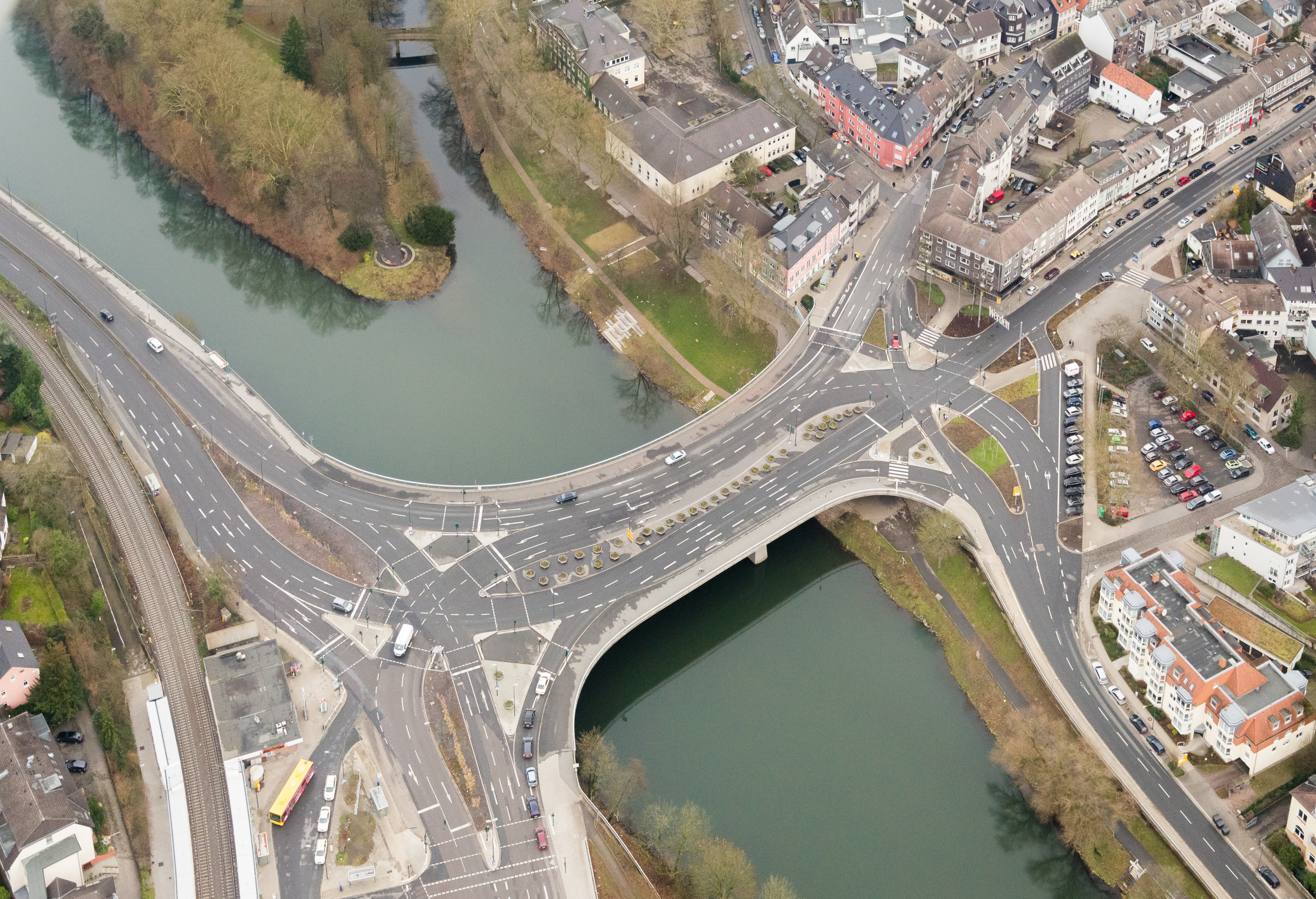

Route information
- Length: 83 km (52 mi)

Major junctions
- North end: Raesfeld
- South end: Solingen

Location
- Country: Germany
- States: North Rhine-Westphalia

Highway system
- Roads in Germany; Autobahns; List; Federal; List; State; E-roads

The Bundesstraße 224 or B 224 is a German federal highway in North Rhine-Westphalia.

== Route description ==
The B 224 runs from Raesfeld in southern Münsterland through the city of Gelsenkirchen in the Ruhr area and Essen in the Bergische Land, and ending in Solingen.

From the Gelsenkirchen-Hassel junction the B 224 continues on the A 52, which ends shortly before Gladbeck and continues as the B 224.

After joining with the A 44 at the Velbert-Nord interchange, the B 224 becomes concurrent with the A 535, splitting off before the Sonnborner Kreuz interchange, continuing into Solingen, where it continues as the B 229.

== Junction lists ==
The entire route is located in North Rhine-Westphalia.

Legend:

- I/C - Interchange, I/S - Intersection, RSA - Rest and service area, OBR - Overhead bridge restaurant, R/R - Restaurant and rest plaza, L/B - Layby, V/P - Vista point, TN - tunnel, T/P - Toll plaza, BR - Bridge

km	Exit	Name	Destinations
		Raesfeld	B 70
		Raesfeld-Erle	
		Dorsten, Weseler Straße	B 58, zur A 31
		Dorsten-Holsterhausen	
		Dorsten	B 225
		Dorsten-Altendorf/Ulfkotte	
		Replaced by A 52	
		end of motor road	
	44	Gelsenkirchen-Hassel	
	43	Gelsenkirchen-Scholven	
	42	Gelsenkirchen-Buer-West	B 226
		Kraftfahrstraße	
		Gladbeck-Goethestraße	
		Gladbeck-Schützenstraße	
		Essen/Gladbeck	A 2
		Bottrop-Horster Str.	
		Bottrop-Prosperstraße	
		Kraftfahrstraße	
		Essen-Stadthafen	
	13	AS Essen-Nord	A 42
		end of motor road	
		Essen-Altenessen	
		Essen	
		Essen-Grillostraße	
		Essen-Bottroper Str./Universität	
		Essen-Altendorfer Str.	B 231
		Essen-Zentrum	A 40
		Essen-Bismarckstr./Museum Folkwang	
		Essen-Norbertstraße/Messe	
		Essen-Rüttenscheid	A 52
		Essen-Werden	
		Velbert-Birth	
		Velbert-Nord	A 44 A 535
		Replaced by A 535 (sign posted as B 224)	
		Wuppertal-Sonnborn	A 46 A 535 B 228
		Wuppertal-Vohwinkel	
		Gräfrath	Solingen-Gräfrath
		Solingen	B 229

== See also ==
- List of federal highways in Germany
