= Bundesautobahn 516 =

Federal motorway in Germany

A 516
- Bundesautobahn 516

Route information
- Length: 5 km (3.1 mi)

Major junctions
- North end: Sterkrade
- South end: Oberhausen

Location
- Country: Germany
- States: North Rhine-Westphalia

Highway system
- Roads in Germany; Autobahns; List; Federal; List; State; E-roads

Bundesautobahn 516 (translates from German as Federal Motorway 516, short form Autobahn 516, abbreviated as BAB 516 or A 516) is an autobahn in Germany.

The A 516 branches off the A 3 towards the center of Oberhausen. The northern terminus of the A 516 is also the western terminus of the A 2. After a 5 km journey, the autobahn is downgraded to the B 223 just after the junction Oberhausen-Eisenheim, 500 m short of the A 42. This is because the junction with the A 42 is not designed as a free-flowing autobahn-to-autobahn junction; rather, it is essentially a diamond interchange with one folded ramp.

The speed limit for the entirety of the A 516 is 100 km/h. The limit is reduced to 80 km/h nightly between 22:00 and 6:00. Traffic heading to CentrO on the weekends and around the holiday season regularly creates backups of up to 2 km.

== Exit list ==
A 3		Road continues as the B 3 towards Emmerich
	(1)	Oberhauen A 2 E34 A 3 E35
	(2)	Oberhausen-Sterkrade
		Hochstraße 120 m
	(2a)	Oberhausen-Sterkrade
	(3)	Oberhausen-Eisenheim
End of the motorway		End of the motorway
B 223
		Oberhausen-Grafenbusch
	(10)	Oberhausen-Zentrum A 42
B 223		Road continues as the B 223 towards Oberhausen
