= E993 series =

Japanese experimental train type

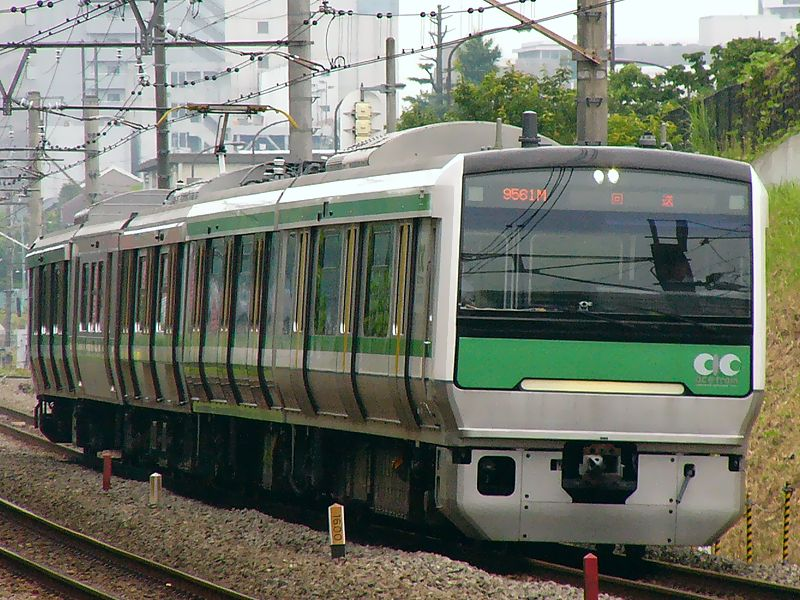
- E993 series train on test, June 2004
- In service: 2002–2006
- Manufacturers: Kawasaki Heavy Industries, Tokyu Car Corporation
- Constructed: 2002
- Scrapped: 2006
- Number built: 5 vehicles (1 set)
- Formation: 5 cars per set
- Capacity: Non-passenger
- Operator: JR East
- Depot: Kawagoe

Specifications
- Car body construction: Stainless steel
- Car length: 16,050 mm (52 ft 8 in) (end cars); 13,000 mm (42 ft 8 in) (intermediate cars)
- Width: 3,000 mm (9 ft 10 in)
- Height: 3,640 mm (11 ft 11 in)
- Floor height: 1,150 mm (3 ft 9 in)
- Doors: 3 pairs per side 2 pairs per side (SaHa E993)
- Maximum speed: 120 km/h (75 mph)
- Power output: 200 kW (270 hp) × 2 per motor car
- Electric systems: 1,500 V DC (overhead catenary)
- Current collection: Pantograph
- UIC classification: 2'2'+Bo'Bo'+Bo'Bo'+2'2'+2'2'
- Safety systems: ATC, ATS-P, ATS-SN
- Track gauge: 1,067 mm (3 ft 6 in)

The E993 series (E993系) "AC Train" was an experimental 5-car electric multiple unit (EMU) train operated by East Japan Railway Company (JR East) in Japan between 2002 and 2006.

== Concept ==
The E993 series "AC Train" ("Advanced Commuter Train") was developed by JR East to test and evaluate a number of new technologies and features for possible use in future commuter train designs. These included features intended to reduce life-cycle costs, improve the interior passenger environment, improve accessibility, and increase environmental friendliness.

== Technological features ==
The train incorporated the following features for evaluation.

- Articulated cars with shared bogies
- Direct drive motors (DDM)
- Double-skin body construction
- Externally slung sliding doors
- Advanced Train Information Management System (AIMS)

== Formation ==
The 5-car articulated set was based at Kawagoe Depot on the Kawagoe Line and formed as shown below, with car 1 at the Kawagoe end, and car 5 at the Shinjuku end. Cars 1 and 2 were built by Kawasaki Heavy Industries in Kobe, and cars 3 to 5 were built by Tokyu Car Corporation in Yokohama.

Car No.	1	2	3	4	5
Designation	Tc'	M'	M	T	Tc
Numbering	KuHa E992-1	MoHa E992-1	MoHa E993-1	SaHa E993-1	KuHa E993-1

Cars 2 and 4 were each fitted with one single-arm pantograph.

Cars 1 and 2 had double-skin aluminium bodies, cars 3 to 5 had stainless steel bodies with double-skin construction used for cars 3 and 5.

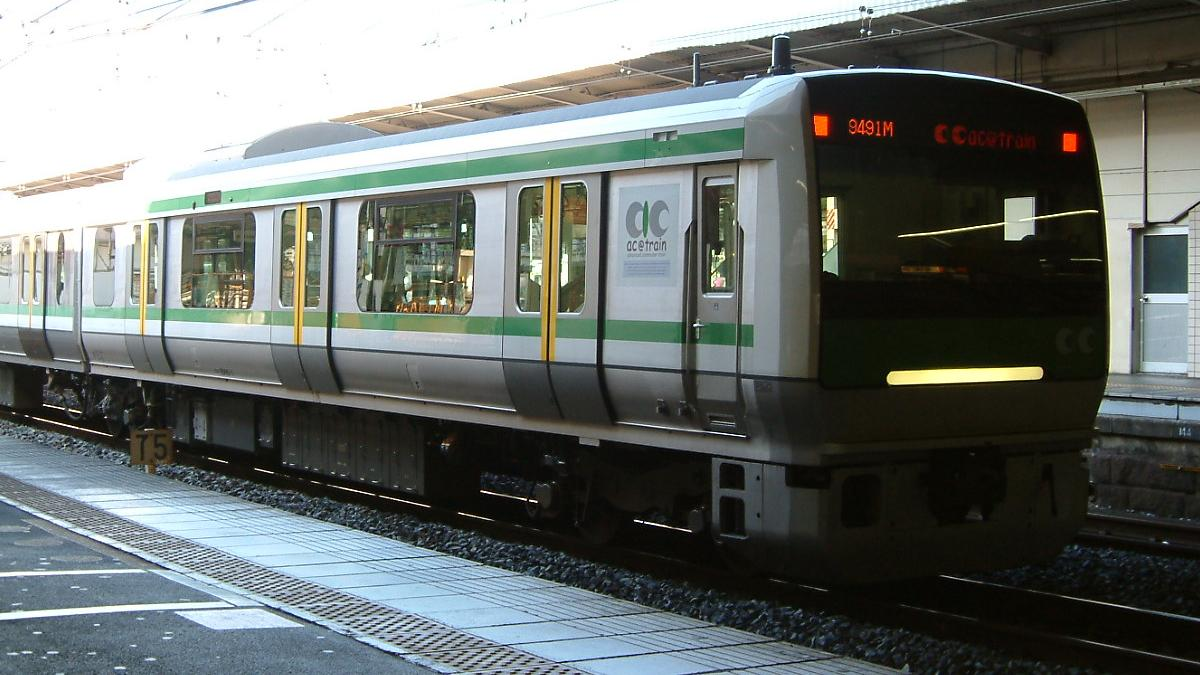
KuHa E992-1

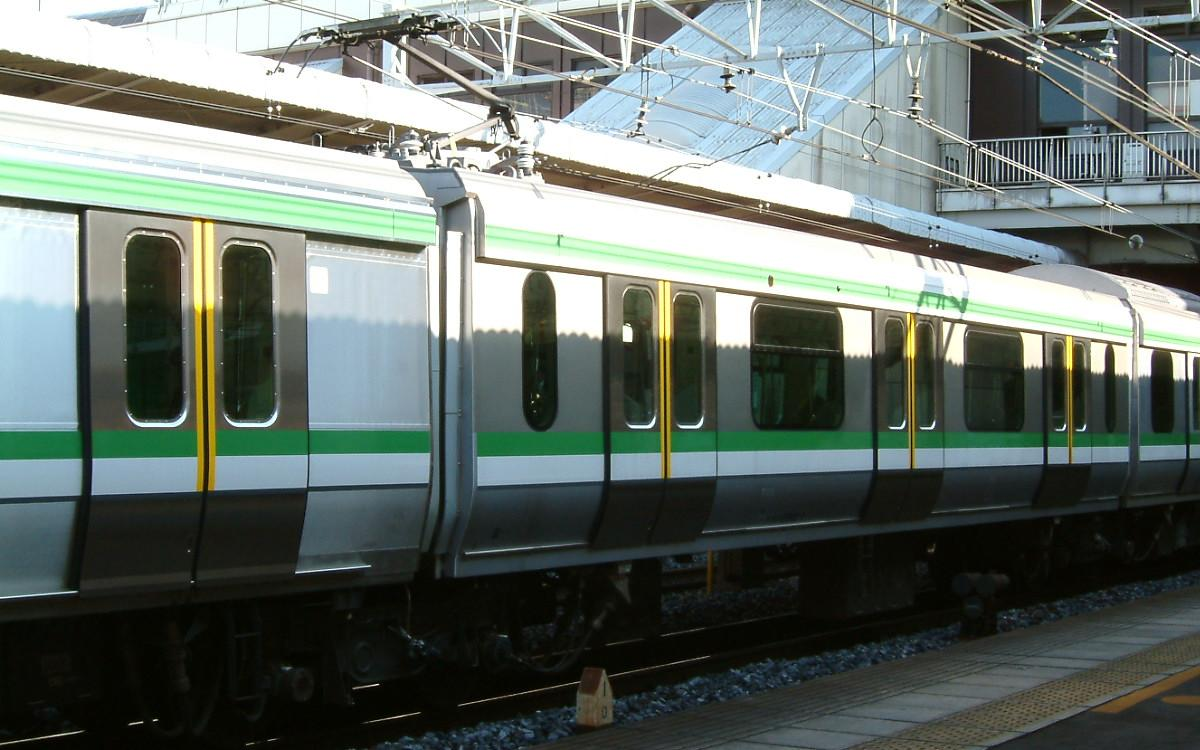
MoHa E992-1

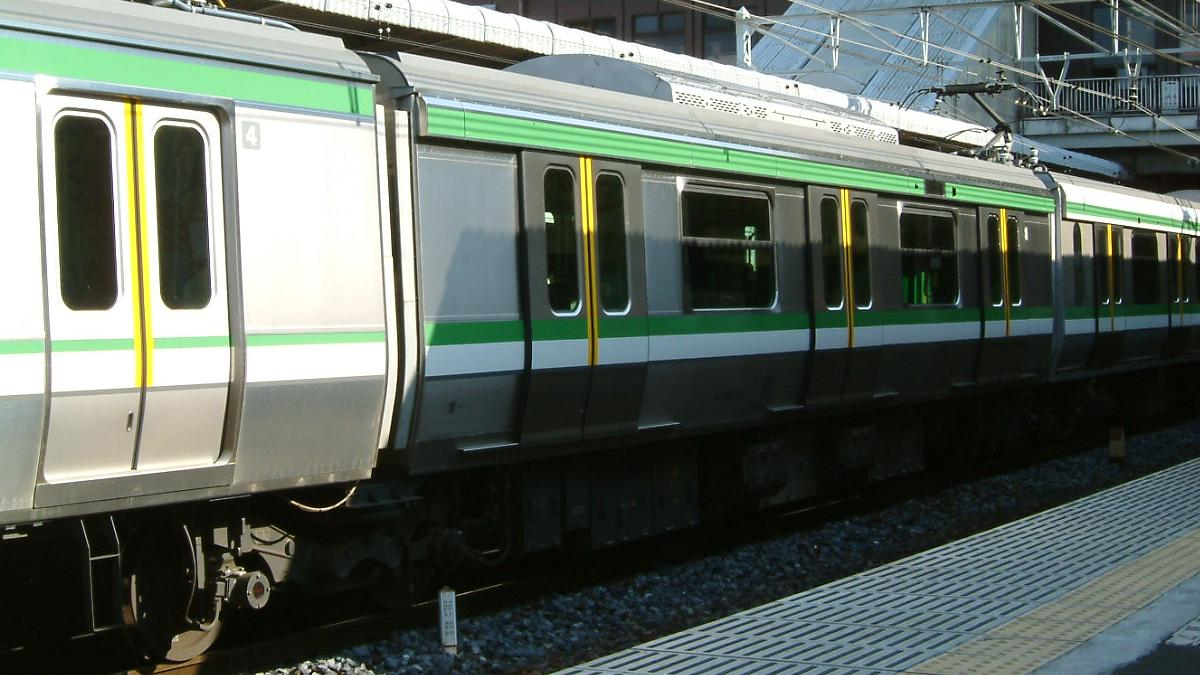
MoHa E993-1

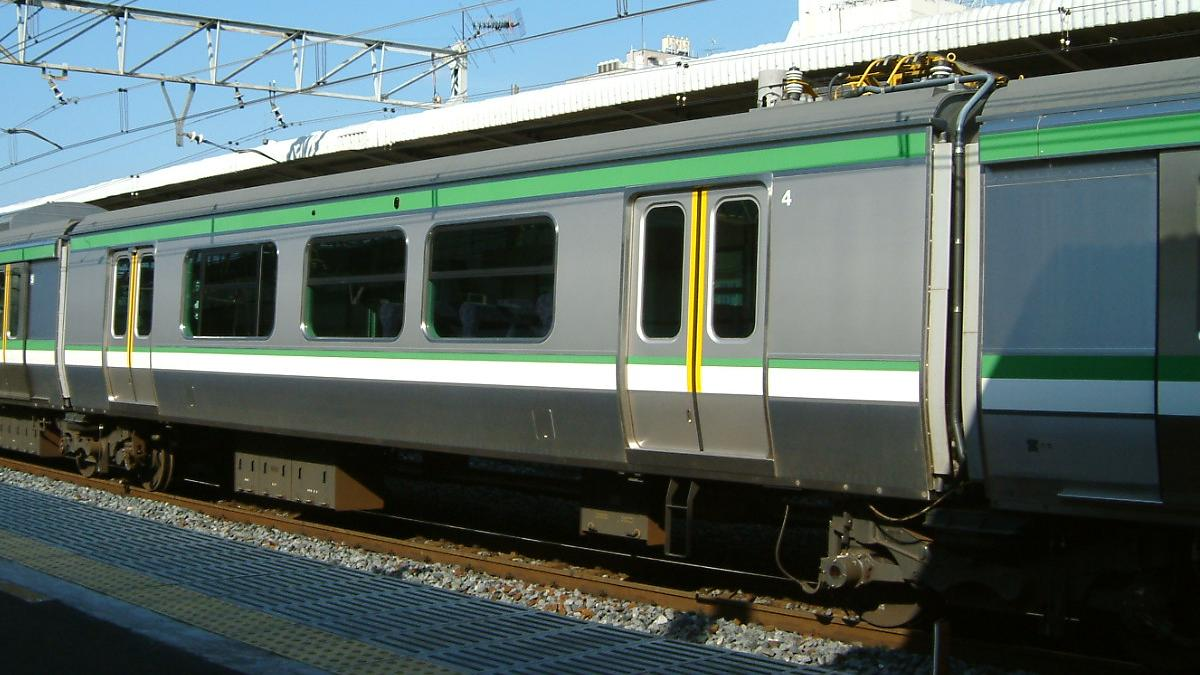
SaHa E993-1

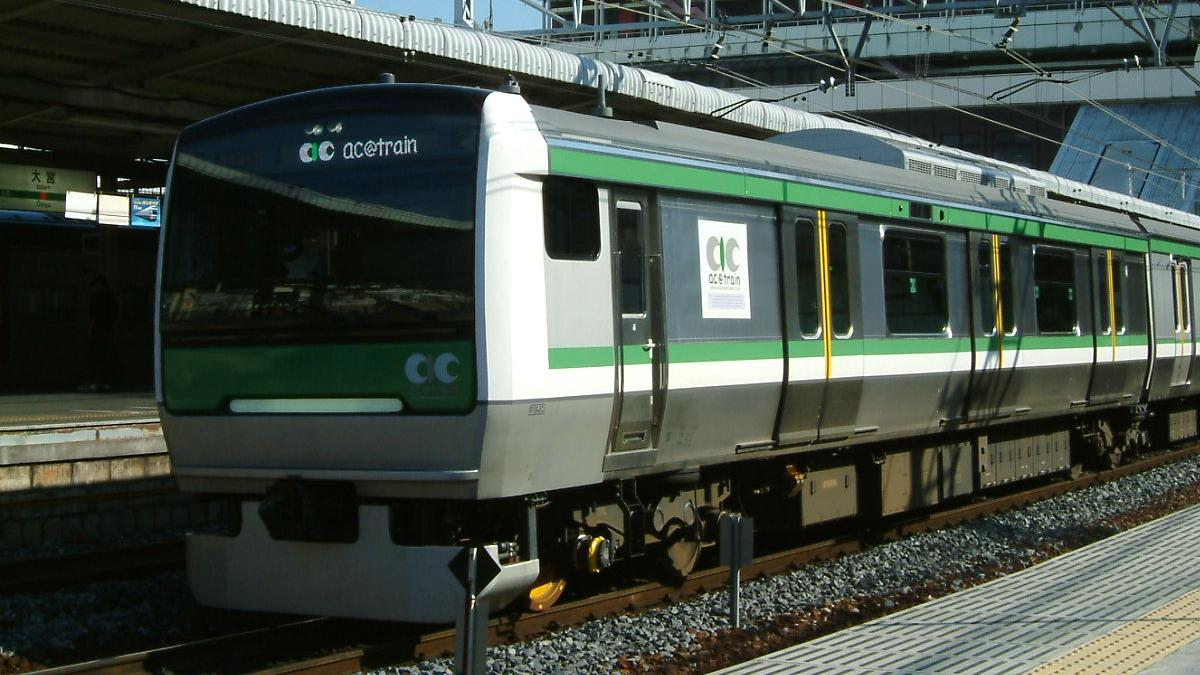
KuHa E993-1

== History ==
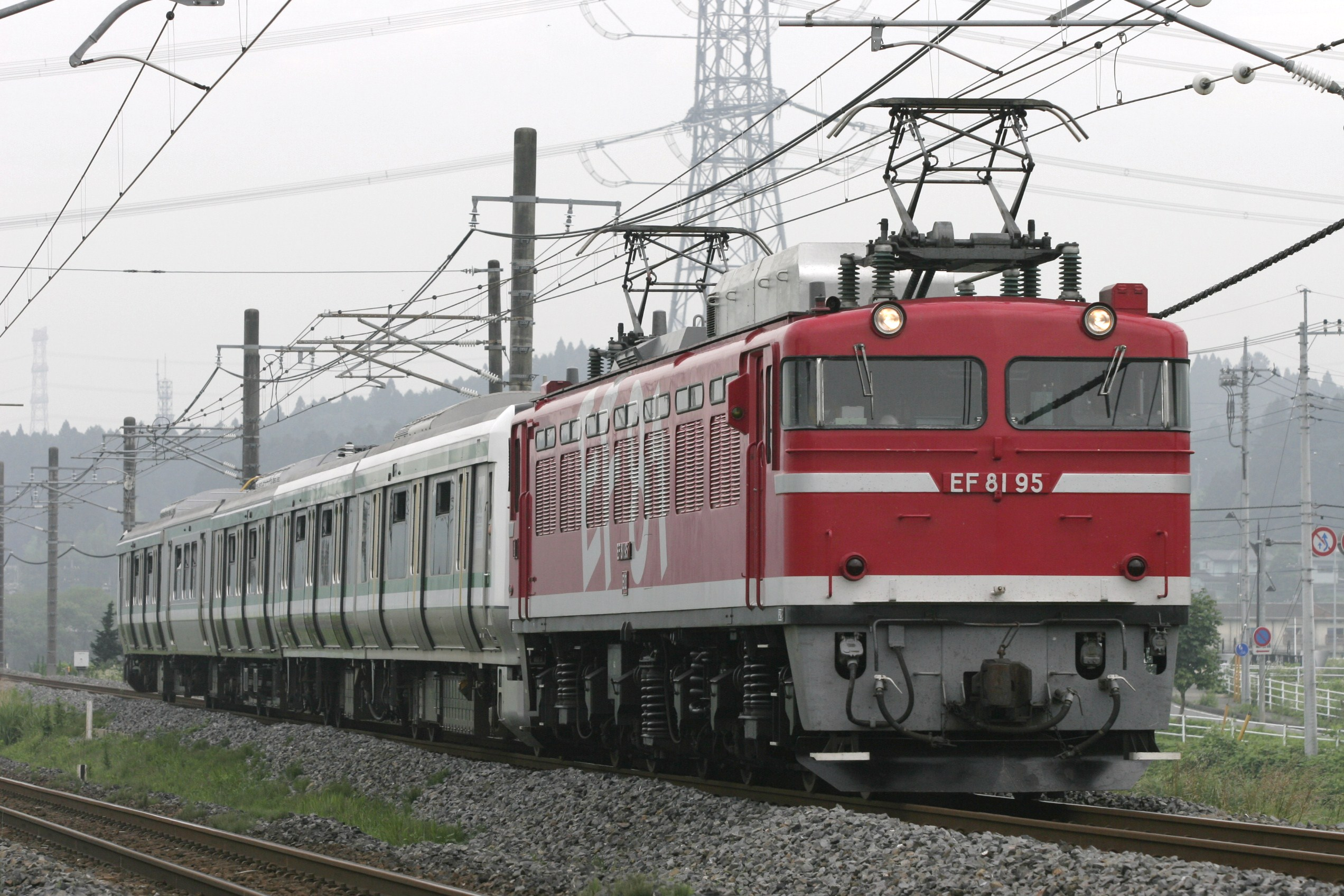
The E993 series train being hauled to Koriyama Works for scrapping, July 2006

The train was delivered to JR East's Kawagoe Depot on 17 January 2002. Test running commenced on the Kawagoe Line and Saikyo Line the following month.

The train was officially withdrawn on 14 July 2006. No cars are preserved.

Features tested on the E993 series, including articulated cars and direct drive motors, were subsequently incorporated in the E331 series prototype train delivered in 2006.
