= Philipp Rottwilm =

German politician (born 1984)

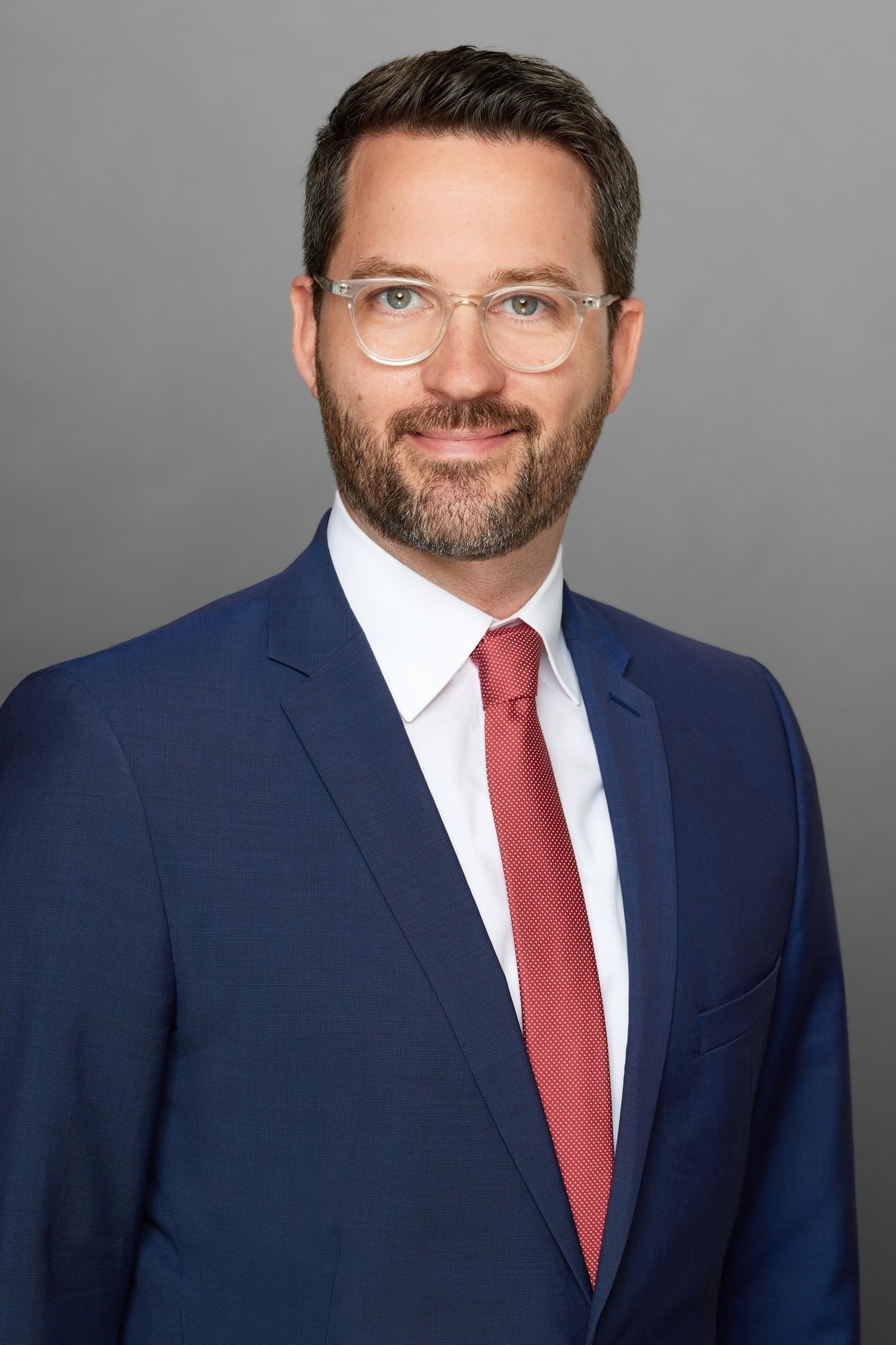

Member of the Bundestag
- Incumbent
- Assumed office 25 March 2025
- Constituency: Hesse

Personal details
- Born: 28 August 1984 (age 41)
- Party: Social Democratic Party

Philipp Rottwilm (born 28 August 1984) is a German politician who was elected as a member of the Bundestag in 2025. He has served as mayor of Neuental since 2018.
