= Neuental =

- Municipality
- Coat of arms

- Location of Neuental within Schwalm-Eder-Kreis district
- Interactive map of Neuental
- Location within Germany Location within Hesse
- Coordinates: 51°00′N 09°13′E
- Country: Germany
- State: Hesse
- Admin. region: Kassel
- District: Schwalm-Eder-Kreis

Government
  - Mayor (2023–29): Dr. Philipp Rottwilm (SPD)

Area
  - Total: 38.65 km^{2} (14.92 sq mi)
- Elevation: 185–433 m (607–1,421 ft)

Population (2025-12-31)
  - Total: 3,019
  - Density: 78.11/km^{2} (202.3/sq mi)
- Time zone: UTC+01:00 (CET)
  - Summer (DST): UTC+02:00 (CEST)
- Postal codes: 34599
- Dialling codes: 06693
- Vehicle registration: HR
- Website: www.neuental.de

Neuental is a municipality in the Schwalm-Eder district in Hesse, Germany.

== Geography ==
Neuental lies in the Schwalm river valley between Borken and Schwalmstadt south of Kassel.

=== Constituent communities ===
The community consists of the eight centres of Bischhausen, Dorheim, Gilsa, Neuenhain, Römersberg, Schlierbach, Waltersbrück, and Zimmersrode (administrative seat).

== History ==
The community came into being as part of Hesse's municipal reforms with the amalgamation of the formerly independent communities of Bischhausen, Dorheim, Gilsa, Neuenhain, Römersberg, Schlierbach, Waltersbrück and Zimmersrode into a new greater community of Neuental.

== Politics ==
=== Municipal council ===
Neuental municipal council is made up of 23 councillors.

- SPD 9 seats
- CDU 8 seats
- Bürgerliste (citizens' coalition) 4 seats
- FDP 2 seats

(as of municipal elections held on 26 March 2006)

The current mayor is Dr. Philipp Rottwilm (SPD), elected in 2017.

== Economy and infrastructure ==
=== Transport ===
Federal Highway (Bundesstraße) B 254 (Homberg – Fulda) runs 7 km to the east. The Neuental interchange on Autobahn A 49 (Kassel – Fritzlar – Marburg) is 3 km away.

== Culture ==
Inclusivity

One of Marburg’s most important institutions is Philipps University. Philipps University has several courses designed for people with disabilities, blind and partially sighted students. Marburg is exceptionally friendly to visually impaired visitors. In addition to Braille city maps, tours for the blind and partially sighted, and a specially adapted.
