= E331 series =

Japanese train type

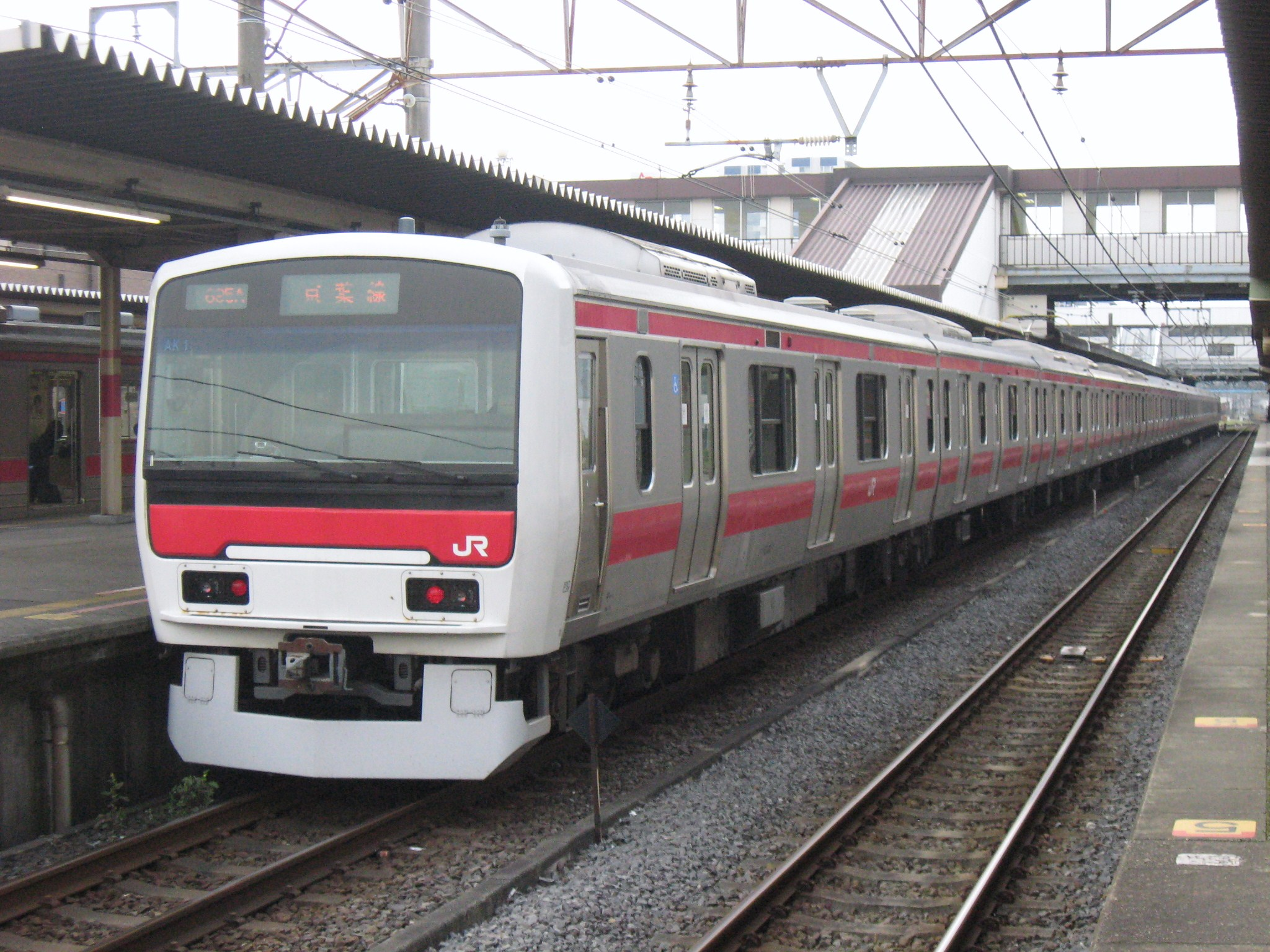
- E331 series set AK1 in service on the Keiyo Line in May 2010
- In service: 2007–2011
- Manufacturers: Kawasaki Heavy Industries, Tokyu Car Corporation
- Constructed: 2006
- Entered service: 18 March 2007
- Scrapped: 2014
- Number built: 14 vehicles (1 set)
- Number scrapped: 14 vehicles
- Successor: E233-5000 series
- Formation: 14 cars per trainset
- Fleet numbers: AK1
- Operator: JR East
- Depot: Keiyo (Shin-Narashino)
- Line served: Keiyo Line

Specifications
- Car body construction: Stainless steel
- Car length: 13.4 m (44 ft 0 in) (cars 2-6, 9-13); 16.5 m (54 ft 2 in) (cars 1, 7, 8, 14)
- Width: 2,989 mm (9 ft 9.7 in)
- Doors: 3 pairs per side
- Maximum speed: 120 km/h (75 mph)
- Traction system: Variable frequency (IGBT)
- Electric systems: 1,500 V DC overhead catenary
- Current collection: PS37 single-arm pantograph
- Bogies: DT73/TR257/TR258
- Safety systems: ATS-P, ATS-SN
- Track gauge: 1,067 mm (3 ft 6 in)

The E331 series (E331系) was an electric multiple unit (EMU) train introduced experimentally from 2007 on commuter services on the Keiyo Line in Japan operated by East Japan Railway Company (JR East). Only one trainset was built, and it differed significantly from other JR commuter EMUs in having articulated cars with shared bogies and using direct-drive motors.

== Bogies ==
The 14-car set was mounted on a total of 16 bogies: four TR257 trailer bogies (cars 1, 7, 8, 14), six TR258 shared trailer bogies, and six DT73 shared motor bogies.

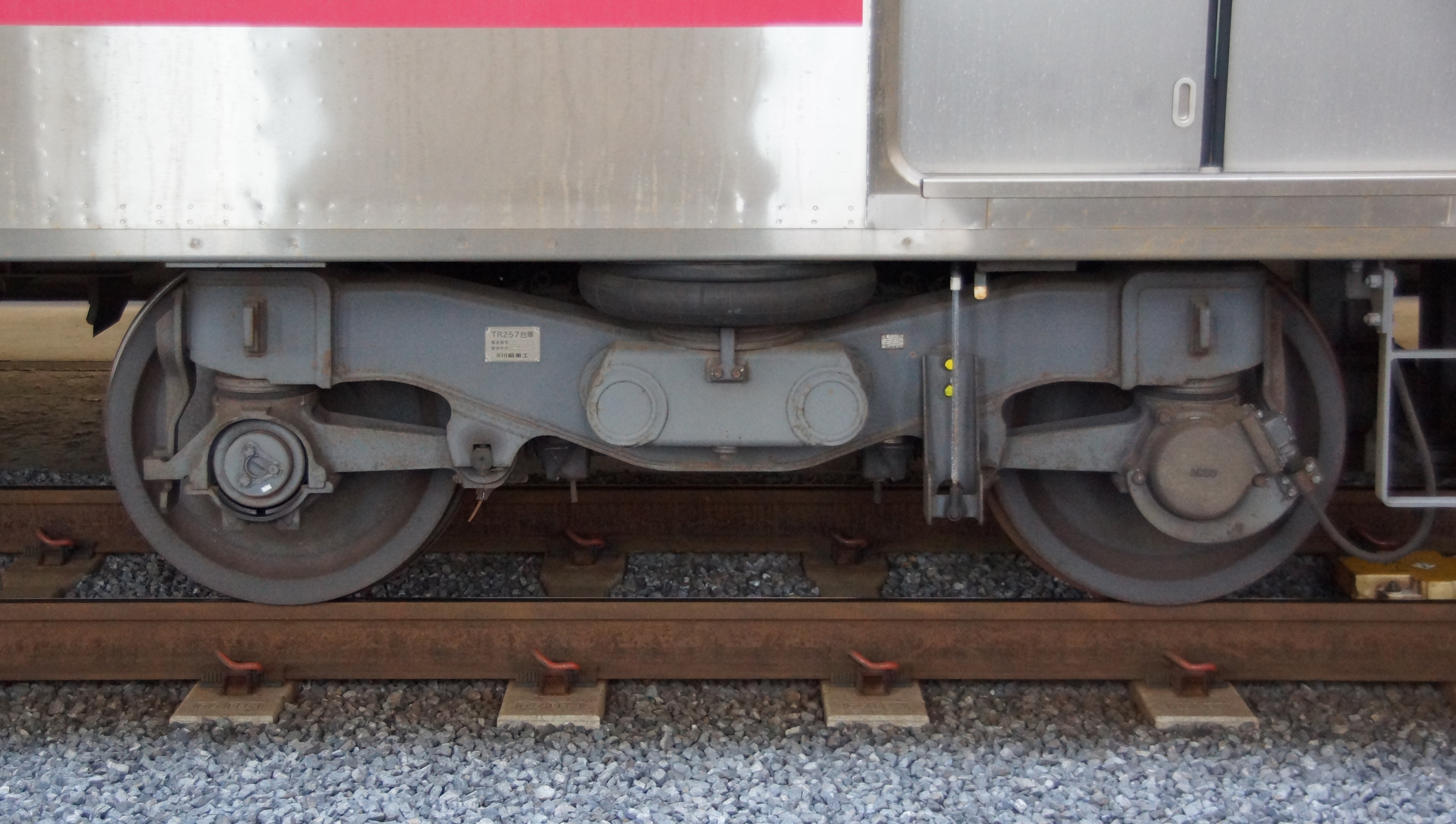
TR257 trailer bogie

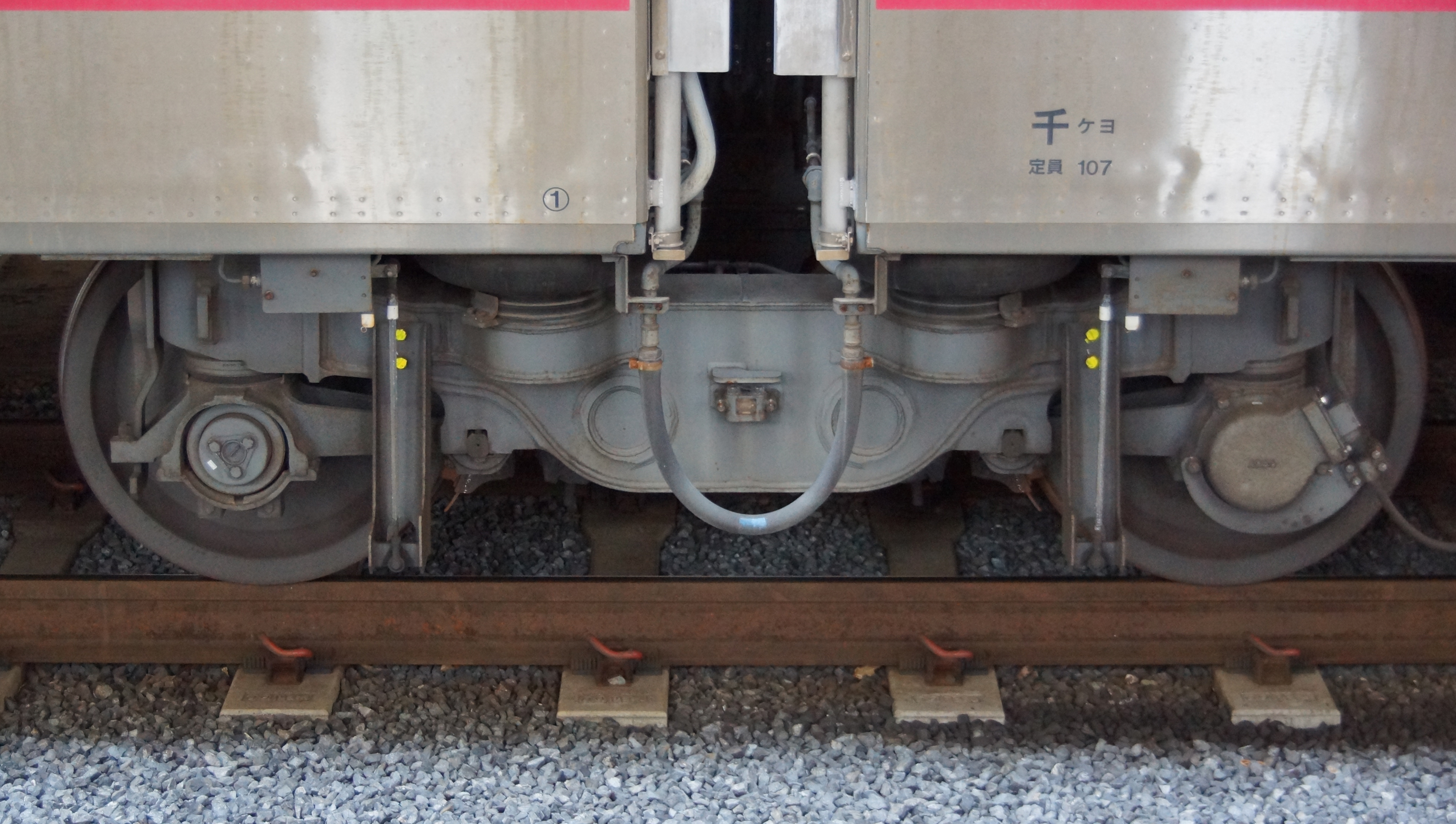
TR258 shared trailer bogie

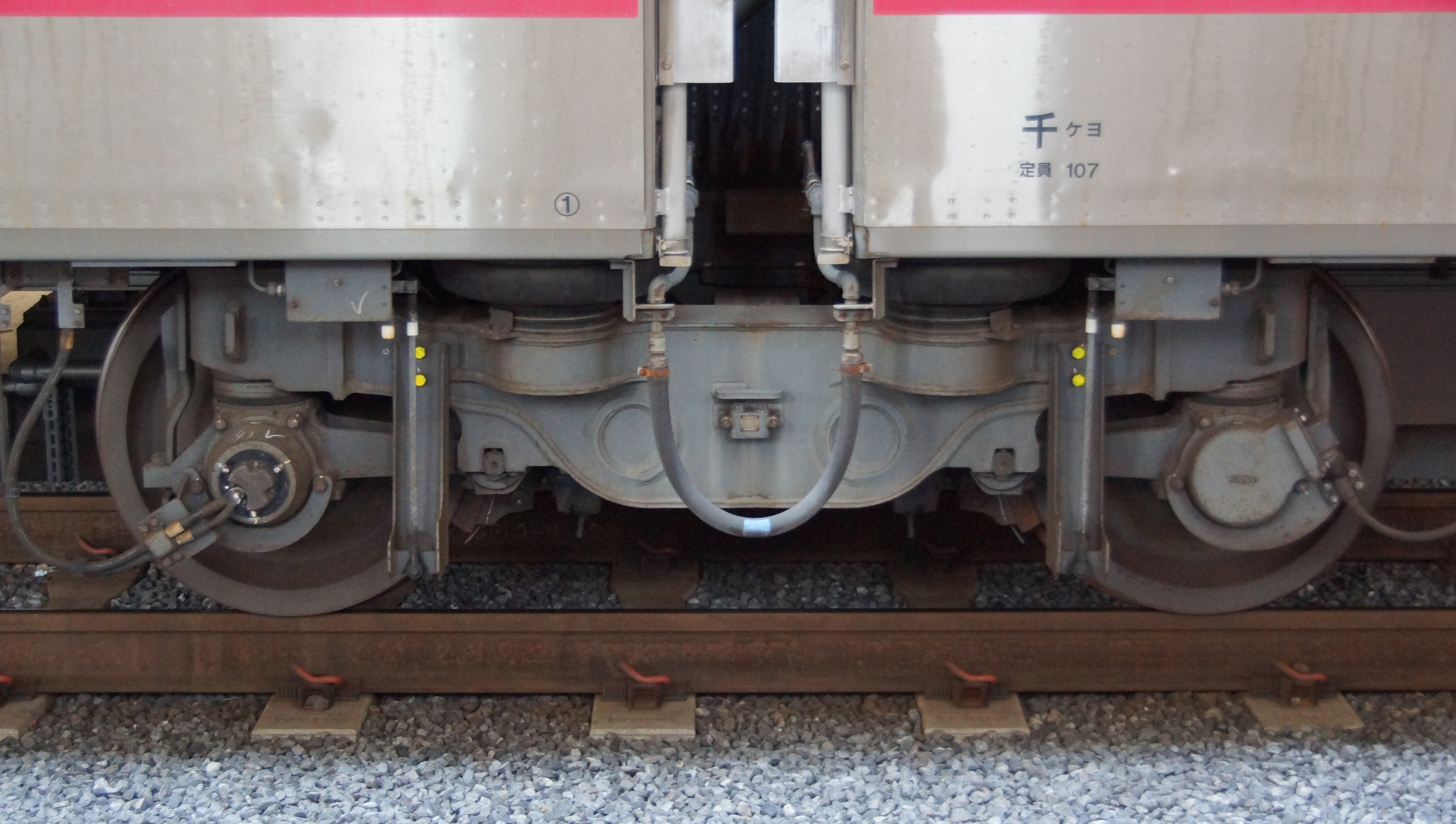
DT73 shared motor bogie

== Formation ==
The lone set, AK1, consisted of two 7-car half-sets, and is formed as follows, with car 1 at the Tokyo end.

Car No.	1	2	3	4	5	6	7	8	9	10	11	12	13	14
Designation	Tc'	M	T2	M	T	M	T4	T3	M	T2	M	T	M	Tc
Numbering	KuHa E330-1	MoHa E331-6	SaHa E331-502	MoHa E331-5	SaHa E331-2	MoHa E331-4	SaHa E331-1001	SaHa E330-1	MoHa E331-3	SaHa E331-501	MoHa E331-2	SaHa E331-1	MoHa E331-1	KuHa E331-1
Weight (t)	25.11	16.1	16.7	16.1	16.5	16.1	20.2	21.5	16.1	16.7	16.1	16.5	16.1	24.11
Capacity (total/seated)	115/34	107/34					133/46		107/34					115/34

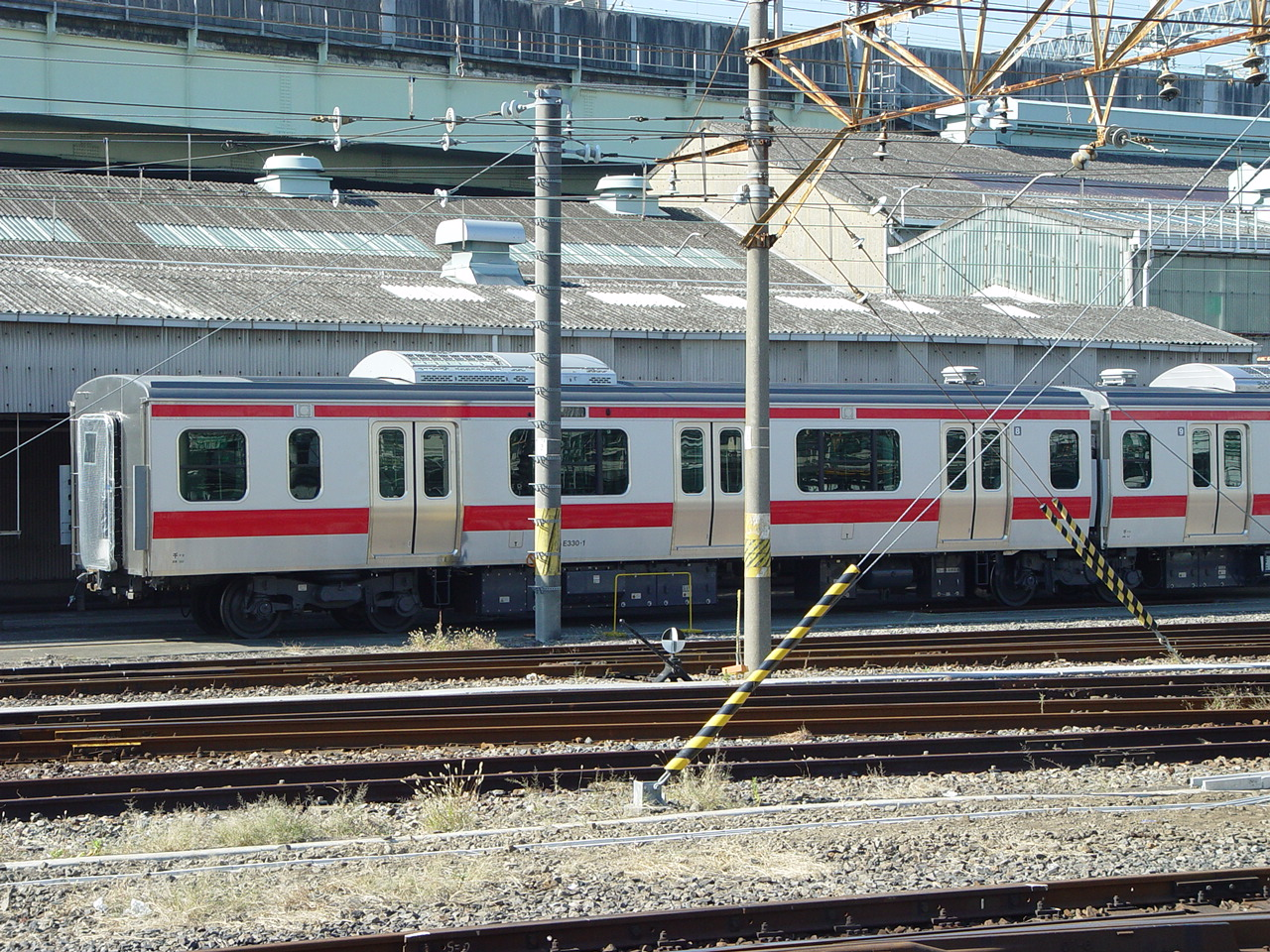
SaHa E330-1 (car 8) in November 2006

- Cars 3 and 10 (SaHa E331-502 and SaHa E331-501) were each fitted with one PS37 single-arm pantograph.
- Cars 1 and 14 seated 36 when the seats are configured in transverse mode.

== Interior ==
Cars 2 to 13 had longitudinal seating, while the end cars 1 and 14 had transverse seating bays which could be rotated and rearranged longitudinally against the train sides to provide increased standing space during peak hours.

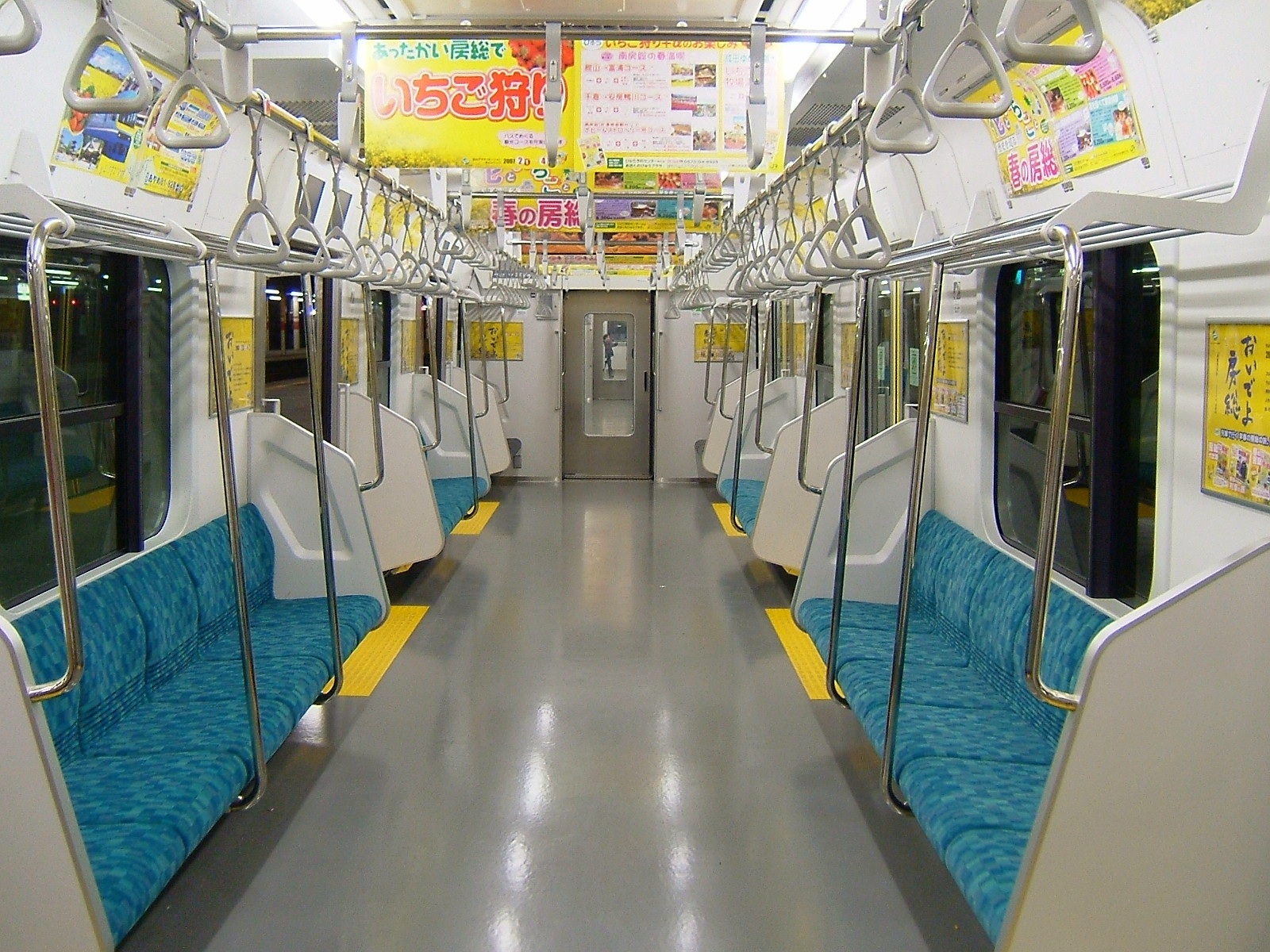
General interior view

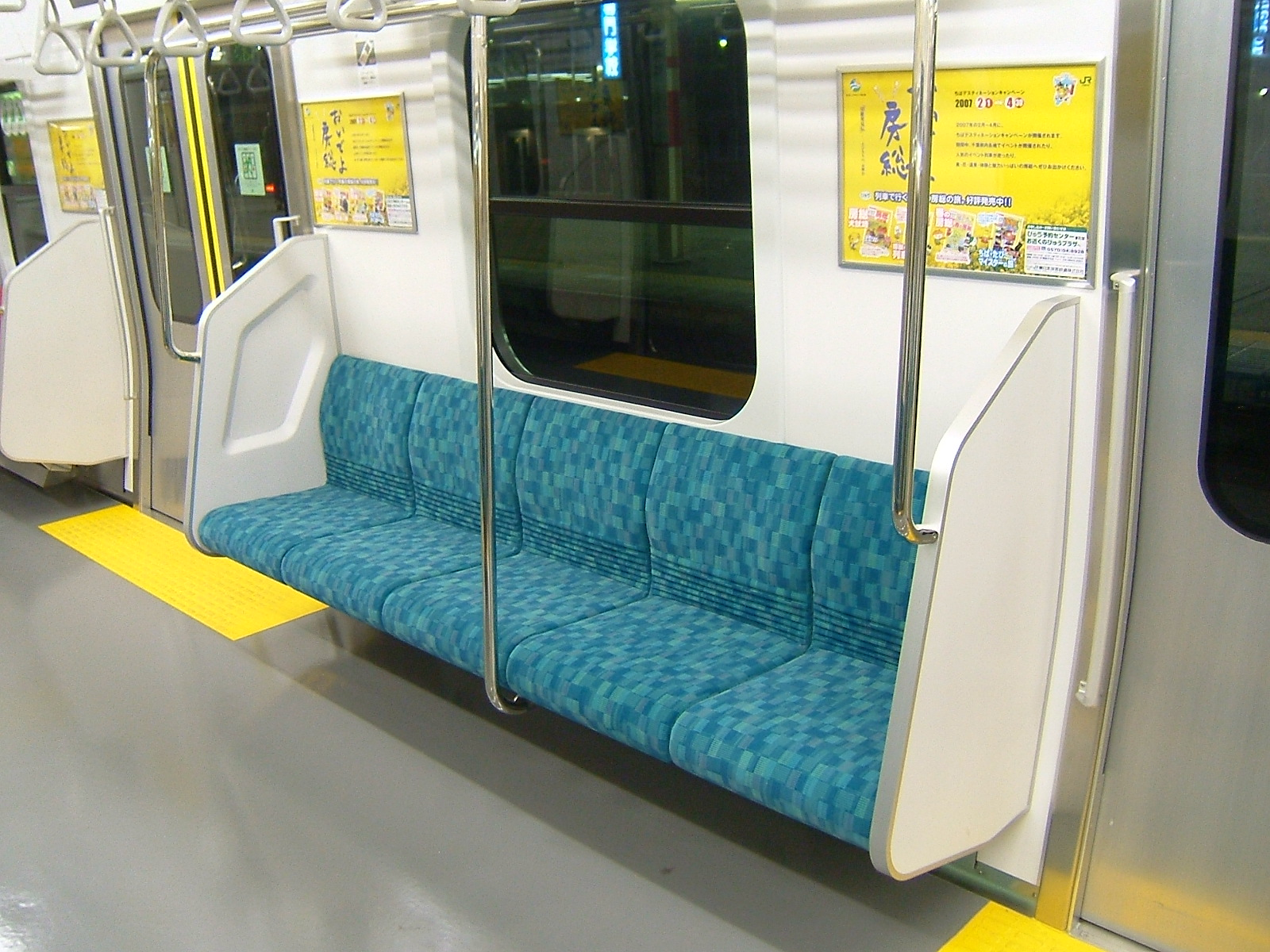
5-person bench seat

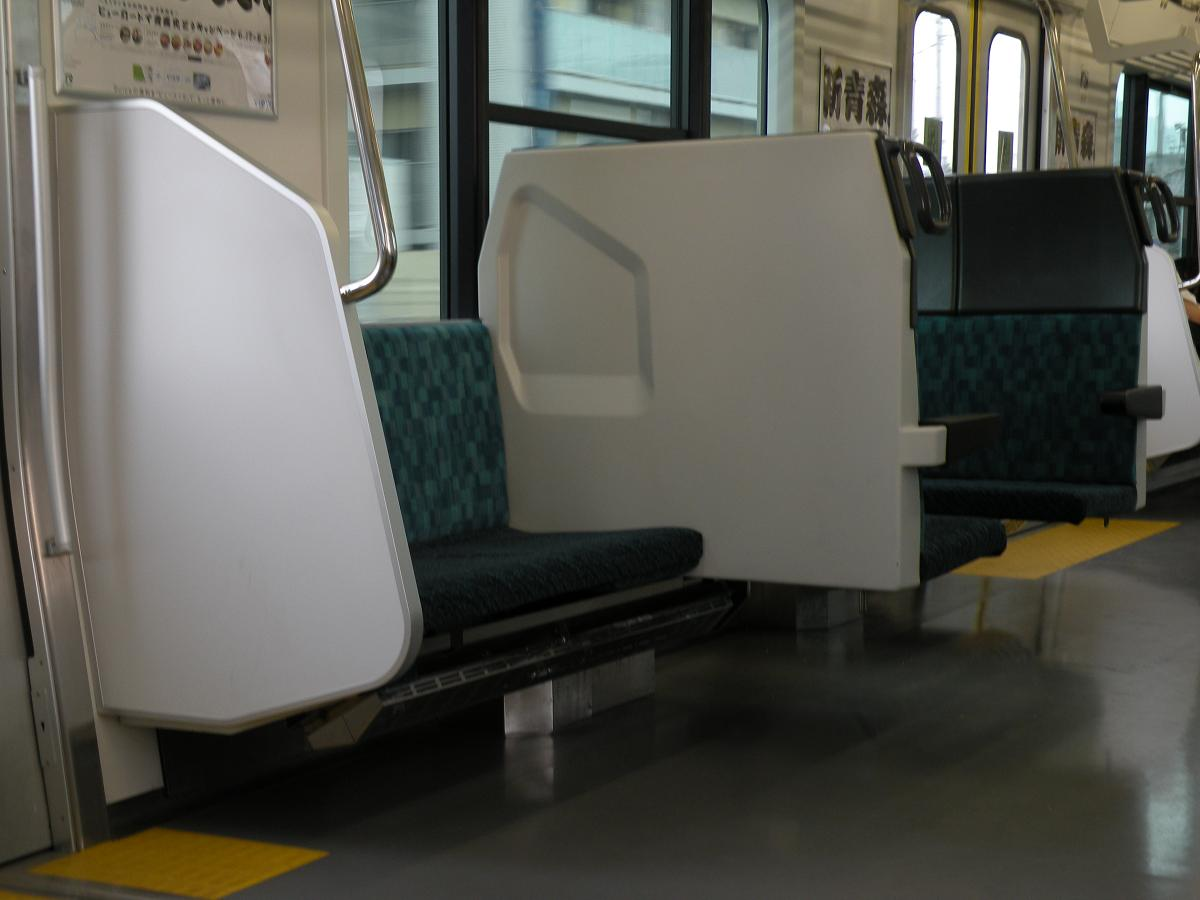
Transverse seating bay in car 1

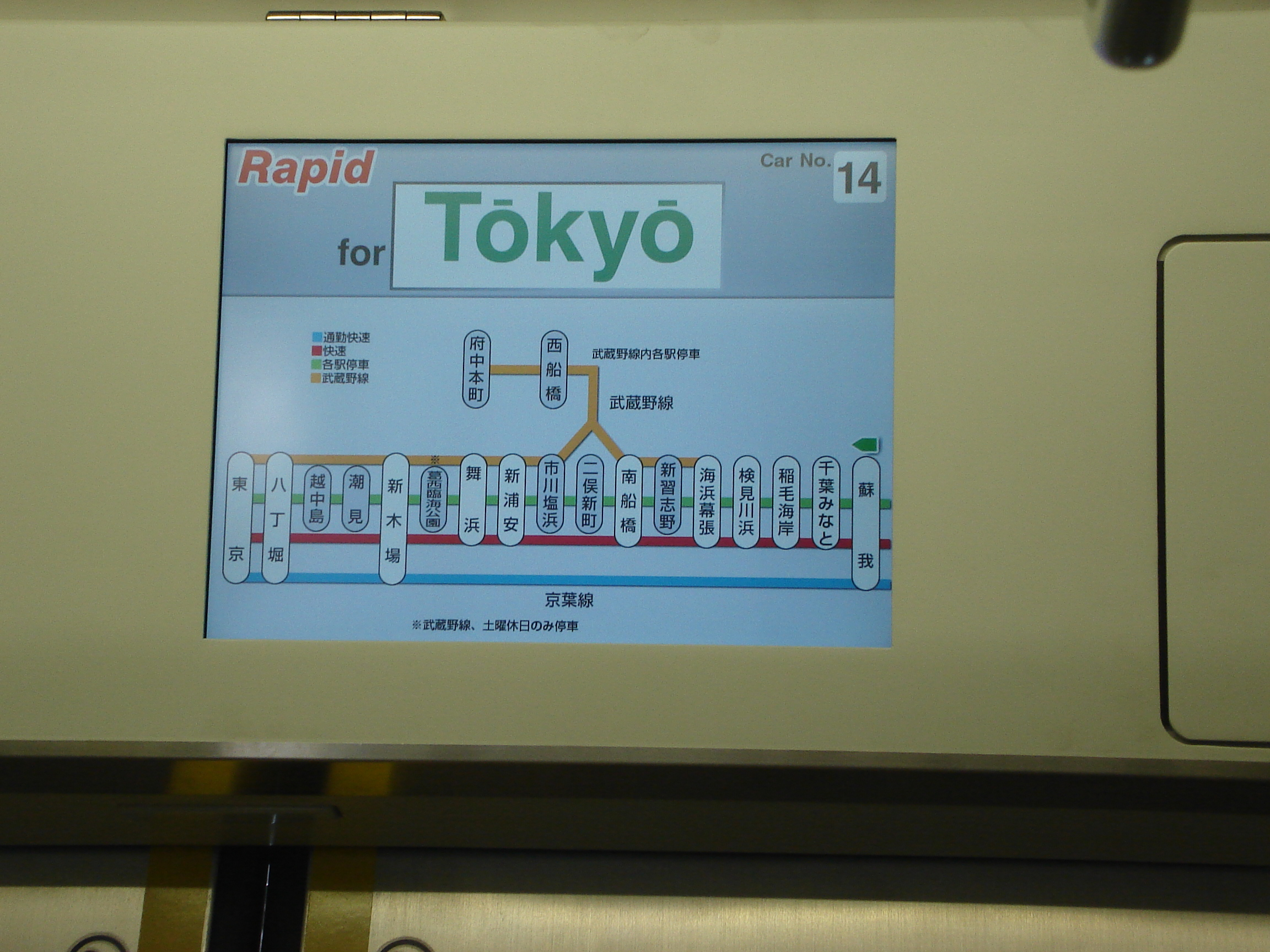
LCD passenger information display

== History ==
Incorporating new technology tested on the earlier experimental E993 series "AC Train", the E331 series was delivered to JR East in March 2006. Cars 1 to 7 were built by Tokyu Car Corporation in Yokohama, and cars 8 to 14 were built by Kawasaki Heavy Industries in Kobe.

Following extensive test running, the set entered revenue service on the Keiyo Line between Tokyo and Soga from the start of the revised timetable on 18 March 2007, used only on weekend services. From April, the set was taken out of service, and in October 2007, the seven Kawasaki-built cars were returned to their manufacturer for modifications, and in March 2008, the seven Tokyu Car cars were also returned to Tokyu Car for modifications. The set was returned to service on 23 December 2008.

The set was removed from revenue service in May 2009, returning to service on 3 April 2010. It was subsequently removed from service again, and remained stored out of service at Shin-Narashino Depot from early 2011 before finally being hauled to Nagano Works in March 2014 for scrapping.

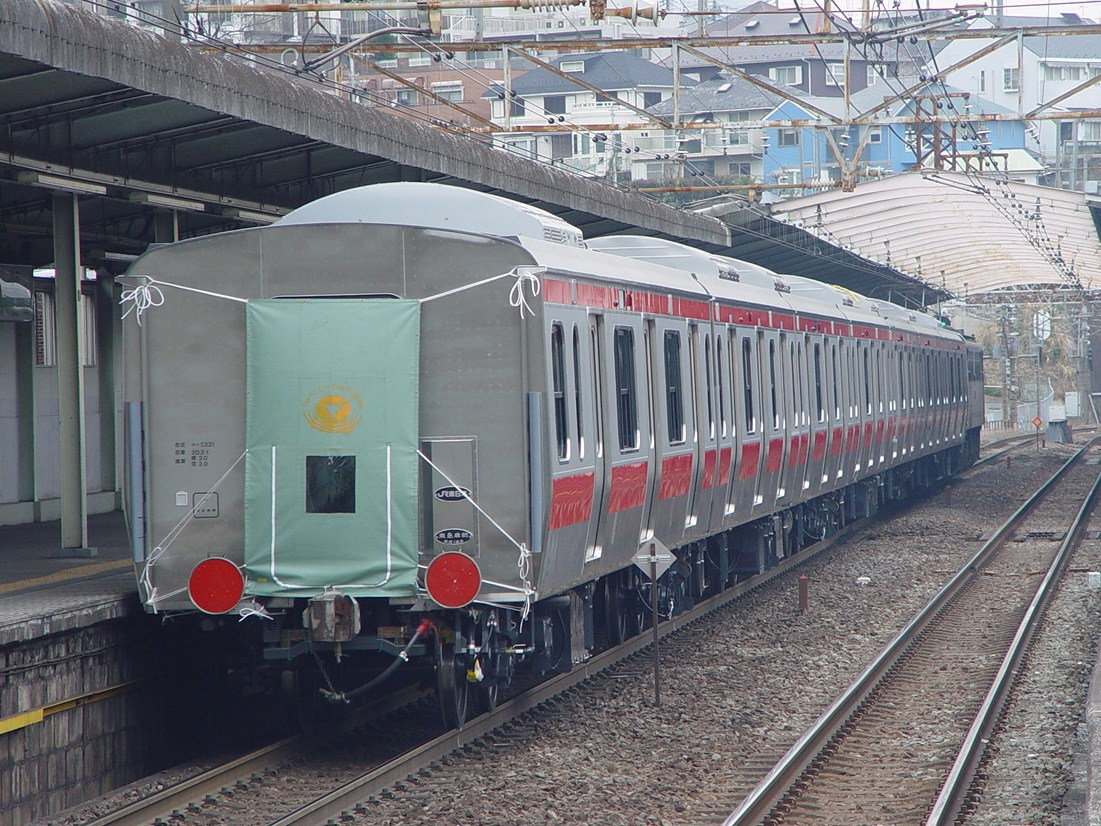
Cars 1 to 7 on delivery from Tokyu Car's Yokohama factory, March 2006

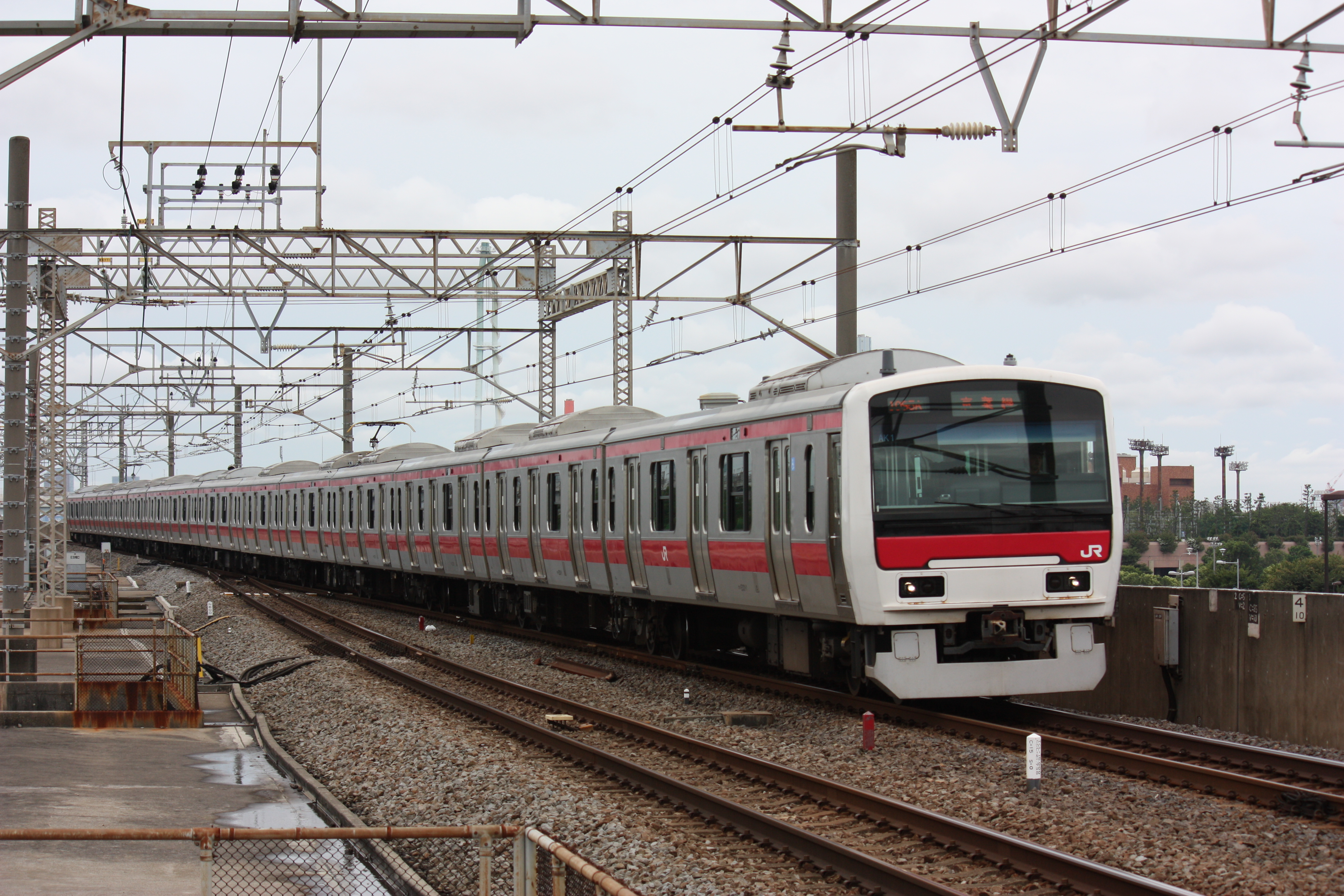
The E331 series set in service on the Keiyo Line, June 2010

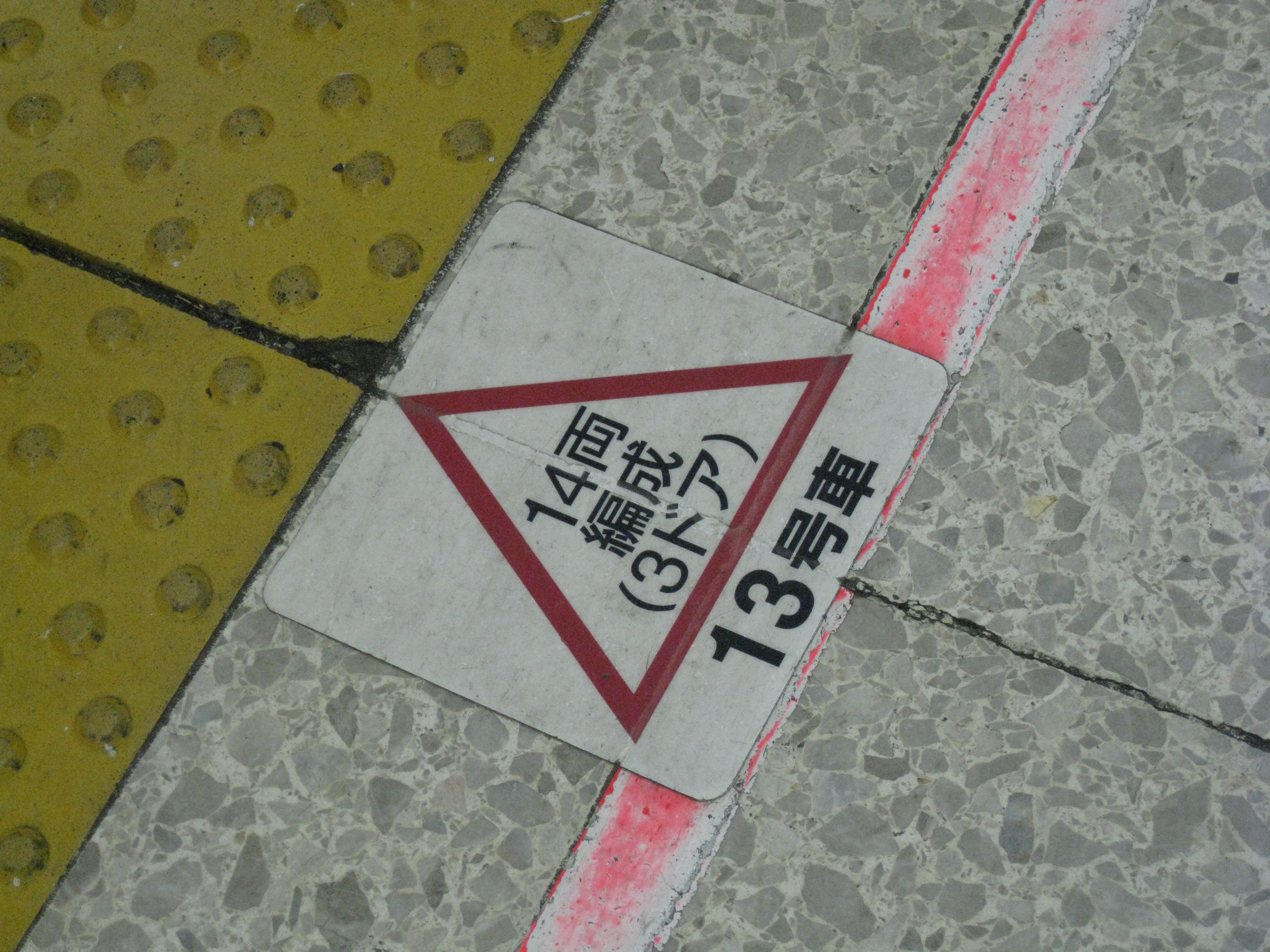
A sticker on the Keiyo Line platform at Tokyo Station marking the door position for E331 series trains, April 2008

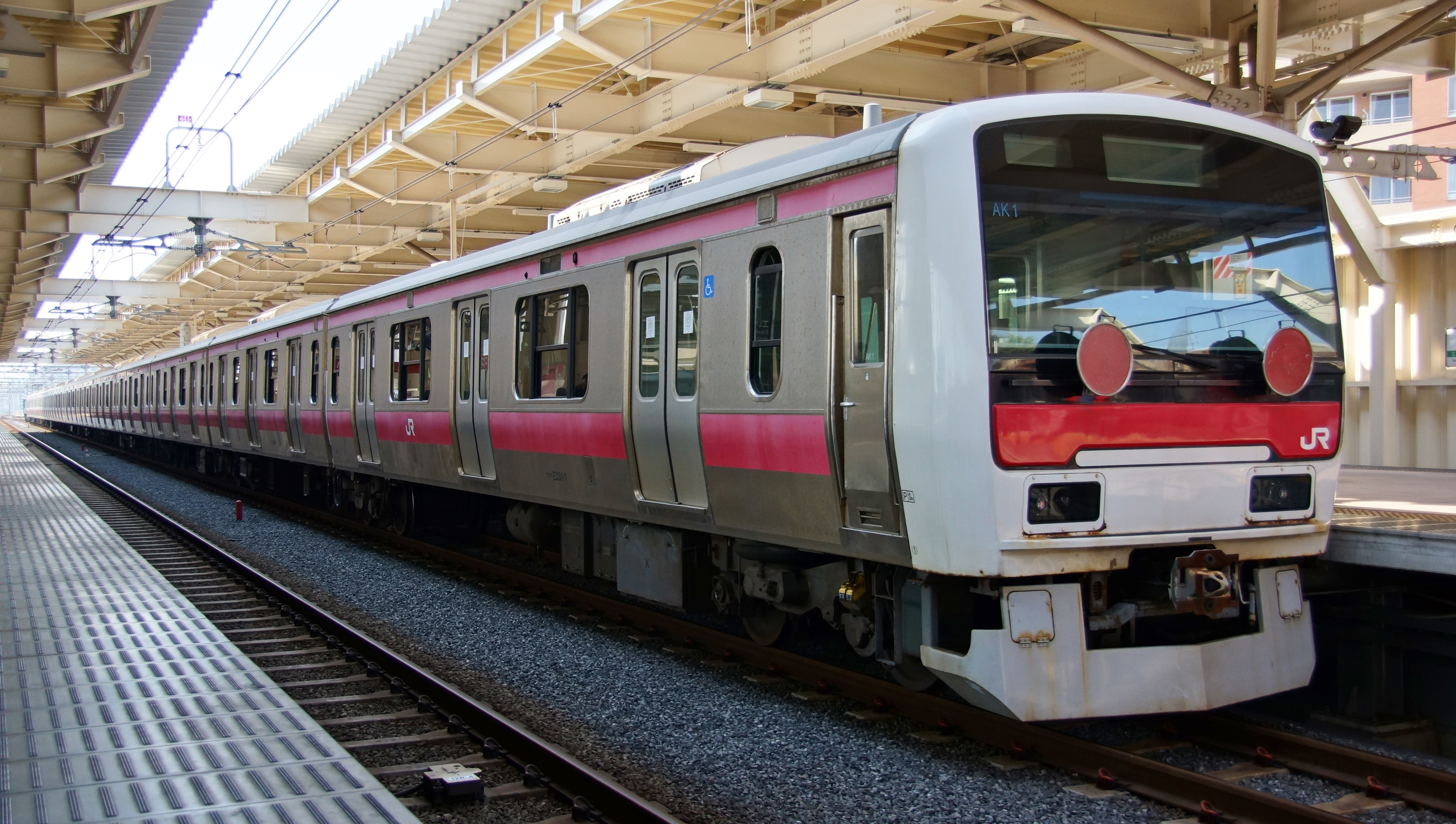
The E331 series set being hauled to JR East's Nagano Works in March 2014

== See also ==
- E231 series
- E233 series
