= Bundesautobahn 52 =

Federal motorway in Germany

A 52
- Bundesautobahn 52
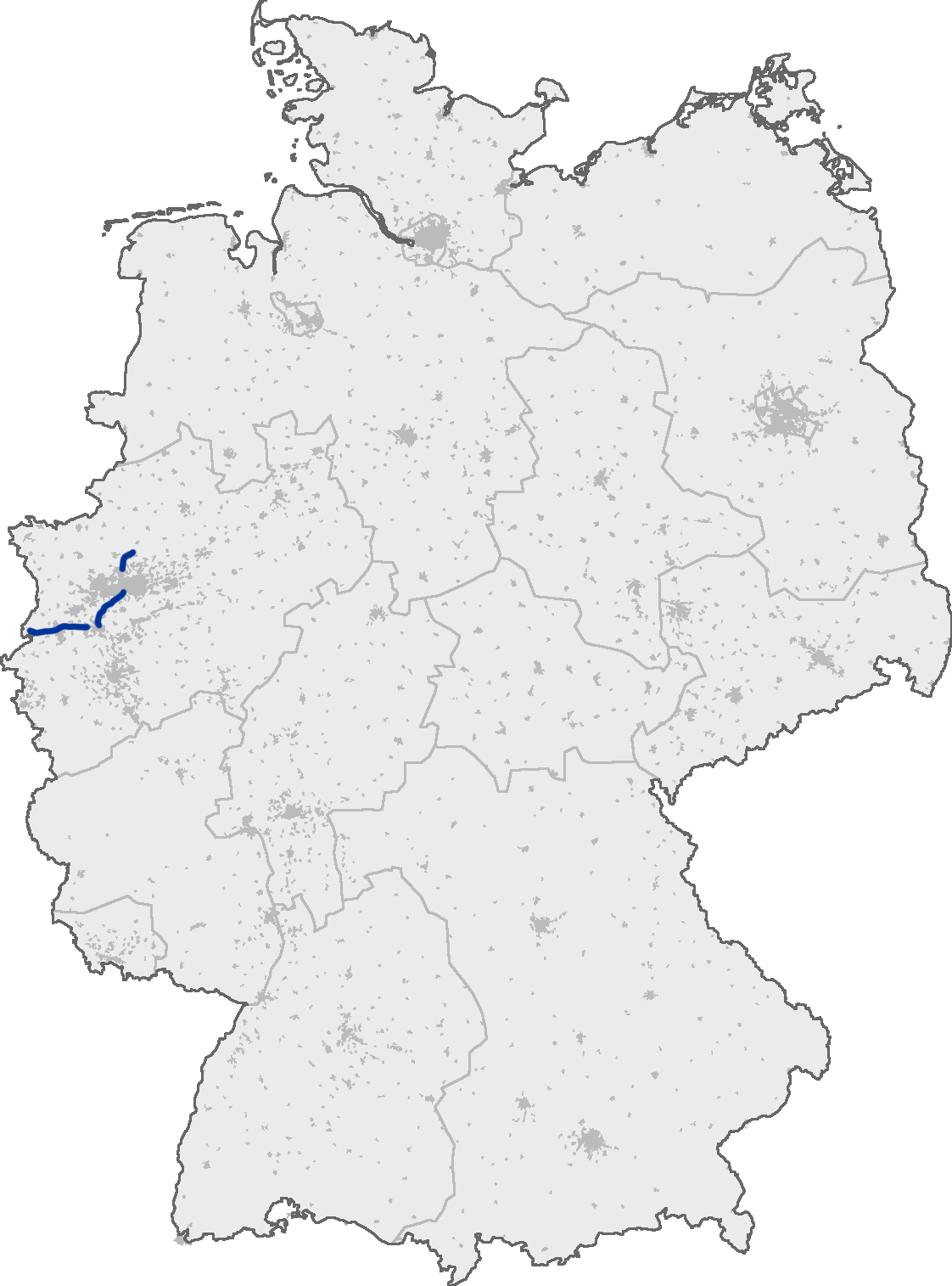

Route information
- Length: 92 km (57 mi)

Location
- Country: Germany
- States: North Rhine-Westphalia

Highway system
- Roads in Germany; Autobahns; List; Federal; List; State; E-roads
← A 49	→ A 57

Bundesautobahn 52 (translates from German as Federal Motorway 52, short form Autobahn 52, abbreviated as BAB 52 or A 52) is an autobahn in western Germany. It starts at the Dutch-German border near the community of Niederkrüchten, district of Viersen. From Niederkrüchten, it runs northeast.

Its westernmost part serves as an important commuter route into Düsseldorf. The autobahn becomes Bundesstraße 7 shortly before the Rheinkniebrücke, which leads into the Düsseldorf city centre. Traffic on the A 52 is routed through the Düsseldorf city centre on the B 8 and B 1 secondary roads up to Düsseldorf-Mörsenbroich, where the A 52 becomes a road of its own again.

The autobahn has three parts:

1. Dutch-German border – Niederkrüchten-Elmpt – Mönchengladbach – Düsseldorf-Heerdt
2. Düsseldorf-Mörsenbroich – Dreieck Essen-Ost
3. Gladbeck – Gelsenkirchen – Marl-Nord

A new connection from the Dutch border to Elmpt opened in May 2009. An extension connecting the interchange Essen-Ost with the interchange Gladbeck has been proposed for several years but has not been built yet due to the need for several kilometers of tunnels below densely populated areas.

== Exit list ==
	From interchange Roermond A 73 (NL)
N280	Netherlands
(1)	Niederkrüchten border crossing
	Grünbrücke 50 m
(2)	Elmpt
(3)	Niederkrüchten B 221
	Schwalmtal 254 m
(4)	Schwalmtal
	Straßenbrücke 60 m
	Kranenbachbrücke 60 m
(5)	Hostert
(6)	Mönchengladbach-Hardt
(7)	Mönchengladbach 4-way interchange A 61
	Rest area Wolfskull/Bockerter
(8)	Mönchengladbach-Nord
(9)	Mönchengladbach-Neuwerk
(10)	Neersen 4-way interchange A 44
	Services Kleinraststätt Cloerbruch
(11)	Willich-Schiefbahn
(12)	Kaarst-Nord
(13)	Kaarst 4-way interchange A 57 E31
(14)	Büderich
B 1 B 7 B 8
(21)	Düsseldorf-Rath
(22)	Düsseldorf-Nord 4-way interchange A 44
(23)	Ratingen
	Tiefenbroich parking area
	Straßenbrücke 50 m
(24)	Tiefenbroich
(25)	Breitscheid 3-way interchange A 524
(25a)	Breitscheid 4-way interchange A 3 E35
(25b)	Breitscheid B 227
	Auberg parking area
	Mintarder Ruhrtal 1830 m
	Ickten parking area
(26)	Essen-Kettwig
(27)	Essen-Haarzopf
(28)	Essen-Rüttenscheid B 224
(29)	Essen-Süd
(30)	Essen-Bergerhausen B 227
	Kreuz Essen-Bergerhausen (planned) A 44
	Tunnel Huttrop 340 m
(32)	Essen-Ost 4-way interchange A 40
	Tunnel Frillendorf 680 m (planned)
	Essen-Frillend-West (planned)
	Tunnel 700 m (planned)
	Essen-Stoppenberg (planned)
	Tunnel 870 m (planned)
B 224 interrupted (further need)
	Tankstelle Buer
(42)	Gelsenkirchen-Buer-West B 226
(43)	Gelsenkirchen-Scholven
	Straßenbrücke 220 m
(44)	Gelsenkirchen-Hassel B 224
(45)	Dorsten-Ost
(46)	Marl-Frentrop B 225
(47)	Marl-Brassert
(48)	Marl-Zentrum
	Bahn- und Straßenbrücke 50 m
(49)	Marl-Hamm
(50)	Marl-Nord 4-way interchange A 43
L612 Haltern
