= Vohwinkel, Wuppertal =

District of Wuppertal, Germany

Coordinates: 51°14′12″N 7°04′06″E

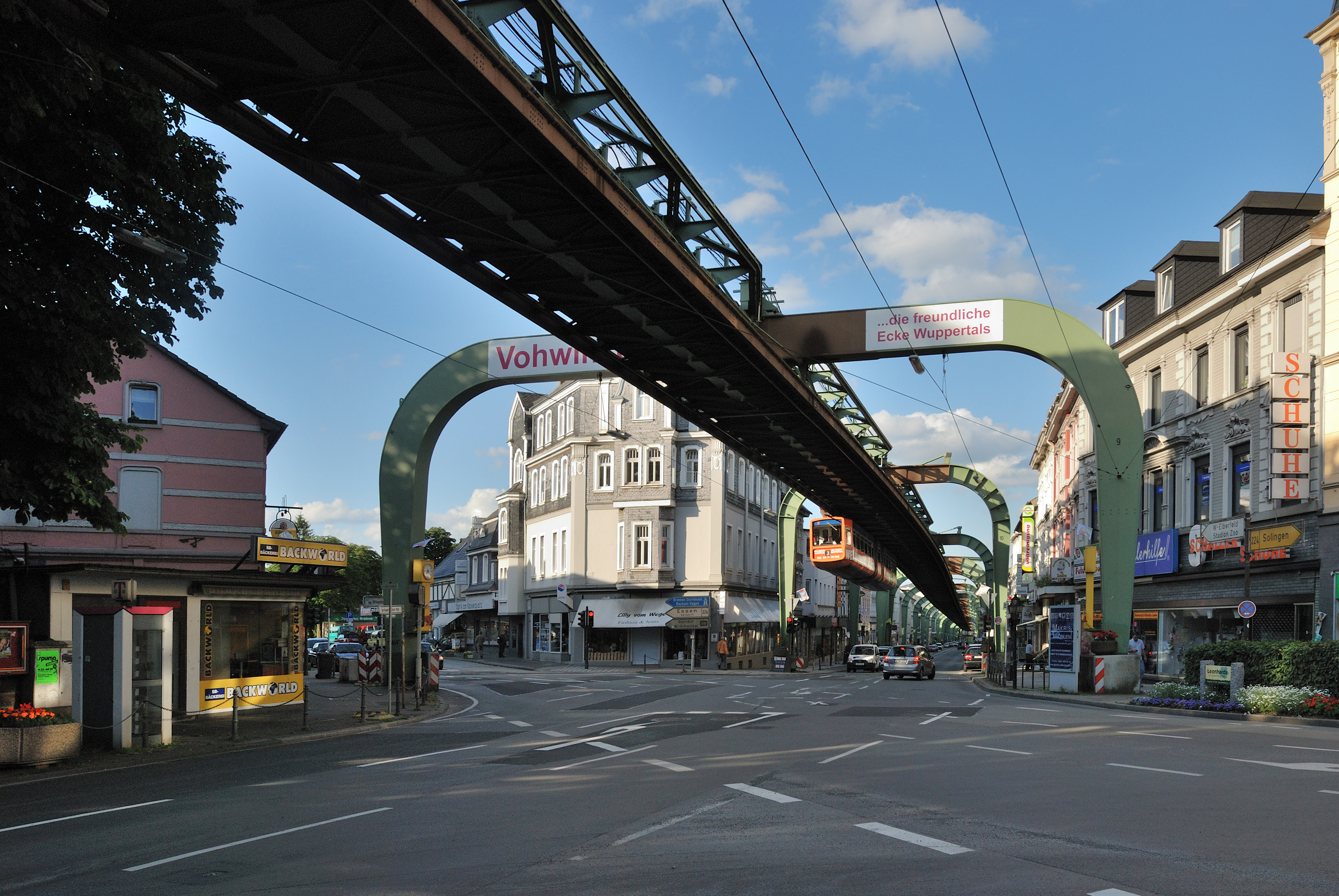
Kaiserplatz in Vohwinkel

Vohwinkel is the most western district (Stadtteil) of Wuppertal, Germany. It was a separate town that in 1929 joined with Elberfeld, Barmen, Cronenberg, and Ronsdorf to form Wuppertal. It has about 31,000 inhabitants.

== History ==
AS Vowynkele the place was first mentioned in a sales document in 1356. It maintained a rural character into the 19th century. With the construction of the railways, it became well-connected and eventually a transportation hub. The first line was the Düsseldorf–Elberfeld railway that opened in 1841. Later connections went to o Essen in 1847 and to Solingen in 1887. In 1888, Vohwinkel was separated from Sonnborn and many buildings were made during the Gründerzeit. In 1921, Vohwinkel received borough rights in the Rhine Province.

During the occupation of the Rhineland, 1923-25, French troops occupied Vohwinkel. During World War II, Vohwinkel was bombed on January 1, 1945, with a focus on the marshalling yards. American troops reached the town on April 16, 1945.

== Schwebebahn terminal ==
The western terminal of the Schwebebahn, which opened on May 24, 1901, is located in the center of Vohwinkel. It contains a loop for trains to turn around. Adjacent is the three-storied depot where trains are stored, maintained, and repaired. The Vohwinkel railway station is in walking distance.

== Flea market ==
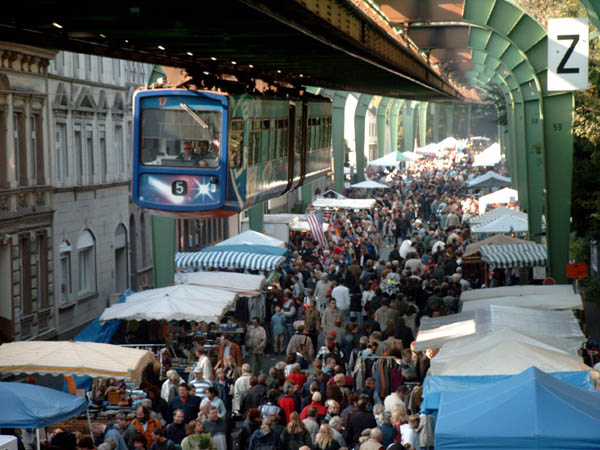
Vohwinkel Flea Market (2005)

Since 1971, on the last Sunday in September, the Vohwinkel Flea Market (Vohwinkler Flohmarkt) took place until the arrival of the Covid pandemic. Typically, about 300,000 to 400,000 visitors attended to look for bargains among the 500-600 exhibitors. In 1983, the flea market was noted in the Guinness Book of World Records as the largest one-day flea market in the world. After Covid, a smaller flea market is held on Saturdays.

== Notable people ==
- Eugen Huth (1901-1976), politician
- Friedrich Dickel (1913-1993), East German politician
