= Westfield Centro =

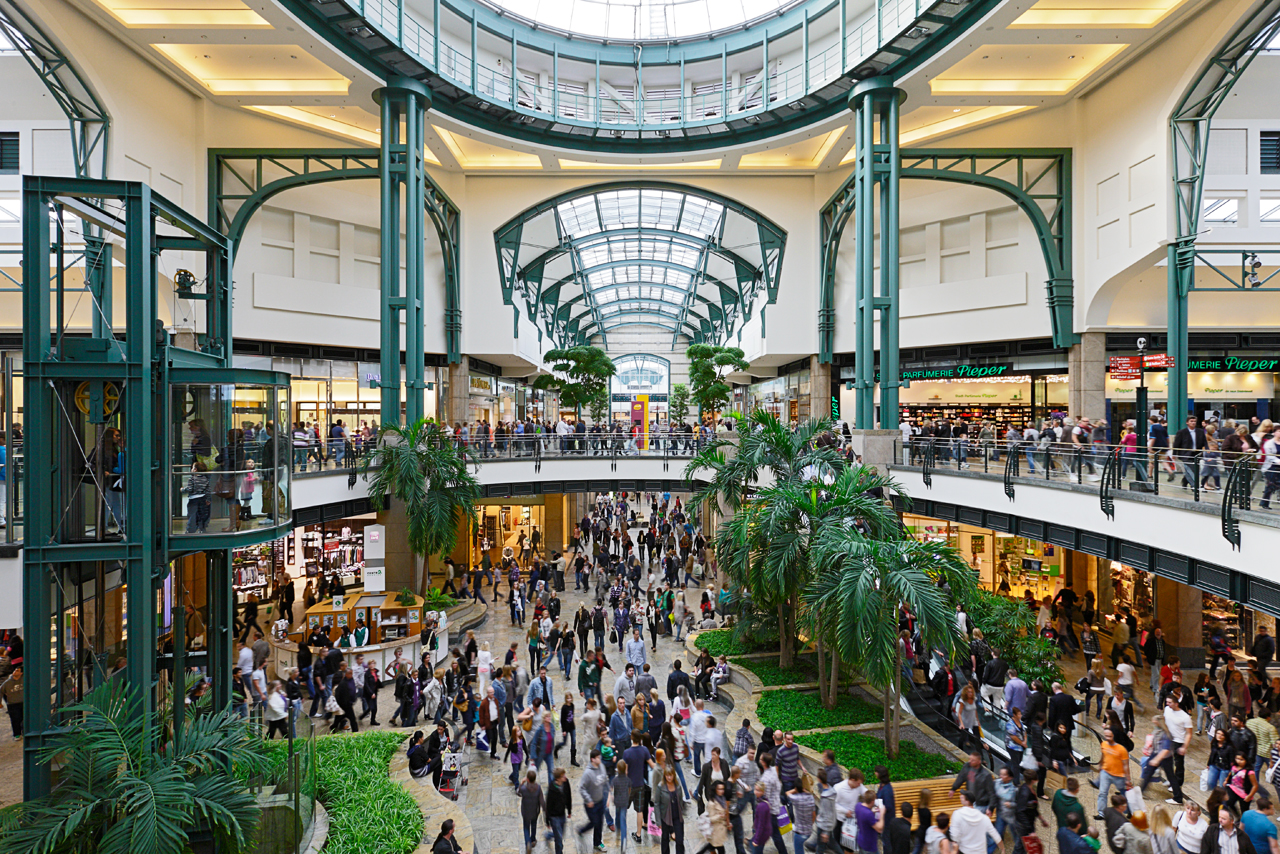
- Interior view of CentrO
- Location: Oberhausen, Germany
- Coordinates: 51°29′30″N 6°52′36″E
- Address: Neue Mitte Oberhausen
- Opened: 12 September 1996
- Owner: CentrO Management GmbH / Unibail-Rodamco / Canada Pension Plan Investment Board
- Architect: Rhode, Kellermann, Wawrowsky
- Num. of stores: 250+
- Floor area: 125,000 m^{2} (1,350,000 sq ft)
- Website: www.westfield.com/germany/centro

former Logo from 1996-2017

Westfield CENTRO (formally known as CentrO until August 31st, 2021) is a shopping mall in Oberhausen, North Rhine-Westphalia, Germany. It forms part of a large commercial development called the Neue Mitte ("new center").

Westfield CENTRO is Germany's largest shopping mall. The development was rather controversial, with neighbouring municipalities opposing the size and scope of the project, fearing a loss of sales to businesses in their city centers.

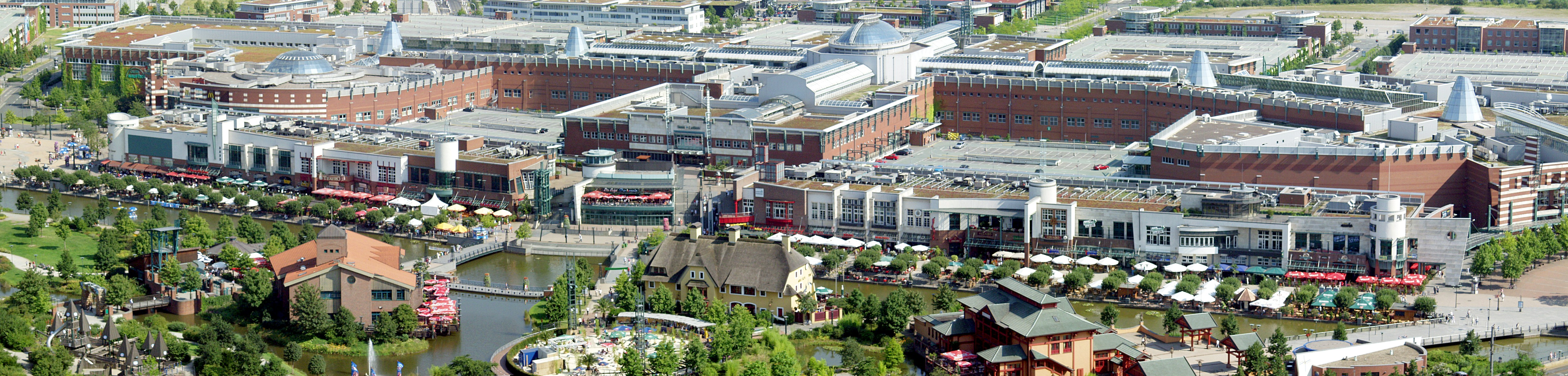
Mall and promenade of CentrO, Oberhausen
