= Helsa =

- Municipality
- Coat of arms

- Location of Helsa within Kassel district
- Interactive map of Helsa
- Location within Germany Location within Hesse
- Coordinates: 51°16′N 09°41′E
- Country: Germany
- State: Hesse
- Admin. region: Kassel
- District: Kassel

Government
  - Mayor (2020–26): Andreas Schönemann (SPD)

Area
  - Total: 25.77 km^{2} (9.95 sq mi)
- Elevation: 427 m (1,401 ft)

Population (2025-12-31)
  - Total: 5,341
  - Density: 207.3/km^{2} (536.8/sq mi)
- Time zone: UTC+01:00 (CET)
  - Summer (DST): UTC+02:00 (CEST)
- Postal codes: 34298
- Dialling codes: 05605 (Helsa), 05602 (Eschenstruth, St. Ottilien), 05604 (Wickenrode)
- Vehicle registration: KS
- Website: www.gemeinde-helsa.de

Helsa is a municipality and village in the district of Kassel, in Hesse, Germany. The municipality is situated in the Losse valley amongst the hills of the Kaufunger Wald, approx. 15 km east of Kassel.

== Division of the municipality ==
The municipality consists of the villages, Eschenstruth (including Settlement Waldhof), Helsa, St. Ottilien and Wickenrode.
