= European route E331 =

Road in trans-European E-road network

E331

Major junctions
- From: Dortmund
- To: Kassel

Location
- Countries: Germany

Highway system
- International E-road network; A Class; B Class

E331 is a European B class road in Germany, connecting the cities Dortmund – Kassel

- Germany
  - Dortmund, Kassel
