= Gottfried Schultz =

- Type: GmbH & Co. KG
- Founded: 1924
- Headquarters: Ratingen, Germany
- Key people: Nicholas J. Dunning; Heinrich Weiss
- Revenue: 1.249 billion euros (2012)
- Number of employees: 3,000
- Website: www.gottfried-schultz.de

Gottfried Schultz GmbH is the largest dealer for the automotive brands owned by Volkswagen Group. The company is based in Ratingen and employs approximately 3,000 people in 33 plants. It distributes and services cars from the following brands: Volkswagen, Volkswagen Commercial Vehicles, Audi, SEAT, Škoda, Bentley, Porsche and Bugatti.

== History ==
In 1924, Gottfried Schultz (1903-1980) founded a company in Essen dealing in imported and used cars. Over the next several years, the company began to carry additional brands, becoming a dealer for Horch in the 1930s. In 1932, following the merger of Horch with Audi, Wanderer, and DKW to form the Auto Union, Gottfried Schultz began dealing in those brands. In 1939, as Volkswagen was searching for partners to services its vehicles, Gottfried Schultz signed a "main workshops treaty" with the company.

After the end of World War II, Gottfried Schultz was faced with the problem that many major manufacturing partners were within the Soviet occupation zone. In 1946, Schultz secured a contract to supply Volkswagen Beetles to the general public. In 1949, Gottfried Schultz established a branch in Düsseldorf. In 1952, the company founded sales offices in Opladen and Moers, followed by a branch office in Mettmann in 1958. In 1968, Gottfried Schultz opened a wholesale distribution center in Ratingen-Lintorf.

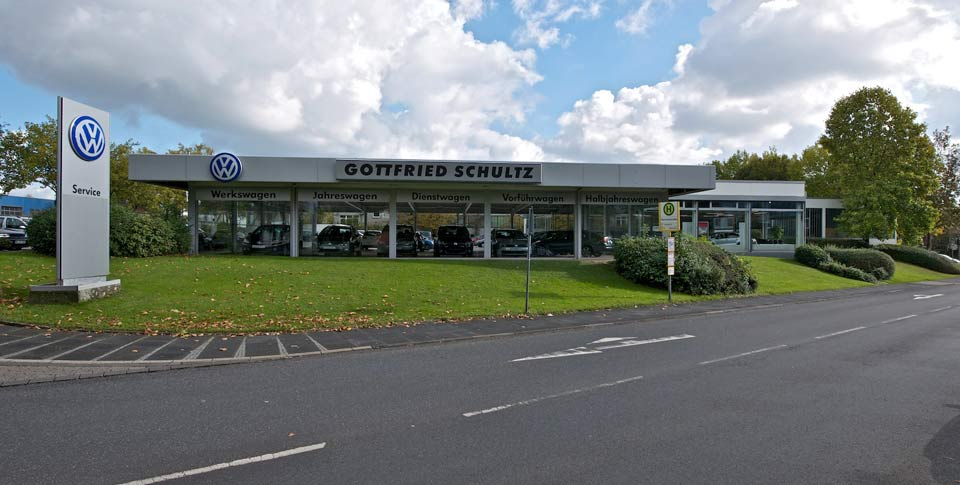
Gottfried Schultz dealership

In 1980, company founder Gottfried Schultz died at the age of 77 years.

Gottfried Schultz opened the first Audi Centre in Essen in 1989. This dealership group later expanded through new locations, acquisitions, and the development of specialized dealerships for brands within the Volkswagen Group. Since 2004, the company has operated at the Auto Höherweg automobile complex in Düsseldorf, hosting more than 20 automotive brands on a 15-hectare site. At this location, the group operates dealerships for Volkswagen, Škoda Auto, and Bentley Motors.

Gottfried Schultz is currently training more than 400 young people to automobile merchants, automotive mechatronics (automotive mechanics and auto electricians), coachbuilders, painters and specialists for warehouse logistics.

As of 2026, Gottfried Schultz's Board of Directors consists of Nicholas J. Dunning (chairman), Harald Fähr, Klaus Hungerland, and Jan Laubrunn. Hans-Georg Frey serves as the chairman of the Supervisory Board.
