= Ratingen =

- Town
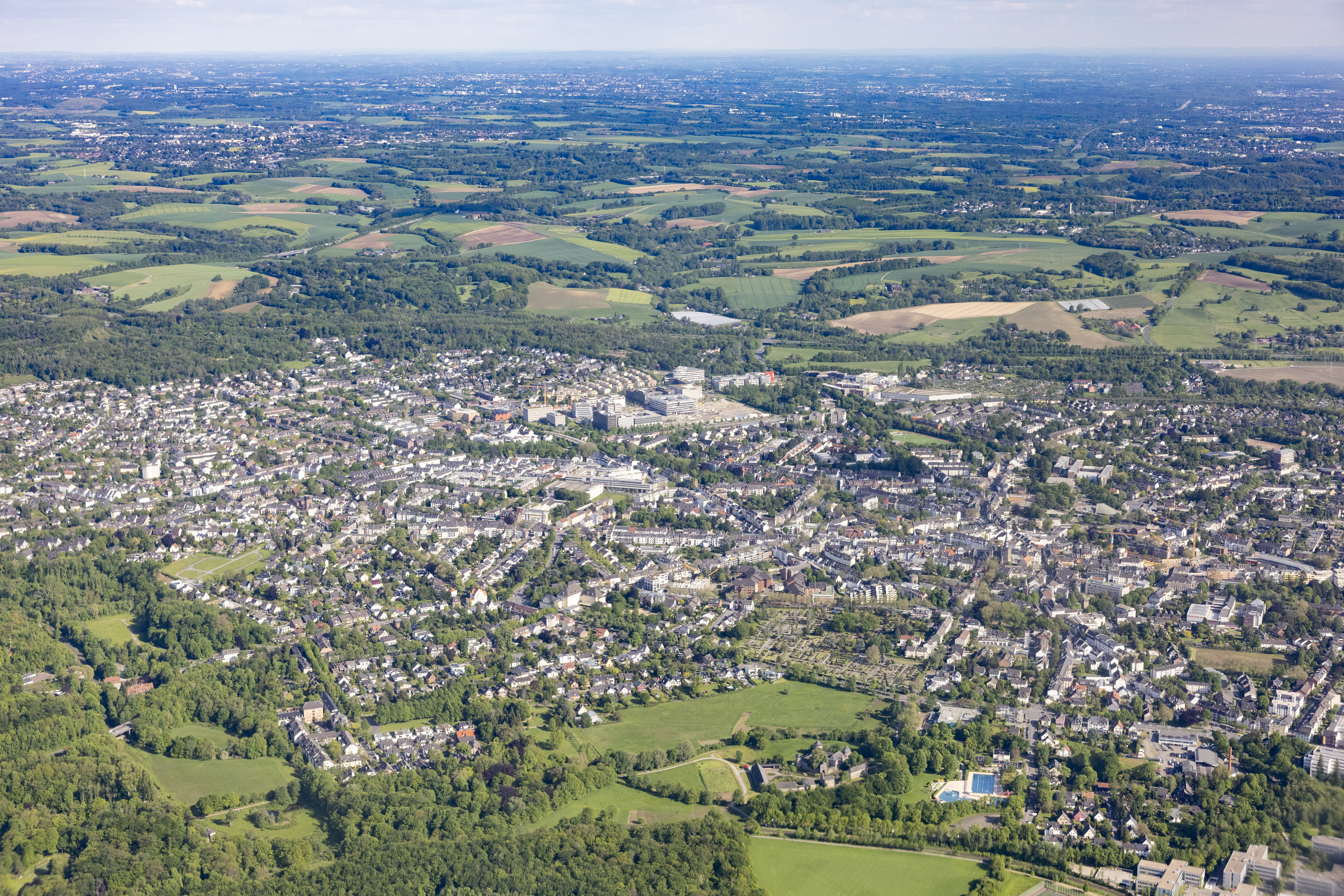
- Ratingen

- Flag Coat of arms

- Location of Ratingen within Mettmann district
- Interactive map of Ratingen
- Location within Germany Location within North Rhine-Westphalia
- Coordinates: 51°18′N 6°51′E
- Country: Germany
- State: North Rhine-Westphalia
- Admin. region: Düsseldorf
- District: Mettmann
- Subdivisions: 6 boroughs with 10 districts

Government
  - Mayor (2025–30): Patrick Anders (CDU)

Area
  - Total: 88.74 km^{2} (34.26 sq mi)
- Elevation: 50 m (160 ft)

Population (2025-12-31)
  - Total: 88,914
  - Density: 1,002/km^{2} (2,595/sq mi)
- Time zone: UTC+01:00 (CET)
  - Summer (DST): UTC+02:00 (CEST)
- Postal codes: 40878–40885 (1962–1995: 4030)
- Dialling codes: 02102
- Vehicle registration: ME, seit 1975 (1956–1974: D)
- Website: www.ratingen.de

Ratingen (German pronunciation: [ˈʁaːtɪŋən]; Limburgish: Rotinge) is a town in the district of Mettmann in North Rhine-Westphalia, Germany. It lies in the northwestern part of Berg about 12 km northeast of Düsseldorf.

== Administration ==
With a communal reform of 1975 the independent municipalities of Breitscheid, Eggerscheidt, Hösel, Lintorf (seat Angerland) as well as the local part of Homberg and the municipality of Homberg-Meiersberg (seat Hubbelrath) were added to the city of Ratingen.

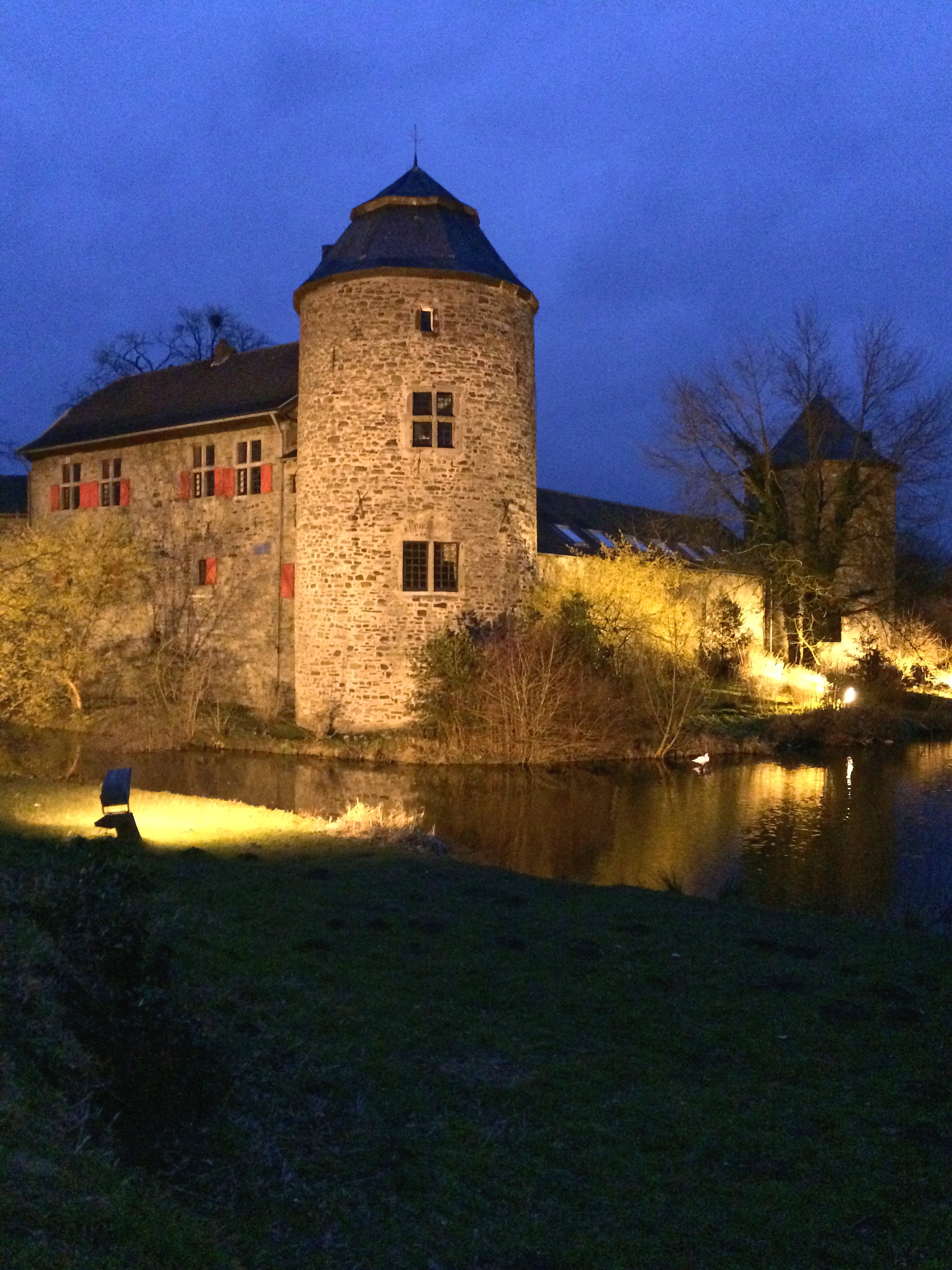
Water castle "Haus zum Haus"

== History ==
Ratingen was settled before 849. From the Middle Ages the Ratingen area belonged to the count and later dukes of Berg. On December 11, 1276 the settlement received city rights. Ratingen was one of the four places of Berg which experienced an economic boom in the end of the Middle Ages, but slowed during the Thirty Years' War. At the beginning of the Industrial Age, the first manufacturing plants opened in 1783. In Cromford the first mechanical spinnery of Europe opened, which grew into the Textilfabrik Cromford, now part of the Rheinisches Industriemuseum (Rhine Industry Museum). In the Napoleonic times, it became part of the city of Berg and in 1815, into the Kingdom of Prussia.

In the communal re-organization of 1929, Ratingen maintained its independence. After the defeat of German forces in the Second World War, Field Marshal Walter Model committed suicide in the forest adjacent to the city. After relatively small war damage, Ratingen in the 1960s and the 1970s experienced years of growth and development (West Ratingen with 20,000 inhabitants, developed in the late 1960s-1980s). In 1970, before further incorporations the number of inhabitants surpassed 50,000.

=== Population ===
Historical population

Year	Pop.	±% p.a.
1965	59,463	—
1970	68,810	+2.96%
1975	86,029	+4.57%
1980	89,463	+0.79%
1985	88,719	−0.17%
1990	91,007	+0.51%
1995	89,534	−0.33%

Year	Pop.	±% p.a.
2000	91,437	+0.42%
2005	91,975	+0.12%
2010	91,088	−0.19%
2015	87,943	−0.70%
2020	86,899	−0.24%
2025	88,914	+0.46%

Source: Landesdatabank Nordrhein-Westfalen

== Politics ==
The current mayor of Ratingen is Klaus Konrad Pesch of the Christian Democratic Union (CDU) since 2014. The most recent mayoral election was held on 13 September 2020, with a runoff held on 27 September, and the results were as follows:

Candidate	Party	First round		Second round	
Candidate	Party	Votes	%	Votes	%
Klaus Konrad Pesch	Christian Democratic Union	16,433	41.5	12,874	52.1
Rainer Vogt	Citizens' Union Ratingen	7,490	18.9	11,833	47.9
Christian Wiglow	Social Democratic Party	6,178	15.6		
Heinz Martin Tönnes	Alliance 90/The Greens	5,434	13.7		
Markus Sondermann	Free Democratic Party	2,344	5.9		
Hans Michael Gericke	Die PARTEI	1,029	2.6		
Manfred Evers	Independent	700	1.8		
Valid votes		39,608	98.9	24,707	99.4
Invalid votes		432	1.1	162	0.7
Total		40,040	100.0	24,869	100.0
Electorate/voter turnout		72,748	55.0	72,741	34.2
Source: City of Ratingen (1st round, 2nd round)

=== City council ===
Results of the 2020 city council election

The Ratingen city council governs the city alongside the Mayor. The most recent city council election was held on 13 September 2020, and the results were as follows:

Party	Votes	%	+/-	Seats	+/-
Christian Democratic Union (CDU)	13,595	34.4	▼0.2	24	▲4
Alliance 90/The Greens (Grüne)	7,553	19.1	▲9.5	14	▲9
Citizens' Union Ratingen (BU)	6,964	17.6	▼6.7	12	▼2
Social Democratic Party (SPD)	6,056	15.3	▼5.6	11	▼1
Free Democratic Party (FDP)	2,479	6.3	▲1.7	4	▲1
Alternative for Germany (AfD)	1,607	4.1	▲1.0	3	▲1
Die PARTEI	1,159	2.9	New	2	New
The Optimists	119	0.3	New	0	New
Independent Manfred Evers	40	0.1	New	0	New
Valid votes	39,572	98.9			
Invalid votes	458	1.1			
Total	40,030	100.0		70	▲12
Electorate/voter turnout	72,748	55.0	▲3.4		
Source: City of Ratingen

== Economy ==
Several important international enterprises (particularly from the IT industry) as Vodafone, ASUS, Hewlett-Packard, SAP, CEMEX and Esprit maintain branches and/or main centres in Ratingen. It is also the hometown of automotive dealer Gottfried Schultz. On 1 June 2021 Trading Hub Europe, the market area manager for the German natural gas market, was founded in Ratingen.

== Sport ==
Since 1997 the town has hosted the Mehrkampf-Meeting, an annual decathlon and pentathlon meeting.

== Twin towns – sister cities ==
Ratingen is twinned with:

- Maubeuge, France (1958)
- Le Quesnoy, France (1963)
- Vermillion, United States (1969)
- Kokkola, Finland (1989)
- Beelitz, Germany (1990)
- Gagarin, Russia (1998)
- Huishan (Wuxi), China (2007)

Between 1972 and 2016 Ratingen was also twinned to Cramlington/Blyth Valley, United Kingdom.

== Notable people ==
- Martin J. Beckmann (1924–2017), economist
- Heribert Fassbender (born 1941), sports presenter
- Claudia Jung (born 1964), singer
- Johann Peter Melchior (1747–1825), sculptor and porcelain designer
- Marius Müller-Westernhagen (born 1948), rock musician and actor
- Rosemarie Nitribitt (1933–1957), luxury call girl
- Dieter Nuhr (born 1960), comedian, author and cabaret artist
- Norbert Pohlmann (born 1960), computer scientist
- Sönke Wortmann (born 1959), film director
