= Heribert Faßbender =

German sports journalist

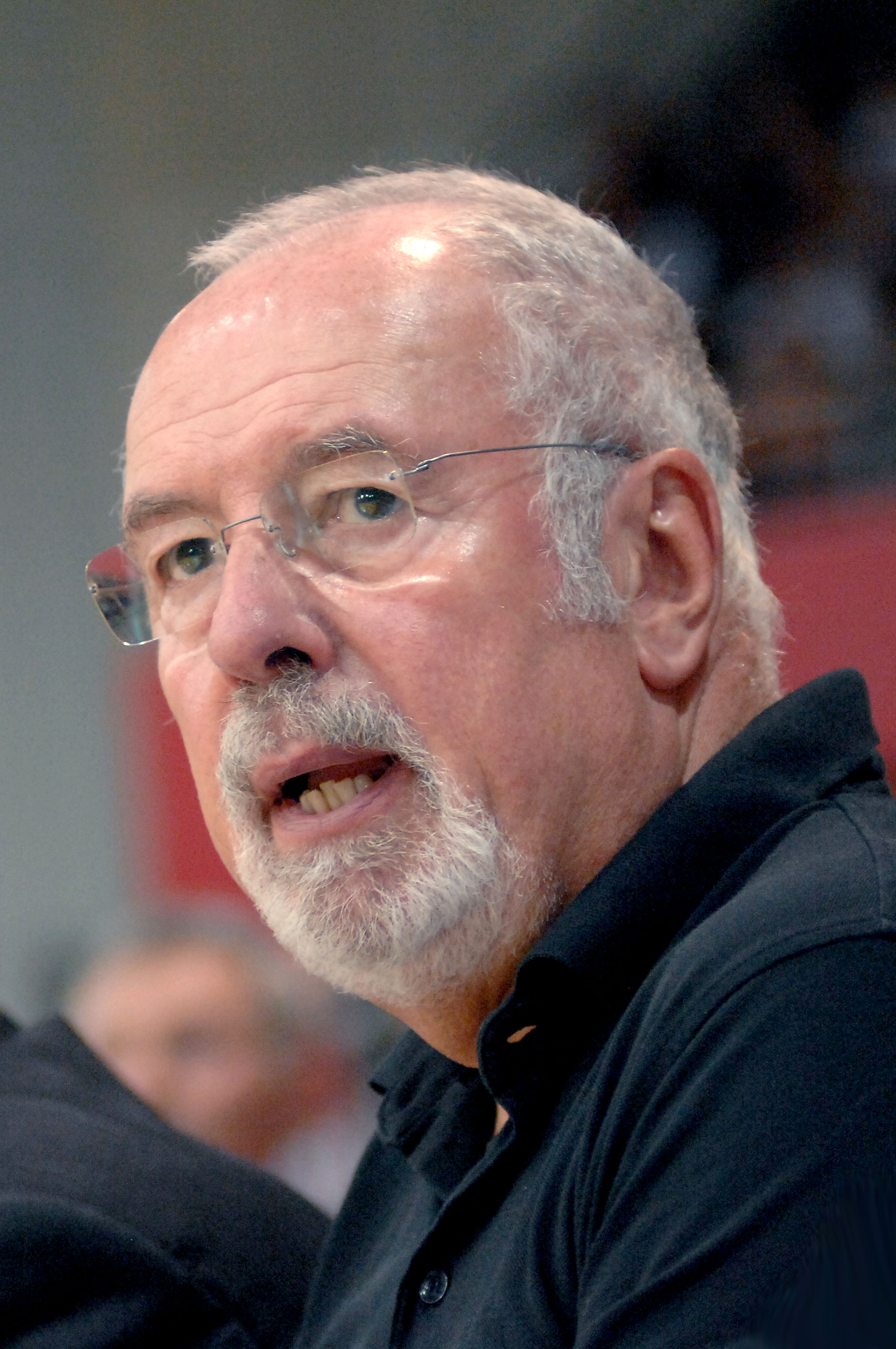
Faßbender in 2009

Heribert Faßbender (born 30 May 1941) is a German sports journalist.

== Life ==
Faßbender was born in Ratingen. He worked since 1963 for German broadcaster Westdeutscher Rundfunk (WDR) and later for sport magazine Sportschau on German broadcaster ARD. He is married and lives in Leverkusen.

== Works ==
- (in German)
- "Die deutsche WM-Geschichte", Delius Klasing Bielefeld, 2006.
- "Das Sporttagebuch des 20. Jahrhunderts", ECON Düsseldorf, 1984.
- "Olympische Spiele 1992", Falken Niedernhausen, 1992.
- "Fußballjahrbücher 1990/91/92/93/94/95", Falken Niedernhausen.

== Awards ==
- 2001: Order of Merit of North Rhine-Westphalia
