= Hoffmann (motorcycle) =

Hoffmann-Werke Lintorf
- Industry: motorcycles bicycles
- Predecessor: Solinger Fahrrad Fabrik
- Founder: Jakob Oswald Hoffmann
- Fate: Bankruptcy
- Headquarters: Lintorf, West Germany
- Products: Vespa (under licence); Hoffmann Gouveneur
- Number of employees: 950 (1954)

Hoffmann was a bicycle manufacturer in Ratingen-Lintorf, Germany. Between 1948 and 1954 the company also manufactured motorcycles. It made a range of models using engines from 125cc to 250cc made by ILO, and the Gouverneur, which had a transversely-mounted 248 cc flat twin four-stroke engine designed by Richard Küchen, and shaft drive. The Gouverneur was developed into the MP 250-2 and finally, in 1953, the S 300 model.

From 1949 to 1954 Hoffmann also made at least 60,000 Vespa motor scooters under license. A licensing dispute brought this to an end in 1954. At the same time, Hoffmann also withdrew from making its own motorcycles, and had further legal problems with their microcar, the Auto-Kabine.

== Beginning ==
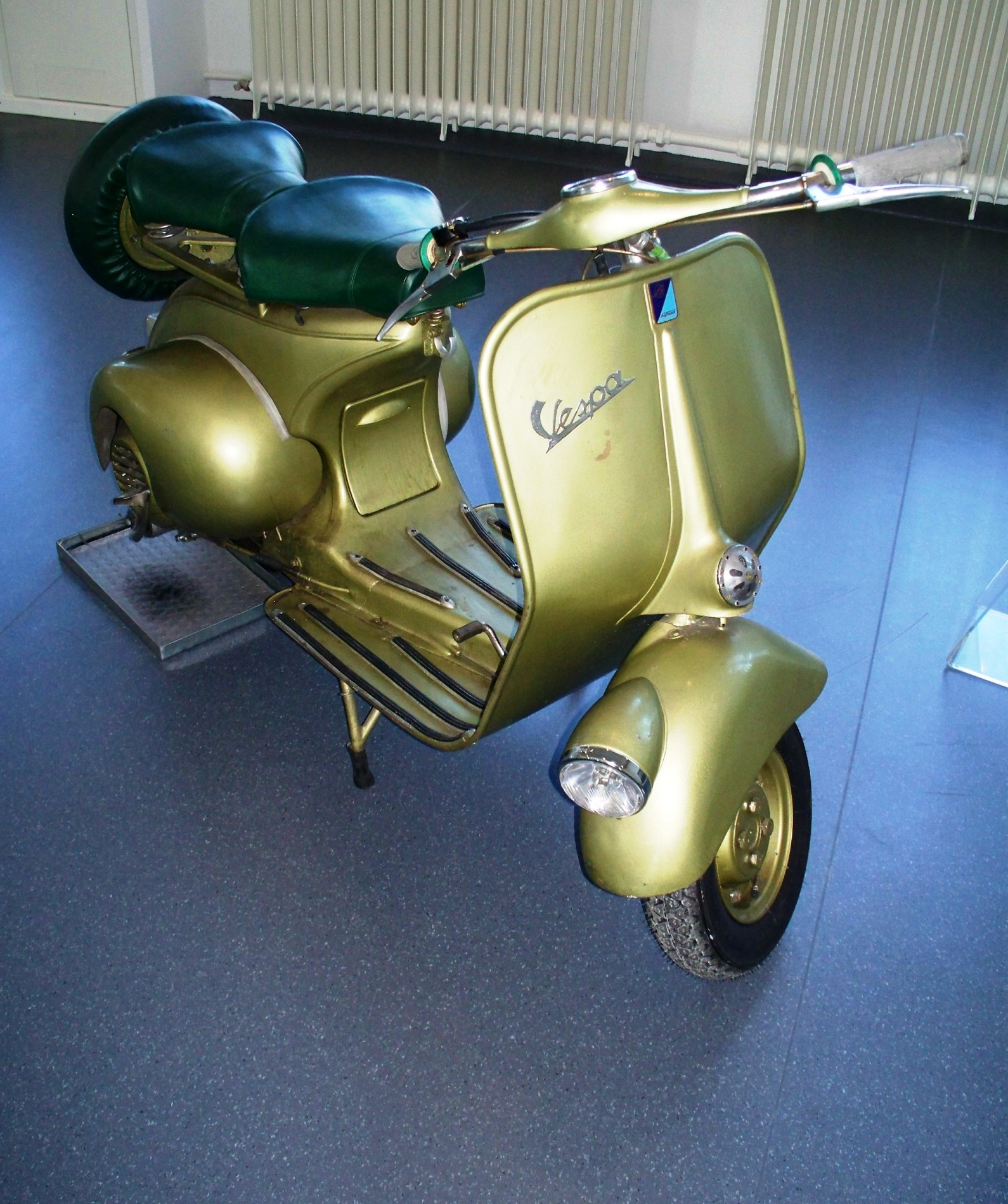
Hoffmann Vespa 125

Jakob Oswald Hoffmann moved his Solinger Bicycle Factory to Lintorf, near Düsseldorf, shortly after the end of World War II. In the immediate postwar era, the factory made household goods, tools, and bicycles. The factory began making motorcycles in 1948.

== Vespa production ==
On 9 August 1949, Hoffmann's factory was granted the first license to manufacture Piaggio's Vespa scooter. One month later, on 9 September 1949, the factory changed its name to Hoffmann-Werke. Hoffmann made thousands of Vespas each year from 1949 to 1953, ultimately making at least 60,000 Vespas by the end of production.

== Gouverneur motorcycle ==
Hoffmann Gouverneur
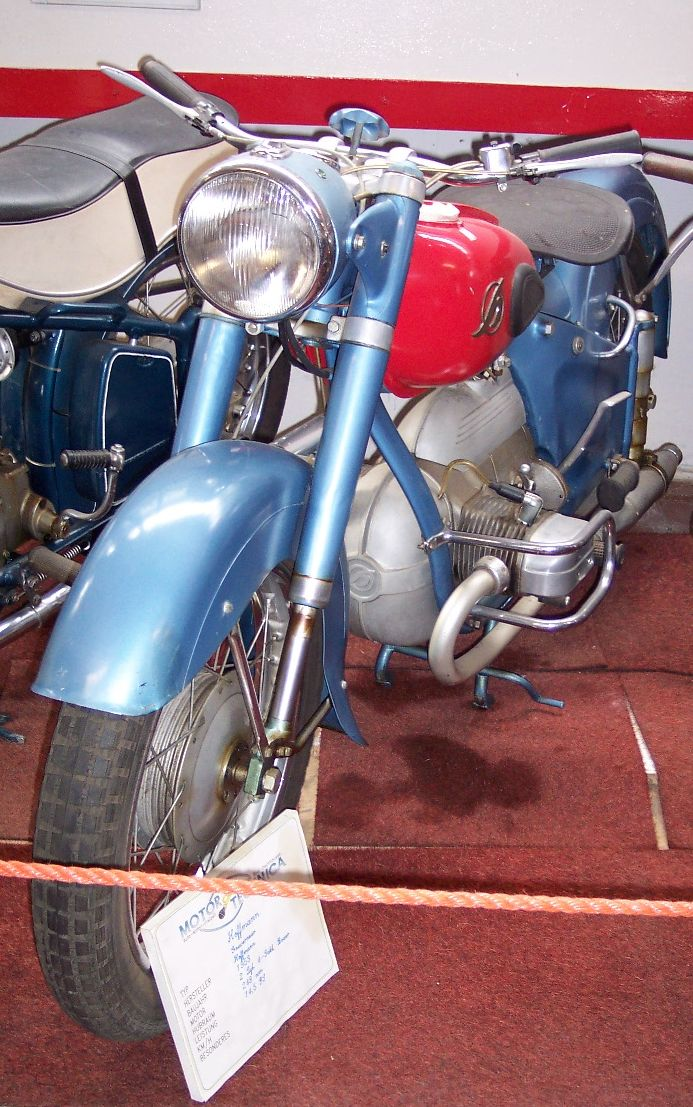
- 1953 Hoffmann S 300 Gouverneur
- Manufacturer: Hoffmann-Werke
- Also called: MP-250; S 300
- Production: MP-250: 1951–1954; S 300: 1953–1954
- Assembly: Lintorf
- Class: standard
- Engine: OHV flat-twin engine MP-250: 248 cc S 300: 298 cc
- Bore / stroke: MP-250: 58 mm × 47 mm (2.3 in × 1.9 in); S 300: 61 mm × 51 mm (2.4 in × 2.0 in)
- Power: MP-250 (1951-2): 11 hp (8.2 kW) at 4500 rpm MP-250 (1953-4): 14.5 hp (10.8 kW) at 4800 rpm S 300: 17 PS (13 kW)
- Transmission: four speed foot shift
- Frame type: Pressed steel spine frame with detachable double cradle
- Suspension: Front: Inverted telescopic forks Rear: plunger
- Brakes: drums front & rear
- Tyres: 3.25 x 19
- Weight: MP-250: 130 kg (290 lb); S 300: 150 kg (330 lb) (wet)

In 1951, Hoffmann introduced the Gouverneur, a 250 cc four-stroke flat-twin engine motorcycle with shaft drive. The Gouverneur, designed by noted motorcycle designer Richard Küchen, expanded Hoffmann's range upmarket from their existing line of two-stroke ILO-engined motorcycles. Both the frame and the engine were new designs, and the development costs of the Gouverneur were very high. This was compounded by quality control problems caused by a workforce without experience in making engines.

In 1953, the Gouverneur's power output was increased from 11 hp (8.2 kW) at 4500 rpm to 14.5 hp (10.8 kW) at 4800 rpm

== Auto-Kabine ==
Hoffmann built the Auto-Kabine 250 microcar in the last quarter of 1954. This was a copy of the Isetta, using the Gouverneur's 250 cc flat-twin engine, and featuring a single suicide door on the right side of the car instead of the Isetta's door on the front. BMW, the official licence-holder for Isetta production in Germany, sued Hoffmann, forcing them to end production after selling slightly more than 100 Auto-Kabine 250s for DM 2,900 each.

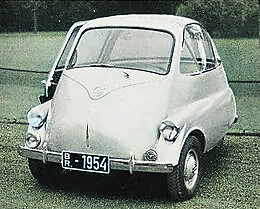
Hoffmann Kabine

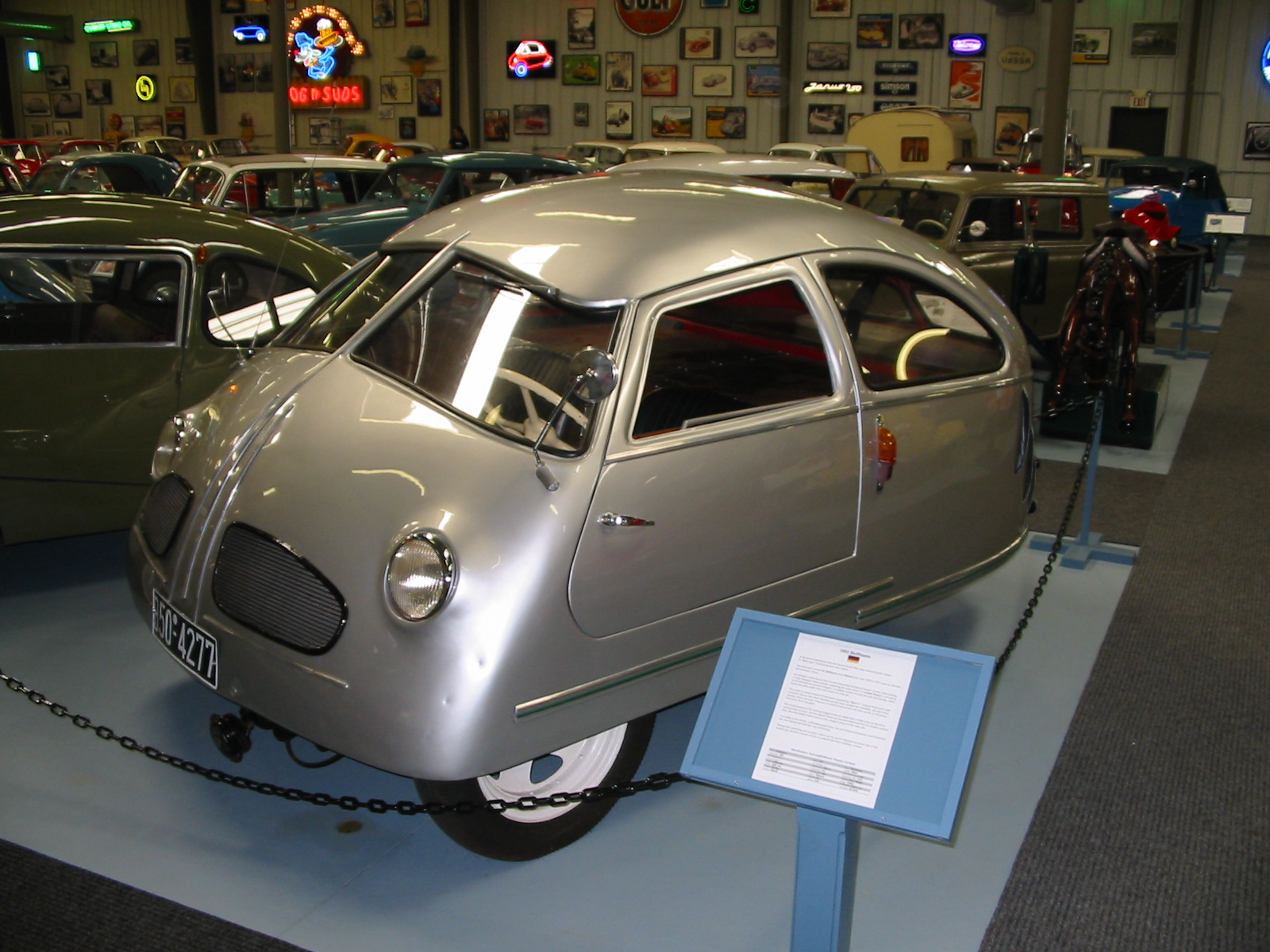
Hoffman The gear shift sequence

== Downfall ==
Hoffmann had invested heavily in developing the Gouverneur motorcycle, the Auto-Kabine microcar, and a more powerful version of the Vespa. None of these investments turned out to be profitable. The Governeur initially had quality control problems due to an inexperienced workforce and was later affected by a decrease in the motorcycle market as the German public increasingly turned to cars. Hoffmann was forced to end production of its Auto-Kabine microcar when BMW, holder of the license to build Isetta microcars, won its infringement lawsuit against Hoffmann. Most significantly, the marketing of Hoffmann's more powerful version of the Vespa caused Piaggio to withdraw their license. With Hoffmann's Vespa license gone, the creditors lost faith in the company and called in their loans, forcing them into bankruptcy.
