= Ratingen-Homberg =

Coordinates: 51.2934°N 6.9277°E

Ratingen-Homberg is that part of the city of Ratingen, in Mettman district, North Rhine-Westphalia that, until the bringing of industrialisation to the city, was the independent village of Homberg - at that time being in the district Homberg-Meiersberg, with its scenic churches, one Protestant and one Catholic.

== Landmarks ==
The older, Catholic church is devoted to Saint James. Both church towers together form the characteristic silhouette of Homberg ("Wiesnasen") in the surrounding meadows in the Bergisches Land.

== Residential areas ==
Homberg consists of an older (northern) part with about 1000 inhabitants, three taverns and two churches and a new residential area for about 5000 residents and one restaurant.

== History ==
The first documented reference to Homberg goes back to the year 1067.

In the twelfth century the Catholic Church devoted to James of Zebedee was built.

By middle of the 14th century Homberg was part of the district "Rheinamt Angermund" and had its own jurisdiction.

1684 the first Protestant church in Homberg was built, north of the village in "im Grund".

In 1685 - opposite to the Protestant church - a Protestant school was built.

The current Protestant church was built in 1912.

On August 14, 1959, new waterworks which continue to operate were opened.

In 1968 the school in Meiersberg closed, so did the confessional schools in Homberg and a common school was founded, using the common building of the former confessional schools within the settlement at Alt-Homberg.

In the 1970s Homberg was extended with residential areas south of the country road L2422 from Ratingen to Wülfrath (Meiersberger Straße), to occupy parts of the former Meiersberg area. Today, Homberg's only school ("Christian-Morgenstern-Schule") is in that southern area, as the former school was closed in the meantime.

=== Administrative history ===
As part of an ongoing restructuring of municipalities, Homberg-Bracht-Bellscheid became part of the new district "Amt Hubbelrath" in the county (land) Düsseldorf-Mettmann on 29 July 1929.

By 1. April 1967 the municipalities Homberg-Bracht-Bellscheidt and Meiersberg voluntarily merged to become Gemeinde Homberg-Meiersberg. It consisted of the village of Homberg as well as Hofermühle and Oberheide plus some solitary farms; it belonged to the jurisdiction of local court or "Amtsgericht" Ratingen.

By 1968, the municipalities of Amt Hubbelrath (Hasselbeck-Schwarzbach, Homberg-Meiersberg, Hubbelrath, Metzkausen) planned to merge in 1968 to be one single municipality named Hubbelrath. The great official North Rhine-Westphalia restructuring of that year stopped these plans.

Homberg-Meiersberg as a municipality only lasted for a short time and was split according to the restructuring law of 10 September 1974 effective 1 January 1975. Counties of the area of Mönchengladbach/Düsseldorf/Wuppertal were affected. Homberg village (both north and south area) was joined into Ratingen (together with the municipalities of Breitscheid, Eggerscheidt, Hösel und Lintorf) to be the new city of Ratingen in Mettmann County. Hofermühle was to be part of the city of Heiligenhaus, while some areas of Oberheide came to county-city Mettmann.

== Traffic ==
Homberg is connected to Ratingen via country road L422 (west) as well as to the federal highways A3 (Cologne-Oberhausen) and A44 (Velbert-Düsseldorf-Mönchengladbach), while L422 east goes to Wülfrath. Country Road L156 leads to Heiligenhaus (north) as well as Mettmann (south). Public transport access is done via the VRR regional transit bus lines 748 (Wülfrath-Mettmann), 761 (Homberg-Ratingen) and 771 (Velbert-Ratingen) - with switching via 759 in Ratingen to Düsseldorf International Airport (EDDL, DUS).

Since the Wülfrath industry sites are connected to highways mainly along L422 through Homberg, the heavy duty transport crossing the little village has been the focus of public debates and politicians' promises. Despite noise and accidents, no substantial improvements have been achieved.

== Leisure ==
Homberg is the starting point of biking or hiking tours in the Angertal (valley of the Anger river), which is reached via a scenic country road from the north end of the village. The valley itself is about 12 miles (19 km) from Ratingen to Wuelfrath, without a road for motor traffic but with a hiking path, the river and a remote railway line. A full tour would start at Ratingen and follow the Anger river upstream to Wuelfrath-Rohdenhaus via Flandersbacherstrasse K34, uphill through Wuelfrath and then return via road L422 back to Homberg.

A Glider airfield can be found 2 miles east of Homberg.
