= Ratingen-Lintorf =

Lintorf
- Quarter of Ratingen
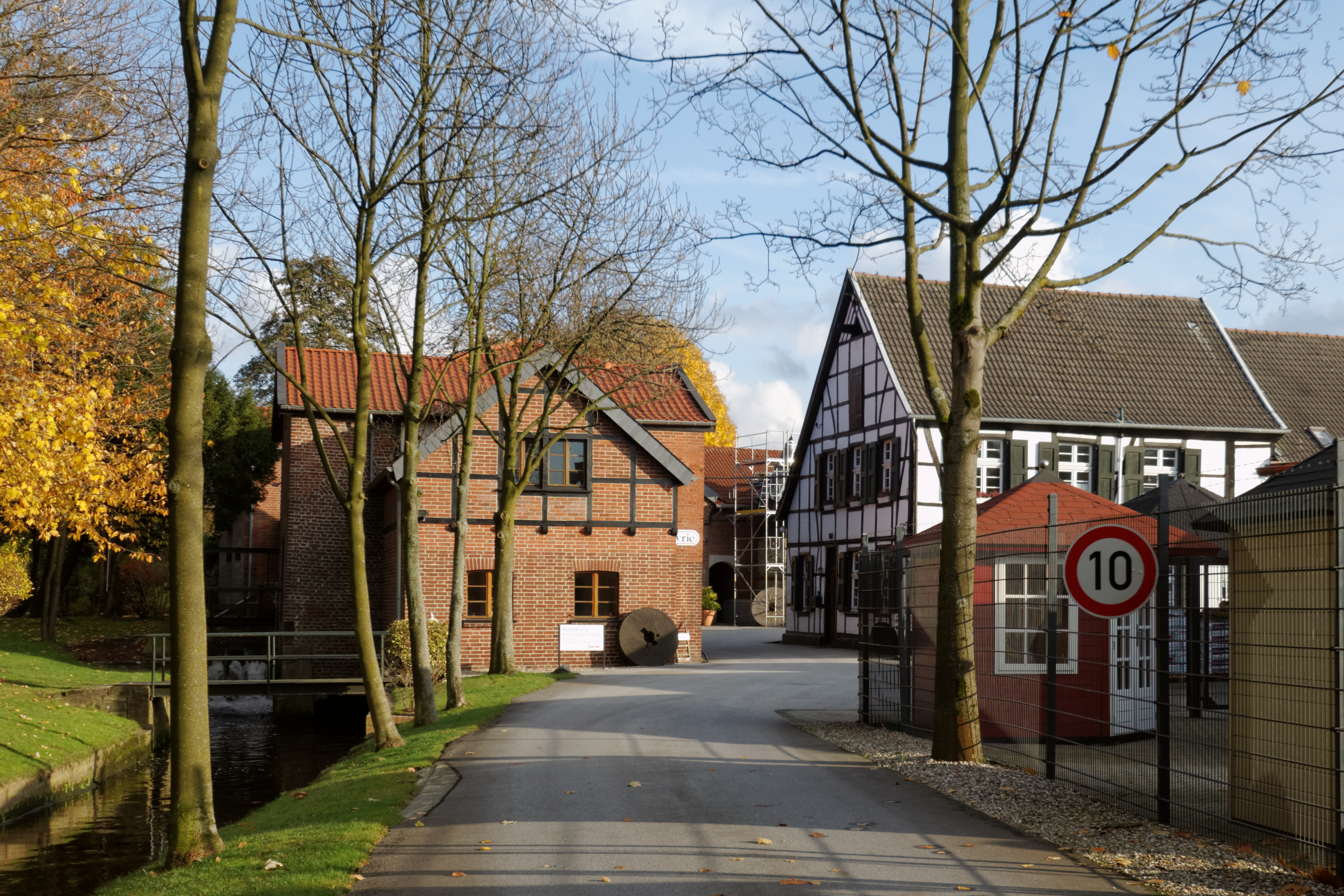
- Helpenstein mill, built before 1157

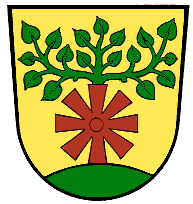
- Coat of arms
- Interactive map of Lintorf
- Location within Germany Location within North Rhine-Westphalia
- Coordinates: 51°19′58″N 06°49′51″E
- Country: Germany
- State: North Rhine-Westphalia
- Admin. region: Düsseldorf
- District: Mettmann
- Town: Ratingen

Area
  - Total: 16.85 km^{2} (6.51 sq mi)
- Elevation: 35–42 m (115–138 ft)

Population (2014)
  - Total: 15,162
  - Density: 899.8/km^{2} (2,331/sq mi)
- Time zone: UTC+01:00 (CET)
  - Summer (DST): UTC+02:00 (CEST)
- Postal codes: 40885
- Dialling codes: 02102
- Vehicle registration: ME
- Website: http://www.lintorf.de/

Lintorf is a village at the transition of the Berg region into the lower Rhine plain in North Rhine-Westphalia, Germany. Since 1975 it has been a quarter of the city of Ratingen.

== History, geography & transport ==
Lintorf was suburbanised in 1975. Ratingen belongs to the Mettmann district in the Düsseldorf region (North Rhine-Westphalia state). Before then, Lintorf was an independent municipality and seat of administration of Amt Angermund (since early 14th century; 1929-1950 "Amt Ratingen-Land"; 1950-1974 "Amt Angerland").

Lintorf is on the Cologne-Ratingen-Duisburg line, but since 1985 has had no train stations. The place is connected by autobahns A52 (Essen—Düsseldorf, exit Ratingen Tiefenbroich), A524 (autobahn interchange Breitscheid—Krefeld, exit Ratingen-Lintorf), A3 (Oberhausen—Cologne, exit A52). The old boundary lies in the northern edge of the approach lane of the Düsseldorf Airport (3 km runway).

Lintorf was the site of a displaced persons camp after World War II, providing a home for Ukrainians, Poles and Yugoslavs awaiting immigration. Ratingen has been the site of a war crime in April 1945. The bodies of eight German anti-Nazis, one woman and two Polish men were found lying in woods near the town.

In the first half of the 20th century, lead, clay and gravel was mined. In the period after World War II, the auto manufacturer Hoffmann (licensed production of the Vespa scooter), the company Constructa (washing machines), as well as the company Hünnebeck (metal scaffold construction).

A rural scattered housing estate developed in the time after World War II from suburban residents of the surrounding cities, primarily from Düsseldorf (12 km). The surrounding forests are a popular scenic area.

Since 19th century, population has grown from 872 (1816) to 15,162 (2014).

== Gallery ==
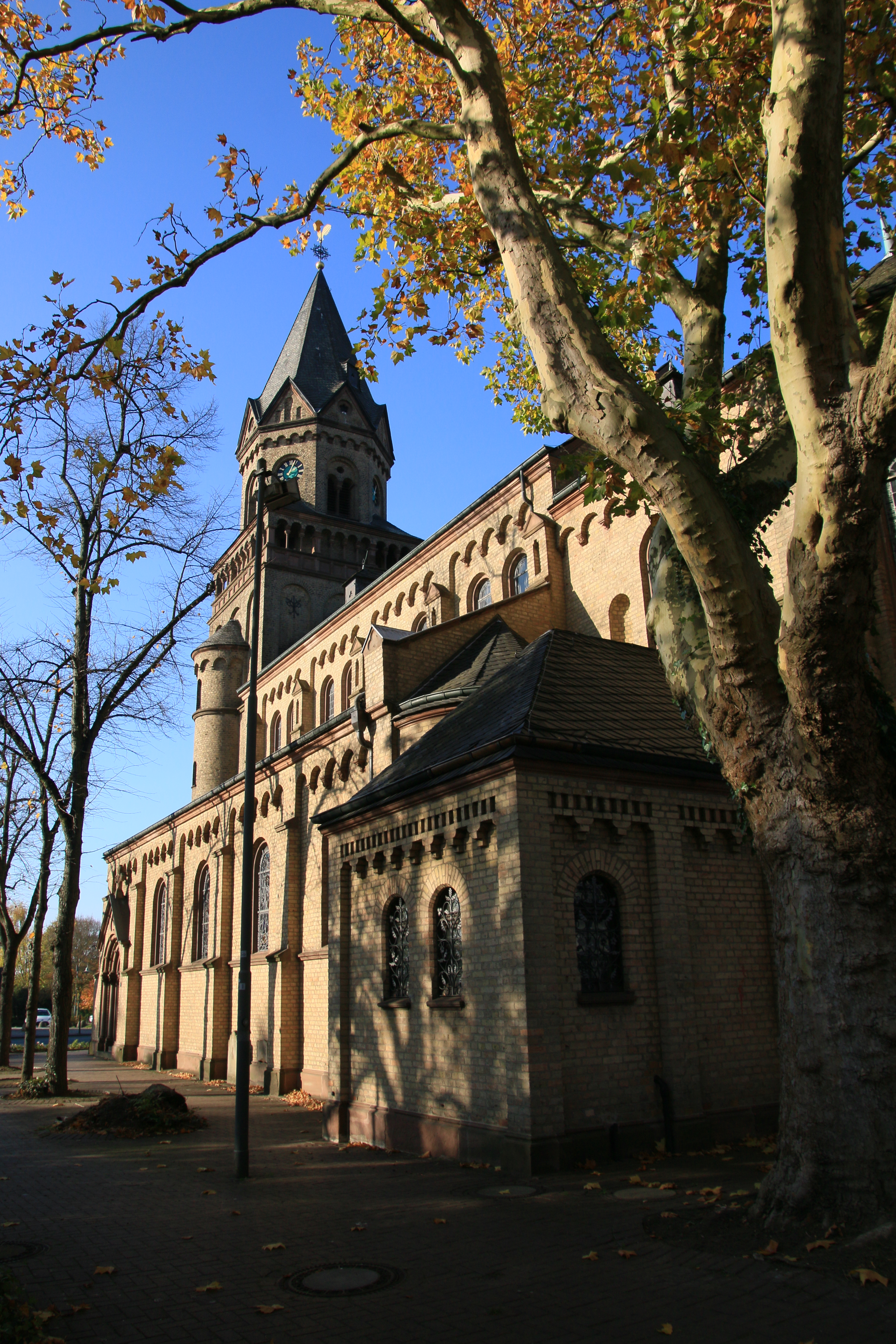
Catholic church St. Anna

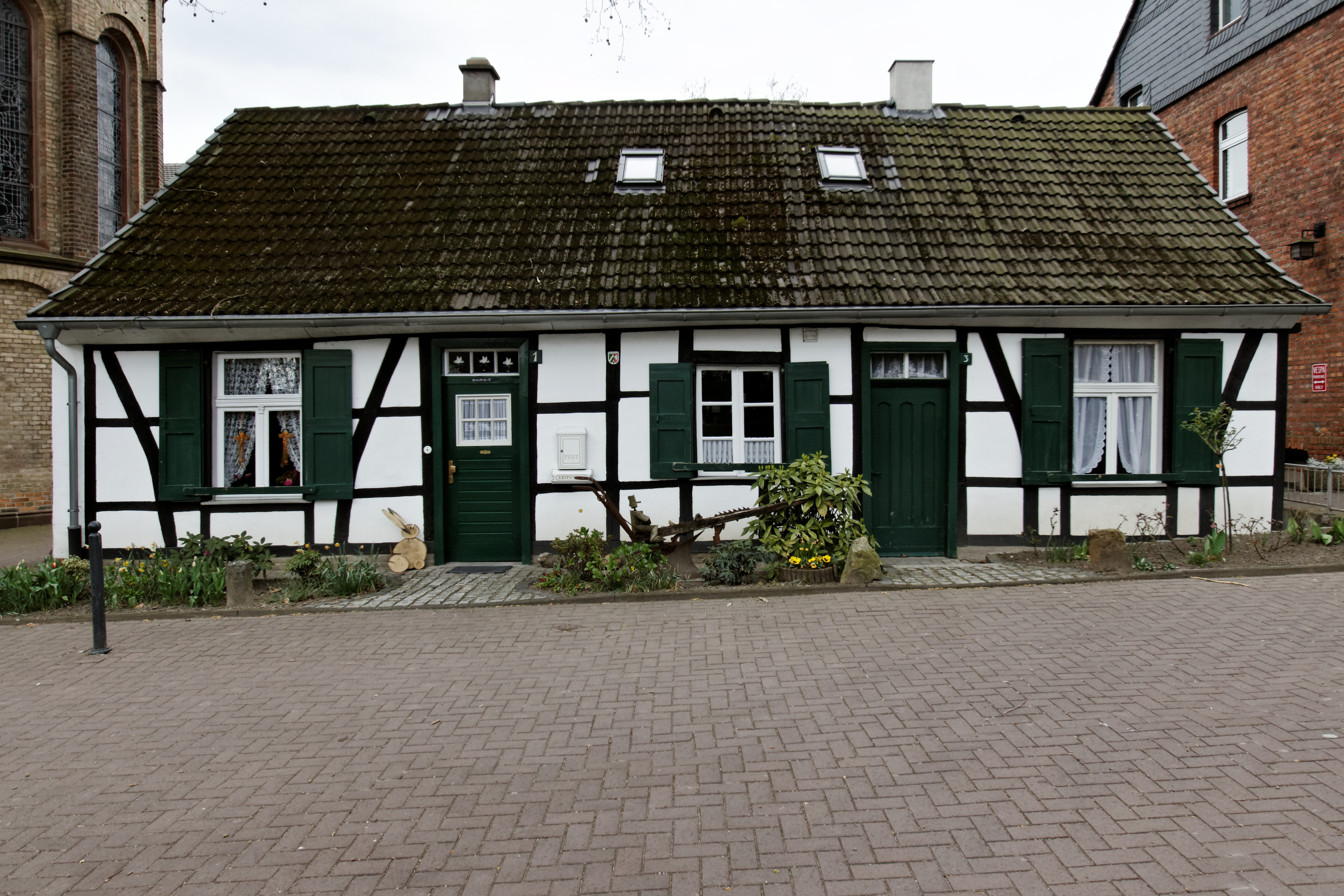
Ulenbroich 1-3

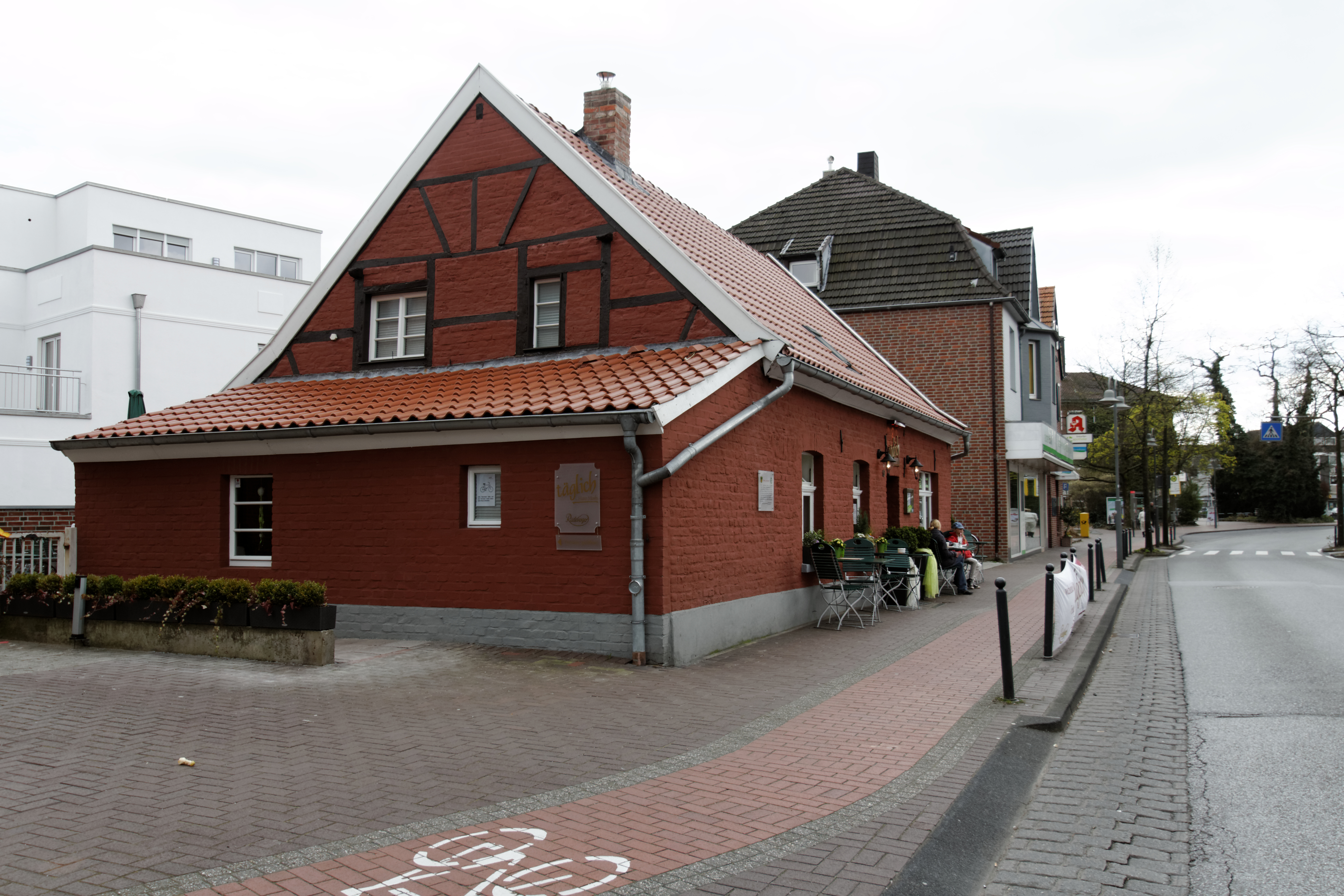
Haus Merks

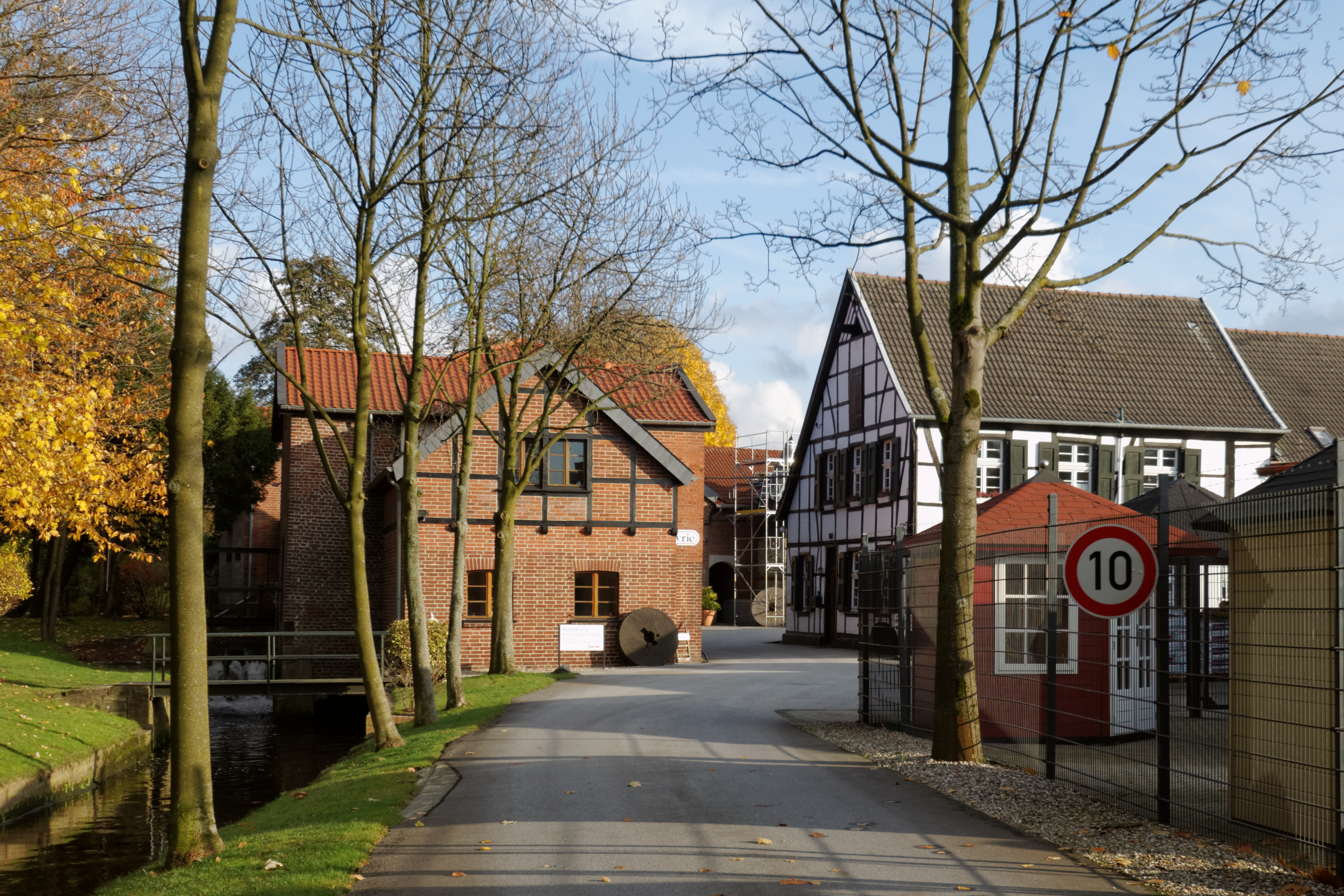
Helpenstein mill, est. 1157

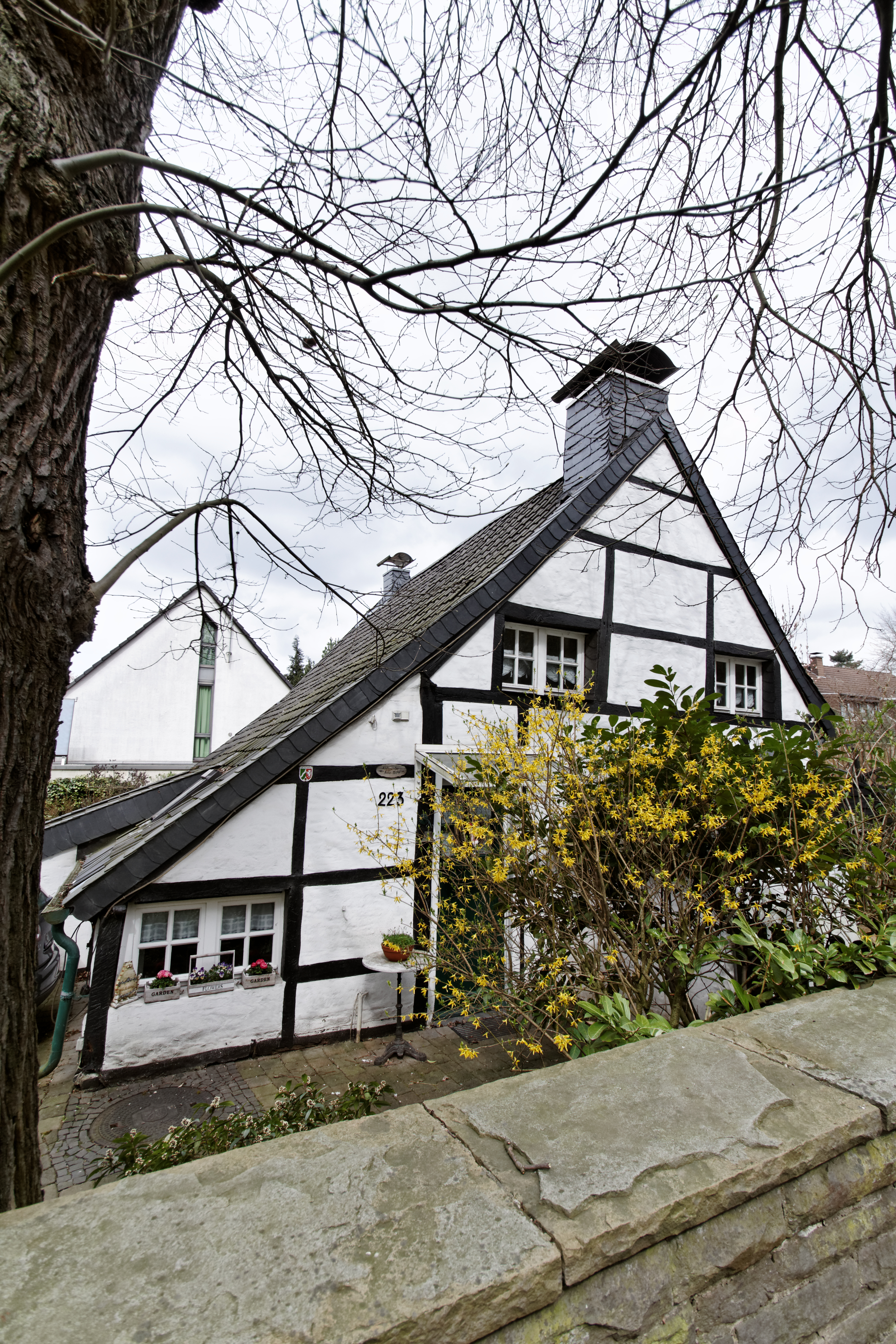
Krummenweger Str. 223

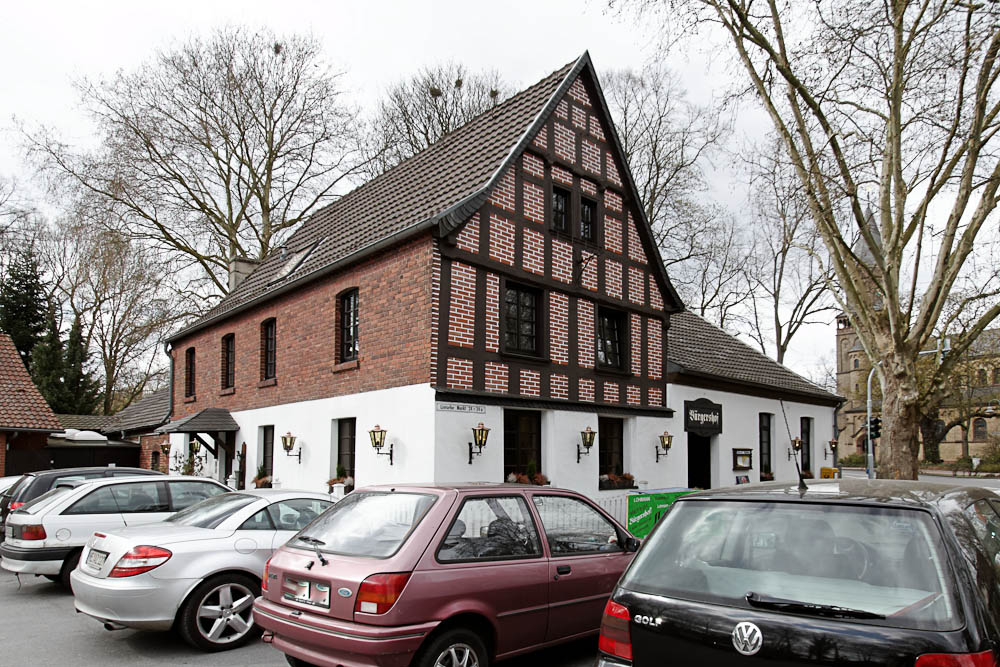
Lintorfer Markt 24

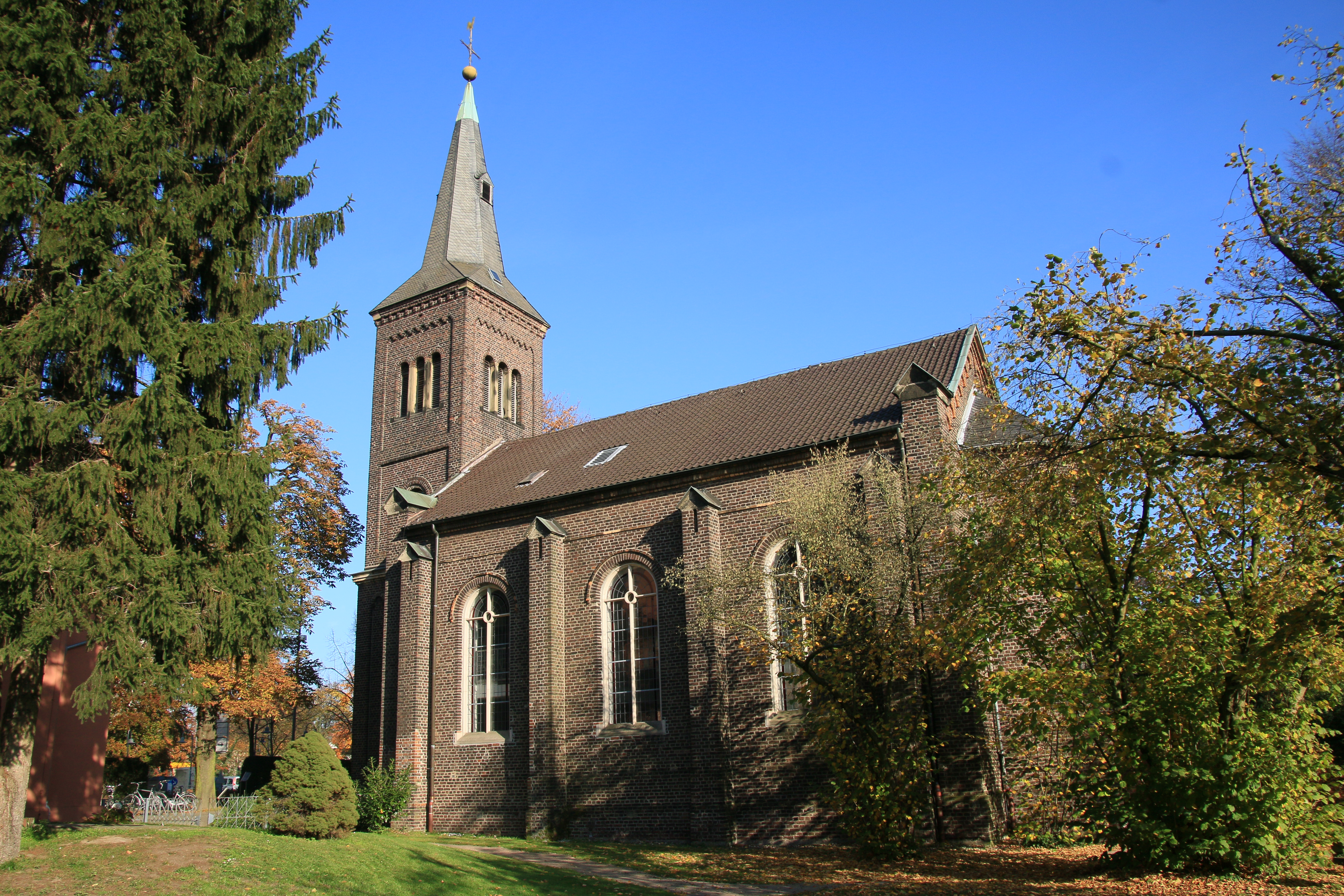
Protestant church

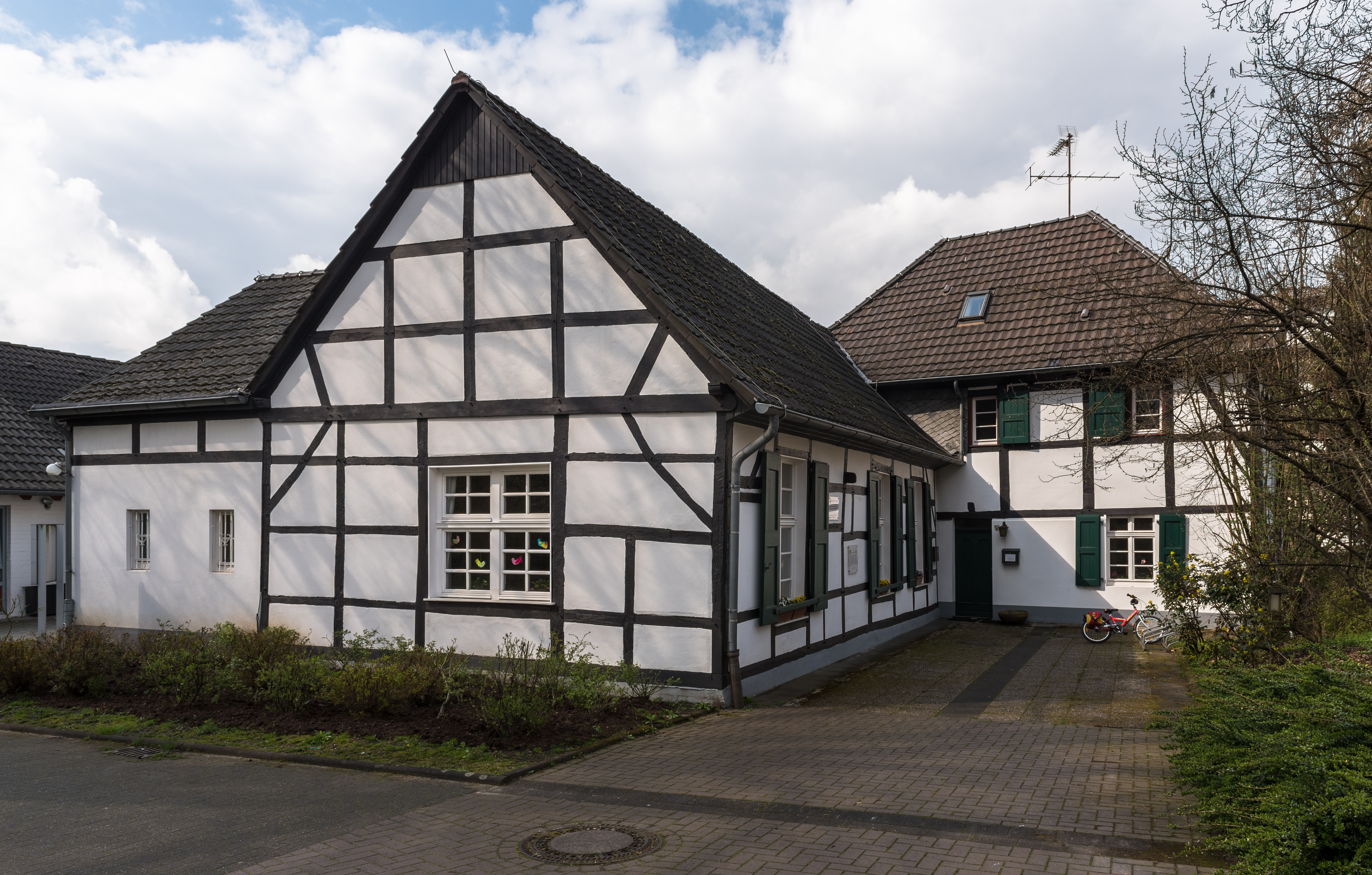
Lintorfer Markt 20

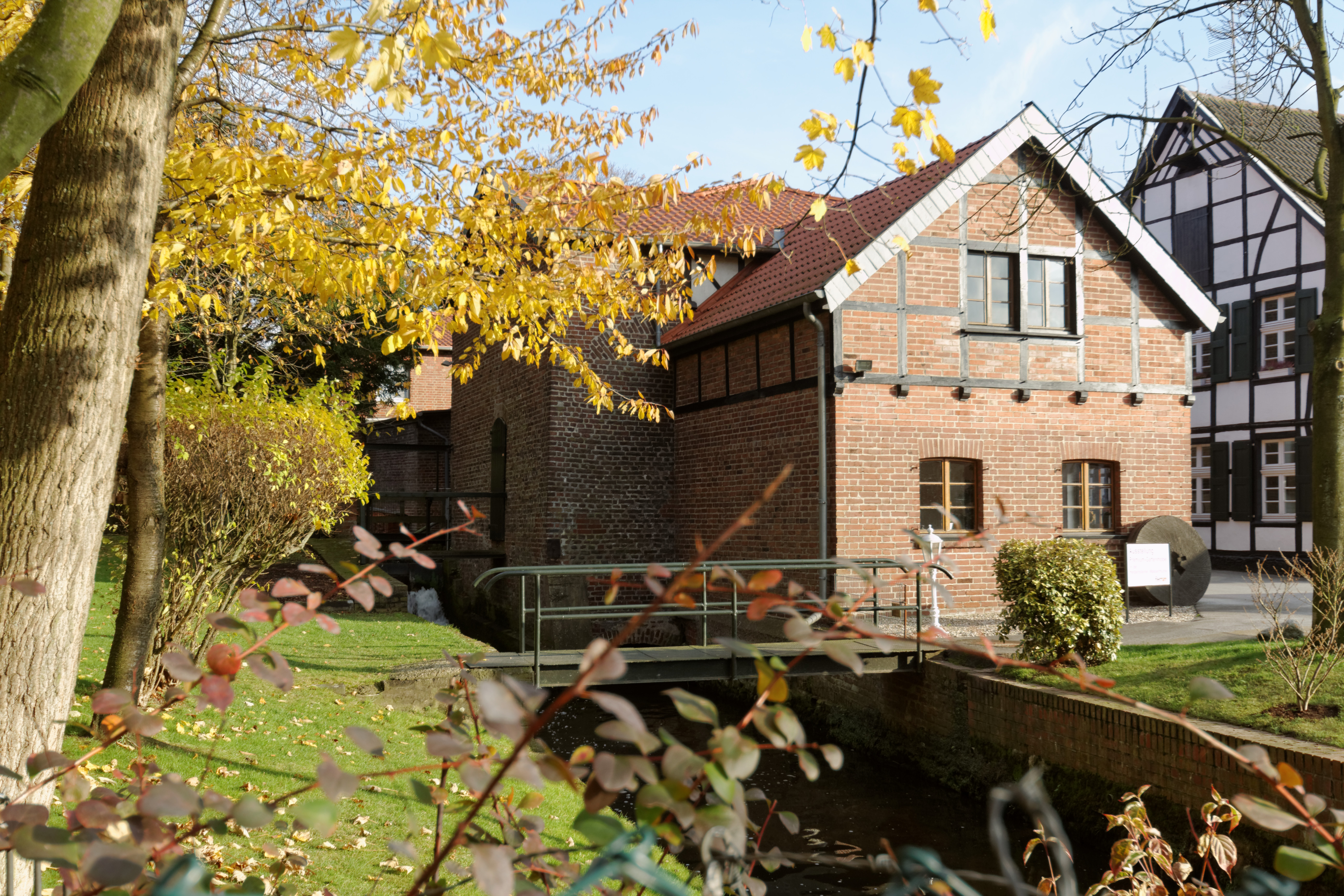
Helpenstein mill

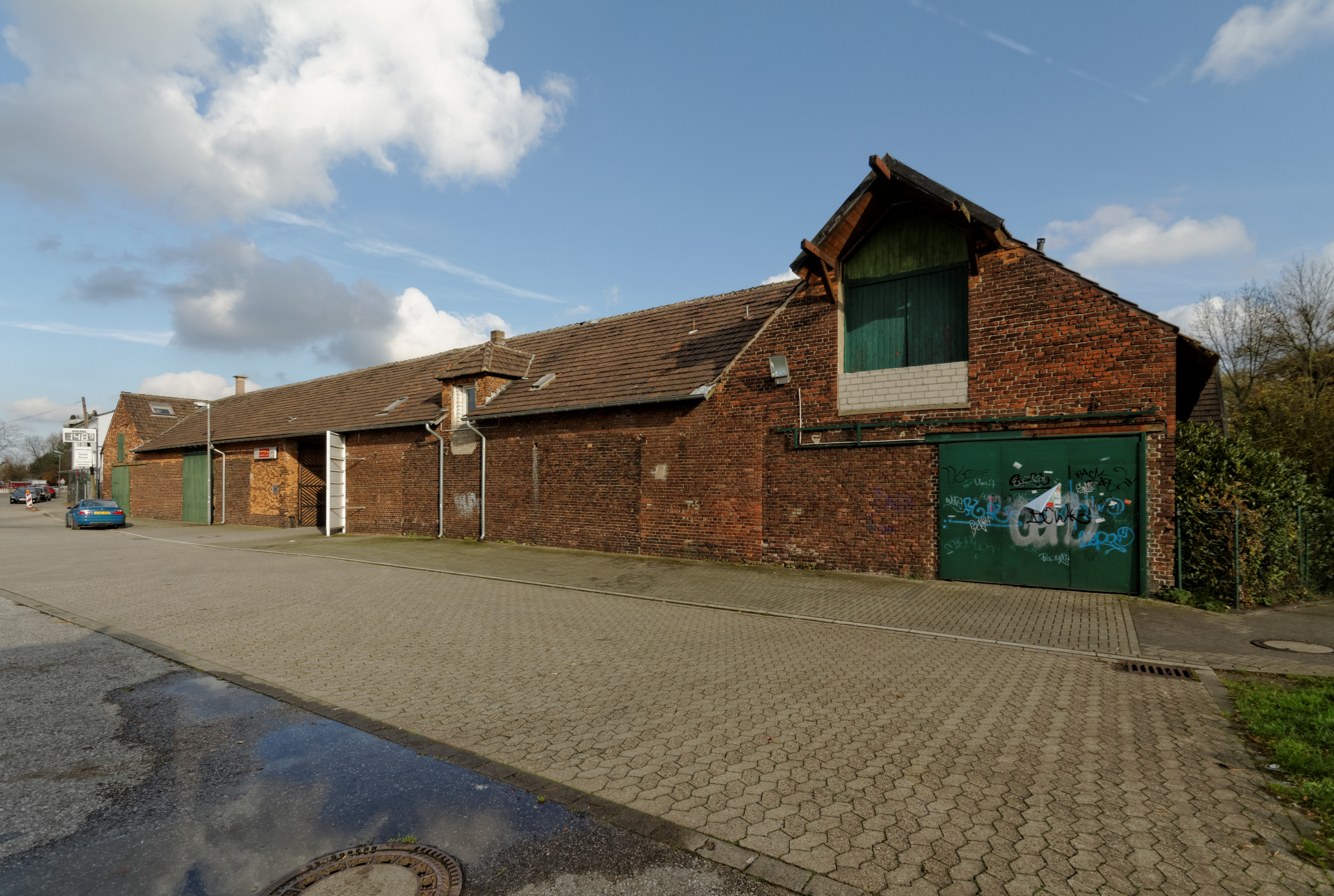
Beekerhof

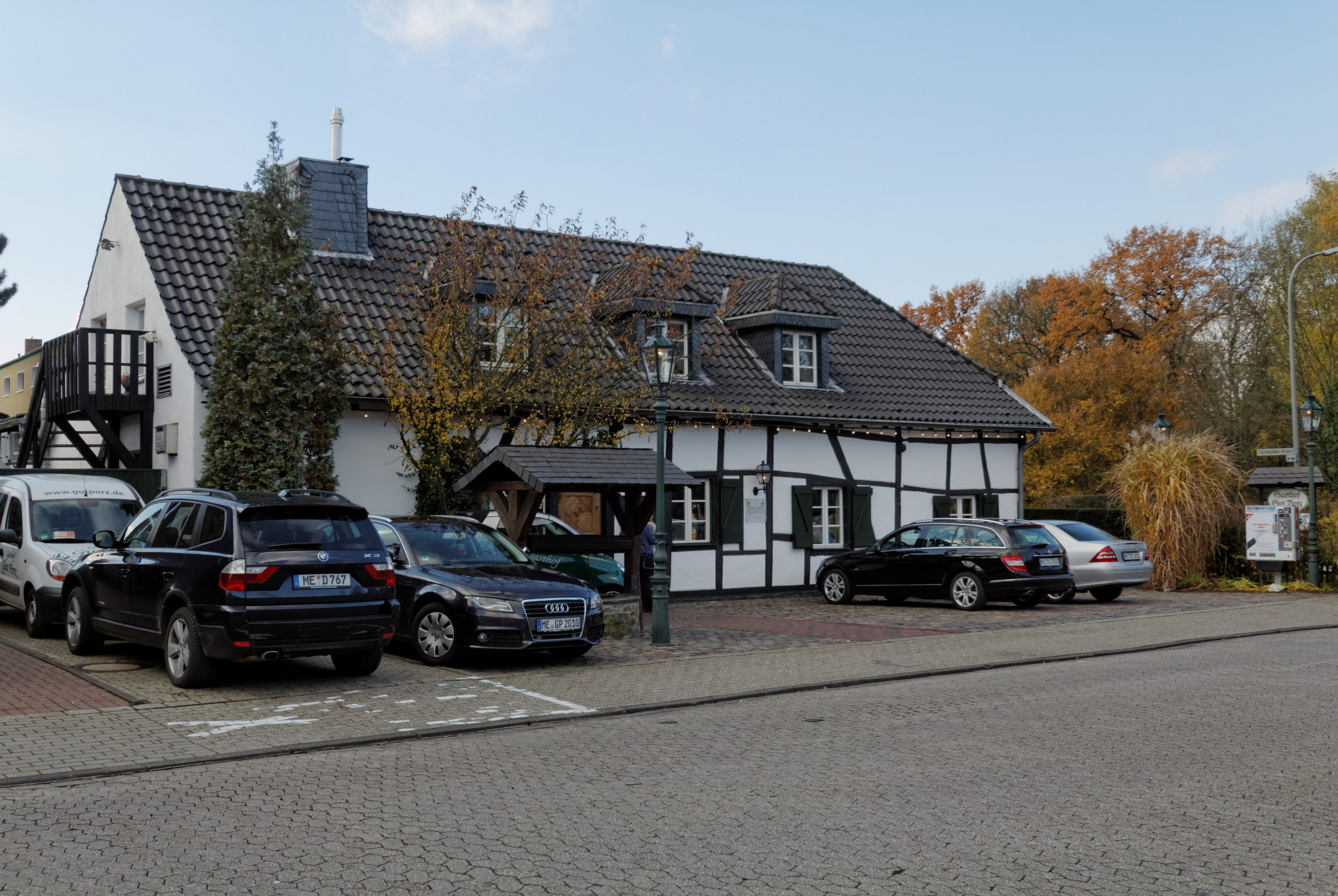
Gut Porz

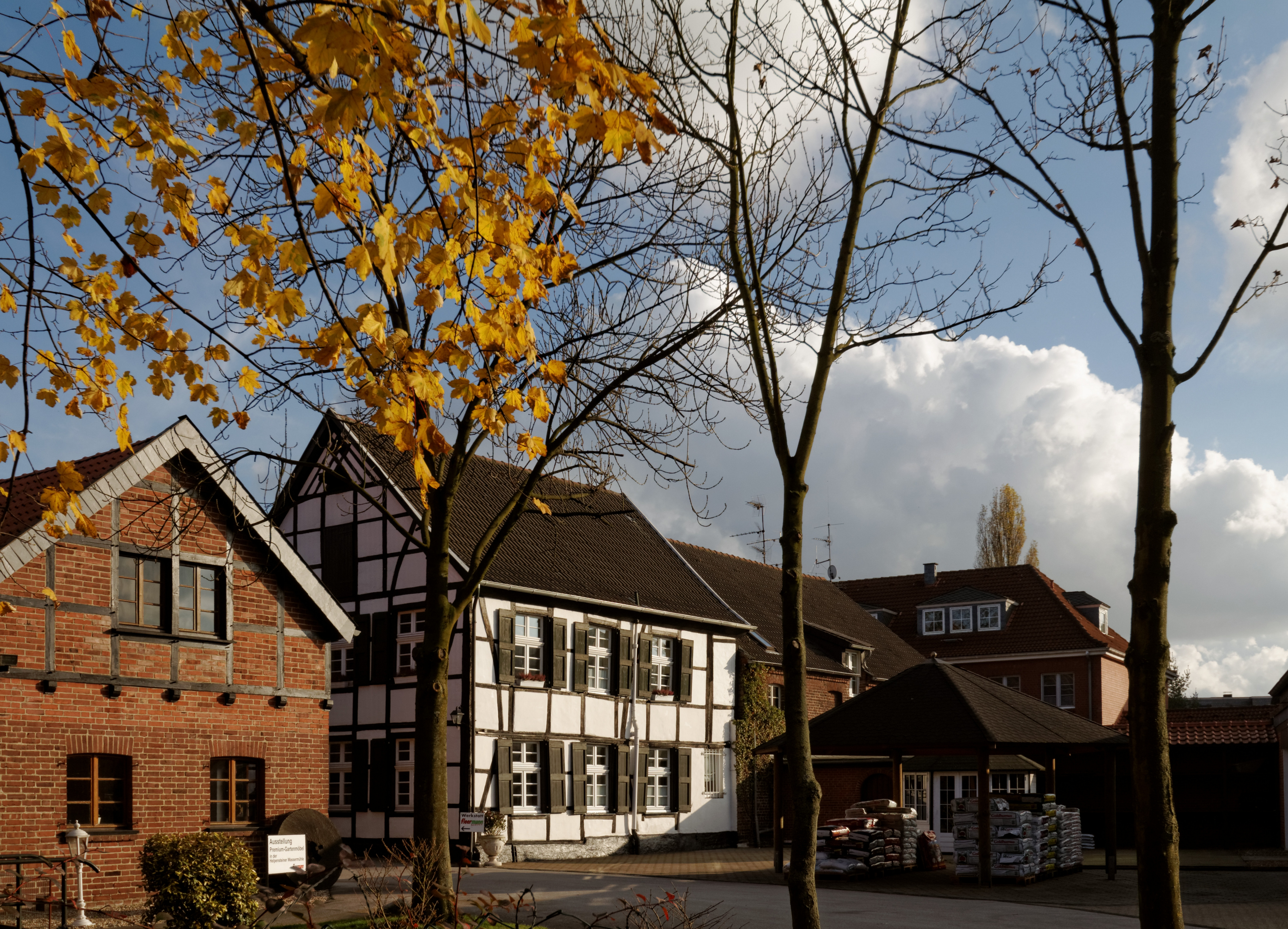
Helpenstein mill

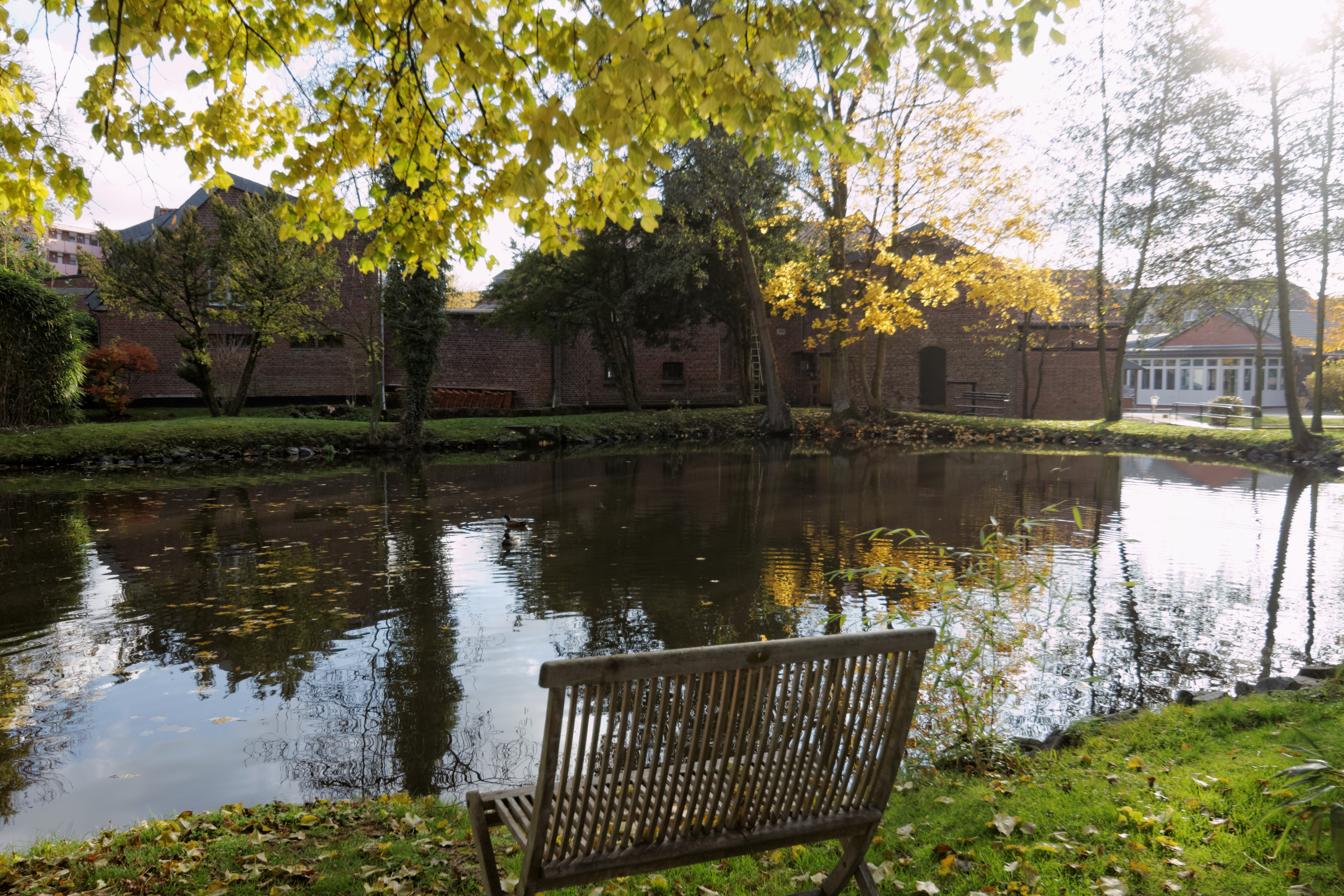
Helpenstein mill and Dickelsbach
("little dyke" brook)

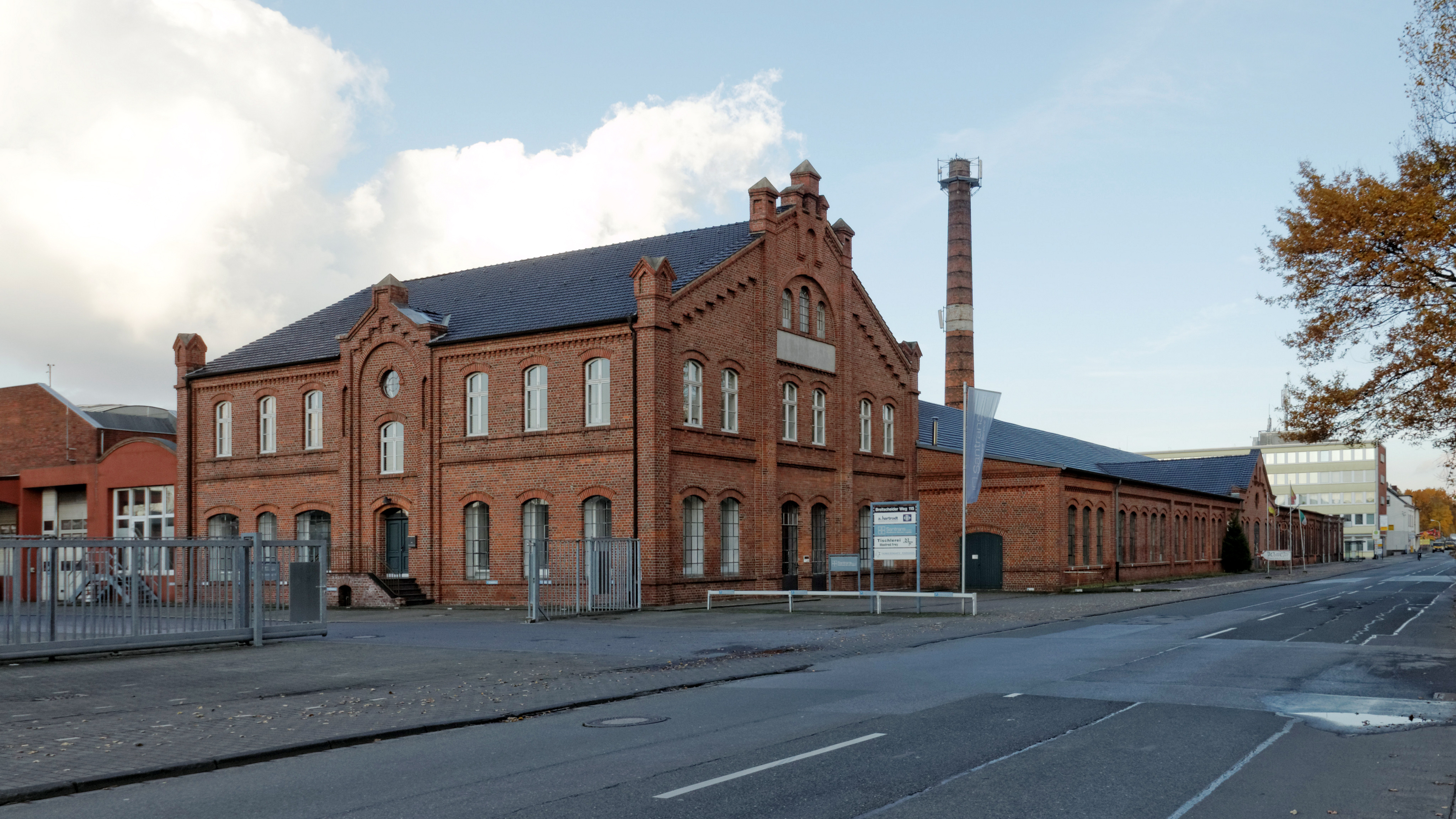
Hoffmann factory

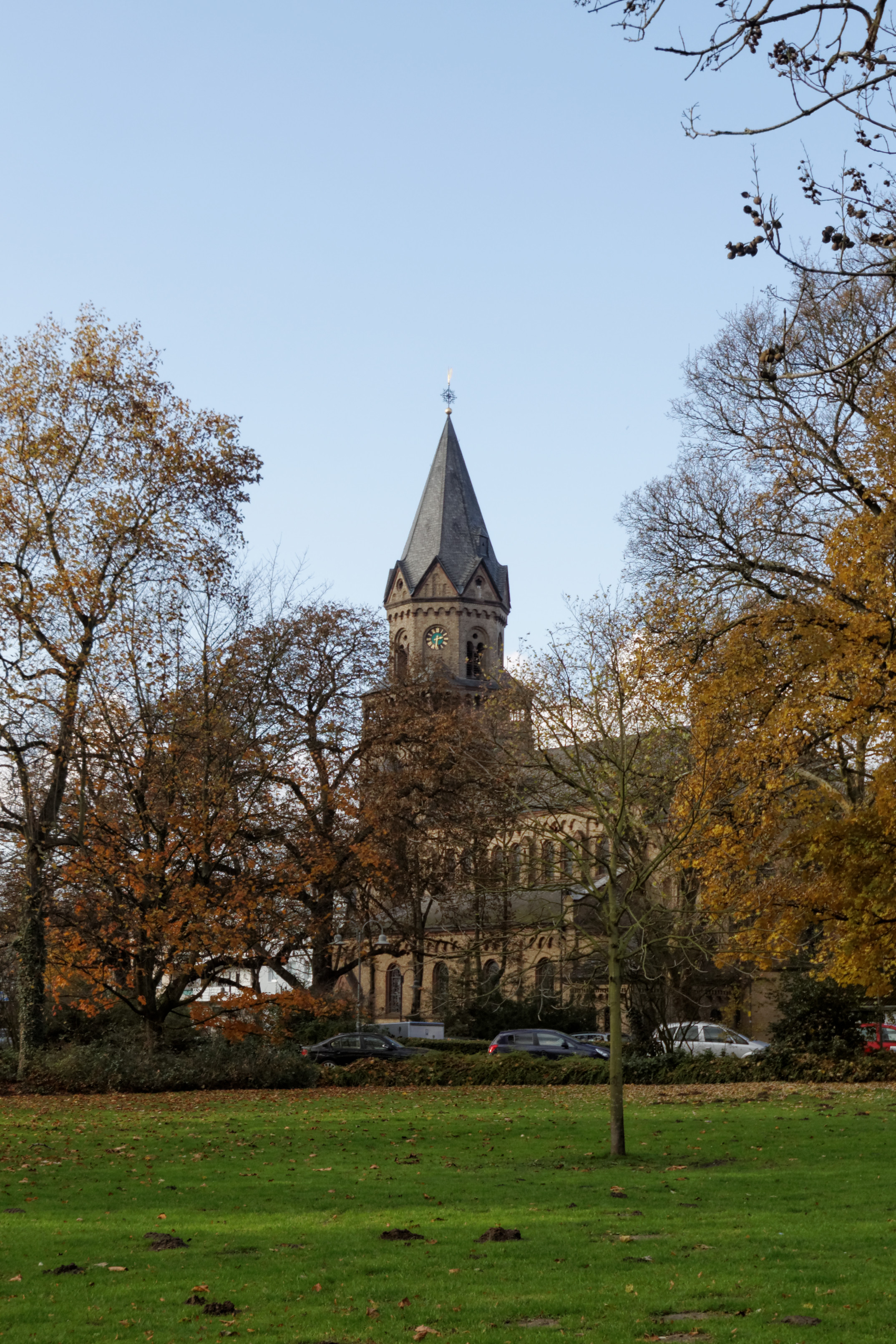
Catholic church Saint Anna

== Notable people ==
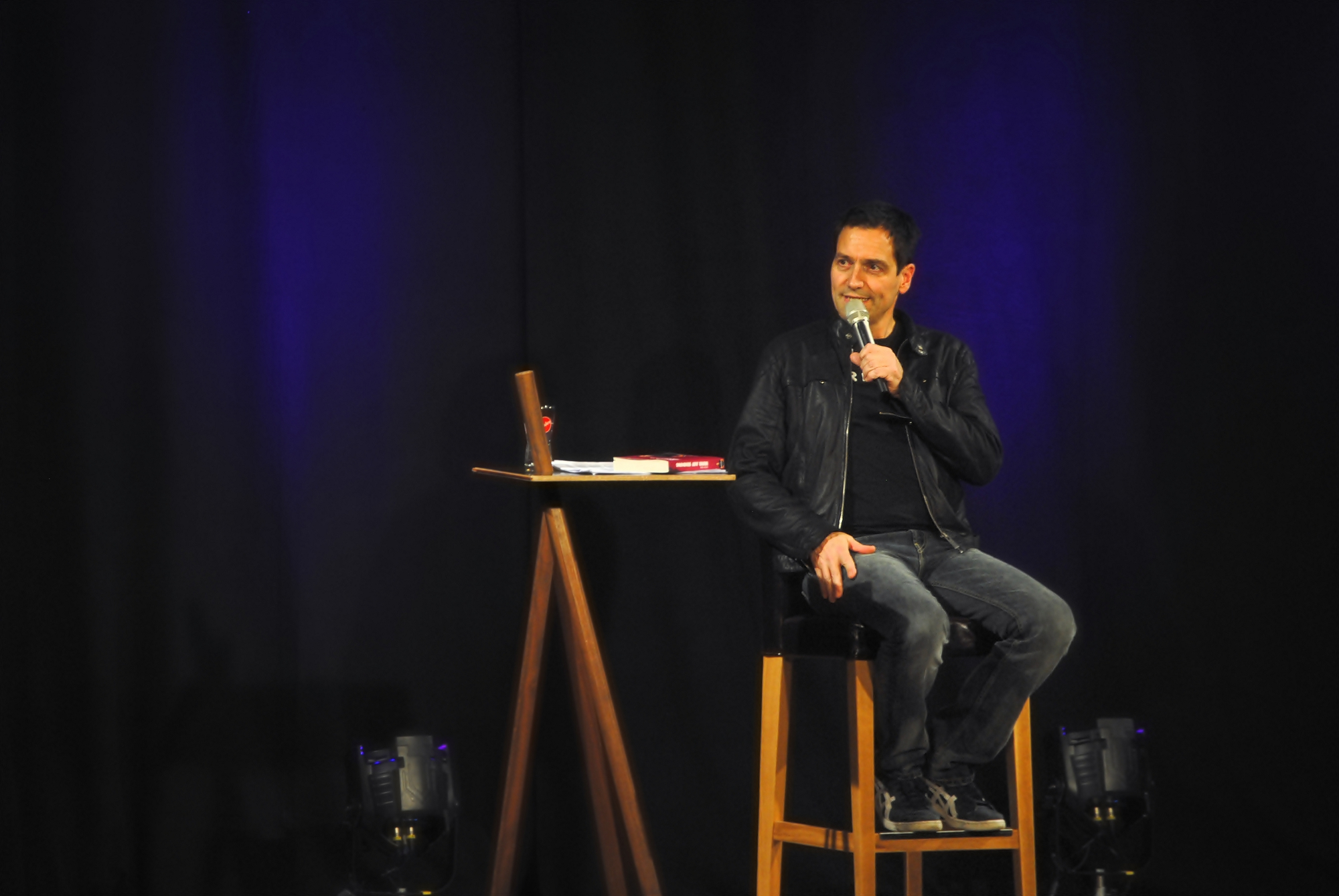
Comedian Dieter Nuhr has lived in Lintorf with his wife and daughter since 2006

- Johann Peter Melchior (1747–1825), sculptor and porcelain artist
- Jakob Oswald Hoffmann (1896–1972), entrepreneur (Hoffmann-Werke Lintorf)
- Kurt Krüger (1920–2003), footballer
- Bastian Fleermann, historian
- Dieter Nuhr (born 1960), comedian, kabarettist (German cabaret, mostly political satire) and author
