= Johann Peter Melchior =

German artist

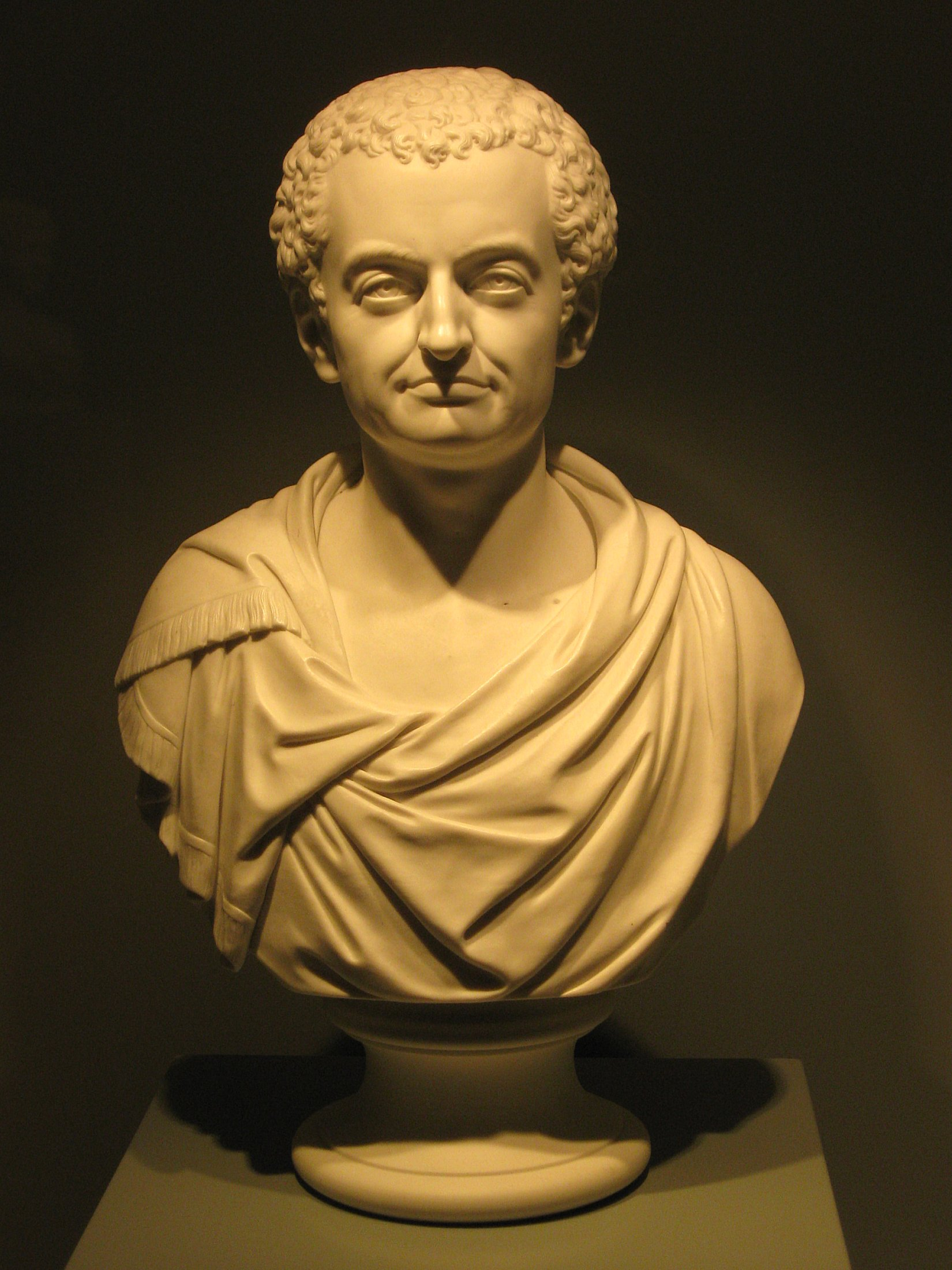
Bust of Maximilian von Montgelas by Johann Peter Melchior

Johann Peter Melchior (8 March 1747 – 13 June 1825) was a German porcelain modeller.

Melchior was born in Lintorf. He was interested in art from an early age and was apprenticed to a sculptor in Düsseldorf. He made a name for himself in the porcelain trade and was named Modellmeister at the acclaimed Höchst porcelain factory in 1767, a post he held until 1779. He later worked at the factories at Frankenthal (1779–93) and Nymphenburg (1797–1822). He died in Nymphenburg.

Melchior was a transitional figure between Rococo and Neoclassicism. His early work was graceful and often sentimental, and his favourite subjects included religious groups, pastoral scenes, characters from mythology, and children. As his career progressed, his works became less sentimental and more neoclassical.
