= Büyen =

River in Kazakhstan

Location
- Country: Kazakhstan

Physical characteristics
- Mouth: Jalkum desert
  - coordinates: 45.6516°N 79.094°E

The Büyen (Kazakh: Бүйен, Büien) is a river of Kazakhstan. Its source is in the Dzungarian Alatau. It flows to the north, parallel to the Aksu to its east, and vanishes in the Jalkum desert south of Lake Balkhash. The Bronze Age settlement Tasbas is located in the upper Büyen valley.
