= Lepsy =

Lepsy Лепсі
- Village
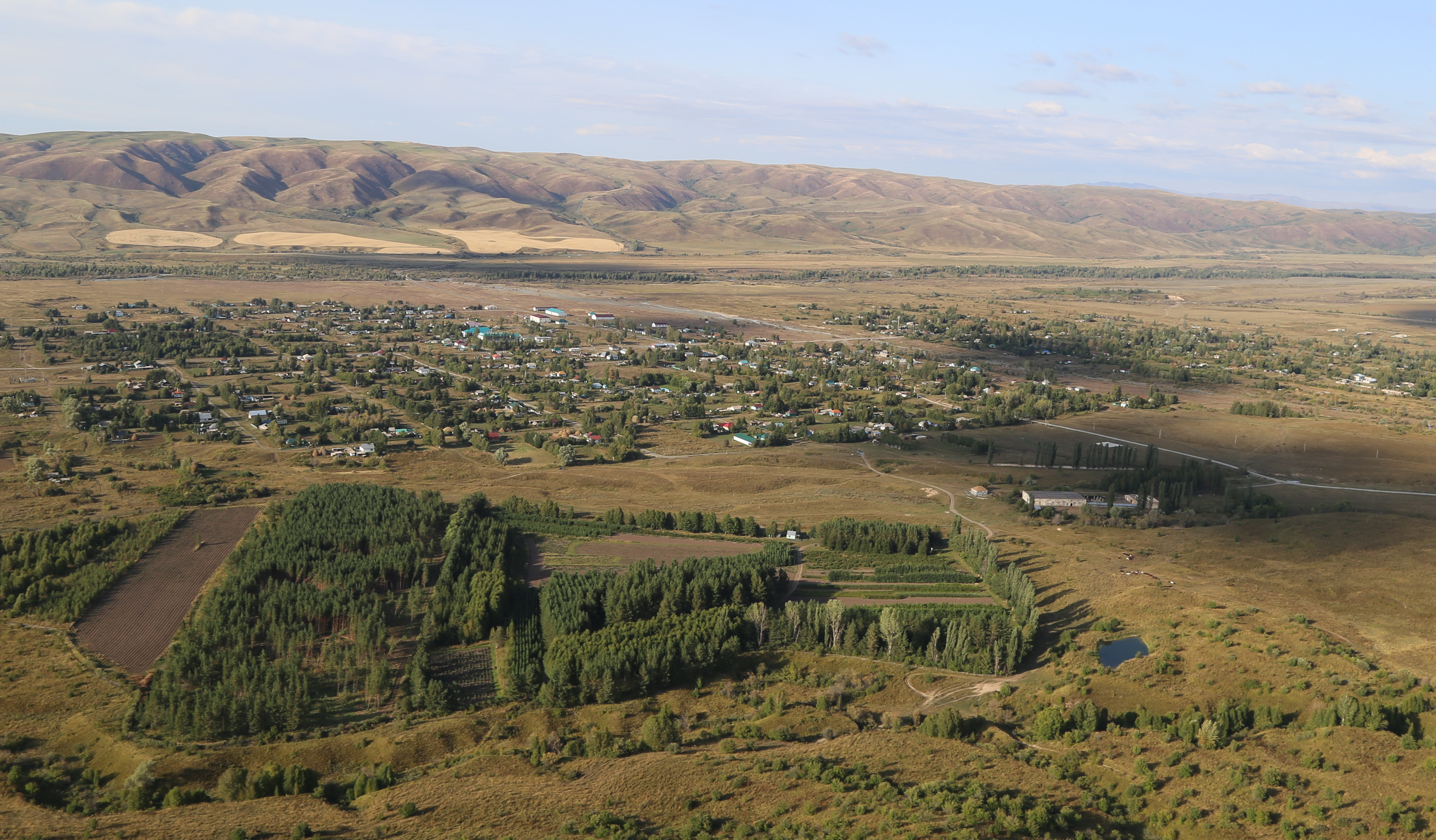

- Location in Kazakhstan
- Coordinates: 45°31′43″N 80°37′00″E
- Country: Kazakhstan
- Region: Almaty Region
- District: Alakol District

Population (2009)
  - Total: 1,151
- Time zone: UTC+6 (Omsk Time)

Lepsy (Kazakh: Лепсі, Lepsı; before 2010, Lepsinsk) is a village in Alakol District, Almaty Region, in south-eastern Kazakhstan. It is the administrative seat of Lepsy Village District, which also includes the villages of Baizerek (Байзерек, pop. 106), Zhunzhurek (Жунжурек, pop. 79) and Chumbulak (Чимбулак, pop. 106). It is located on the northern end of the Dzungarian Alatau, near the headwaters of the Lepsy River.

The settlement was founded in 1846. By 1918, there were a separate village and town, both called Lepsinsk. In 1913, 6249 people lived in the village and 8764 people lived in the city. In 1936 the city lost its status and the two settlements were merged into the village Lepsinsk. Since 2010, it was renamed Lepsy.

== Climate ==
Lepsy has a humid continental climate (Köppen: Dfb), with mild summers and frigid, snowy winters.

Climate data for Lepsy (1991–2020)
Month	Jan	Feb	Mar	Apr	May	Jun	Jul	Aug	Sep	Oct	Nov	Dec	Year
Mean daily maximum °C (°F)	−9.7 (14.5)	−5.0 (23.0)	3.9 (39.0)	15.4 (59.7)	21.1 (70.0)	25.5 (77.9)	27.3 (81.1)	26.9 (80.4)	21.9 (71.4)	14.2 (57.6)	2.1 (35.8)	−6.9 (19.6)	11.4 (52.5)
Daily mean °C (°F)	−16.2 (2.8)	−12.3 (9.9)	−4.1 (24.6)	6.5 (43.7)	12.0 (53.6)	16.3 (61.3)	17.9 (64.2)	16.3 (61.3)	11.0 (51.8)	4.0 (39.2)	−5.2 (22.6)	−13.1 (8.4)	2.8 (37.0)
Mean daily minimum °C (°F)	−21.4 (−6.5)	−18.0 (−0.4)	−10.0 (14.0)	−0.8 (30.6)	3.8 (38.8)	8.1 (46.6)	9.6 (49.3)	7.1 (44.8)	2.0 (35.6)	−2.9 (26.8)	−10.2 (13.6)	−18.1 (−0.6)	−4.2 (24.4)
Average precipitation mm (inches)	48.6 (1.91)	42.6 (1.68)	54.1 (2.13)	75.8 (2.98)	83.4 (3.28)	65.7 (2.59)	73.9 (2.91)	44.5 (1.75)	36.1 (1.42)	56.2 (2.21)	75.8 (2.98)	59.7 (2.35)	716.4 (28.20)
Average precipitation days (≥ 1.0 mm)	8.2	7.7	7.8	9.0	9.2	8.2	9.3	5.7	4.8	7.1	9.2	8.9	95.1
Source: NOAA
