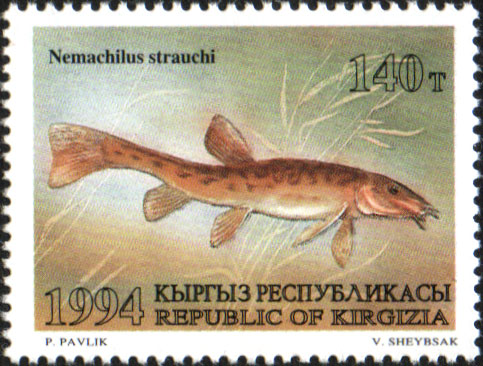
- Triplophysa strauchii on a stamp in Kyrgyzstan

Conservation status
- Least Concern (IUCN 3.1)

Scientific classification
- Kingdom: Animalia
- Phylum: Chordata
- Class: Actinopterygii
- Order: Cypriniformes
- Family: Nemacheilidae
- Genus: Triplophysa
- Species: T. strauchii

Binomial name
- Triplophysa strauchii (Kessler, 1874)

Synonyms
- Diplophysa strauchii; Nemacheilus strauchii; Nemachilus strauchi

= Spotted thicklip loach =

Species of fish

Triplophysa strauchii, the spotted thicklip loach, is a species of ray-finned fish in the genus Triplophysa. It is widespread in the basins of Balkhash, Issyk-Kul, Sassyk-Kul and Ala-Kul, and basins of Lake Zaysan, in Tarim Basin. It can grow up to 25 cm (9.8 in) in length.
