= Balkhash-Alakol Basin =

Plain in Kazakhstan

Balkhash-Alakol Basin Балқаш-Алакөл ойысы Балхаш-Алакольская котловина
- Basin
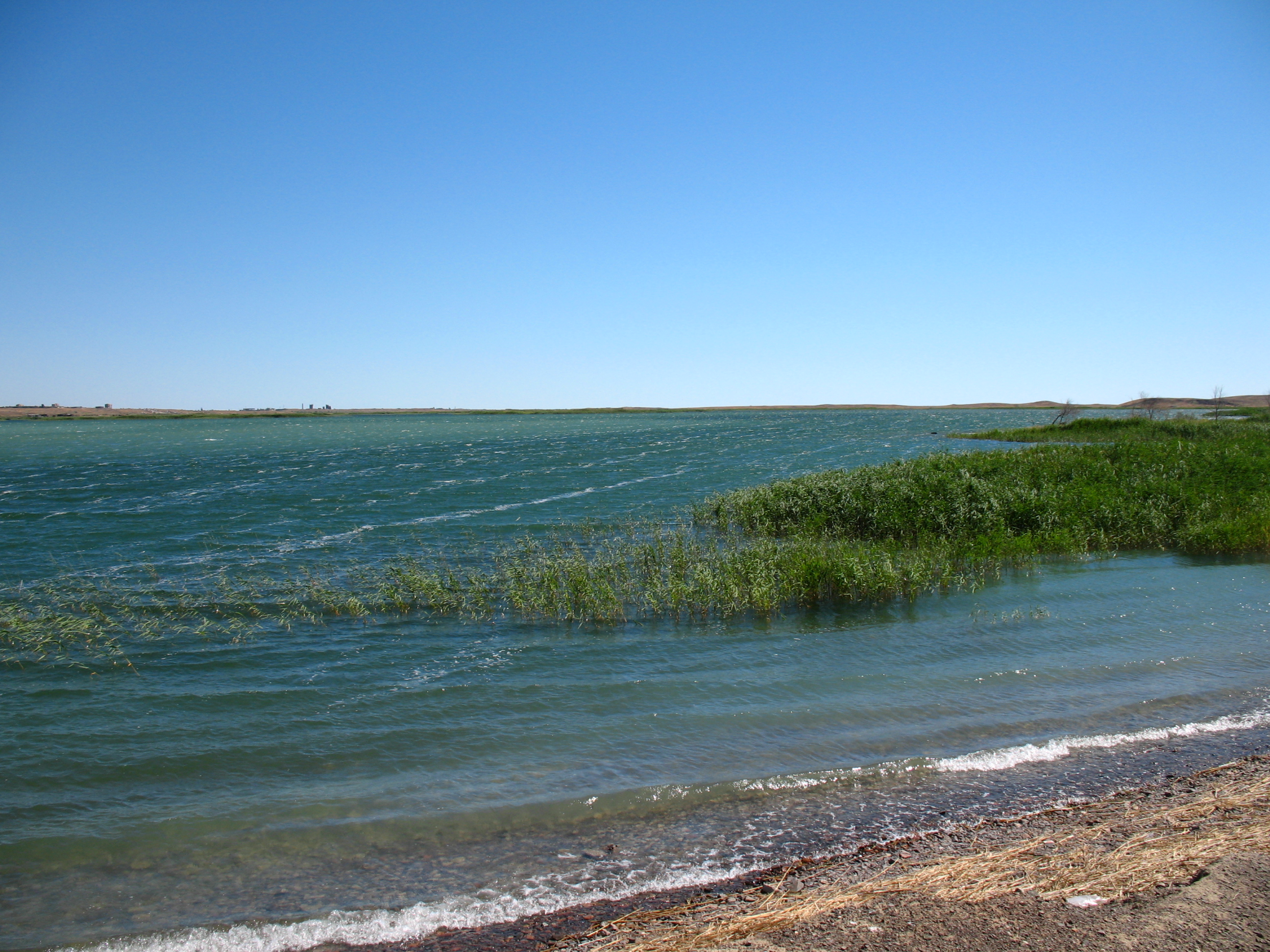
- View of the shores of Lake Balkhash, the main waterbody of the basin

- Location in Kazakhstan
- Coordinates: 46°0′N 77°30′E
- Location: Kazakhstan
- Part of: Karaganda Region, Zhambyl Region, Almaty Region and East Kazakhstan Region

Area
  - Total: ca 22,000 km^{2} (8,500 sq mi)

Dimensions
  - Length: 700 km (430 mi)
  - Width: 100 km (62 mi) to 300 km (190 mi)
- Elevation: 342 m (1,122 ft) to 600 m (2,000 ft)

The Balkhash-Alakol Basin or Balkhash-Alakol Depression(Kazakh: Балқаш-Алакөл ойысы; Russian: Балхаш-Алакольская котловина), is a flat structural basin in southeastern Kazakhstan.

The basin is named after lakes Balkhash and Alakol, the largest waterbodies in the trough. The main city in the area is Balkhash.

== Geology ==
The basin was formed as a result of a trough that filled with river sediments. In the Carboniferous the whole area was part of the ancient Dzhungarian Sea, a vestige of the Palaeoasian Ocean. This ancient sea disappeared in the Permian. By the Eocene the Khankhai Sea took shape and filled with saltwater, covering roughly the area of the present-day basin with an eastern extension that included Lake Zaysan and reached further eastwards into the Gobi Lakes. In the Oligocene this sea dried up, leaving residual lakes, including Balkhash, Alakol, Zaisan and Gobi.

In the Miocene the Balkhash depression filled with sediments and lake Balkhash became shallow and desalinated. At the same time, Alakol and Zaisan were merged into a single lake. In the Pliocene and Pleistocene, tectonic processes intensified, causing the entire depression to deepen. The rising Tarbagatai Range split the fresh Zaysan and the brackish Alakol into independent lakes, causing them to significantly decrease in size. Balkhash, however, became larger and divided into a fresh western and a salty eastern part that characterize its present configuration. At the same time, the formation of the Ili, Karatal and other river valleys began. Also during the Pleistocene, glaciations and intensive ice melting resulted in the Balkash deepening and increasing in size, reconnecting with the Alakol as a single lake. By the Holocene, however, the area became shallow and the single body of water split up into modern lakes Balkhash, Alakol and Sasykkol.

== Geography ==
The Balkhash-Alakol Basin stretches roughly from east to west for about 100 km (62 mi) and has an average width between 100 km (62 mi) and 300 km (190 mi), with a maximum width of 350 km (220 mi). The basin has two parts, the Balkhash depression in the west and the Alakol artesian basin in the east. The elevation ranges from 342 m (1,122 ft) —at the surface of lake Balkhash— to a maximum of 600 m (2,000 ft) towards the eastern end. To the northwest and north the depression is limited by the Kazakh Uplands, to the northeast by the Tarbagatai Mountains, to the west by the Zheltau, Aitau and Maizharylgan mountains, and to the south by the Dzungarian Alatau in the east and the Chu-Ili Range, part of the Tien Shan mountain system.

The main watercourse of the basin is the Ili river, flowing into Lake Balkhash from the south. Other important rivers are the Aksu, Koksu, Lepsy, Karatal, Emil, Urzhar, Tentek and Ayagöz, as well as the Tokrau and the Bakanas, which are part of the basin even though not reaching the lake. Besides the Balkhash and Alakol, other lakes of the basin are the Sasykkol, Zhalanashkol, Kashkanteniz and Itishpes, among a few smaller ones. The basin includes the Saryesik-Atyrau, Taukum and Muyunkum sandy deserts.

== Flora ==
The vegetation of the Balkhash-Alakol Depression is characteristic of the Kazakh Steppe desert and semi-desert areas. The main species that grow are salt-tolerant shrubs and grasses, such as saxaul, Calligonum, saltwort, wormwood and winterfat. Parts of the basin are used seasonally for pasture.

== See also ==
- Geology of Kazakhstan
- Outline of plate tectonics
- Panthalassa
