= Alakol Biosphere Reserve =

Biospehere reserve in the country of Kazakhstan

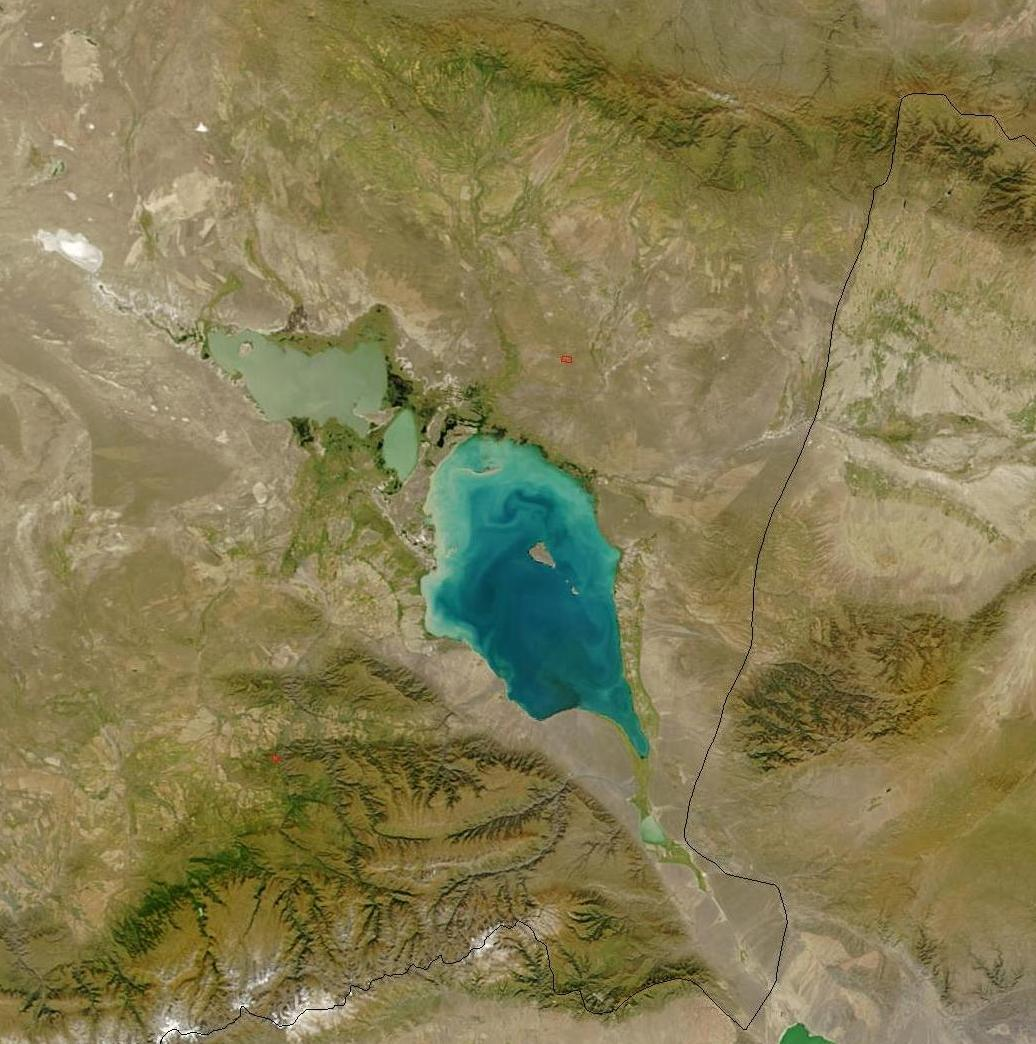
- The Alakol-Sasykkol lake system in 2003

- Location within Kazakhstan
- Location: Kazakhstan
- Coordinates: 46°10′59.880″N 81°46′0.120″E
- Area: 193,089 hectares (745.52 sq mi)
- Established: 2013

Ramsar Wetland
- Official name: Alakol-Sasykkol Lakes System
- Designated: 25 November 2009
- Reference no.: 1892

The Alakol Biosphere Reserve (established 2013) is a UNESCO Biosphere Reserve located in Kazakhstan, within the desert zone of Eurasia in the central part of the Alakol inter-mountain depression. The 193,089 hectares (745.52 sq mi) reserve lies on the Central Asian–Indian bird migration route. The wetlands of the reserve are of global significance as a habitat and as a nesting site for water birds.

The Alakol State Nature Reserve manages the area.

== Geographical location ==
The Alakol-Sasykkol system of lakes occupies a desert depression between the mountain systems of the Jungar Alatau and Tarbagatai in the South-Eastern part of Kazakhstan. In the center of the depression is a system of large lakes: Alakol, Sasykkol, Koshkarkol, Zhalanashkol. The territory of the reserve is scattered throughout the basin and is divided into 6 geographical areas: the Northern coast of the lake. Sasykkol and the Thousand lakes system; the Delta of the Tentek river; the Araltobe Islands on the lake. The Alakol lake; the Delta of the rivers Emel and Suganthi; Small Alakol Bay; East coast of oz. Zhalanashkol and the tract Kizilkian in Dzungarian gate.

Also, according to the forest Management project, the territory is divided into 12 inspection rounds, and they, in turn, are divided into blocks.

== Ecological Characteristics ==
The biosphere reserve includes the Alakol-Sasykkol lake system and is situated at the limits of the Alakol depression, delimited by Tarbagatai ridge in the north, Dzhungarian Alatau in the south, and Barlyk ridge in the east and south-east.

The biosphere reserve lies on the Central Asian–Indian bird migration route and is a wetland of global significance as a habitat and aggregation site for water birds. This territory, inscribed on the Ramsar Convention's Internationally Important Wetlands List in 2009, is the nesting habitat for 203 bird species out of the 342 registered here. More than half of these nesting species (110) are water birds, 22 of which are rare and endangered and are listed on the Red Data Books of Kazakhstan and IUCN. These include the Dalmatian Pelican (Pelecanus crispus), the Eurasian Spoonbill (Platalea leucorodia), the Greater Flamingo (Phoenicopterus roseus) and the Ferruginous Duck (Aythya nyroca), among others. In the main and buffer zones there are 269 recorded bird species, of which 110 are water birds. These are prevalent in spring and especially during autumn migrations.

The biosphere reserve contains 678 species of higher plants and 25 plant species of aquatic flora, including two plant species listed on the Red Data Book of Kazakhstan: Tulipa kolpakowskiana and Tulipa brachystemon. About 40 per cent of all floristic diversity found in the reserve is represented by economically important species. The main plant associations are represented by five main types – desert, meadow, marsh, tugai and underwater – and fragmentally by two more types – shrub and large-leaved forest.

== Socio-Economic Characteristics ==
The biosphere reserve has a population of about 33,000 people living in the transition area. The local economy is based mainly on agriculture (cereals, oilseeds), cattle breeding and, to a lesser extent, processing of agricultural production.

The principle industries of the Alakol district are large sugar and fish factories, tank farms and agro corporations.

== Sources ==
This article incorporates text from a free content work (license statement/permission). Text taken from UNESCO - MAB Biosphere Reserves Directory, UNESCO, UNESCO.
