= Trechus kaikanicus =

Scientific classification
- Domain: Eukaryota
- Kingdom: Animalia
- Phylum: Arthropoda
- Class: Insecta
- Order: Coleoptera
- Suborder: Adephaga
- Family: Carabidae
- Genus: Trechus
- Species: T. kaikanicus

Binomial name
- Trechus kaikanicus Belousov & Kabak, 1994

Species of beetle

Trechus kaikanicus is a species of ground beetle in the subfamily Trechinae. It was described by Belousov & Kabak in 1994.

== Distribution ==
Trechus kaikanicus is thought to be endemic to a small and isolated ridge situated in the north of the Dzhungarian mountain range.
