= Aksu (Lake Balkhash) =

River in Kazakhstan

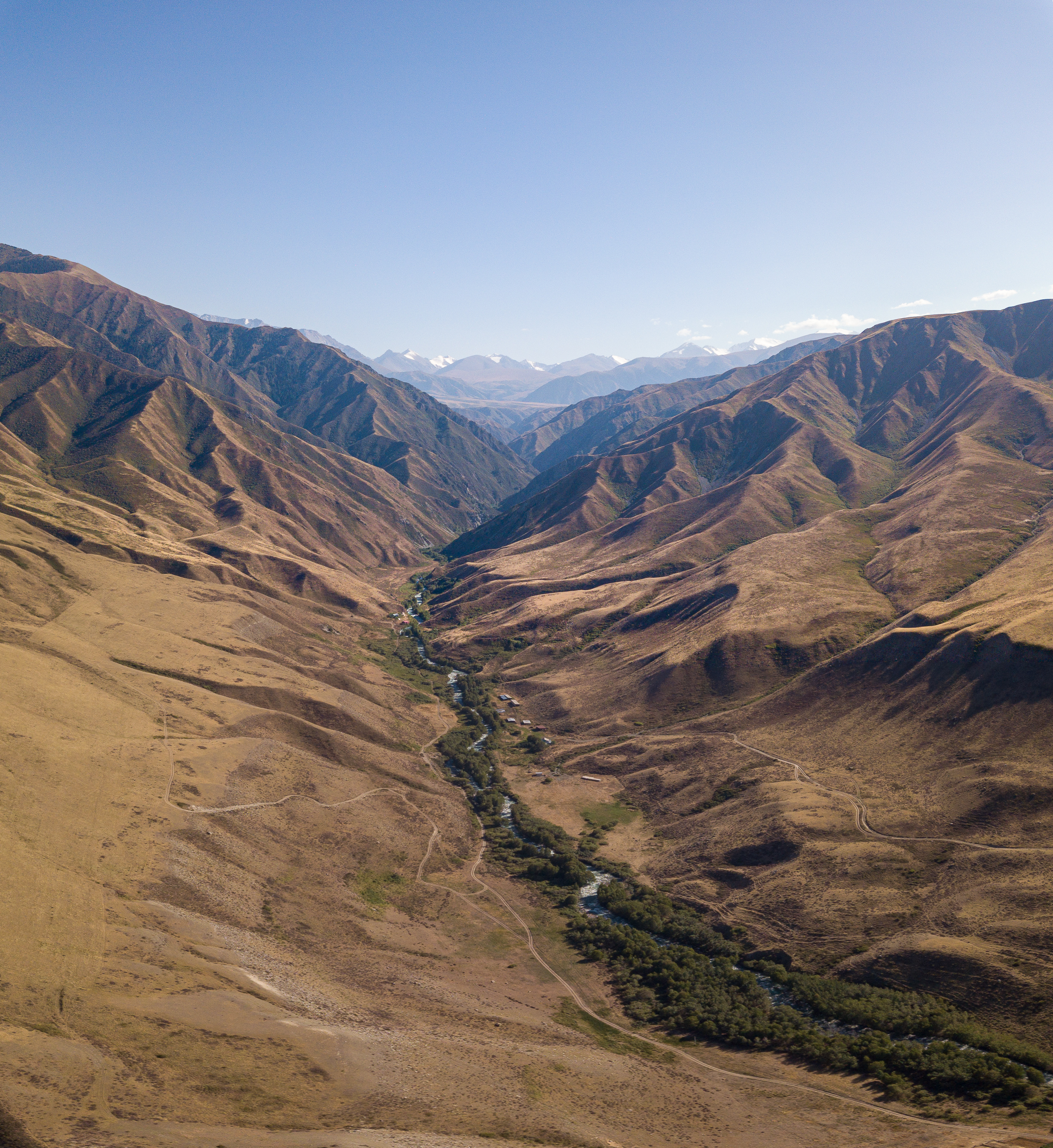

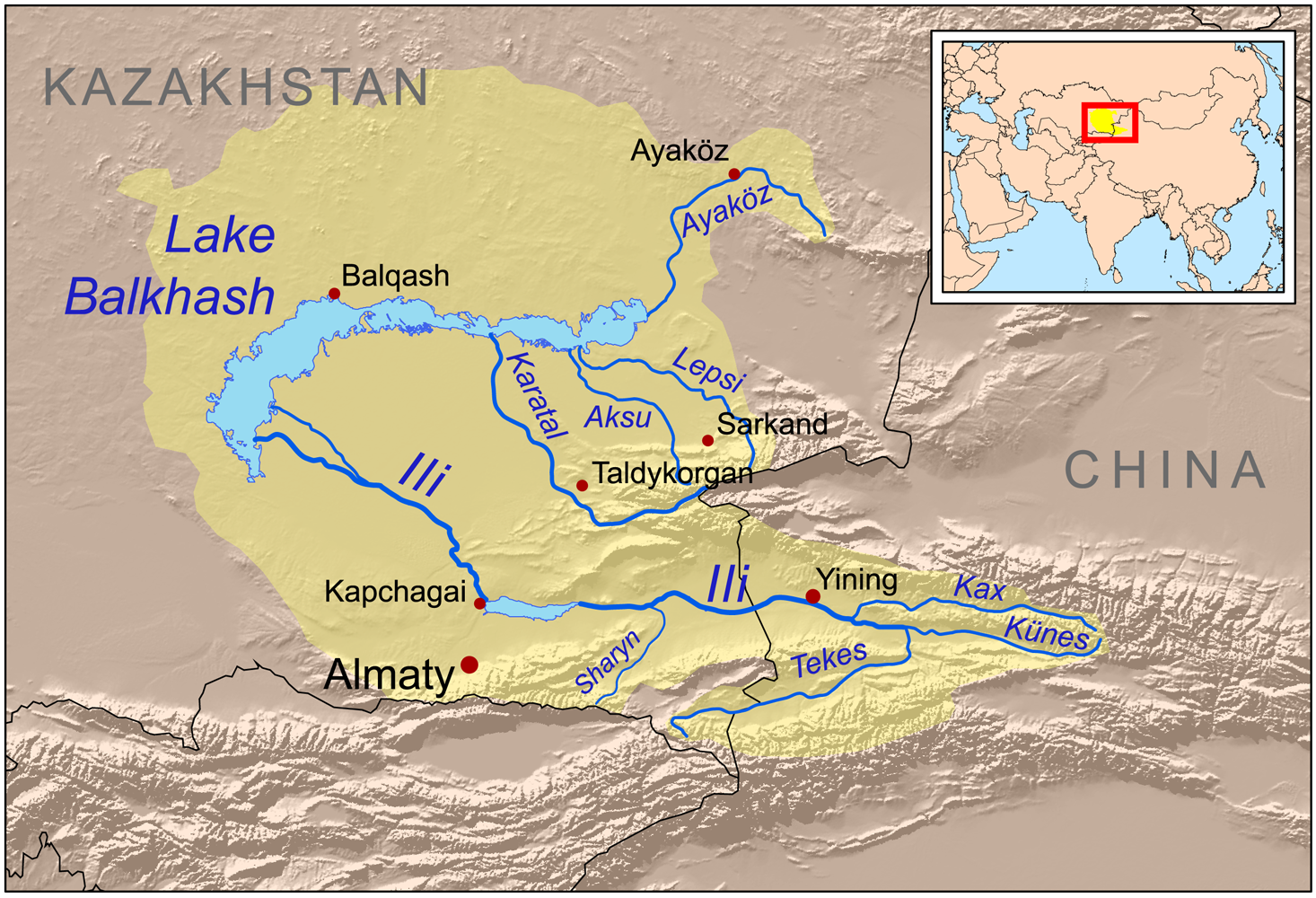
- Map of the Lake Balkhash drainage basin

Location
- Country: Kazakhstan

Physical characteristics
- Source
  - location: Dzungarian Alatau Mountains
- Mouth
  - location: Lake Balkhash
  - coordinates: 46.32342°N 78.21004°E
- Length: 316 km (196 mi)
- Basin size: 5,040 km^{2} (1,950 sq mi)

The Aksu (Kazakh: Ақсу, Aqsu; Russian: Аксу) is a river of the Balkhash-Alakol Basin, Kazakhstan. It originates in the Dzungarian Alatau Mountains near the border with China and flows into Lake Balkhash. In Turkic languages, the name 'ak+su' literally means "clean/white water". The Aksu is one of the main rivers of the historic region of Zhetysu. It is 316 kilometres (196 mi) long, and has a drainage basin of 5,040 square kilometres (1,950 sq mi).

== Course ==
The river flows north from the border with China before turning north-westward, passing by Matay and then northward when it reaches the Saryesik-Atyrau Desert, a large sand desert south of Lake Balkhash. The river empties into Lake Balkhash just west of the Lepsy River on its southern side. Aksu freezes over in December and stays icebound until March. Because of irrigation, the river's flow into Lake Balkash is limited.
