= Sagabuyen ancient settlement =

Coordinates: 45°24′54″N 79°13′58″E

Sagabuyen ancient settlement is one of the medieval cities of the so - called Northern section of the Silk Road, which ran along the spurs of the Zhetysu Alatau from the crossing to Or to Lake Alakol and the Dzungarian Gate.

== History ==
The settlement of Sagabuyen, whose ruins are located on the Northern edge of the village of the same name on the left Bank of the river Buyen (bien) at its exit from the Kyzylagash mountains to the plain, is one of the medieval cities of the so - called Northern section of the Silk Road, which ran along the spurs of the Zhetysu Alatau from the crossing to Or to the lake. Alakol and the Dzungarian gate. The city appeared in the Karakhanid era on the lands of the Karluks and existed, as it is supposed, in the XI–XIII centuries. the city was localized at the crossing of the river. Bien, as well as many other urban settlements that arose on the banks of obstinate rivers that flowed to the Northern foothills of the Alatau. Apparently, then there was this caravan route, the most convenient in the nature of the region, which later, in the late XVIII – early XIX century., became known as Zhetysu/Semirechye. In the middle of this difficult route, the bien river was one of the seven rivers that were crossed by trading caravans: Leps, Sarkand, Baskan, Aksu, Karatal and Koksu.

The site has been little studied by modern archaeologists. The discovery and beginning of the study of the monument is associated with the name of the first Semirechensk archaeologist – N. N. Pantusov (1849–1909). Even during the construction of the Kopal fortification, in the 1850s, a military engineer P. S. Nechogin discovered a Buddhist monastery somewhere on the Bank of the Karatal River, which, according to his description, the Imperial Archaeological Commission attempted to find many years later in 1888, asking for help from the Governor-General of the Steppe region G. A. Kolpakovsky. On his behalf, a young official, A. N. Teplov, who served in Kopal, was sent to search for the remains of a Buddhist temple. Since the copy of Nechogin's description of the location of the temple sent by the Archaeological Commission was not accurate, many important information that could help the search was omitted during the correspondence of the document. Teplov went to search not on the banks of the Karatal, but in the opposite direction – to the banks of the river Buyen, where he found the remains of the settlement, which he took for the wanted temple. After making measurements and drawing a plan of the settlement, Teplov submitted his report to the authorities. Following this, N. N. Pantusov was sent to excavate the "temple". He also made the first and only excavations on the site, as well as excavated several mounds to the West of the monument and discovered petroglyphs in several gorges of the Kyzylagash mountains. Having made sure that the surveyed monument is not the desired "temple", N. N. Pantusov doubted the authenticity of Nechogin's report about it. Since abandoned the search for a Buddhist temple, really discovered by S. P. Nicolini, but were found many monuments of ancient culture and medieval settlement Sagabuyen.

== Description ==
The medieval settlement of Sagabuyen is an elevated area of almost square shape, surrounded by the sagging ramparts of the fortress walls with towers around the perimeter. Its dimensions are 260 x 280 m, the height of the rampart is about 2 m. on the inner territory of the settlement, small hills and depressions are visible-traces of collapsed and swollen households, alleys, and traces of excavations. The North-Eastern corner of the fortifications was destroyed by the riverbed of the old river Buyen. On the surface of the settlement there are fragments of pottery made on a Potter's wheel; small fragments of table watering dishes are rarely found. To the West of the settlement, a large number of small hills are visible, closely located to each other; it is possible that the city cemetery of the medieval city was located here.

== Location ==
Almaty Region, Aksu district, on the Northern edge of S. Sagabuyen, on the left Bank of the river Buyin.

== Preservation of the monument ==
The monument is under state protection and is included in the State list of historical and cultural monuments of local significance of Almaty region in 2010 (No. 84). There is no physical protection of the monument in place.

== Sources of information about the monument ==
Archeology Of Semirechye. 1857-1912. Collection of documents and materials. Almaty, 2011. Dock. 158, 162, 183, 196.
