= Lepsy (river) =

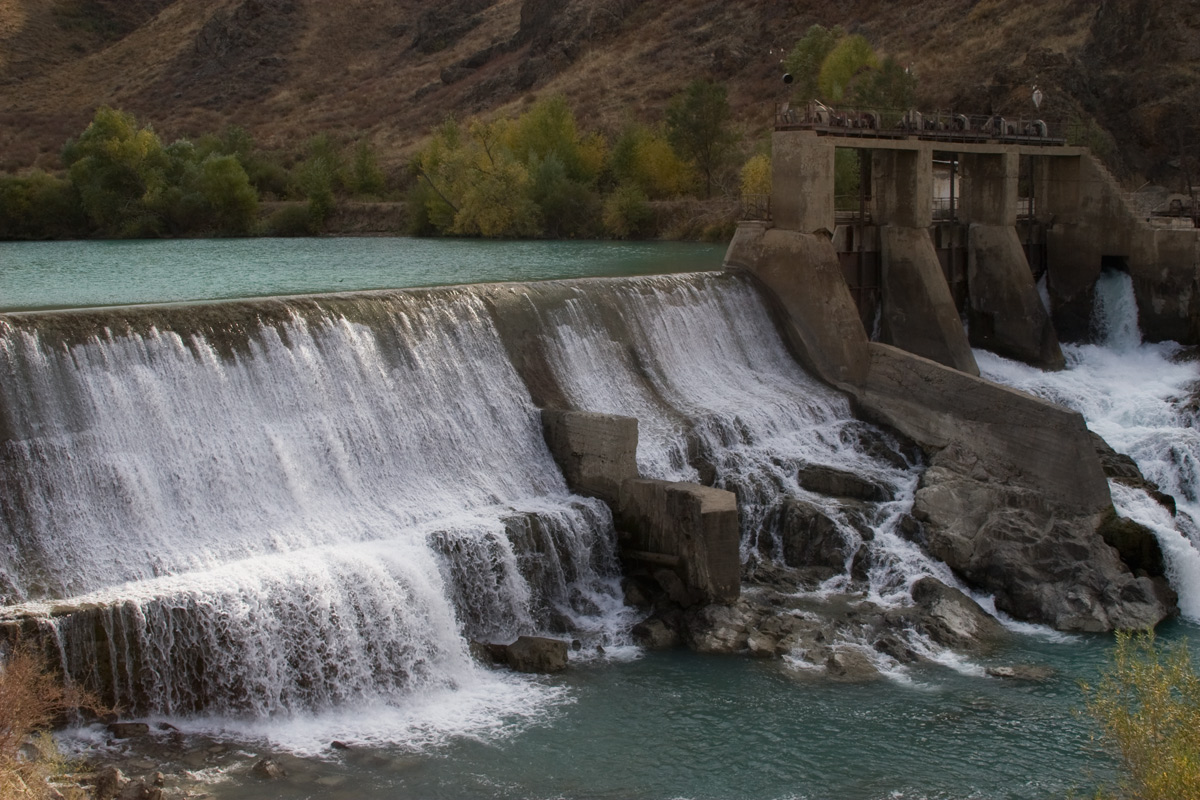
- A dam on the upper Lepsy

Location
- Country: Kazakhstan

Physical characteristics
- Source
  - location: Dzungarian Alatau Mountains
- Mouth
  - location: Lake Balkhash
  - coordinates: 46.3646°N 78.3391°E
- Length: 417 km (259 mi)
- Basin size: 8,100 km^{2} (3,100 sq mi)

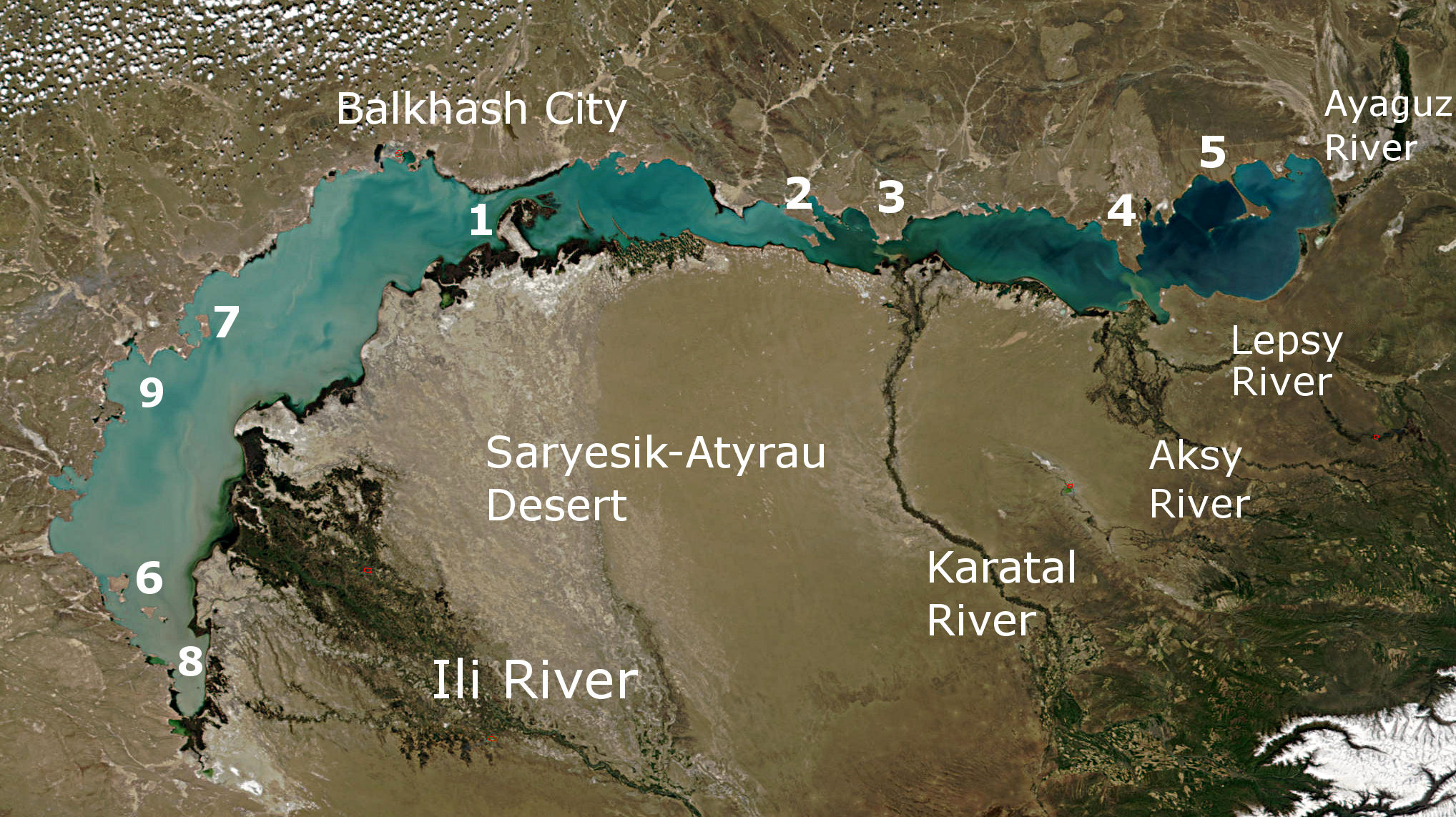
Lake Balkhash with the Lepsy River

The Lepsy (Kazakh: Лепсі, Lepsı; Russian: Лепсы) also known as the Lepsa River or the Lepsi River, is a river of the Balkhash-Alakol Basin, south-eastern Kazakhstan. It originates in the Dzungarian Alatau Mountains north of the border with China, and flows into the endorheic Lake Balkhash. The river is 417 kilometres (259 mi) long and has a basin area of 8,100 square kilometres (3,100 sq mi). The Lepsy is the easternmost of the two small rivers that flow into the eastern Balkhash on the south bank, the other being the Aksu. The Lepsy is one of the main rivers of the historic region of Zhetysu.

== Course ==
The river flows north from the border with China before turning north-westward north of Sarkand and then west before turning north northward when it reaches the Saryesik-Atyrau Desert, a large sand desert south of Lake Balkhash. The river empties into Lake Balkhash just east of the Aksu River on its southern side. Lepsy freezes over in December and stays icebound until March. Because of the amount of water taken for irrigation, the river's flow into Lake Balkash is limited.

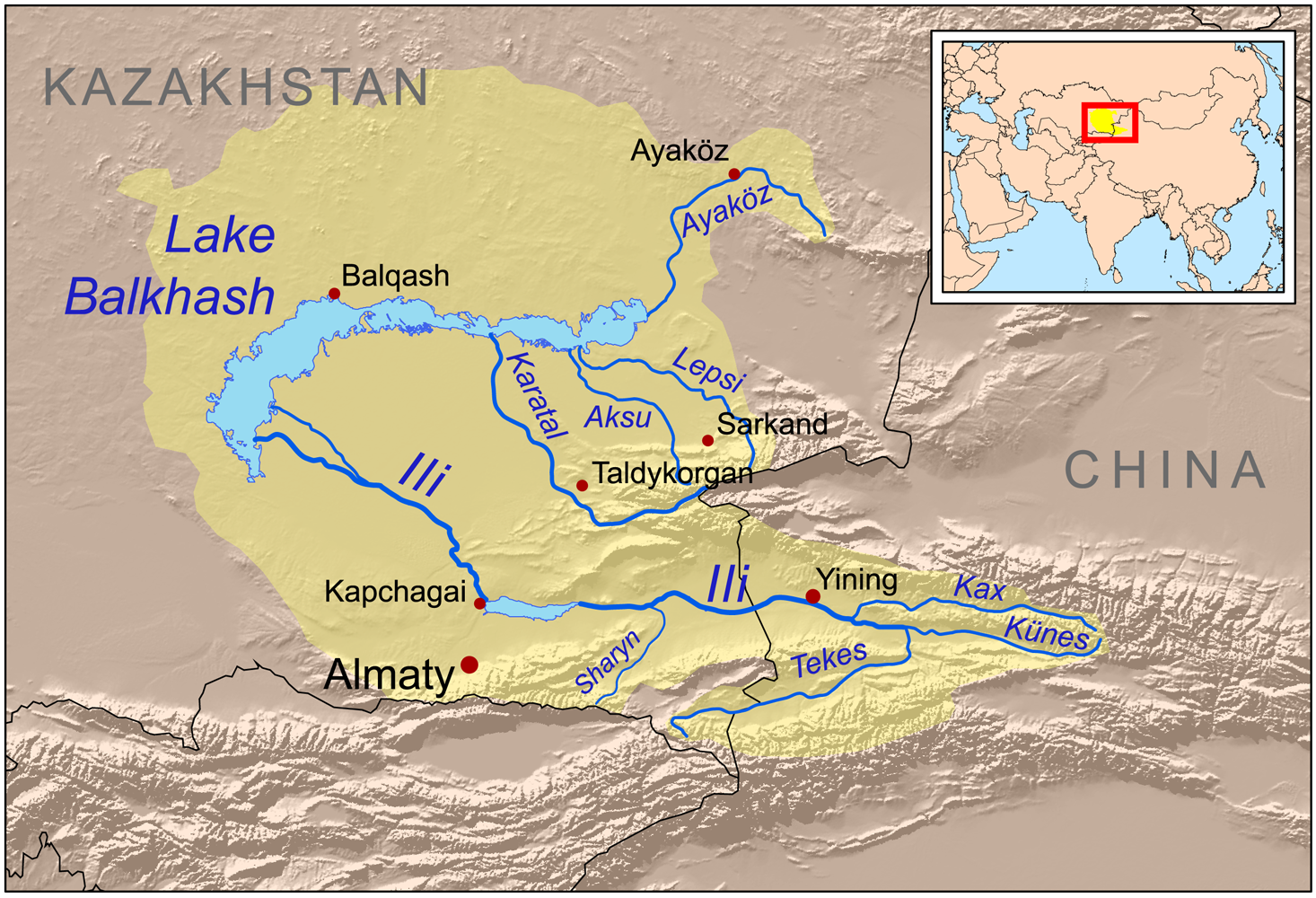
Map of the Lake Balkhash drainage basin
