= Islands of Lake Balkhash =

Lake Balkhash in Kazakhstan was formed due to uneven subsidence of the Turan plate and flooding of the formed depressions presumably in the second period of the Cenozoic era. Elevated areas of the plate formed many small and several large Islands.

In total, there are 43 Islands on lake Balkhash, covering 66 square km. The Islands of Basaral, Tasaral, Ortaaral, Ozinaral, and Algazi are the most important and largest of the Balkhash Islands. There are few Islands in the salty part of Balkhash. Therefore, the current name of the lake comes from the word "Balkh" of the Tatar, Kazakh and South Altaic languages, which means "hummocks in the swamp".

== Description ==
The island of Algazy is one of the largest and is located in the middle part of Lake Balkhash, stretched from North-West to South-East for 7 kilometers, width from 1 to 3 kilometers, area of about 13 kilometers square. To the North of the island is the Baigabyl Peninsula. The island is separated from the North shore by a Strait 1.5 kilometers wide, and from the South by a Strait about 4 kilometers wide. The coast is flat, the North-Western part is most elevated, the absolute height is 366 meters above sea level. It is composed of Devonian sandstones with tuff layers.

The land surface near the lake is covered with sparse sagebrush-Solyanka vegetation on brown gravelly soils. Between the long Baigabyl Peninsula and the wide Balay Peninsula, the lake is deeply cut by the narrow Bay of Balyktykol, which means "fish". In the middle of the very beginning of the Bay, small Islands stretch one after another — a real archipelago. At the exit of the Bay, almost opposite the village of Karakum, where the fish factory "Algazinsky" is located, is the last island of the archipelago. The locals call it "Shaitanka" which is Devil's island. All the other Islands combined under the name Abdikarim. The first tiny island, like a large granite monument, is covered with green reeds on one side. It was a favorite resting place for cormorants. They left a lot of "business cards"on the light granite. The second island looks like a rounded and green hill. It is overgrown with saltpeter and teresken. These two types of shrubs predominate only in these places. On one side of the island is an area of green reeds. The island with a diameter of about seventy meters is densely populated with birds: jackdaws, grey herons, silver gulls, Kestrels. All this feathered society is tolerant of each other.

One of the Islands of the archipelago is located opposite the tiny and semi-abandoned village of Sarykamys. It is very picturesque, strongly indented, it has two large lakes connected by a narrow channel with Balkhash, several wonderful beaches. Lonely mounds crown the highest parts of the island, and on a small plain near the shore is a circle, about ten meters in diameter, laid out of large stones, half-buried in the soil.

The ancient mounds are all made of large rubble brought from the shore. Near each were groups of stones. Time has changed their location, but sometimes they have kept the shape of a regular circle or rectangle. Near one of them, a stone circle was made up of large, upright stones. All this resembled Saka burial sites.

== Climate ==
The climate of the area where the lake is located is of the desert type. Precipitation is extremely low: the average monthly figure is no more than 11–12 mm.the wettest month is may, during which up to 16 mm of precipitation falls. On average, no more than 111 mm per year. The warmest month of the year is July, the air warms up to +30 °C. Winter is quite mild, the temperature minimum is recorded annually in January: no more than -14 °C.

== Tourism ==
The lake has recreational potential. Various sporting events have been held for several years as part of the movement to preserve the lake's diverse landscapes. Tourist infrastructure of the lake is almost not developed.

== Location and attendance ==
Lake Balkhash is located in the South-East of Kazakhstan in 3 regions of the country: Karaganda, Almaty and Zhambyl regions. In the North of the lake begins the border of the Kazakh melkosopochnik, in the West – the Betpak-Dala desert, in the South-the Chu-ili ridge, the Taukum and saryesik-Atyrau Sands. The territory of the lake has a favorable acoustic environment (silence, melodic sounds in nature). The number of tourists for a single visit to the natural monument is not limited. The best time to travel is from April to October.

== Sources ==
- Marikovsky P. I. Around the blue lake : (a Story about lake Balkhash). - Almaty, 2000. - 295 p.
- Marikovsky P. I. Forgotten Islands (Oz. Balkhash). - M.: Thought, 1991. - 238 p. - ISBN 5-244-00563-4.
- Samakova, A. B. Problems of hydro-ecological resilience in the basin of lake Balkhash. - Almaty: Khaganat, 2003. - 583 p.
- Romanova S. M., Kazangapova, N. B. Lake Balkhash is a unique hydroecological system. - Almaty:, 2003. - 175 p.
