= Korzhin Island =

Uninhabited island in Lake Balkhash, Kazakhstan

- Island
- Location within Kazakhstan
- Coordinates: 46°35′N 75°55′E
- Country: Kazakhstan
- Body of water: Lake Balkhash
- Province: Almaty Province

Korzhin Island (also known as Kurzhin, Kurdzhyn, Korzhun, Kurzhon or Kurdzhun Island) is a long and flat island in Lake Balkhash in Kazakhstan. It is located in the central portion of the lake.

== Geography ==
Korzhin is a desert island having a length of 13.5 km (8.4 mi) and a maximum width of 0.8 km (0.50 mi).

Administratively Korzhin Island belongs to the Almaty Province of Kazakhstan.
