= Jamie Maddison =

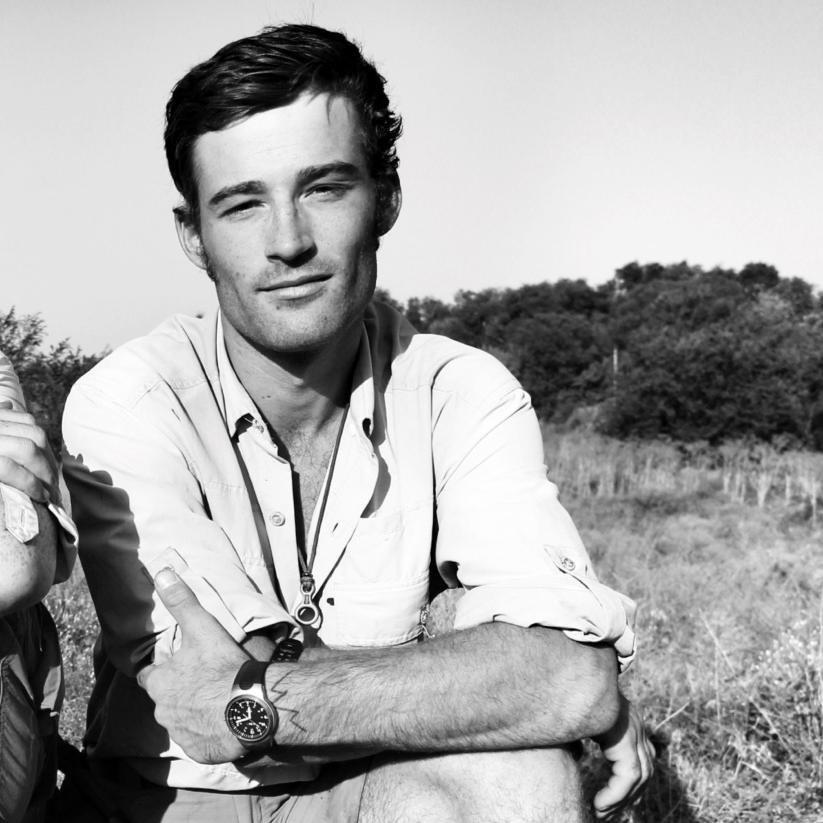
- Born: James B Maddison; July 9, 1988 (age 37); Lancaster, England
- Occupation: Explorer
- Website: www.jamiemaddison.com

James Benjamin Maddison (born 9 July 1988), formerly known as Jamie Bunchuk, is an English explorer, equestrian Long Rider (assoc.) and an editor of Sidetracked magazine. He is best known for his exploration of the Central Asia region. Maddison's first expedition was to the Djangart Valley of the Tian Shan mountains in eastern Kyrgyzstan. Since then, he has mounted numerous expeditions including: spending one month living and working with Kirghiz hunters in southeast Tajikistan, small archaeological discoveries from the X-XI C. Sak city of Bazar Dara, a 100 mile, multi-day, camel supported run across the Red Sands Desert in Uzbekistan, chronicling the lives of Kazakh eagle hunters in western Mongolia and winter packrafting down the Khovd River, Mongolia (temperatures down to -20 °C) in retrofitted and homemade packrafts.

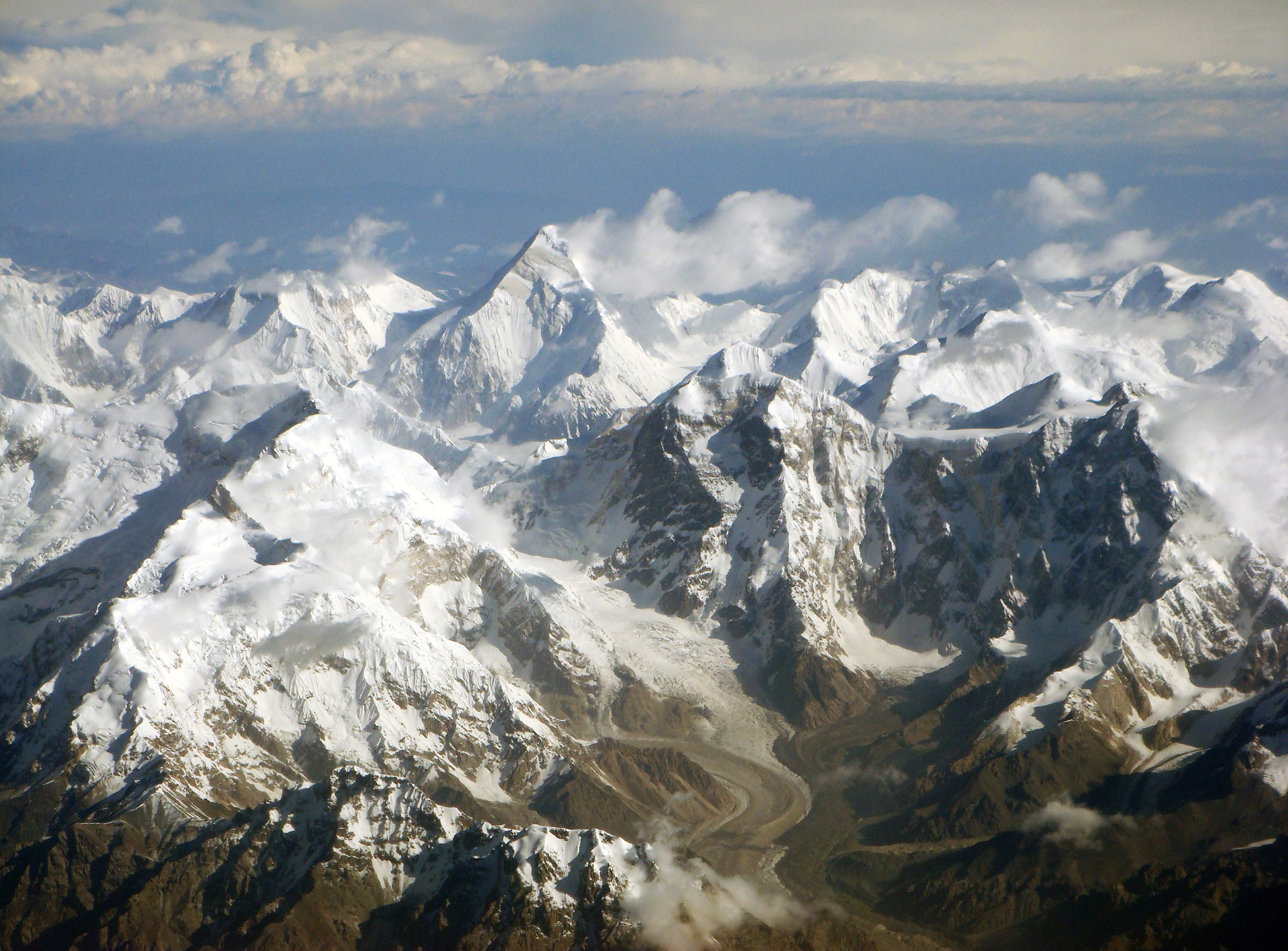
The Tian Shan range on the border between China and Kyrgyzstan

In 2013, Maddison – alongside friend and colleague Matthew Traver – completed a 750 mile, 63-day-long, horse ride from Ust-Kamenogorsk to Almaty, in honour of the centenary of a historical journey through the region by the Anglo-Irish explorer Sir Charles Howard-Bury. For their efforts, the pair were presented with an award for the 'Best individual contribution for furthering relations between the UK and Kazakhstan' by the British-Kazakh Society at the House of Commons. For the expedition, he was also the recipient of a Sir Peter Holmes Memorial Award from the Royal Society for Asian Affairs. This award is designed to encourage independent and purposeful travel in Asia.

In the autumn of 2014, Maddison led the first expedition ever to cross the Betpak-Dala or the 'Steppe of Misfortune' from its easternmost extremity on the shores of Lake Balkash to its western edge on the Sarysu River. He also ran 190 miles, nearly eight marathons, back to back over the course of eight days within the region. The expedition was aided by two locals, a supporting four-wheel-drive vehicle, and with funding from the French underwear company HOM.

In September 2017, Maddison made the first on-foot crossing of the Saryesik-Atyrau Desert, running 70 miles across the lower reaches of the region from the Ili River to the Karatal River in under 30 hours. Across that time he had to contend with 36 °C heat and soft sand dunes underfoot. The expedition was sponsored by watchmaker Christopher Ward.

Maddison was a journalist, having written investigative articles on deforestation within Armenia (published in Geographical magazine) and reporting on the further environmental damage of Lake Sevan's changing water levels (published in Hidden Europe magazine). Previously an editor of Sidetracked magazine and presenter for Sidetracked TV, he is now a content marketing strategist in London and a motivational speaker.

Maddison married on December 15, 2018.
