= Lake Balkhash =

Lake in southeastern Kazakhstan

- Балқаш көлі, Balqaş kölı Озеро Балхаш
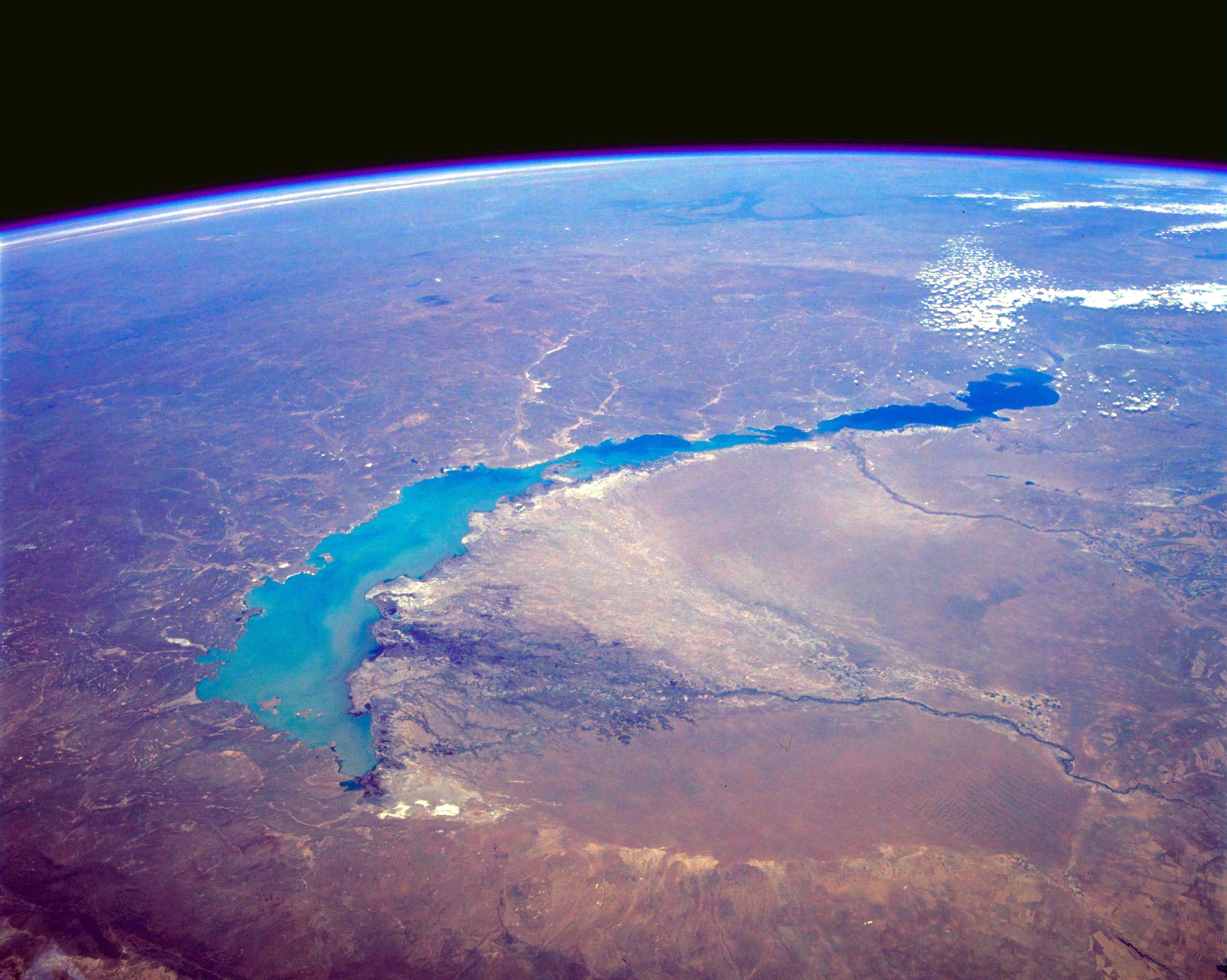
- View from space, April 1991

- Location within Kazakhstan

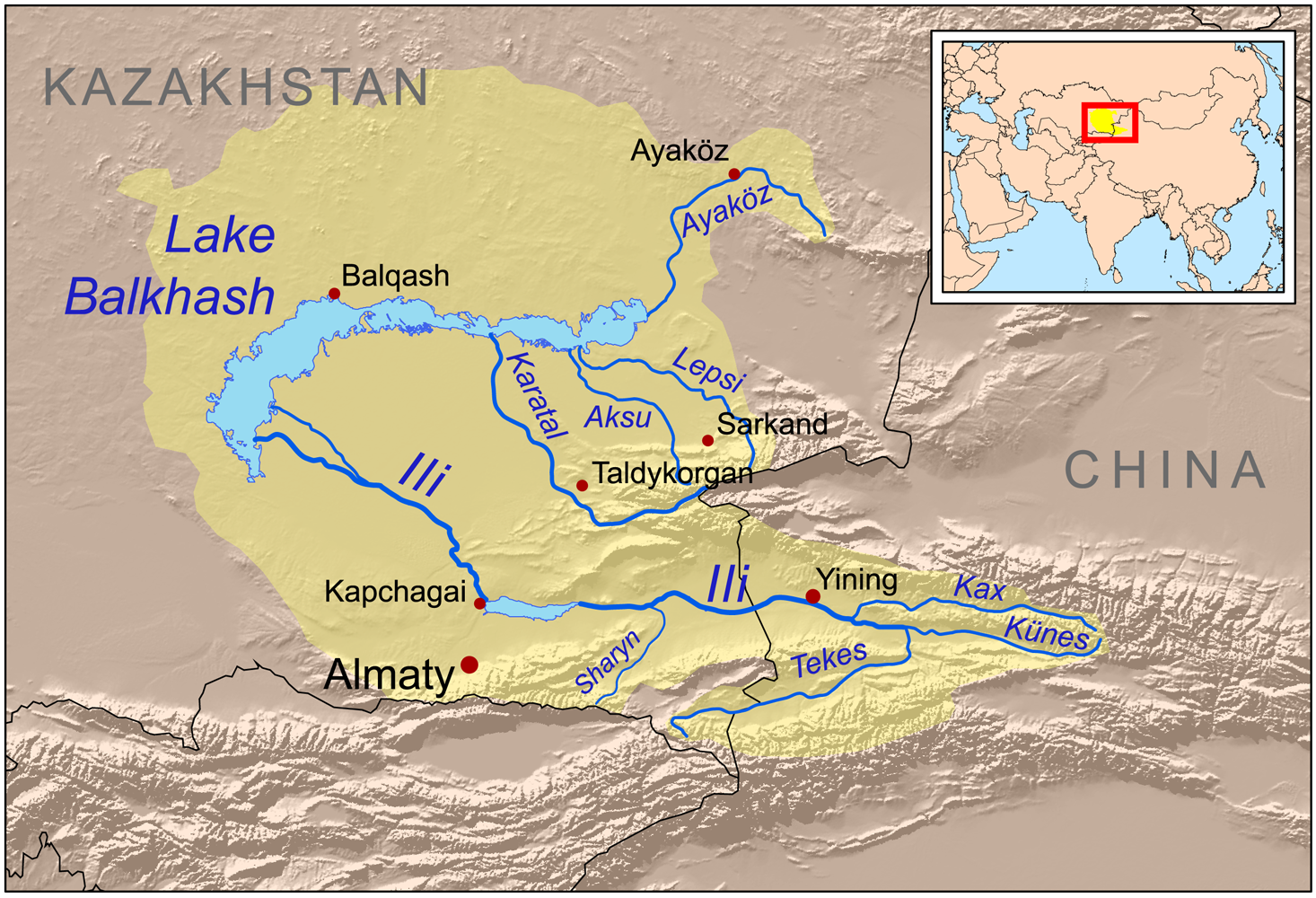
- Map of the Lake Balkhash drainage basin
- Location: Kazakhstan
- Coordinates: 46°10′N 74°20′E
- Type: Endorheic, Saline
- Primary inflows: Ili, Karatal, Aksu, Lepsy, Byan, Kapal, Koksu rivers
- Primary outflows: evaporation
- Basin countries: Kazakhstan
- Max. length: 605 km (376 mi)
- Max. width: East 19 km (12 mi); West 74 km (46 mi)
- Surface area: 16,400 km^{2} (6,300 sq mi)
- Average depth: 5.8 m (19 ft)
- Max. depth: 26 m (85 ft)
- Water volume: 100 km^{3} (24 cu mi)
- Surface elevation: 341.4 m (1,120 ft)
- Frozen: November to March

Lake Balkhash, (Note: Russian: озеро Балхаш, romanized: ozero Balhaš, pronounced [ˈozʲɪrə bɐlˈxaʂ]) also known as Lake Balqash, (Note: Kazakh: Балқаш көлі, romanized: Balqaş kölı, pronounced [b̥ɑɫqʰɑ́ʃ kʰɵlʉ́]) is a lake in southeastern Kazakhstan. It is one of the largest lakes in Asia and the 15th largest in the world. It is located in the eastern part of Central Asia and sits in the Balkhash-Alakol Basin, an endorheic (closed) basin. The basin drains seven rivers, the primary of which is the Ili, bringing most of the riparian inflow; others, such as the Karatal, bring surface and subsurface flow. The Ili is fed by precipitation, largely vernal snowmelt, from the mountains of China's Xinjiang region.

The lake currently covers about 16,400 km^{2} (6,300 sq mi). However, like the Aral Sea, it is shrinking due to diversion and extraction of water from its feeders. The lake has a narrow, quite central, strait. The lake's western part is fresh water and its eastern half is saline. The eastern part is on average 1.7 times deeper than the west. The largest shore city is named Balkhash and has about 66,000 inhabitants. Main local economic activities include mining, ore processing and fishing.

There is concern about the lake's shallowing due to desertification of microclimates and water extraction for multiplied industrial output.

== History and naming ==
The present name of the lake originates from the word "balkas" of Tatar, Kazakh and Southern Altai languages which means "tussocks in a swamp".

From as early as 103 BC up until the 8th century, the Balkhash polity surrounding the lake, whose Chinese name was Yibohai 夷播海, was known to the Chinese as 布谷/布庫/布蘇 "Bugu/Buku/Busu." From the 8th century on, the land to the south of the lake, between it and the Tian Shan mountains, was known in Turkic as Jetisu "Seven Rivers" (Semirechye in Russian). It was a land where the nomadic Turks and Mongols of the steppe mingled cultures with the settled peoples of Central Asia.

Beginning in 1759, the lake marked the northwesternmost limit of Qing suzerainty as recognized by the Qing and Russians. In 1864, the lake and its neighboring area were ceded to the Russian Empire under the Treaty of Tarbagatai. With the dissolution of the Soviet Union in 1991, the lake became part of Kazakhstan.

== Origin of the lake ==
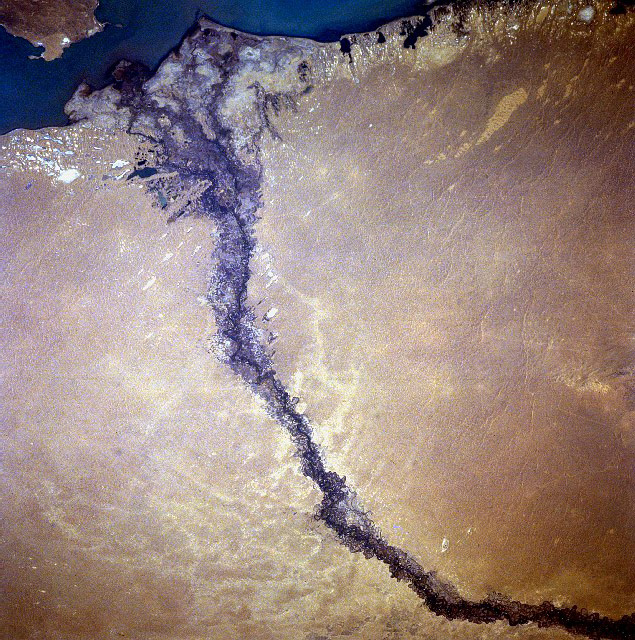
Satellite image of the Karatal River delta

Balkhash lies in the deepest part of the vast Balkhash-Alakol depression, which was formed by a sloping trough between mountains of the Alpine orogeny and the older Kazakhstan Block during the Neogene and Quaternary. Rapid erosion of the Tian Shan has meant the depression subsequently filled with sand river sediments in what is geologically a very short timespan. The basin is a part of Dzungarian Alatau, which also contains lakes Sasykkol, Alakol, and Aibi. These lakes are remnants of an ancient sea which once covered the entire Balkhash-Alakol depression, but was not connected with the Aral–Caspian Depression.

== Description ==
All the rivers of this region that carry their waters from high mountains flow into Lake Balkhash, however, none of them flows out. The major ones are: Ili, Aksu and Karatal. River Tokrau flows from the north, but its waters get lost in the sands before reaching the lakeshore. The lake is divided into two parts by the Saryesik peninsula (which means "Yellow Door" in the Kazakh language). These two parts are connected by the Uzynaral strait. In ancient times Balkhash was much larger and many lakes in the area were part of it, such as Zhalanashkol, Itishpes, Alakol and Sasykkol. Even farther back it was a sea, stretching all the way to the Dzungarian Alatau.

As recently as 1910 the lake was considerably larger with an estimated area of 23,464 km^{2}. By 1946 this had shrunk by a nearly third, to 15,730 km^{2}.

== Relief ==
The lake has a surface area of about 16,400 km^{2} (2000), making it the largest lake wholly in Kazakhstan. Its surface is about 340 m above sea level. It has a gentle curve (sickle) shape yet with jagged shorelines. Its length is about 600 km and the width varies from 9–19 km in the eastern part to 74 km in the western part. Saryesik Peninsula, near the middle of the lake, hydrographically divides it into two very different lakes. The western lake covers 58% of the surface area but only 46% of the volume. It is thus relatively shallow, quiet and filled with freshwater. The eastern lake is much deeper and saltier. These parts are connected by the Uzynaral Strait (Kazakh: Ұзынарал – "long island") – 3.5 km wide and about 6 metres deep.

View of Lake Balkhash from Space (August 2002)
The numbers mark the largest peninsulas, island and bays: 1. Saryesik peninsula, separating the lake into two parts, and Uzynaral Strait; 2. Baygabyl Peninsula; 3. Balai Peninsula; 4. Shaukar Peninsula; 5. Kentubek Peninsula; 6. Basaral and Ortaaral Islands; 7. Tasaral Island; 8. Shempek Bay; 9. Saryshagan Bay

The lake includes several small basins. In the western part, are two depressions 7–11 meters deep. One extends from the western coast (near Tasaral Island) to Cape Korzhyntubek, whereas the second lies south from the Gulf Bertys, which is the deepest part of the "half". The average depth of the eastern basin is 16 m and the maximum depth is 26 m.

The average depth of the lake is 5.8 metres, and the total volume of water is about 112 km^{3}.

The western and northern shores of the lake are high (20–30 m) and rocky; they are composed of such Paleozoic rocks as porphyry, tuff, granite, schist and limestone and keep traces of ancient terraces. The southern shores near the Gulf Karashagan and Ili River are low (1–2 m) and sandy. They are often flooded and therefore contain numerous water pools. Occasional hills are present with the height of 5–10 m. The coastline is very curvy and dissected by numerous bays and coves. The large bays of the western part are: Saryshagan, Kashkanteniz, Karakamys, Shempek (the southern pole of the lake), and Balakashkan Ahmetsu, and those in the eastern part are: Guzkol, Balyktykol, Kukuna, Karashigan. The eastern part also includes peninsulas Baygabyl, Balay, Shaukar, Kentubek and Korzhintobe.

The lake contains 43 islands with a total area of 66 km^{2}; however, new islands are being formed due to the lowering of water level, and the area of the existing ones is increasing. The islands of the western part include Tasaral and Basaral (the largest), as well as Ortaaral, Ayakaral and Olzhabekaral. The eastern islands include Ozynaral, Ultarakty, Korzhyn and Algazy.

== Feeding the lake and the water level ==
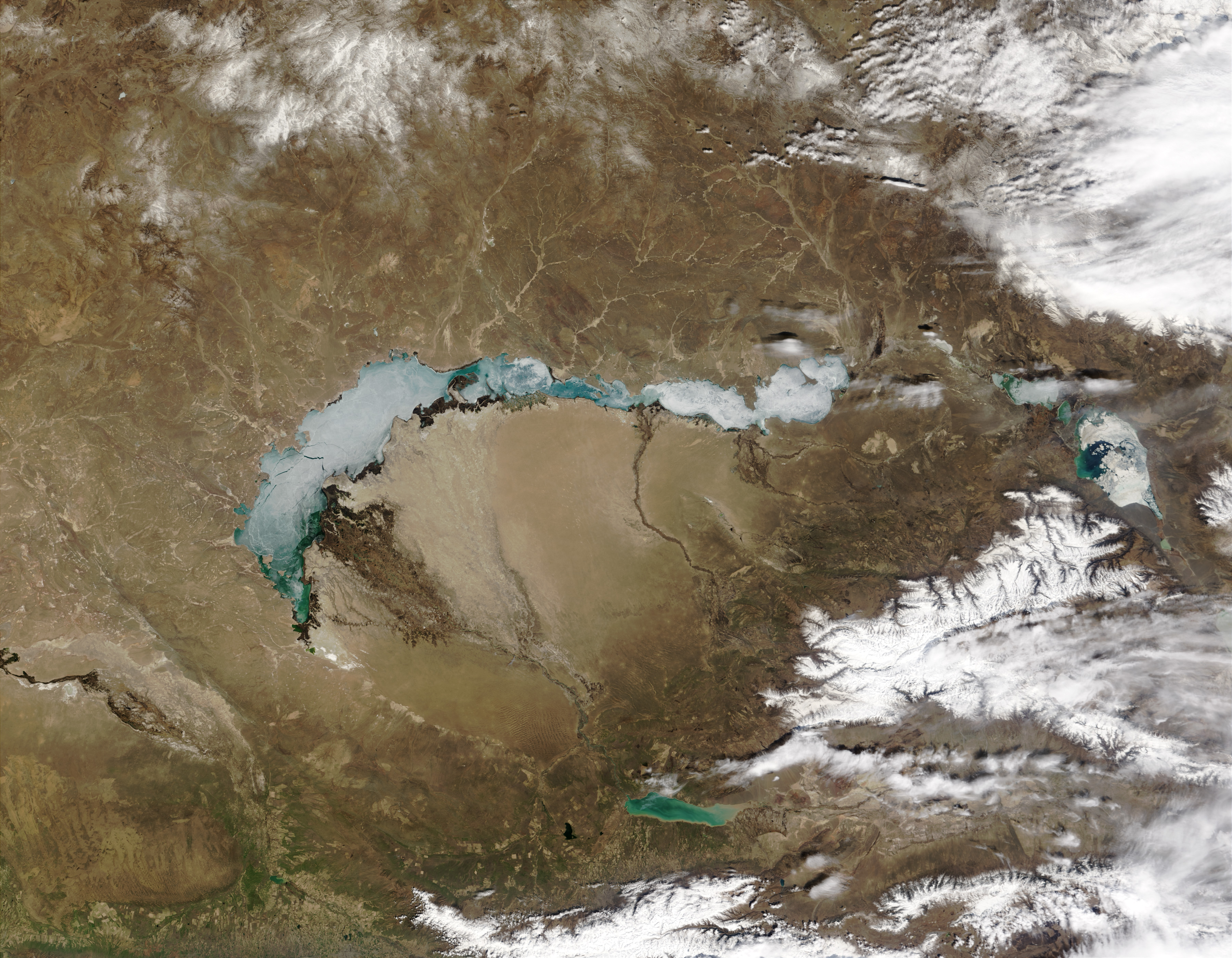
Ice over Lake Balkhash on April 11, 2003.

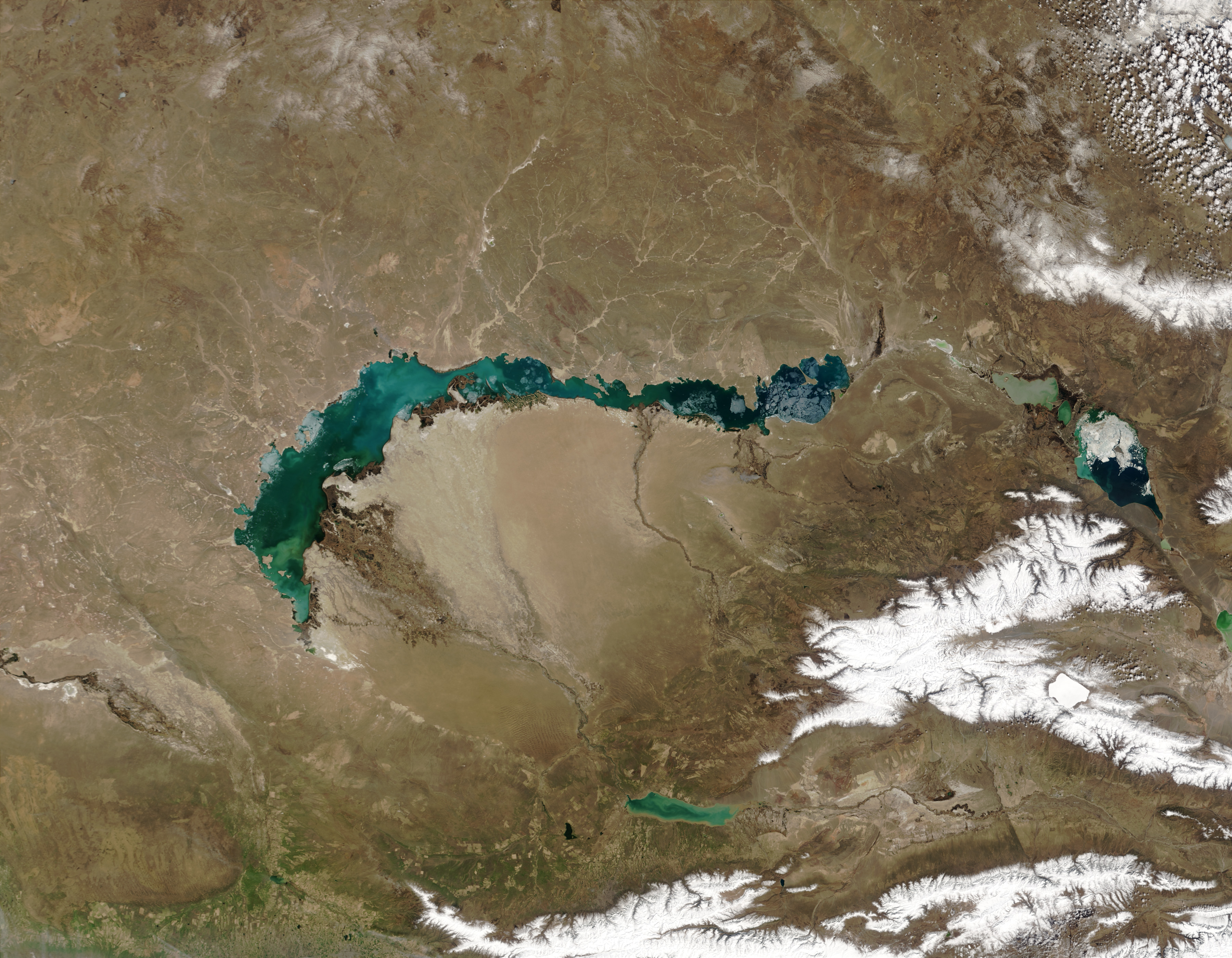
By April 18, 2003 most ice has melted.

Rapid ice melt on Lake Balkhash in April 2003.

The Balkhash-Alakol Basin covers 512,000 km^{2}, and its average surface water runoff is 27.76 km^{3}/year, of which 11.5 km^{3} comes from China. The drainage basin of the lake is about 413,000 km^{2}; with 15% in the north-west of Xinjiang in China and a negligible part from mountains along the Kyrgyz-Kazakh border. Lake Balkhash thus takes 86% of water inflow from Balkhash-Alakol basin.

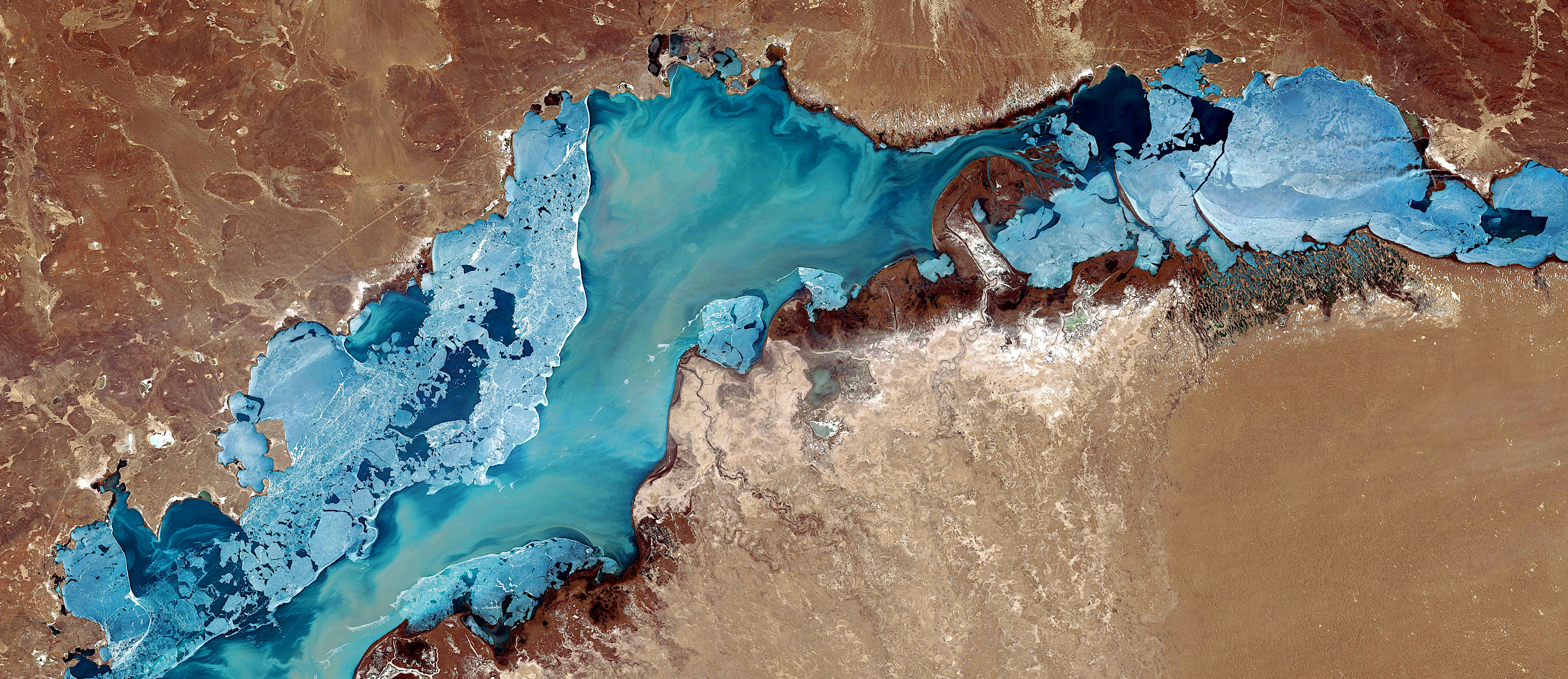
Lake Balkhash in April 2023; Winter ice melting causes the turquoise color.

The Ili accounts for 73–80% of the inflow: 12.3 km^{3}/year or 23 km^{3} per year. The river rises in a very long, narrow, high sided valley lined by the Tian Shan mountains and is mainly fed by glacier. These have a sporadic degree of relief precipitation, their predominant type. Inflow is often greatest and most regulated during the glacial melting season: June to July. The river forms a quite narrow delta of 8,000 km^{2} that serves as an multi-year accumulator type of regulator.

The eastern part of the lake is fed by the rivers Karatal, Aksu and Lepsy, as well as by groundwater. The Karatal rises on the slopes of Dzungarian Alatau and is the second-largest inflow. The Ayaguz, which fed the east half until 1950, seldom reaches Lake Balkhash.

The western half's inflow averages 1.15 km^{3} greater, per year.

The area and volume vary due to long-term and short-term fluctuations in water level. Long-term fluctuations had an amplitude of 12–14 metres. Since the year 0 CE they saw minimal water between the 5th and 10th centuries; and maximal between the 13th and 18th centuries. In the early 20th century and between 1958 and 1969, the lake swelled to cover about 18,000 km^{2}. In droughts such as the late 1900s, 1930s and 1940s, the lake shrank to about 16,000 km^{2} having a drop in level of about 3 metres. In 1946, the lake's surface area was 15,730 km^{2} (volume 82.7 km^{3)}. Since the late 1900s, the lake has been shrinking due to the diversion of the rivers supplying it. For example, Kapshagay Hydroelectric Power Plant was built on the Ili in 1970. Filling the associated Kapshagay Reservoir disbalanced the lake, worsening water quality, especially in the eastern part. Between 1970 and 1987, the water level fell by 2.2 metres, the volume reduced by 30 km^{3} and salinity in the west half was increasing. Projects were proposed to slow down the changes, such as by splitting the lake in two with a dam, called off as the Soviet Union saw recession, democratisation and secession.

Water balance of the lake in 2000
Total inflow to the lake was 22.51 km^{3}, including:
- Surface water – 18.51 km^{3},
- Underground water – 0.9 km^{3},
- Sediments and ice – 3.1 km^{3}.

Total losses amounted to 24.58 km^{3}, including

- Evaporation – 16.13 km^{3},
- Ili delta – 4.22 km^{3},
- Ice formation – 0.749 km^{3},
- Housing and communal services – 0.24 km^{3},
- Industry – 0.22 km^{3},
- Agriculture – 3.24 km^{3},
- Fisheries – 0.027 km^{3}.

The minimal water level of recent decades (340.65 meters AOD) was in 1987, when the filling of Kapshagay Reservoir was completed. The level recovered to 342.5 m by January 2005, attributed to exceptional precipitation in the late 1990s.

=== Water composition ===
Balkhash is a semi-saline lake. Chemical composition strongly depends on the hydrographic features of the reservoir. Water in the west half is nearly fresh, with the content of total dissolved solids about 0.74 g/L, and cloudy (visibility: 1 metre); it is used for drinking and industry. The east half has less silt in suspension (visibility: 5.5 metres) but resembles oceanic sea water in salinity, with concentration of 3.5–6 g/L. The average salinity of the lake is 2.94 g/L. Long-term (1931–70) average precipitation of salts in the lake is 7.53 million tonnes and the reserves of dissolved salts are about 312 million tonnes. The water in the western part has a yellow-gray tint, and in the eastern part the color varies from bluish to emerald-blue.

== Climate ==
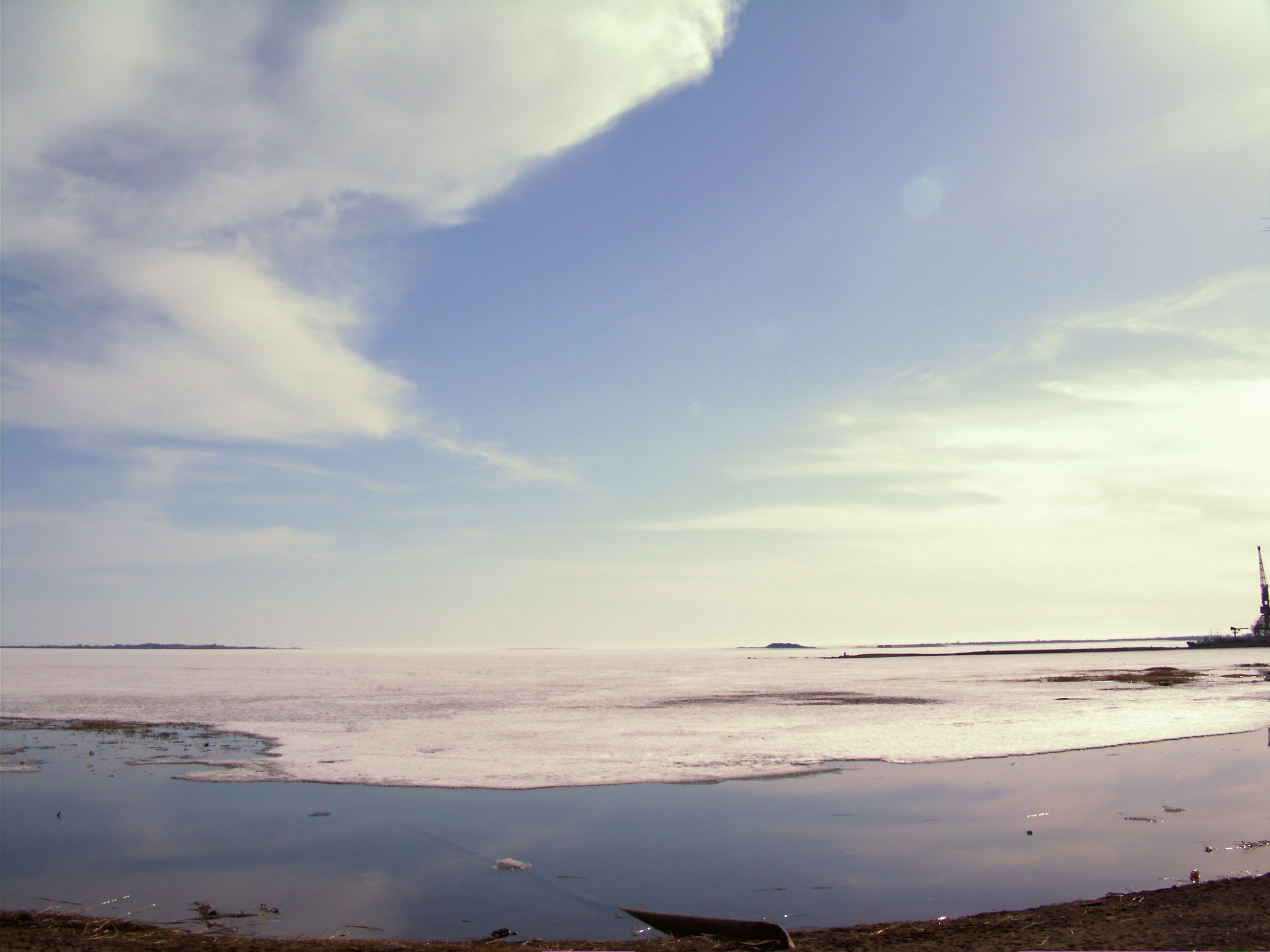
Lake Balkhash in the spring, 2008

The climate of the lake area is continental. The average mean temperature is about 24 °C with 30 °C (86 °F) highs in July and the average mean temperature is −14 °C in January. Average precipitation is 131 mm per year and the relative humidity is about 60%. Wind, dry climate and high summer temperatures result in high evaporation rate – 950 mm in cold and up to 1200 mm in dry years. Wind has average speed of 4.5–4.8 m/s and blows mainly southward in the western part and to the south-west in the eastern part. The wind induces waves up to 2–3.5 m in height and steady clockwise currents in the western part.

There are 110–130 sunny days per year with the average irradiance of 15.9 MJ/m^{2} per day. Water temperature at the surface of the lake varies from 0 °C in December to 28 °C in July. The average annual temperature is 10 °C in the western and 9 °C in the eastern parts of the lake. The lake freezes every year between November and early April, and the melting is delayed by some 10–15 days in the eastern part.

Balkhash City

Climate chart (precipitation, max. and min. temperature)
J	F	M	A	M	J	J	A	S	O	N	D
13 −9 −18	10 −8 −18	10 0 −10	11 14 3	15 22 10	12 28 16	10 30 18	8 28 16	4 22 9	9 13 2	14 3 −6	15 −5 −13
- █ Average max. and min. temperatures in °C
- █ Precipitation totals in mm
Imperial conversion
J	F	M	A	M	J	J	A	S	O	N	D
0.5 15 −1	0.4 17 0	0.4 32 14	0.4 58 37	0.6 72 50	0.5 82 61	0.4 86 65	0.3 82 60	0.2 71 49	0.4 55 35	0.6 37 21	0.6 23 8
- █ Average max. and min. temperatures in °F
- █ Precipitation totals in inches

Water temperature (°C) (data from 1985 to 1987)
Depth	Jan	Feb	Mar	Apr	May	June	July	Aug	Sep	Oct	Nov	Dec
Eastern part of the lake
0	–	−0.2	0.2	–	13.9	19.0	23.4	23.2	17.2	11.4	–	–
10	–	1	–	–	10.8	16.7	21.7	22.8	–	–	–	–
20 (near the bottom)	–	1.7	1.9	–	8.9	13.7	14.6	19.7	17.1	11.5	–	–
Western part of the lake, near Balkhash City
0	–	0.0	0.8	6.7	13.3	20.5	24.7	22.7	16.6	7.8	2.0	–
3 (near the bottom)	–	0.3	2.2	6.5	13.1	19.6	24.1	22.6	16.5	7.4	2.0	–

== Flora and fauna ==
The shores of the lake contain individual willow trees and riparian forests, mostly composed of various species of Populus. Plants include common reed (Phragmites australis), lesser Indian reed mace (Typha angustata ) and several species of cane – Schoenoplectus littoralis, S. lacustris and endemic S. kasachstanicus. Under water grow two types of Myriophyllum – spiked (M. spicatum) and whorled (M. verticillatum); several kinds of Potamogeton – shining (P. lucens), perfoliate (P. perfoliatus), kinky (P. crispus), fennel (P. pectinatus) and P. macrocarpus; as well as common bladderwort (Utricularia vulgaris), rigid hornwort (Ceratophyllum demersum) and two species of Najas. Phytoplankton, the concentration of which was 1.127 g/L in 1985, is represented by numerous species of algae.

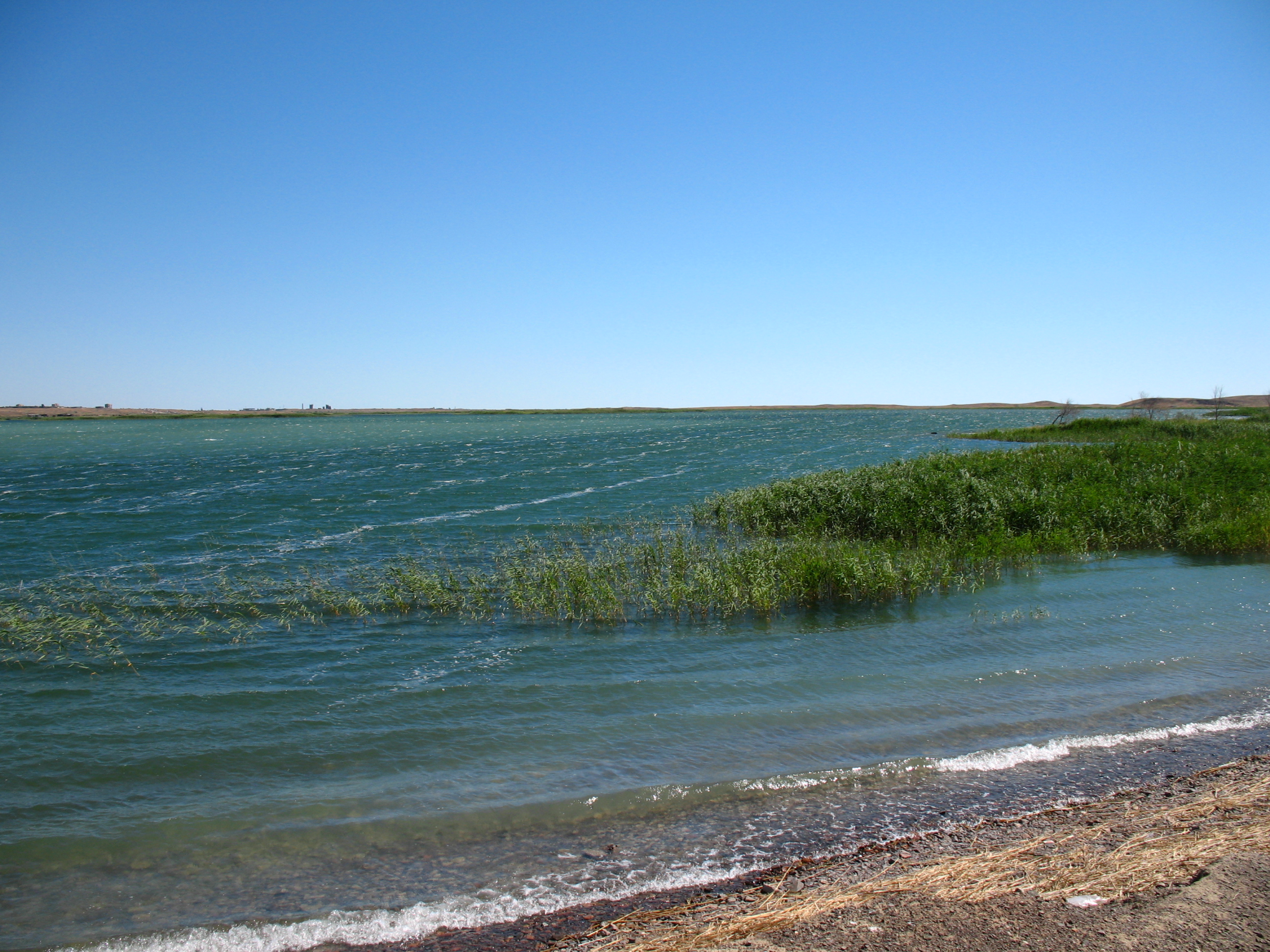
Coastal cane

The lake used to have a rich fauna, but since 1970, biodiversity began to decline due to deterioration of water quality. Before then, there were abundant shellfish, crustaceans, chironomidae and oligochaeta, as well as zooplankton (concentration 1.87 g/L in 1985), especially in the western part. The lake hosted about 20 species of fish, 6 of which were native: Ili marinka (Schizothorax pseudoaksaiensis), Balkhash marinka (S. argentatus), Balkhash perch (Perca schrenkii), Triplophysa strauchii, T. labiata and Balkhash minnow (Rhynchocypris poljakowii). Other fish species were alien: common carp (Cyprinus carpio), spine, Oriental bream (Abramis brama orientalis), Aral barbel (Luciobarbus brachycephalus), Siberian dace (Leuciscus baicalensis), tench (Tinca tinca), European perch (Perca fluviatilis), wels catfish (Silurus glanis), osman (Diptychus), Prussian carp (Carassius gibelio) and others. The fishery was focused on carp, perch, asp (Leuciscus aspius) and bream.

Abundant and dense reeds in the southern part of the lake, especially in the delta of the Ili River, served as a haven for birds and animals. Changes in the water level led to the degradation of the delta – since 1970, its area decreased from 3,046 to 1,876 km^{2}, reducing wetlands and riparian forests which were inhabited by birds and animals. Land development, application of pesticides, overgrazing and deforestation also contributed to the decrease in biodiversity. Of the 342 species of vertebrates, 22 are endangered and are listed in the Red Book of Kazakhstan. Forests of the Ili delta were inhabited by the rare (now probably extinct) Caspian tiger and its prey, wild boar. Around the 1940s, Canadian muskrat was brought to the Ili delta; it quickly acclimatized, feeding on Typha, and was trapped for fur, up to 1 million animals per year. However, recent changes in the water level destroyed its habitat, bringing the fur industry to a halt.

Balkhash is also the habitat of 120 types of bird, including cormorants, marbled teal, pheasants, golden eagle and great egret; 12 of those are endangered, including great white pelican, Dalmatian pelican, Eurasian spoonbill, whooper swan and white-tailed eagle.

== Cities and economy ==
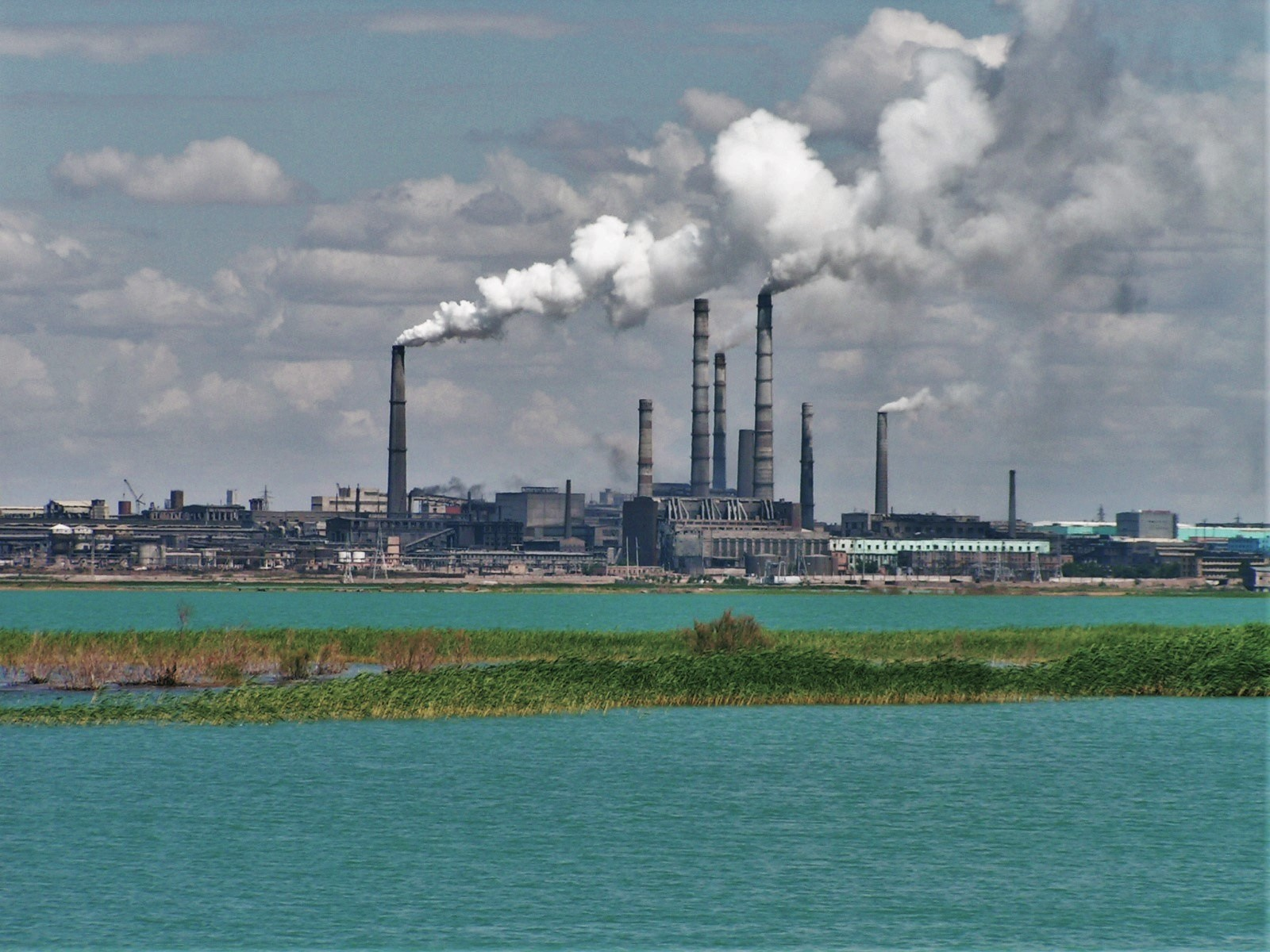
A view from the lake of the Balkhash Mining and Metallurgy Plant.

In 2005, 3.3 million people lived in the basin of the Lake Balkhash, including residents of Almaty – the largest city of Kazakhstan. The largest city on the lake is Balkhash with 66,724 inhabitants (2010). It is on the northern shore and has a prominent mining and metallurgy plant. A large copper deposit was discovered in the area in 1928–1930 and is being developed in the villages north of the lake. Part of the motorway between Bishkek and Karaganda runs along the western shore of the lake. The western shore also hosts military installations built during the Soviet era, such as radar missile warning systems. The southern shore is almost unpopulated and has only a few villages. The nature and wild life of the lake attract tourists, and there are several resorts on the lake. In 2021, Lake Balkhash was selected as one of the top 10 tourist destinations in the country of Kazakhstan.

=== Fishing ===
The economic importance of the lake is mostly in its fishing industry. Systematic breeding of fish began in 1930; the annual catch was 20 thousand tonnes in 1952, it increased to 30 thousands in the 1960s and included up to 70% of valuable species. However, by the 1990s production fell to 6,600 tonnes per year with only 49 tonnes of valuable breeds. The decline is attributed to several factors, including the halt of reproduction programs, poaching and decline in water level and quality.

=== Energy projects ===
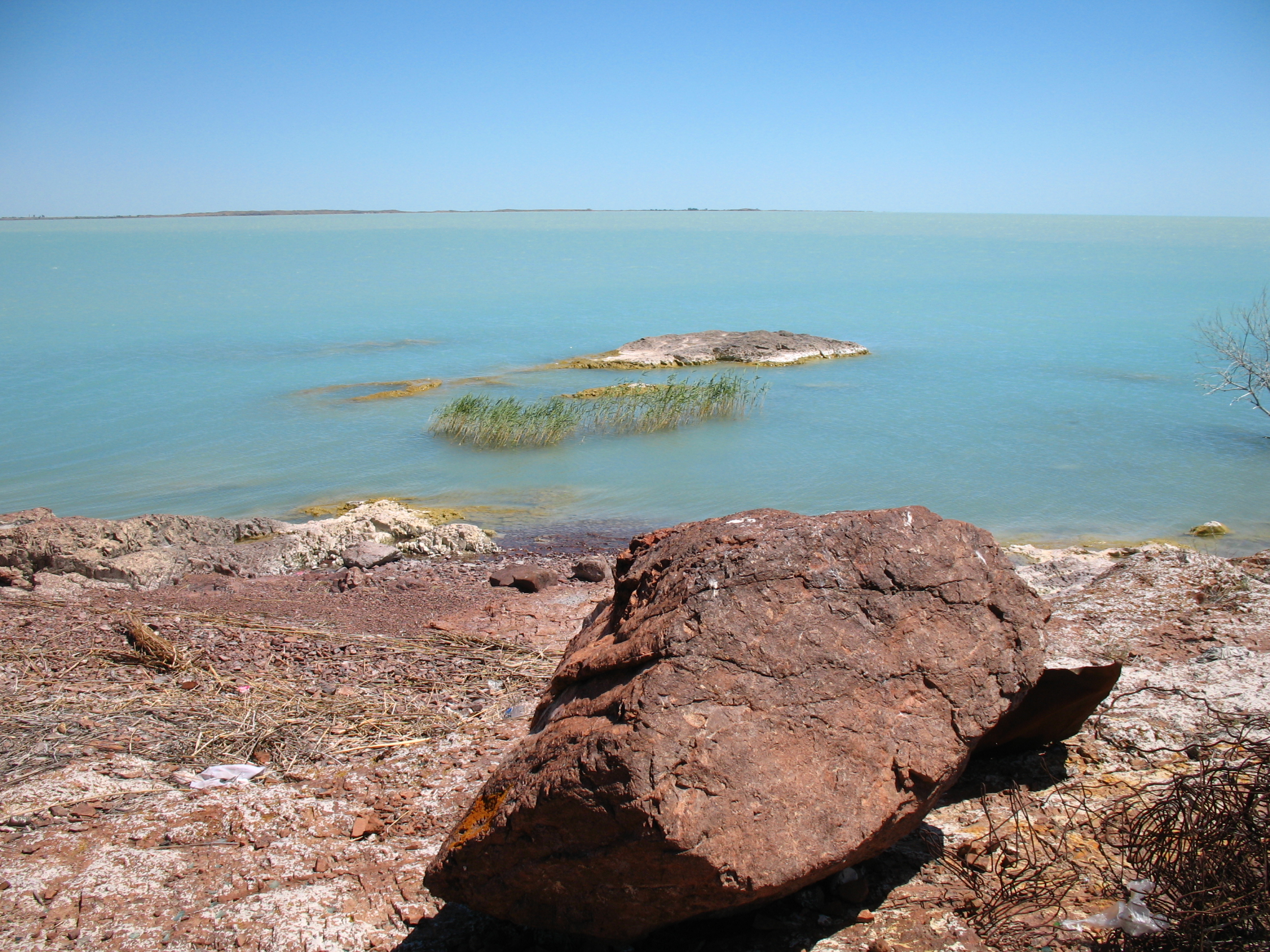
Lake Balkhash, the neighborhood of the city Priozersk

In 1970, the 364-megawatt Kapshagay Hydroelectric Power Plant was built on the Ili River, drawing water out of the new Kapshagay Reservoir for irrigation. Ili's water is also extensively used upstream, in the Xinjiang province of China, for the cultivation of cotton. Currently, there is a project for an additional counter-regulatory dam 23 km downstream from the Kapchagay. The associated 49.5-MW Kerbulak Hydroelectric Power Plant will partially solve the problem of providing electricity to the southern areas of Kazakhstan and will serve as a buffer for daily and weekly fluctuations in the water level of the Ili River.

Energy supply to the south-eastern part of Kazakhstan is an old problem, with numerous solutions proposed in the past. Proposals to build power plants on Balkhash in the late 1970s and 1980s stalled, and the initiative to erect a nuclear plant near the village Ulken met strong opposition from environmentalists and residents. Therefore, in 2008, the Kazakh government reconsidered and announced building of a Balkhash Thermal Power Plant.

However, in 2024 following a referendum, it was resolved to build a nuclear power plant.

=== Navigation ===
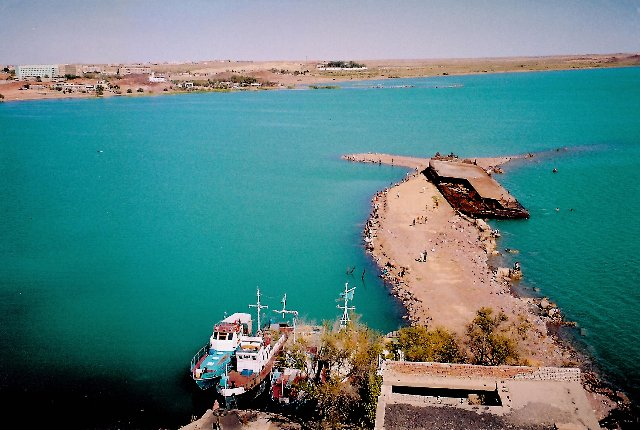
A pier near Balkhash City

There is a regular ship navigation through the lake, the mouth of the Ili River, and the Kapchagay Reservoir. The main piers are Burylbaytal and Burlitobe. The ships are relatively light due to the limiting depth in some parts of the lake; they are used mainly for catching fish and transporting fish and construction materials. The total length of the waterway is 978 km, and the navigation period is 210 days/year.

Navigation on the Lake Balkhash originated in 1931 with the arrival of two steamers and three barges. By 1996, up to 120,000 tonnes of building materials, 3,500 tonnes of ore, 45 tonnes of fish, 20 tonnes of melons and 3,500 passengers were transported on Balkhash (per year). During 2004 there were 1000 passengers and 43 tonnes of fish.

In 2004, the local fleets consisted of 87 vessels, including 7 passenger ships, 14 cargo barges and 15 tugboats. The government projected that 2012 would see in the Ili-Balkhash basin 233,000 tonnes of construction materials, at least 550,000 tonnes of livestock, fertiliser and foodstuffs and at least 53 tonnes of fish. Development of eco-tourism is expected to increase the passengers to 6,000 people per year.

== Environmental and political issues ==
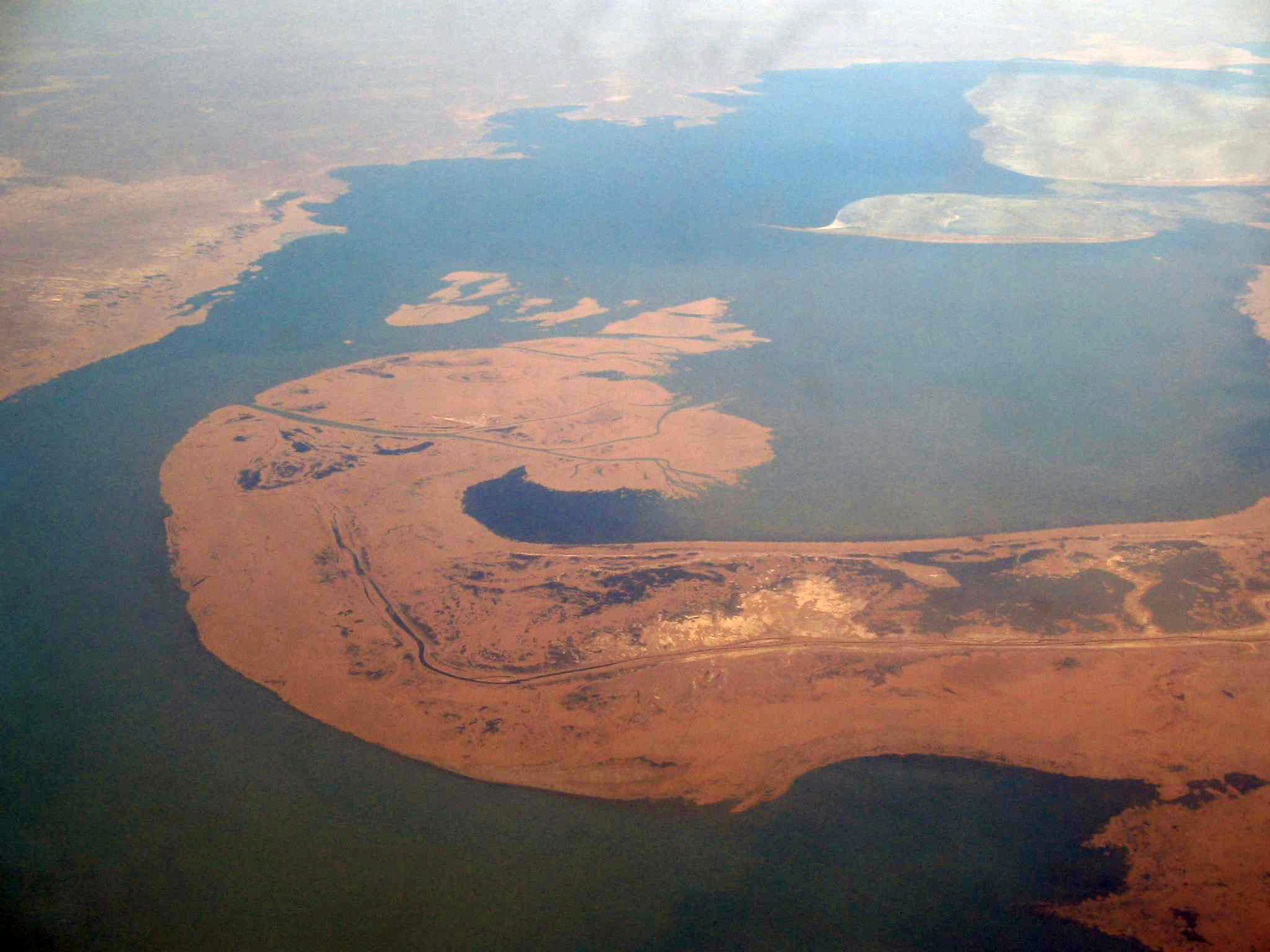
The central peninsula of the lake as seen from the air.

Academics and government advisors fear major loss of ecosystems in the lake. Unabashed industrial extraction would likely emulate the environmental disaster at the Aral Sea. Since 1970, the 39 km^{3} outflow of water to fill the Kapchagay Reservoir led to a 66% fall in inflow from the Ili. The concomitant decrease the lake's level was about 15.6 cm/year, much greater than the natural decline of 1908–1946 (9.2 cm/year). The shallowing is acute in the western "half". From 1972 until 2001, a small salt lake Alakol, 8 km south of Balkhash, had practically disappeared and the southern part of the lake lost about 150 km^{2} of water surface. Of the 16 existing lake systems around the lake only five remain. The desertification process involved about 1/3 of the basin. Salt dust is blown away from the dried areas, contributing to the generation of Asian dust storms, increase the soil salinity and adversely influencing the climate. Increasing formation of silt in the river's delta further reduces the inflow of water to the lake.

Water pollution index 0.5 – clean, 2 – dirty, 4 – very dirty
Location	1997	2000	2001
Gulf Tarangalyk	2.38	3.70	3.96
Gulf MA Sary-Shagan	2.56	4.83	4.52

Another factor affecting the ecology of the Ili-Balkhash basin is emissions due to mining and metallurgical processes, mostly at the Balkhash Mining and Metallurgy Plant operated by Kazakhmys. In the early 1990s, the emission level was 280–320 thousand tonnes per year, depositing 76 tonnes of copper, 68 tonnes of zinc and 66 tonnes of lead on the surface of the lake. Since then, emissions have almost doubled. Contaminants are also brought from the dump sites by the dust storms.

In 2000, a major conference, Balkhash 2000, brought together environmental scientists from different countries, as well as representatives of business and government. The conference adopted a resolution and appeal to the government of Kazakhstan and international organizations, suggesting new ways of managing the ecosystems of Alakol and Balkhash basins. At the 2005 International Environmental Forum devoted to Lake Balkhash, Kazakhmys announced that by 2006 it will restructure its processes, thereby reducing emissions by 80–90%.

Contamination of Balkhash originates not only locally, but is also brought by inflow of polluted water from China. China also consumes 14.5 km^{3} of water per year from the Ili River, with a planned increase of 3.6 times that. The current rate of the increase is 0.5–4 km^{3}/year. In 2007, the Kazakhstan government proposed a price reduction for sales of Kazakh products to China in exchange for reduction of water consumption from Ili River, but the offer was declined by China.

== See also ==
- Balkhash (city)
- Korzhin Island
