= Saryesik-Atyrau Desert =

Desert in eastern Kazakhstan

Coordinates: 45.5°N 77°E

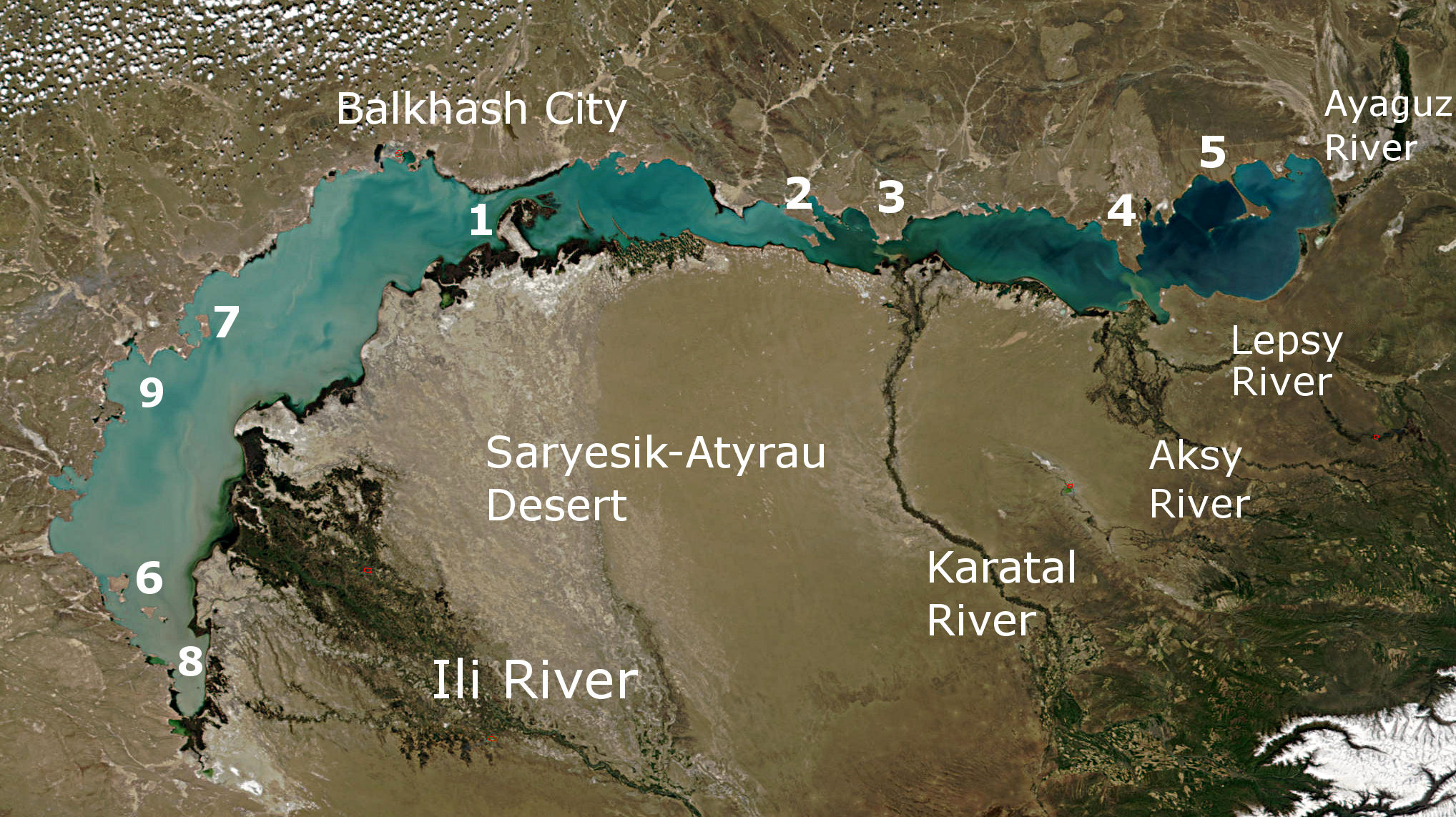
Satellite image of Saryesik-Atyrau Desert

The Saryesik Atyrau Desert (Kazakh: Сарыесікатырау, Saryesıkatyrau) is a desert in the Balkhash-Alakol Basin, eastern Kazakhstan. It stretches for about 400 km south of Lake Balkhash. It is a sand desert, relatively ecologically healthy with little erosion. There are a great number of small lakes and ponds in the desert, as well as occasional grasslands, that support a varied animal and bird population. In September 2017, English explorer Jamie Maddison completed a 70-mile, 30 hour ultra-marathon to make the first recorded on-foot crossing of the desert.

== Nature ==
The Saryesik-Atyrau Desert borders the Ili River delta in the west, which is home to a large wild boar population. The wild boar are mainly found in the reed beds, but enter the fringes of the desert. Here they are often found around karabarak bushes. The desert itself is home to goitered gazelles and a small population (about 150) of the Saiga antelope. The Asian wild ass (Equus hemionus kulan) however, is extinct in the area.
