= Lake Sasykkol =

Lake in eastern Kazakhstan

Sasykkol
- Сасықкөл
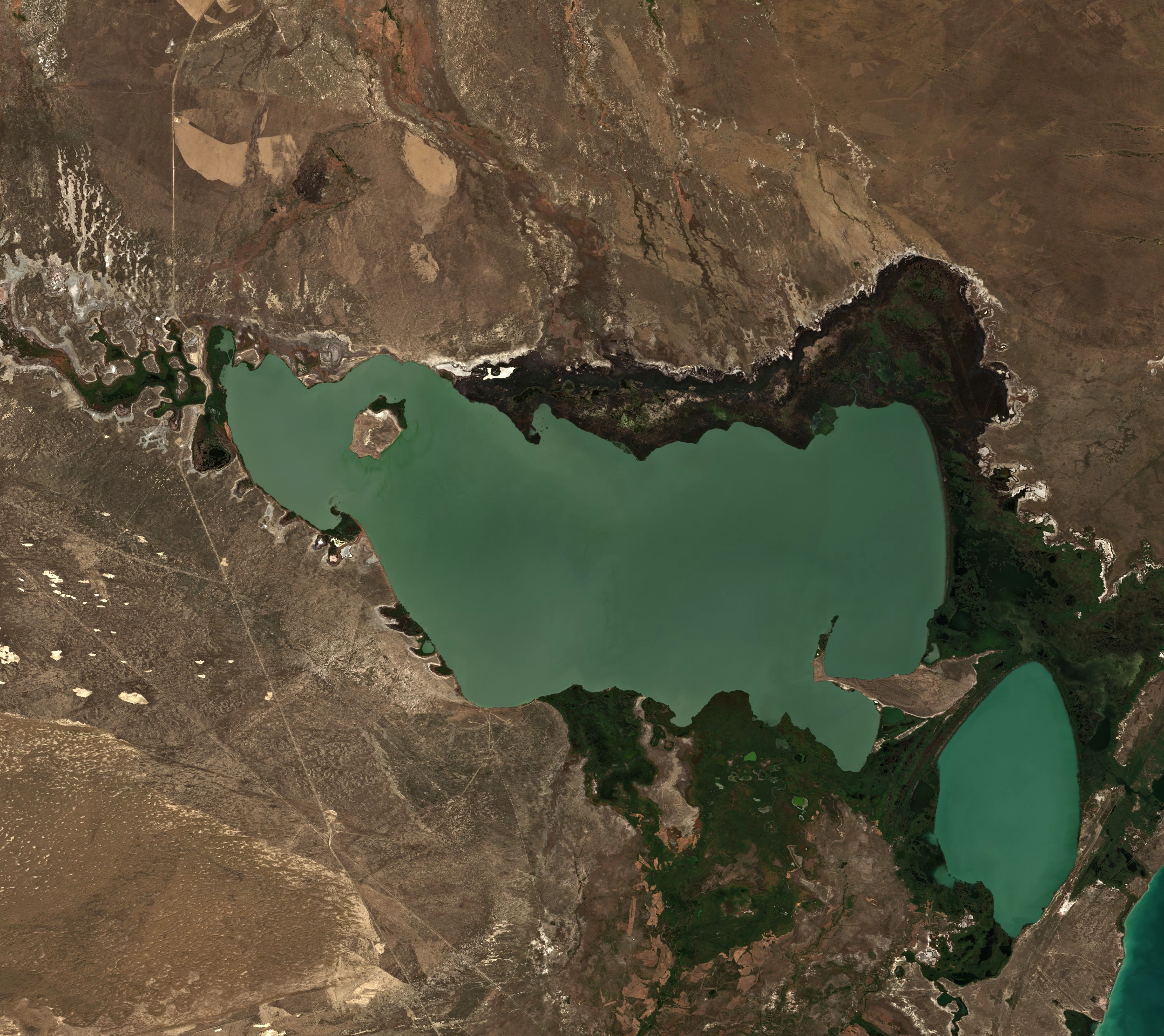
- Lake Sasykkol in 2021

- Location within Kazakhstan
- Location: Balkhash-Alakol Basin
- Coordinates: 46°35′0″N 81°0′0″E
- Basin countries: Kazakhstan
- Surface area: 600 km^{2} (230 sq mi); Max: 736 km^{2} (284 sq mi)
- Average depth: 3.3 m (11 ft)
- Max. depth: 4.7 m (15 ft)

Sasykkol (Kazakh: Сасықкөл, Sasyqköl) is a lake in eastern Kazakhstan. It is located near 46°35′0″N 81°0′0″E. It has a surface area of 600 km^{2} (736 km^{2} when water level is high), average depth of 3.3 m, and maximum depth of 4.7 m. Fishery on the lake is common. Water birds including the mute swan, whooper swan, and spoonbill can be found here.

== Description ==
Into the Sasykkol lake (translated from the Kazakh language "Sasyk" - rotten, fetid;" Kol " - lake), in the delta of the Alakol Biosphere Reserve, flows the Tentek river from the south. The average depth of the lake is about 3 m, and the maximum depth is 4.7 m. The average annual water level varies up to 60 cm due to the fact that the lake is flowing. Through the river Zhinishkesu water goes to Lake Koshkarkol and then flows into Lake Alakol. Since the water in the lake is fresh, its mineralization varies during the year from 0.27 to 2.16 g/L.

Lake Sasykkol is part of the Alakol Biosphere Reserve, designated by UNESCO as part of its Man and the Biosphere Programme in 2013.
