= Dzungarian Alatau =

Mountain range in Kazakhstan and China

Coordinates: 45°00′00″N 80°00′00″E

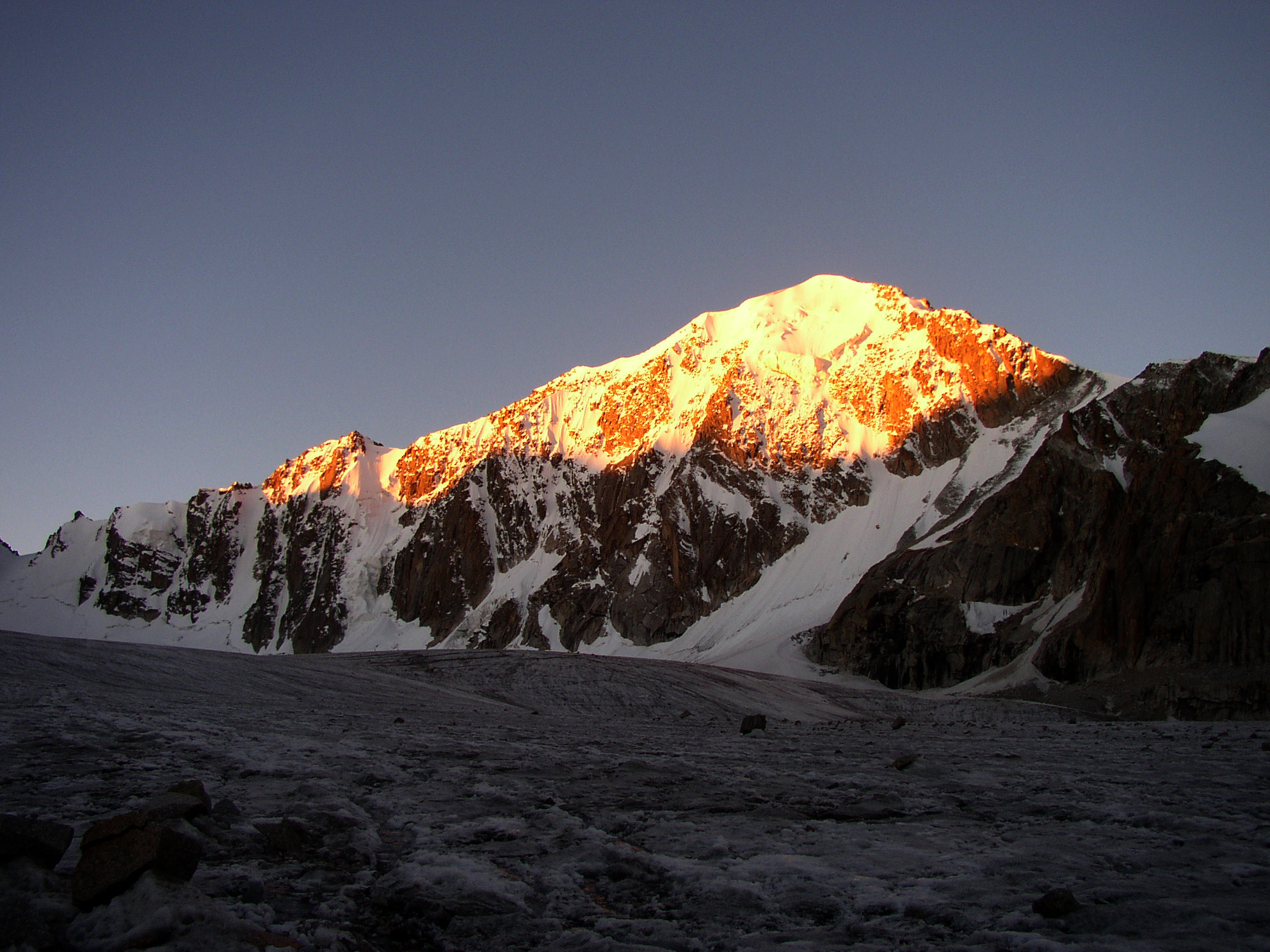

Geography
- Location: Boundary between the Dzungaria region of China and the Zhetysu region of Kazakhstan

Climbing
- Easiest route: Buses from Almaty

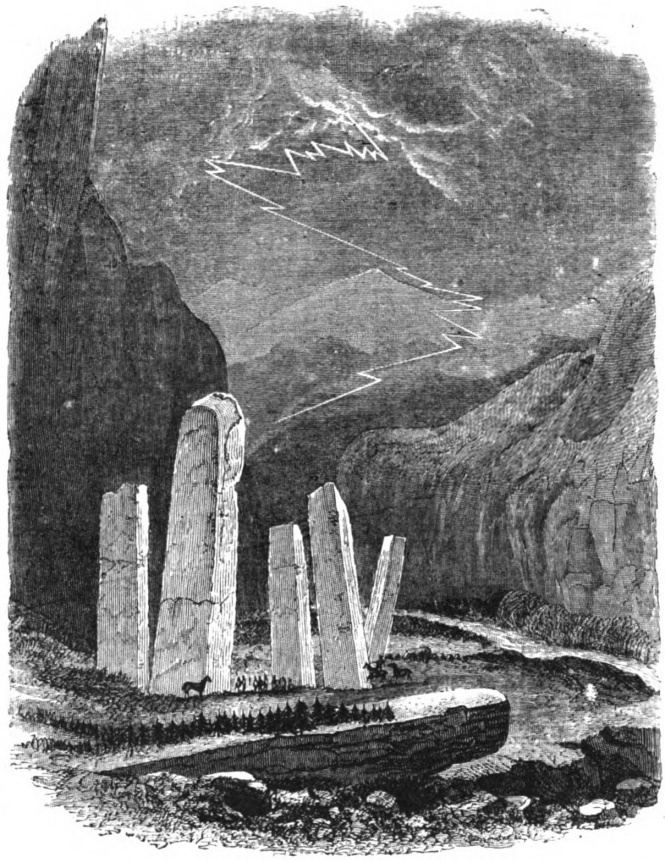
Megaliths. The Kora River gorge and valley in Djungar Alatau Mountains 1863 (nowadays eastern Kazakhstan)

The Dzungarian Alatau (Note: Mongolian: Зүүнгарын Алатау, romanized: Züüngariin Alatau; Chinese: 阿拉套山; pinyin: Ālātào Shān; Dungan: Алато сан, romanized: Alato san; Kazakh: Жетісу Алатауы, romanized: Jetısu Alatauy; Kyrgyz: Жети-суу ала-тоосу, romanized: Jeti-suu ala-toosu; Russian: Джунгарский Алатау, romanized: Džungarskij Alatau) is a mountain range that lies on the boundary of the Dzungaria region of China and the Zhetysu region of Kazakhstan. It has a length of 450 km (280 mi) and a maximum elevation of 4,464 m (14,646 ft).

== Features ==
The Dzungarian Alatau consists of foothills, ridges, forts, and alpine meadows of the Northern Tian Shan (Trans-Ili Alatau, Ktmen). It is located at an altitude of 2,000m above sea level, and is over 400km long in the latitudinal direction. The Dzungarian Alatau consists of two ranges that are distinctly parallel to each other: the northern (or main), and the southern range.

The area includes several sub-parallel high mountain ranges, accompanied by low and short ranges and their spurs. It also holds the largest waterfall in Central Asia.

A distinctive feature of the Dzungarian Alatau is a series of sharp slopes. These are divided into low mountains (700–1600 m), medium lands (1600–3100 m) and highlands (3100–4662 m). There are numerous locations of petroglyphs mainly situated in the low- and mid-hills. The highest peak of the range is Semeonov Tien-Shansky (4622 m).

The area is mostly unexplored. 33 species from the polymorphic genus Allium L. have been found in the area. They belong to the subgenera Rhizirideum, Allium and Melanocrommyum, and are distributed from the foothills to alpine belts.

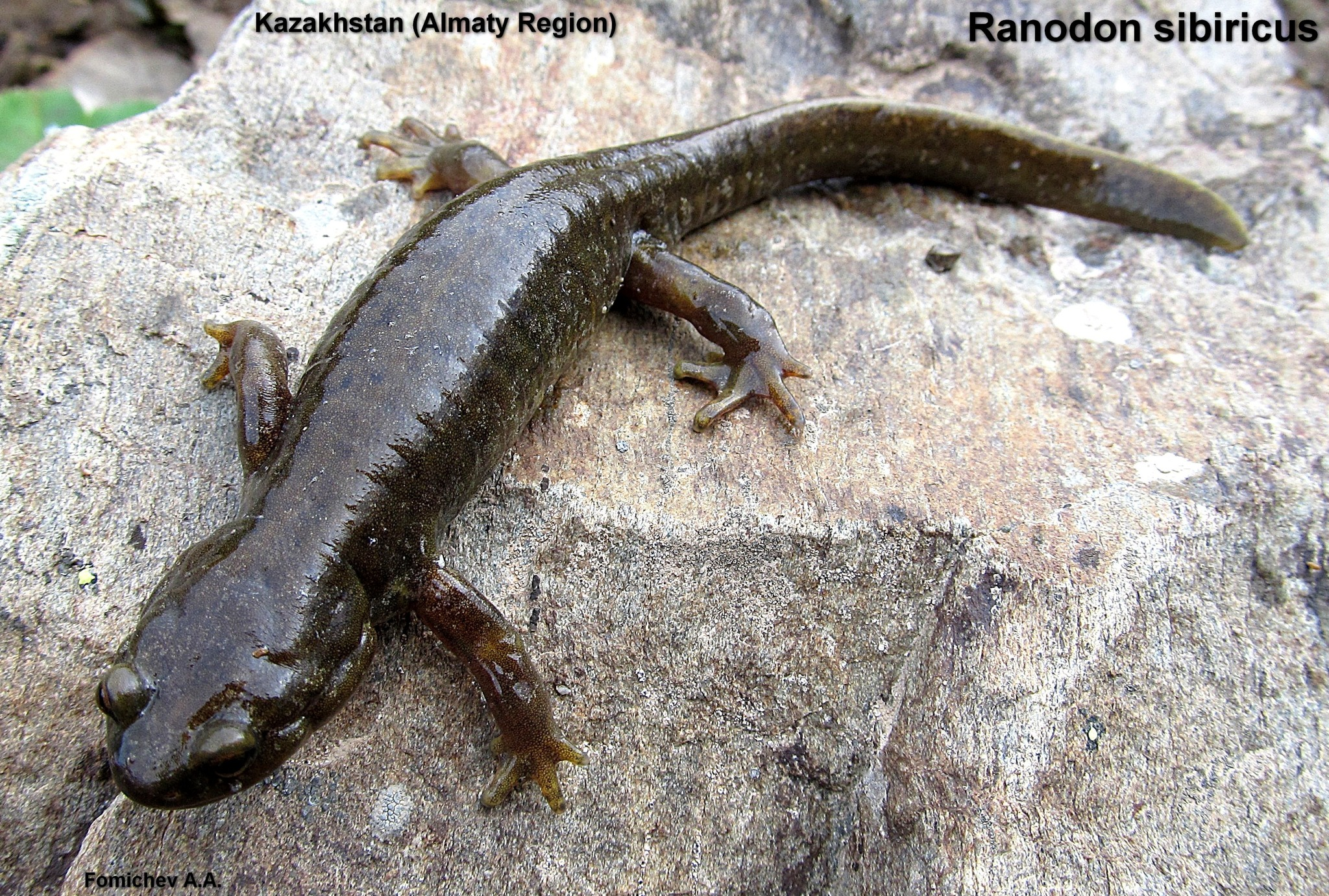
The Semirechensk Salamander is found nowhere else in the world.

The Semirechensk Salamander (Ranodon sibiricus) is endemic to these mountains. It lives in streams and has highly reduced lungs. Due to its small population and extremely small distribution it is considered endangered. This salamander is threatened by poaching for medical purposes or the pet trade, over grazing, and harmful fishing practices.

== Tourism ==
There are two resorts that operate in the area. They are called Tekesu and Tau Zhetisu. Tekeli can be accessed via public transport from Almaty's main bus station to Taldykurgan. From Taldykurgan, marshrutkas are available to reach Tekeli.

The area is often visited by climbers for alpine-style climbing. The area currently consists of approximately 4600 meters on relatively unexplored mountains. At the eastern end of the chain, near the China–Kazakhstan border, lies the Dzungarian Gate, a pass which for centuries was used as an invasion route by conquerors from Central Asia.
