= Qumzhota =

Village in Kazakhstan

Coordinates: 42°58′38″N 71°24′9″E

Qumzhota (Kumzhota) is a village in the Bayzak District of the Jambyl Region in south-eastern Kazakhstan.

== Location ==
The village is located approximately 7 km southwest of Sarykemer.

== Population ==
Nowadays there are about 13 000 people of more than 30 nationalities living in Kumzhota. The total population is 12,228 people, including 2,589 young people aged 14 to 29, which is 21.2% of the total population.

- By gender, the number of men is 1348, the number of women is 1241.
- By age categories, from 14 to 18 years old - 487, 19-24 years old - 1240, 25-29 - 862 people.

== History ==
In 1961–1997, the village was part of the Rovnyi village. On its basis, since 1997, a production cooperative, limited liability partnership, and several farms have been created in Kumzhota.

Toponymy - the name "Kumzhota" consists of two bases in the Kazakh language, oikonym. The same name is given to a street in the village of Buryl and a highland in the Merkinsky district.

== Infrastructure ==
Rural institutions In Kumzhota, there are 2 secondary schools (Secondary School named after Y. Altynsarin), 1 art school, 3 kindergartens, 1 minimarket, family clinic, club, and library. In addition, the village has a park "Victory" in honor of the veterans of the Great Patriotic War.

Components of the village (microdistrict, streets):

- Talas microdistrict
- Bobek Ata street
- Zhambyl street
- Abay street
- Dangyl Ata street
- Dangyl Ata street turn
- Auezov street
- Zholdybai Ata street
- Zhaidarbek street
- Bitaeva street
- Kalmataeva street
- Zhailauov street
- St. Almyrza
- Aytzhanov street
- Nur

== Agricultural industry ==
Currently, there are 193 farms in the village. Most of them are engaged in livestock breeding. The harvest in the village is also good.

- Number of farms - 193;
- The total area of the land plot is 6094 hectares;
- The area in agricultural land - 5164 ha;
- Arable land - 2379 hectares; irrigated land - 2785 hectares; Pastoral lands - 229
- hectares.

Agriculture: 500 acres of wheat, 600 hectares of safflower, 500 hectares of barley, 310 hectares of maize, 1050 hectares of greenery, horticulture - 50 hectares, sugar beet - 341.7 hectares, potatoes - 70 hectares, lucerne - 1605.

Cattle breeding: There are cattle - 3090; sheep, goats - 9500; horses - 965; pigs - 220; bird - 5800.

== Nature ==
Soil The soil in the village is gray, sandy in the north, and pale brown in the south. To the west there are ridges.

Climate The average air temperature in the village of Kumzhota is 6-9 ° С in January and 23-26 ° С in July. The average annual rainfall is from 150 to 300 mm.

Flora and fauna Wormwood, saxaul, and reed grow along the river. Animals include wolves, foxes, rabbits, marmots, badgers, wild boars, saigas, squirrels, voles, birds, voles, partridges, and pheasants. Several species of carp, perch, pike, and fry are found in the rivers.

== Problem ==
The problems for the villagers were the availability of drinking water, sewage, electricity, and gas, as well as medical services.

== Implementation of governmental projects ==
In 2019 with the support of Prime Minister Askar Mamin, the public project was launched. The goal of the project is to improve the quality of life by modernizing the infrastructure in rural areas. The project is included in the State Program of Regional Development for 2020–2025, approved by the Government of the Republic of Kazakhstan on December 27, 2019, No.990

The project identified 3561 support villages and satellite villages with development potential throughout the country, including 238 in the Zhambyl region (67 support villages and 171 satellite villages), including the village of Buryl as support and the village of Kumzhota as a satellite.
