= Zhailaukol =

Zhailaukol Жайлаукөл
- Village
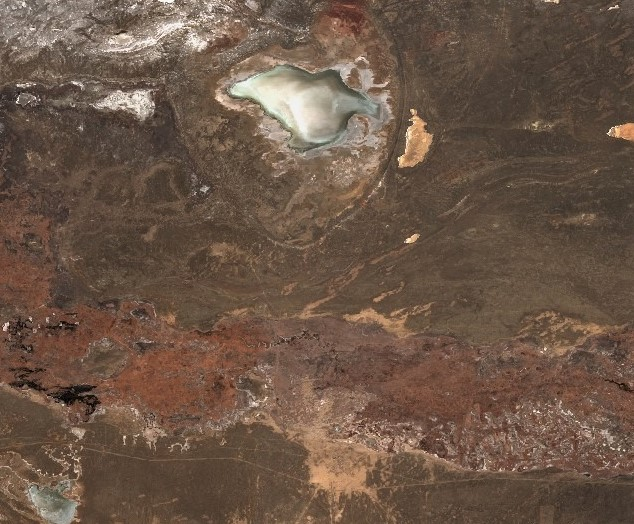
- Zhailaukol (below) and Buralkynyn Tuzy (above) Sentinel-2 image

- Location in Kazakhstan
- Coordinates: 44°50′22″N 70°26′38″E
- Country: Kazakhstan
- Region: Jambyl Region
- District: Sarysu District

Population (2009)
  - Total: 464
- Time zone: UTC+6 (East Kazakhstan Time)
- Post code: 080705

Zhailaukol (Kazakh: Жайлаукөл) is a village in Sarysu District, Jambyl Region, Kazakhstan. It is the administrative center of the Kamkala Rural District (KATO code - 316039200). Population: 464 (2009 census results); 902 (1999 census results).

Kazakh band MuzArt perform a song about the village composed by Ilya Zhakanov.

== Geography ==
The village lies 151 kilometers (94 mi) northeast of Janatas the district capital, at the northern edge of the Moiynkum Desert and south of the Betpak-Dala, near the left bank of the lower course of the Chu river. Shyganak village is located 33 kilometers (21 mi) to the west and the Buralkynyn Tuzy, a large sor, 13 kilometers (8.1 mi) to the north.
