= Aktogay, Sarysu District =

Aktogay Ақтоғай
- Location within Kazakhstan
- Coordinates: 43°26′52″N 69°52′56″E
- Country: Kazakhstan
- Regions of Kazakhstan: Zhambyl Region
- Districts of Kazakhstan: Sarysu District

Population (2009)
  - Total: 781
- Time zone: UTC+6 (East Kazakhstan Time)
- Post code: 080704

Aktogay (Kazakh: Ақтоғай) is a town located in the Sarysu District, Zhambyl Region, Kazakhstan. It is part of Zhanaaryk rural district (КАТО code — 316037200).

== Demographics ==
According to the 2009 Kazakhstan census, the town has a population of 781 people. In 1999 the town had a population of 806.

== Geography ==
The town is located in the northern slopes of the Karatau Range by the right bank of the Shabakty river, south of its confluence with the Kyrshabakty, its main tributary.
