= Sorkol (Chu basin) =

Lake in Kazakhstan

- Соркөл
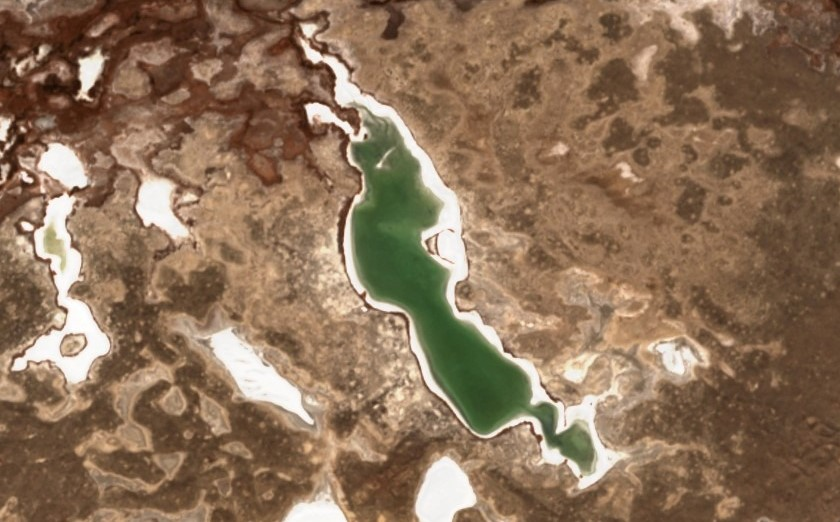
- Sentinel-2 image of the lake in October

- Location within Kazakhstan
- Location: Sarysu District
- Coordinates: 44°55′28″N 69°51′14″E
- Type: salt lake
- Basin countries: Kazakhstan
- Max. length: 3.3 kilometers (2.1 mi)
- Max. width: 0.9 kilometers (0.56 mi)
- Shore length^{1}: 9 kilometers (5.6 mi)
- Surface elevation: 340 meters (1,120 ft)
- ^{1} Shore length is not a well-defined measure.

Sorkol (Kazakh: Соркөл) is a salt lake in the Sarysu District, Jambyl Region, Kazakhstan.

The lake is located 8 kilometers (5.0 mi) to the northwest of Shyganak village. The surrounding area is used as a grazing ground for local cattle throughout the year.

== Geography ==
Sorkol lies in the lower Chu River basin. It is located less than 4 kilometers (2.5 mi) to the south of the Chu river channel, and 14 kilometers (8.7 mi) to the northwest of the Kamkaly twin lakes. The lake stretches roughly from NNW to ESE for more than 3 kilometers (1.9 mi). Its eastern shores are somewhat steep and the western are low and flat.

The area to the north and northwest of the lake gets flooded seasonally. Sorkol freezes at the end of November and thaws in March. On average the water level rises right after the melting of the snows in the spring and decreases in the summer.

== See also ==
- List of lakes of Kazakhstan
- Sor (geomorphology)
