= Sorasha =

Lake in Kazakhstan

- Сораша
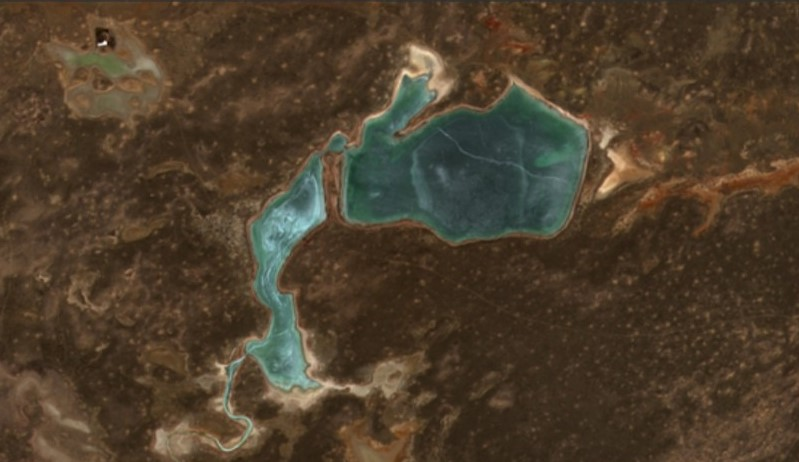
- Sentinel-2 image of the lake under ice

- Location within Kazakhstan
- Location: Sarysu District
- Coordinates: 44°53′46″N 69°40′35″E
- Basin countries: Kazakhstan
- Max. length: 3.2 kilometers (2.0 mi)
- Max. width: 1 kilometer (0.62 mi)
- Surface area: 2.1 square kilometers (0.81 sq mi)
- Residence time: UTC+6
- Islands: no

Sorasha (Kazakh: Сораша) is a lake in the Sarysu District, Jambyl Region, Kazakhstan.

Shyganak village is located 25 kilometers (16 mi) to the ESE.

== Geography ==
Sorasha lies in the lower Chu river basin. It is located less than 6 kilometers (3.7 mi) to the south of the main Chu river channel. 25 kilometers (16 mi) to the ESE lie the Ulken Kamkaly and Kishi Kamkaly lakes, and Shortankol 18 kilometers (11 mi) to the southeast. The main lake body is in the northern part and a narrow sound connects it with a long southwestern projection that stretches from north to south. An unnamed river enters the lake from the southern end.

Usually Sorasha freezes in November and its ice thaws by April.

== See also ==
- List of lakes of Kazakhstan
