= Zhambyl District =

Zhambyl District may also refer to:

- Zhambyl District, Almaty Province, a district of Almaty Province in Kazakhstan.
- Zhambyl District, North Kazakhstan Province, a district of North Kazakhstan Province in Kazakhstan.
- Zhambyl District, Zhambyl Province, a district of Zhambyl Province in Kazakhstan.
