= Buralkynyn Tuzy =

Salt lake in Kazakhstan

- Бұралқының тұзы
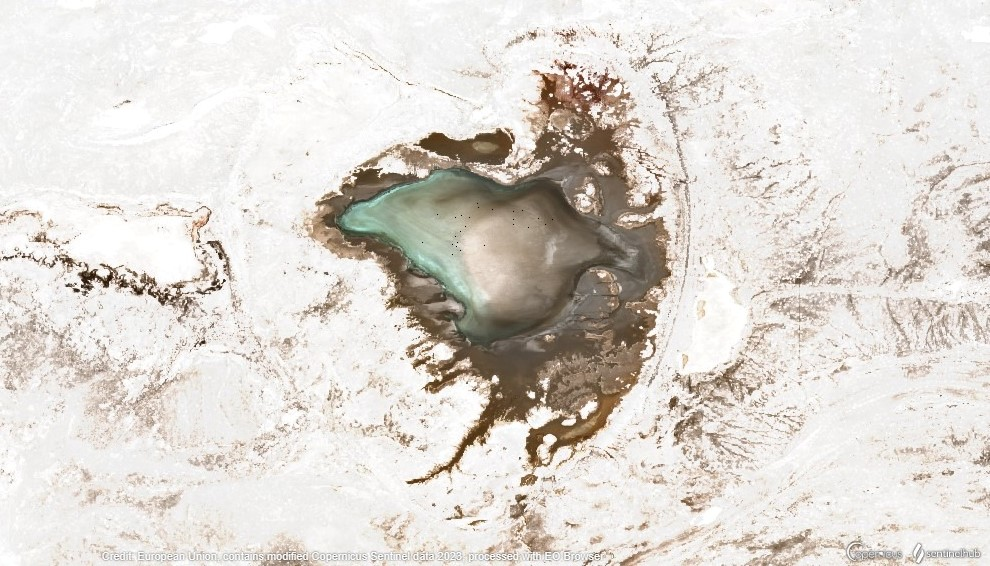
- Sentinel-2 image of the lake in February.

- Location within Kazakhstan
- Location: Betpak-Dala
- Coordinates: 45°0′N 70°25′E
- Type: Sor
- Basin countries: Kazakhstan
- Max. length: 11 kilometers (6.8 mi)
- Max. width: 7 kilometers (4.3 mi)
- Surface elevation: 211 meters (692 ft)

Buralkynyn Tuzy (Kazakh: Бұралқының тұзы; Russian: Буралкынынтузы) is a salt lake in Sarysu District, Zhambyl Region, Kazakhstan.

Zhailaukol village is located 8 kilometers (5.0 mi) to the south of the southern shore.

== Geography ==
Buralkynyn Tuzy is a sor-type of lake in the Chu basin. It is located to the west of 330 meters (1,080 ft) high Mount Andagul in an arid zone at the southern edge of the Betpak-Dala, north of the lower Chu valley. The Chu river flows westwards 8.3 kilometers (5.2 mi) to the south of the lake. The western part of the lake basin is flat and the eastern is steep.

The lake fills during the spring thaw and usually dries up completely in the summer. If it has water at the end of the fall, it does not freeze in the winter owing to its high salinity.

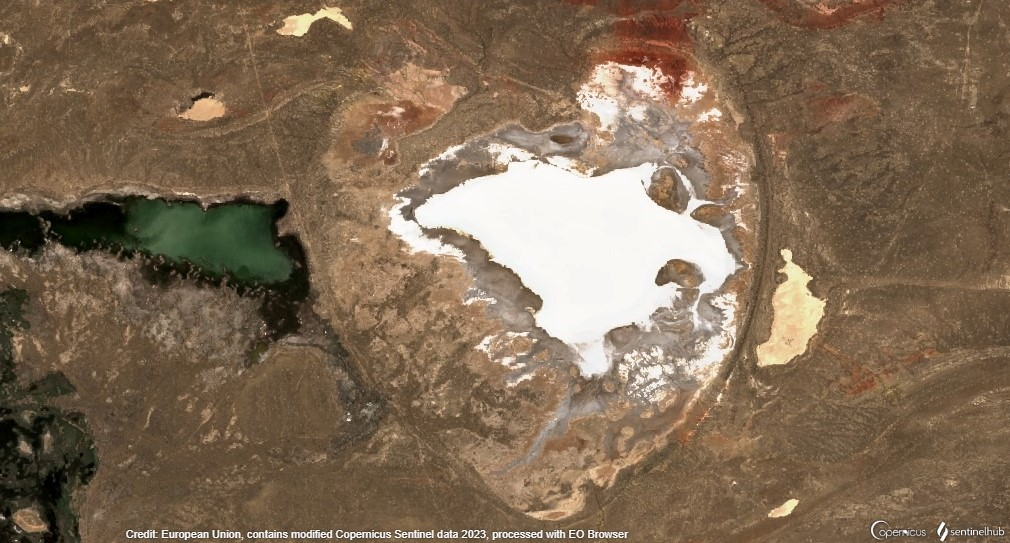
Sentinel-2 image of the dry lake in May.

== See also ==
- Kazakh semi-desert
- List of lakes of Kazakhstan
