= Karatau, Kazakhstan =

Karatau Қаратау Qaratau
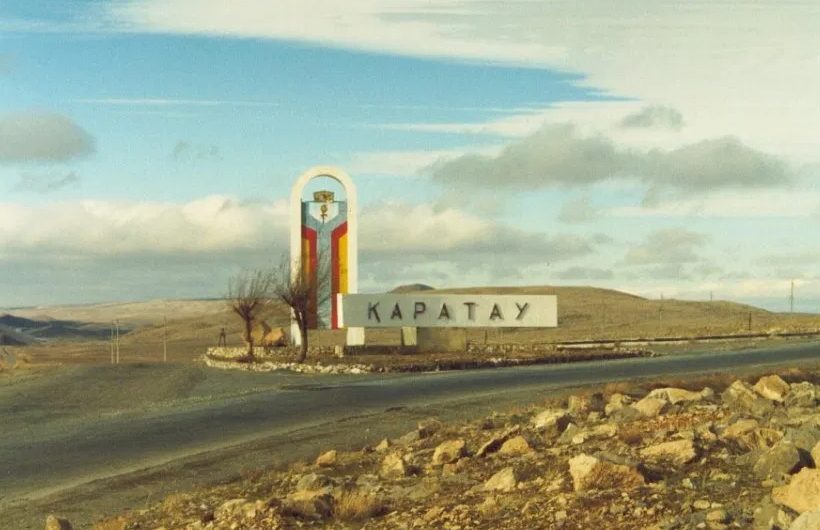

- Location in Kazakhstan
- Coordinates: 43°10′N 70°27′E
- Country: Kazakhstan
- Region: Jambyl Region
- Settlement: 1963

Government
  - Akim (mayor): Madibek Kanatbek Kaishybekovich

Population (2019)
  - Total: 27,667
- Time zone: UTC+6
- Postal code: 080800-080803
- Area code: +7 72644

Karatau (Kazakh: Қаратау, Qaratau) is an administrative center in the Talas region located in the Jambyl Region in the south of Kazakhstan. It has an estimated population of roughly 30,000 in 1999. As of 2019, the population is now 27,667. The largest city from Karatau, Taraz, is approximately 100 km to the southeast.

== Name ==
The name Karatau means Black Mountain in the Kazakh language. Karatau was named after the Karatau Mountain range which it is located next to and was famous during the Soviet era for phosphate.

As part of the de-russification of the Kazakh language, Karatau will be re-written with Latin scripts in 2025 and spelled Qaratau.

== Ghost Town ==
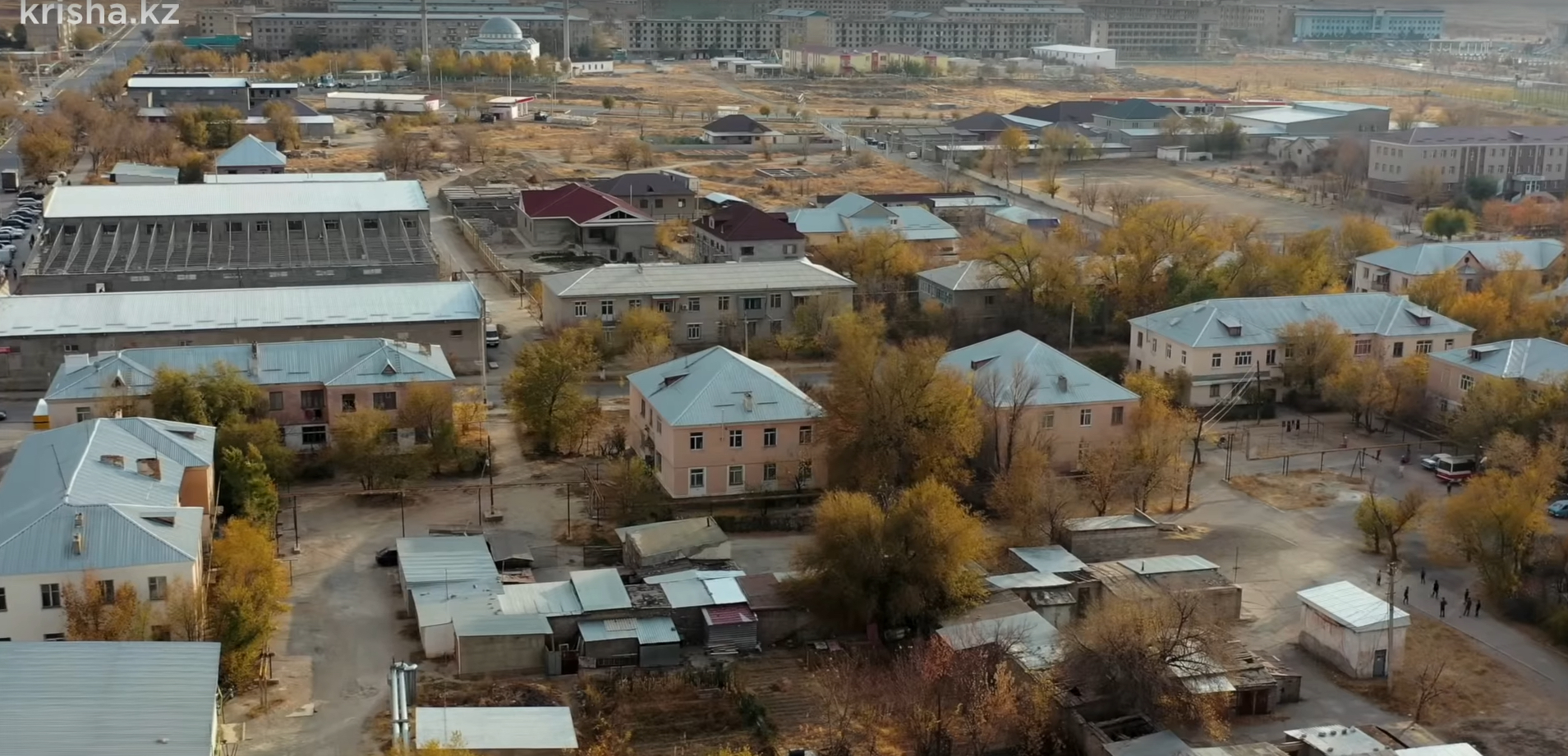
A view of Karatau from Dec., 2019

Krisha KZ reported on Karatau describing this town as a ghost town in December, 2019. The value of apartments in Karatau, according to Krisha, was between $3300–$11,500 USD.

== Economy ==
=== Industry ===
During the Soviet Union times, the main functioning industrial enterprise in the town was the phosphorite factory.

=== Transportation ===
Karatau is connected by railway with Taraz. There is also a bus and private taxi services to Taraz.

== Geography ==
Karatau is located along a mountain range, a northwest spur of the Tien-Shan. Length, about 420 km (260 mi); maximum altitude, 2,176 m (7,139 ft) at Mount Bessaz. The range is composed of shale, sandstone, and a considerable amount of limestone and dolomite, in which karst formations are well developed. The mountains have flattened tops and steep slopes and are covered with steppe vegetation and mountain xerophytes. There are important deposits of phosphorites.

=== Climate ===
Karatau has a cold semi-arid climate (Köppen climate classification BSk) with strong continental influences. It has a mean January temperature of −5 °C (23 °F) and a mean July temperature of 26.5 °C (79.7 °F).

Climate data for Karatau
Month	Jan	Feb	Mar	Apr	May	Jun	Jul	Aug	Sep	Oct	Nov	Dec	Year
Mean daily maximum °C (°F)	0 (32)	2 (36)	11 (52)	20 (68)	28 (82)	32 (90)	35 (95)	32 (90)	27 (81)	19 (66)	9 (48)	1 (34)	18 (65)
Mean daily minimum °C (°F)	−10 (14)	−7 (19)	−1 (30)	6 (43)	11 (52)	16 (61)	18 (64)	16 (61)	10 (50)	2 (36)	−4 (25)	−8 (18)	4 (39)
Average precipitation mm (inches)	25 (1.0)	27 (1.1)	30 (1.2)	35 (1.4)	25 (1.0)	10 (0.4)	5 (0.2)	5 (0.2)	5 (0.2)	15 (0.6)	25 (1.0)	35 (1.4)	242 (9.7)
Source: Svali.ru

== See also ==
- Otrar
- Janatas
- Karatau mine
- Petroglyphs of Arpa-Uzen
