= Karakat, Jambyl Region =

Karakat Қарақат
- Coordinates: 42.889993°N 72.743105°E
- Country: Kazakhstan
- Region: Jambyl Region
- District: Turar Ryskulov District

Population (2009)
  - Total: 161

Karakat (Kazakh: Қарақат) is an aul in the Turar Ryskulov District, Jambyl Region, Kazakhstan.

== Demographics ==
In the 2009 Kazakhstani Census, Karakat had a reported population of 161 people (78 men and 83 women).

As of 1999, Karakat had a population of 779 people (396 men and 383 women).
