= Akzhar =

Lake group in Kazakhstan

- Ақжар
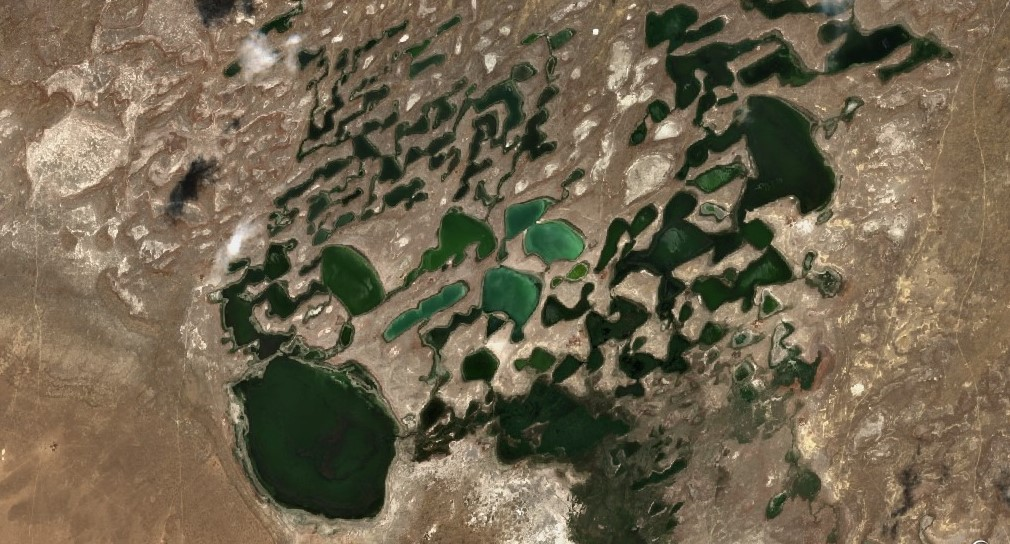
- Sentinel-2 image of the lake group in June 2019

- Location within Kazakhstan
- Location: Muyunkum Desert
- Coordinates: 44°0′N 69°45′E
- Type: Endorheic lake group
- Primary inflows: Talas, Shabakty
- Basin countries: Kazakhstan
- Max. length: ca 40 kilometers (25 mi)
- Max. width: ca 30 kilometers (19 mi)
- Surface elevation: 305 meters (1,001 ft)

Akzhar (Kazakh: Ақжар; Russian: Акжар) is a salt lake group in the Zhambyl and Turkistan regions, Kazakhstan.

The lakes lie northwest of Saudakent town and northeast of Kumkent. The Akzhar lake zone includes a 25,714 hectares (63,540 acres) Important Bird Area.

== Geography ==
The cluster of lakes is located in an arid, sandy sector of the Muyunkum Desert to the north of the northern slopes of the Karatau Mountains. The border between the Sozak District of Turkestan Region and Sarysu District of Zhambyl Region runs from the SSW to NNE across the lakes. The lakes are all salty and, although there are considerable seasonal changes in water levels, many are dry most of the year. In between the waterbodies there are sandy dunes or mounds, interspersed with alkaline patches, salt marshes and salt flats.

The lakes are scattered over a large area. They are numerous, but all are small. Akzhar, the largest individual lake, lies in the southwestern end, and lake Zhylkybay (Жылқыбай) close to the eastern edge, 21 km (13 mi) north of Igilik village. The Talas river reaches the northern end from the east and sinks in the sands. The Shabakty river has its mouth in the southern part of the lake area, but its waters very rarely reach it.

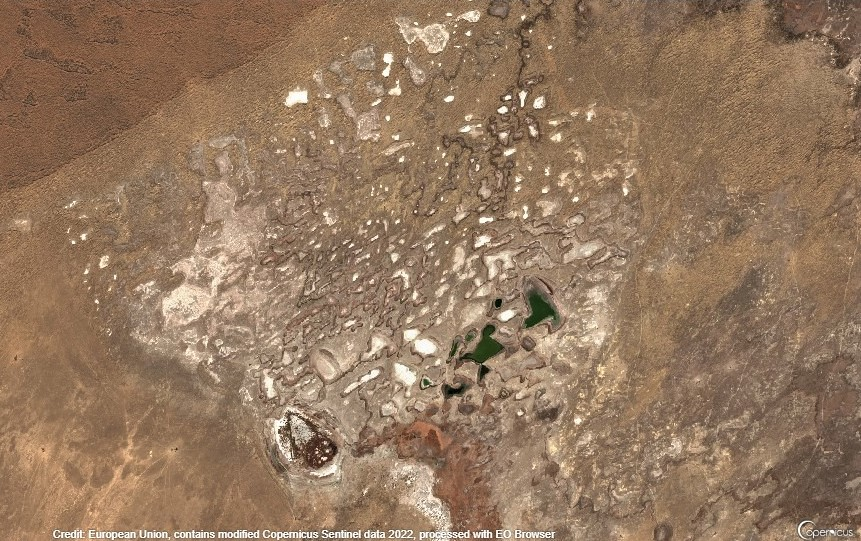
Sentinel-2 image of the wider lake group in October 2022.

== Flora and fauna ==
Most lakes have bare, barren-looking, shores. Tamarisk and, less frequently, saxaul may be found in some stretches. Festuca and saltwort may grow sparsely in the land areas in between. The Akzhar lakes are an important place for the breeding, migrating and wintering of a number of bird species.

== See also ==
- List of lakes of Kazakhstan
- List of fossiliferous stratigraphic units in Kazakhstan
