= Saudakent =

Saudakent Саудакент
- Location within Kazakhstan
- Coordinates: 43°44′16″N 69°55′06″E
- Country: Kazakhstan
- Regions of Kazakhstan: Zhambyl Region
- Districts of Kazakhstan: Sarysu District
- Elevation: 324 m (1,063 ft)

Population (2009)
  - Total: 5,313
- Time zone: UTC+6 (East Kazakhstan Time)
- Post code: 080710

Saudakent (Kazakh: Саудакент), known as Baikadam until 1993, is a town located in the Sarysu District, Zhambyl Region, Kazakhstan. It is part of Baikadam rural district (КАТО code — 316033100).

== Demographics ==
According to the 2009 Kazakhstan census, the town has a population of 5313 people. In 1999 the town had a population of 5864.

== Geography ==
The town is located by the banks of the Shabakty river to the southeast of the Akzhar lakes, 25 kilometers (16 mi) northeast of the district center, the city of Zhanatas.

=== Climate ===
Saudakent has a semi-arid climate (Köppen: BSk) with cold winters and hot summers.

Climate data for Saudakent (1991–2020)
Month	Jan	Feb	Mar	Apr	May	Jun	Jul	Aug	Sep	Oct	Nov	Dec	Year
Mean daily maximum °C (°F)	−0.6 (30.9)	2.4 (36.3)	11.6 (52.9)	20.6 (69.1)	27.5 (81.5)	33.2 (91.8)	34.9 (94.8)	33.5 (92.3)	27.2 (81.0)	19.1 (66.4)	8.5 (47.3)	1.0 (33.8)	18.2 (64.8)
Daily mean °C (°F)	−5.5 (22.1)	−3.3 (26.1)	4.7 (40.5)	13.0 (55.4)	19.5 (67.1)	25.1 (77.2)	26.8 (80.2)	24.8 (76.6)	18.0 (64.4)	10.4 (50.7)	2.1 (35.8)	−4.0 (24.8)	11.0 (51.8)
Mean daily minimum °C (°F)	−9.4 (15.1)	−7.5 (18.5)	−0.6 (30.9)	6.3 (43.3)	11.5 (52.7)	16.6 (61.9)	18.3 (64.9)	15.7 (60.3)	9.2 (48.6)	3.0 (37.4)	−2.8 (27.0)	−8.0 (17.6)	4.4 (39.9)
Average precipitation mm (inches)	21.3 (0.84)	23.8 (0.94)	26.8 (1.06)	33.7 (1.33)	23.7 (0.93)	12.9 (0.51)	10.9 (0.43)	3.1 (0.12)	4.7 (0.19)	17.3 (0.68)	24.7 (0.97)	20.2 (0.80)	223.1 (8.78)
Average precipitation days (≥ 1.0 mm)	4.7	4.9	4.8	5.0	4.2	2.3	1.7	0.7	0.7	2.8	4.4	3.8	40.0
Source: NOAA
