= Lugovaya =

Lugovaya (Луговая) is a frequent East Slavic toponym, from the adjective лугово́й "meadowy" (pertaining to луг "meadow"). There are numerous villages, rivers, streets (Луговая улица), train stations and airfields with this name in Russia, Belarus and Ukraine.

- Lugovaya River, a tributary of the Vuoksi River
- Saint Petersburg has several streets called Lugova ulitsa (Луговая улица):
  - former name Zosimova street (Улица Зосимова) in Kronstadt
  - a street in Lakhta, Saint Petersburg
  - a street in Torikka, Saint Petersburg
  - two streets in Sestroretsk, numbered 1-я Луговая улица and 2-я Луговая улица.
- an airfield named for Lugovoy, a town in Turar Ryskulov District, Kazakhstan
- Lugovaya, Gafuriysky District, Republic of Bashkortostan
