= Kostobe =

Medieval archaeological site in Jambyl Region, Kazakhstan

Coordinates: 42°59′21″N 71°31′24″E

- Jamukat (Dzhamukat)
- Interactive map of Kostobe
- Type: Archaeological site
- Periods: Early Middle Ages to High Middle Ages
- Cultures: Sogdian, Turkic
- Satellite of: Western Turkic Khaganate
- Location: Jambyl Region, Kazakhstan
- Region: Talas Valley
- Part of: Silk Roads: the Routes Network of Chang'an–Tianshan Corridor

History
- Built: 6th century
- Built by: Sogdian settlers
- Abandoned: 13th century

Site notes
- Excavation dates: 1938
- Archaeologists: Alexander Bernshtam
- Condition: Ruins
- Public access: Yes

UNESCO World Heritage Site
- Official name: Silk Roads: the Routes Network of Chang'an–Tianshan Corridor
- Type: Cultural
- Criteria: (ii), (iii), (v), (vi)
- Designated: 2014

Kostobe is an archaeological site in the Jambyl Region of Kazakhstan, on the right bank of the Talas River, about 15 kilometres from Taraz. Researchers equate it with the medieval town of Jamukat (also spelled Dzhamukat), a 6th-century foundation that lasted into the 12th century. It is one of eight Kazakh components of the Silk Roads: the Routes Network of Chang'an-Tianshan Corridor, inscribed as a World Heritage Site in 2014.

Medieval sources say Sogdian merchants from Bukhara asked the Turkic Khagan for land in the Talas valley and named the settlement after their leader Jamukha. Al-Muqaddasi, writing in the 10th century, noted it among the towns of the region. The Mongols destroyed the town in the 13th century.

The walled centre of the site is roughly 420 by 450 metres, with double walls, towers, and a double moat. Alexander Bernshtam excavated Kostobe in 1938, recovering coins and ceramics spanning the 6th to 12th centuries. Later work turned up a palace built of adobe and pahsa (rammed earth), a sanctuary with carved terracotta walls, and what may be a Zoroastrian fire temple. Among the smaller finds are silver jewellery, bronze earrings, a silver cross, and a small Buddhist figure.
