= Shabakty =

River in Kazakhstan

Shabakty Шабақты
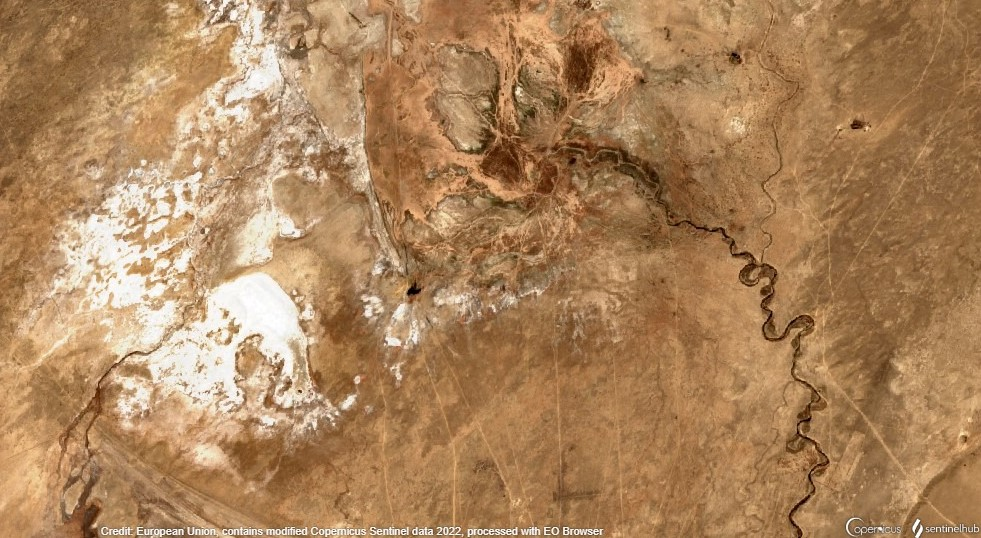
- Last stretch of the Shabakty with the river flowing into the salt lake area. Sentinel-2 image

- Mouth location in Kazakhstan

Location
- Country: Kazakhstan

Physical characteristics
- Source: Karatau
  - coordinates: 43°19′04″N 69°52′54″E
- Mouth: Akzhar
  - coordinates: 43°50′25″N 69°46′42″E
- Length: 164 km (102 mi)
- Basin size: 1,290 km^{2} (500 sq mi)
- Discharge
  - average: 2.8 m^{3}/s (99 cu ft/s)

The Shabakty (Kazakh: Шабақты; Russian: Шабакты) is a river in southern Kazakhstan. It has a length of 164 km (102 mi) and a drainage basin of 1,290 km^{2} (500 sq mi).

== Course ==
The river flows across the Sarysu District of the Zhambyl Region. There are two inhabited places by the riverbank, Saudakent near the mouth and Aktogay in the upper course. The water from the river is used by local households and for irrigating crops.

The Shabakty river has its origin in a spring of the northern slopes of the Karatau Range. It heads roughly northwestwards down a canyon with steep sides. The bottom of the river channel is pebbly and the water is fresh and clean. In its final stretch its valley widens and the river bends and flows roughly northwards, parallel to the Ushbas river to the west. Finally the Shabakty ends up in the southeastern shore of Akzhar lake. The river is sustained mainly by rain, snow and groundwater. In the summer, when the riverbed dries, the river doesn't reach the salt lake cluster.

The 95 km (59 mi) long Kyrshabakty (Қыршабақты), also known as Bogen (Kazakh: Бөген), from the right and the 58 km (36 mi) long Burkittі (Бүркітті), joining it from the left, are the main tributaries of the Shabakty.

== See also ==
- List of rivers of Kazakhstan
