= Kyrshabakty =

River in Kazakhstan

Kyrshabakty Қыршабақты
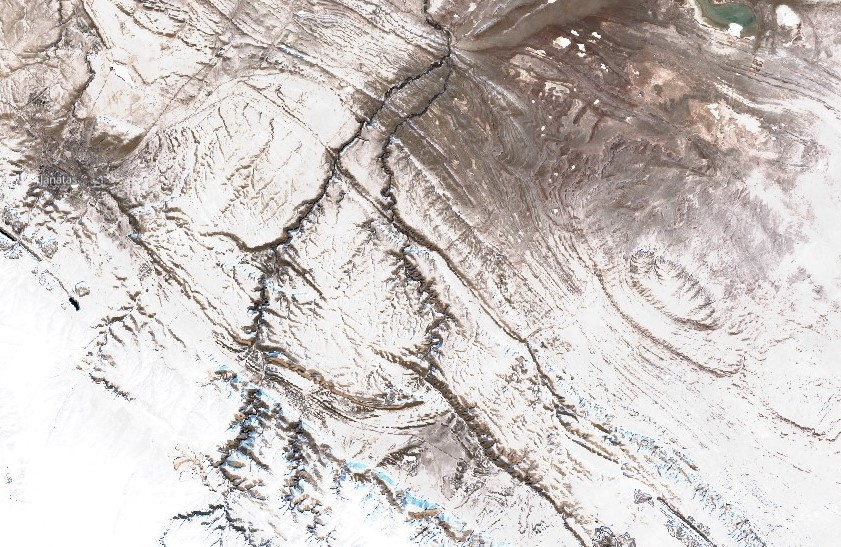
- Northern slopes of the Karatau Range in the winter with the gorges of rivers Shabakty and Kyrshabakty and their confluence at the top.

- Mouth location in Kazakhstan

Location
- Country: Kazakhstan

Physical characteristics
- Source: Karatau Range
- Mouth: Shabakty
  - coordinates: 43°50′25″N 69°46′42″E
- Length: 95 km (59 mi)
- Basin size: 805 km^{2} (311 sq mi)

The Kyrshabakty (Kazakh: Қыршабақты) is a river in southern Kazakhstan. It is a right tributary of the Shabakty, with a length of 95 km (59 mi) and a drainage basin of 805 km^{2} (311 sq mi).

The river flows across Sarysu District of the Zhambyl Region. There are Cambrian limestones by the river that contain a rich variety of trilobites fossils.

== Course ==
The Kyrshabakty river has its source in springs located in the northern slopes of the Karatau Range, near Baizhansai village. Its upper stretch is also known as Bogen (Kazakh: Бөген) and heads roughly northwestwards. Midway along its course it bends northwards. The river flows within a gorge, often with steep sides, all along. Finally the Kyrshabakty ends up in the right bank of the Shabakty, not far from Shabakty Railway Junction.

There is water in the river all year round.

== See also ==
- List of rivers of Kazakhstan
