= Ulken Kamkaly =

Lake in Kazakhstan

- Улкен Қамқалы
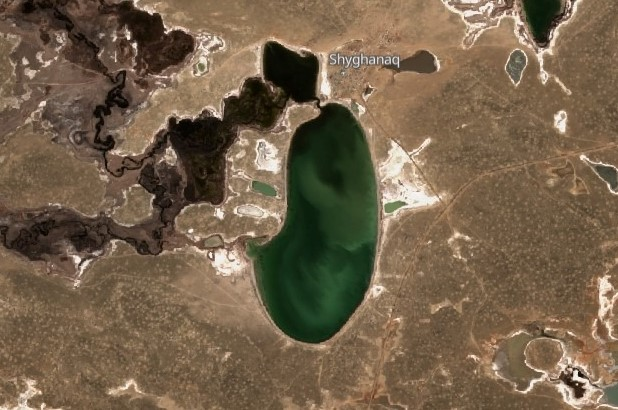
- Sentinel-2 image of the lakes in March

- Location within Kazakhstan
- Location: Sarysu District
- Coordinates: 44°48′35″N 69°5′56″E
- Basin countries: Kazakhstan
- Max. length: 3.3 kilometers (2.1 mi)
- Max. width: 1.4 kilometers (0.87 mi)
- Surface area: 4.2 square kilometers (1.6 sq mi)
- Residence time: UTC+6
- Islands: no
- Settlements: Shyganak

Ulken Kamkaly (Note: Kazakh: Үлкен Қамқалы, romanized: Ülken Qamqaly, pronounced [ʉlkʰɵ́n qʰɑmqʰɑɫə́]) or Bolshoi Kamkaly (Note: Russian: Большой Камкалы, romanized: Boljšoj Kamkaly, pronounced [bɐlʲˈʂoj kəmkɐˈlɨ]) is a lake in the Sarysu District, Jambyl Region, Kazakhstan.

Shyganak village is located by the northern end of the lakeshore and Zhailaukol village 33 kilometers (21 mi) to the east. There is fishing in the lake.

== Geography ==
Ulken Kamkaly lies at the northern edge of the Moiynkum Desert, in the lower Chu river basin. It is located less than 1.5 kilometers (0.93 mi) to the south of the Chu river channel. To the northwest lies smaller lake Kishi Kamkaly. A narrow sound at the northern tip connects both lakes. There are other smaller lakes scattered in the area, such as Shortankol 6 kilometers (3.7 mi) to the WSW and Sorasha 25 kilometers (16 mi) to the WNW. Ulken Kamkaly freezes in the winter and the ice thaws by March.

== See also ==
- List of lakes of Kazakhstan
