= Aktogay =

Aktogay (Kazakh: Ақтоғай) may refer to following localities in Kazakhstan:

- Aktogay District, Karaganda Region
  - Aktogay, Karaganda Region, the district capital
- Aktogay District, Pavlodar Region
  - Aktogay, Pavlodar Region, the district capital
- Aktogay, East Kazakhstan Region, an urban-type settlement and railway junction
- Aktogay, Almaty Region, a village
- Aktogay, Atyrau Region, a village
- Aktogay, Sarysu District, Jambyl Region, a village
