= Tole Bi, Shu District =

Töle Bi Төле би
- Location in Kazakhstan
- Coordinates: 43°40′36.51″N 73°45′43.22″E
- Country: Kazakhstan
- Region: Jambyl Region
- Elevation: 610 m (2,000 ft)

Population (2009)
  - Total: 19
- Time zone: UTC+6
- Postal code: 080001 - 080019
- Area code: +7 726 38
- Vehicle registration: H, 08
- Website: www.shu.zhambyl.kz

Töle Bi (Kazakh: Төле би; before 1992 Novotroitskoe) is a village in Kazakhstan, the administrative center of Shu District, Jambyl Region. It is also the administrative center of the Töle Bi rural district (KATO code — 316630100).

== Geography ==
The village is located about 7 kilometers (4.3 mi) north of Shu city.

=== Climate ===
Climate data for Töle Bi (1991–2020)
Month	Jan	Feb	Mar	Apr	May	Jun	Jul	Aug	Sep	Oct	Nov	Dec	Year
Mean daily maximum °C (°F)	−0.9 (30.4)	2.9 (37.2)	12.8 (55.0)	21.1 (70.0)	26.8 (80.2)	32.2 (90.0)	34.2 (93.6)	33.0 (91.4)	27.5 (81.5)	19.6 (67.3)	9.3 (48.7)	1.0 (33.8)	18.3 (64.9)
Daily mean °C (°F)	−6.5 (20.3)	−3.3 (26.1)	5.2 (41.4)	13.2 (55.8)	18.7 (65.7)	23.8 (74.8)	25.6 (78.1)	23.9 (75.0)	18.0 (64.4)	10.4 (50.7)	2.1 (35.8)	−4.6 (23.7)	10.5 (50.9)
Mean daily minimum °C (°F)	−11.2 (11.8)	−8.2 (17.2)	−0.7 (30.7)	6.4 (43.5)	11.0 (51.8)	15.7 (60.3)	17.3 (63.1)	15.5 (59.9)	9.8 (49.6)	3.3 (37.9)	−3.1 (26.4)	−9.0 (15.8)	3.9 (39.0)
Average precipitation mm (inches)	27.2 (1.07)	29.3 (1.15)	26.1 (1.03)	37.7 (1.48)	31.7 (1.25)	23.8 (0.94)	15.6 (0.61)	10.6 (0.42)	10.1 (0.40)	30.3 (1.19)	35.2 (1.39)	31.6 (1.24)	309.2 (12.17)
Average precipitation days (≥ 1.0 mm)	6.0	6.5	5.8	6.6	5.8	4.2	3.0	2.0	1.6	4.2	6.2	6.6	58.5
Source: NOAA
