= Jualy District =

Coordinates: 42.674°N 70.72°E

Jualy Жуалы
- District
- Жуалы ауданы
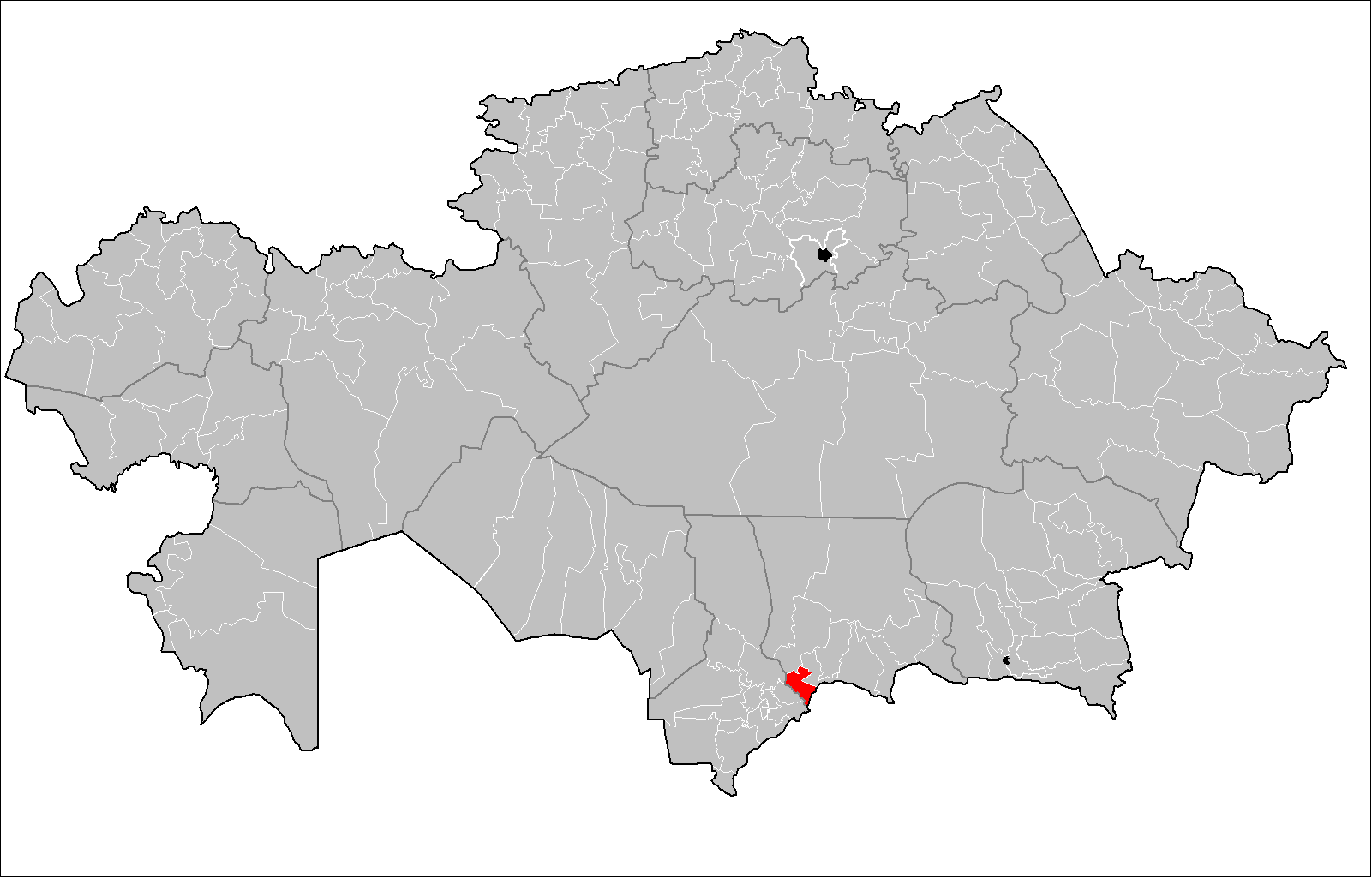
- Location of Jualy District in Kazakhstan
- Country: Kazakhstan
- Region: Jambyl Region
- Administrative center: Bauyrzhan Momyshuly

Government
  - Akim: Murtaza Jalgas

Population (2013)
  - Total: 51,781
- Time zone: UTC+6 (East)

Jualy (Kazakh: Жуалы ауданы, Jualy audany) is a district of Jambyl Region in south-eastern Kazakhstan. The administrative center of the district is the auyl of Bauyrzhan Momyshuly.
