= Kulan, Kazakhstan =

Village

- Coordinates: 42.910°N 72.715°E
- Zip code: 080900
- Phone: +772631

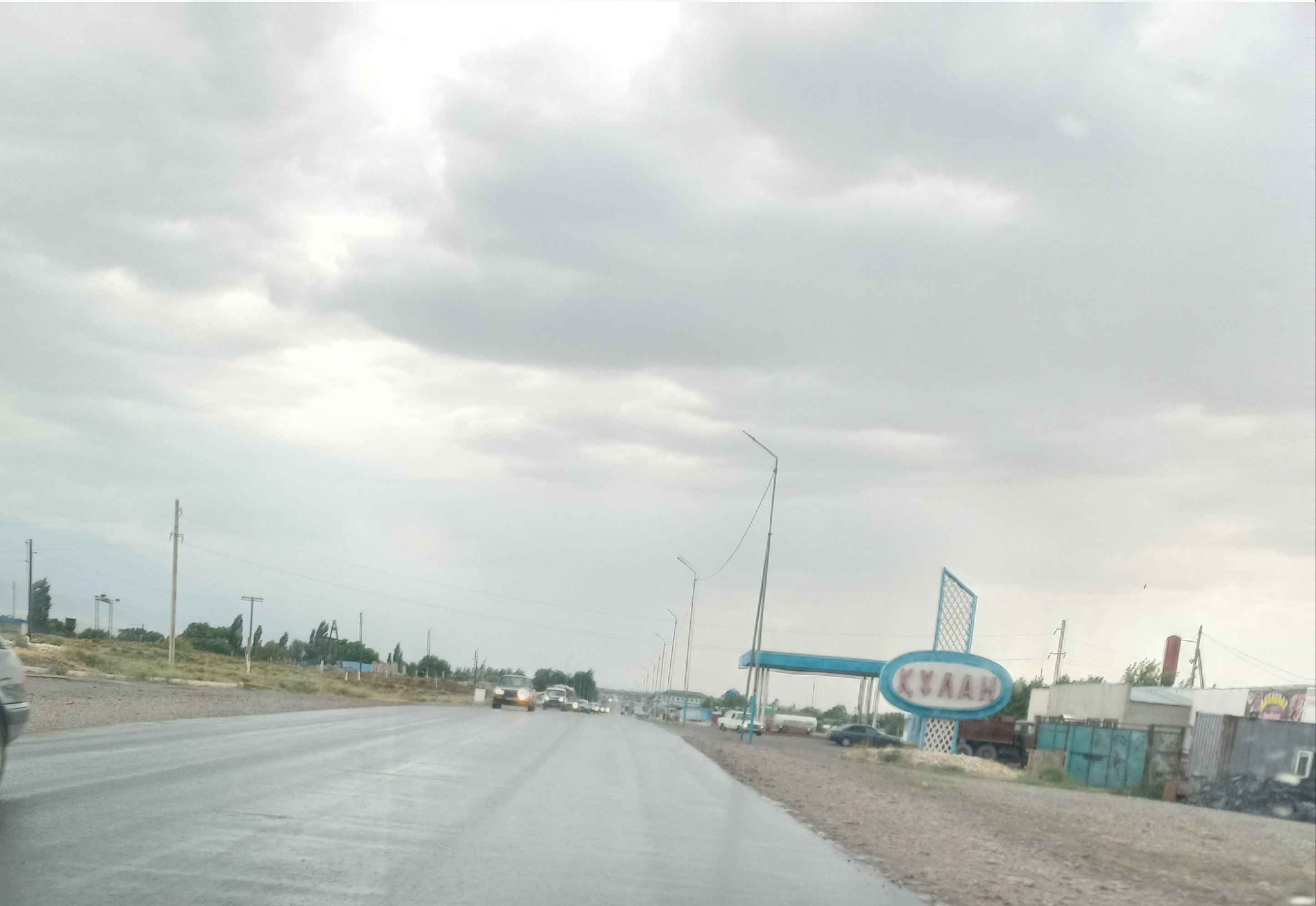

Kulan (Kazakh: Құлан, Qūlan), named Lugovoe (Russian: Луговое) until 1992, is a small town that is the administrative centre of the Turar Ryskulov District of the Jambyl Region of Kazakhstan.

The train station in Kulan is located along the route that connects Taraz, Bishkek and Shu.

On 23 May 2003, Kulan was at the epicentre of an earthquake that was estimated at 6.5–7.0 on the Richter scale.

Famous Ukrainian boxers Wadimir Klitschko and Vitali Klitschko lived and studied at a school in Kulan as they were kids.

== Climate ==
Climate data for Kulan (1991–2020)
Month	Jan	Feb	Mar	Apr	May	Jun	Jul	Aug	Sep	Oct	Nov	Dec	Year
Mean daily maximum °C (°F)	0.7 (33.3)	3.3 (37.9)	11.2 (52.2)	18.7 (65.7)	24.2 (75.6)	30.0 (86.0)	32.7 (90.9)	31.7 (89.1)	26.0 (78.8)	18.2 (64.8)	9.2 (48.6)	2.3 (36.1)	17.4 (63.3)
Daily mean °C (°F)	−4.7 (23.5)	−2.3 (27.9)	4.9 (40.8)	11.9 (53.4)	17.3 (63.1)	22.7 (72.9)	25.1 (77.2)	23.5 (74.3)	17.5 (63.5)	10.2 (50.4)	2.7 (36.9)	−3.3 (26.1)	10.5 (50.9)
Mean daily minimum °C (°F)	−9.1 (15.6)	−6.7 (19.9)	−0.1 (31.8)	5.9 (42.6)	10.3 (50.5)	14.7 (58.5)	16.7 (62.1)	14.9 (58.8)	9.5 (49.1)	3.6 (38.5)	−2.2 (28.0)	−7.5 (18.5)	4.2 (39.6)
Average precipitation mm (inches)	22.2 (0.87)	29.1 (1.15)	32.7 (1.29)	50.2 (1.98)	42.8 (1.69)	24.6 (0.97)	17.2 (0.68)	11.7 (0.46)	13.4 (0.53)	29.7 (1.17)	35.9 (1.41)	28.9 (1.14)	338.4 (13.32)
Average precipitation days (≥ 1.0 mm)	5.5	6.6	6.9	8.2	6.9	4.9	3.5	1.9	2.1	4.4	5.8	6.6	63.3
Source: NOAA

== Gallery ==
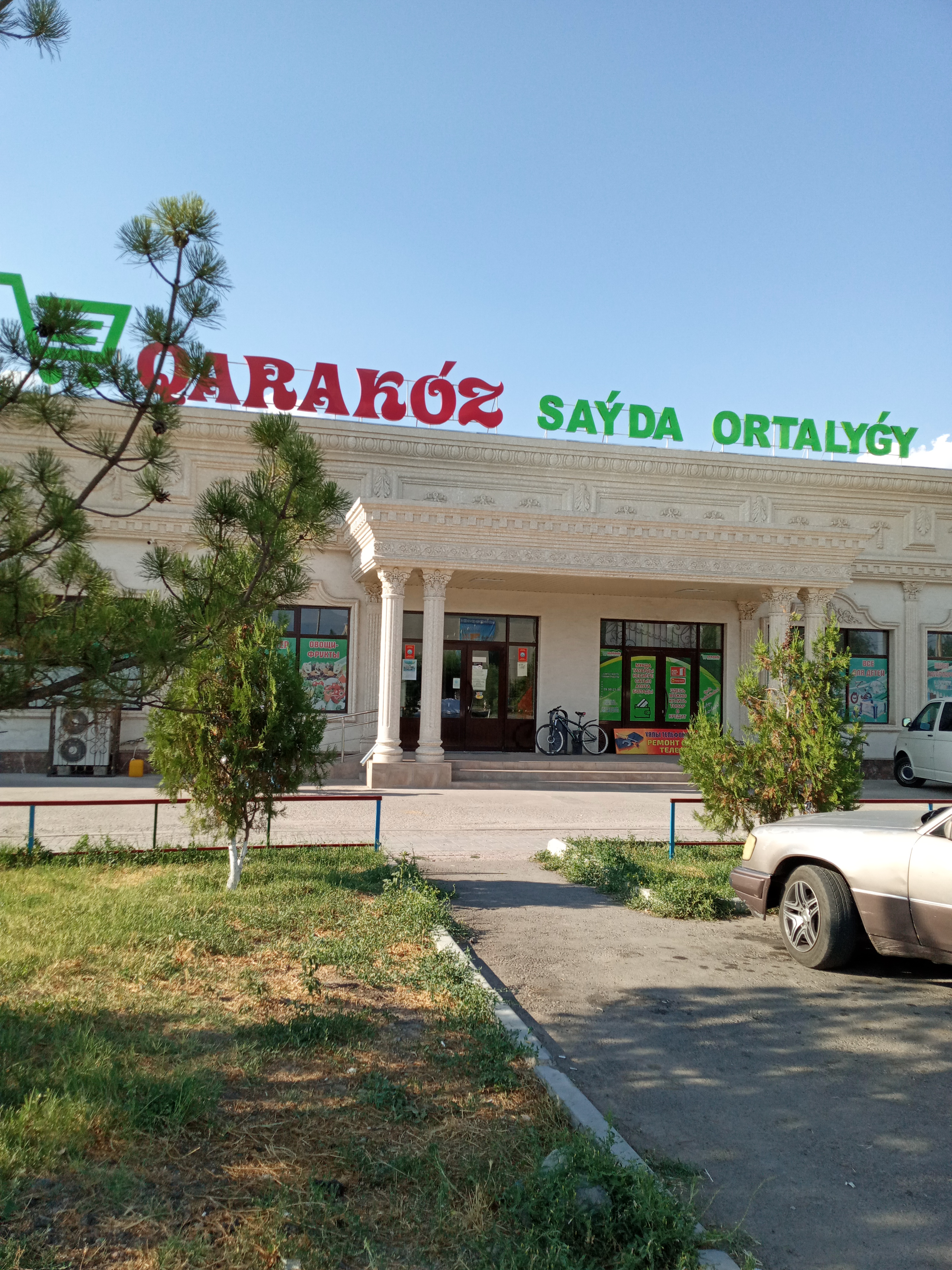

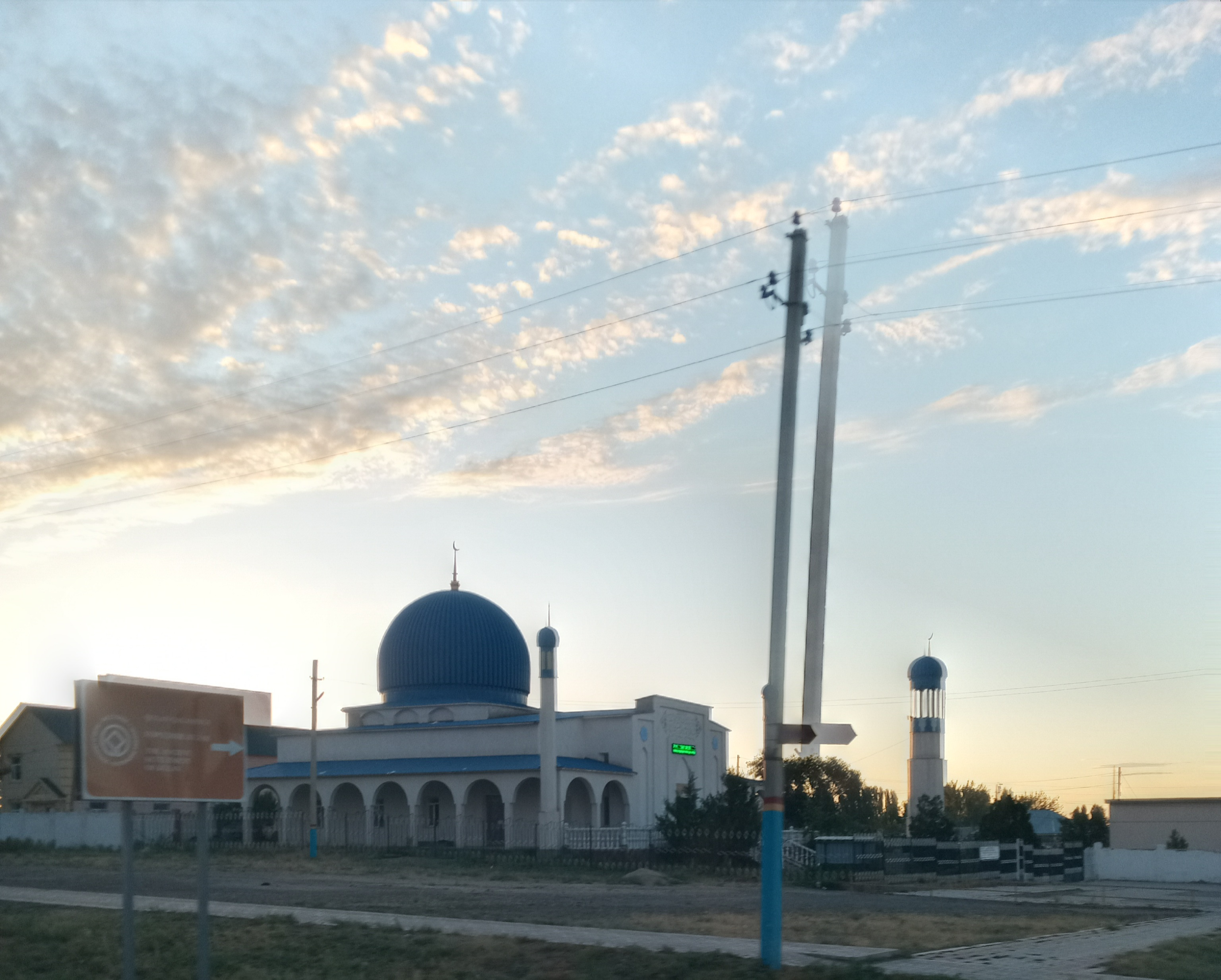
