= Karatau Nature Reserve =

Wildlife refuge in Kazakhstan

- IUCN category Ia (strict nature reserve)
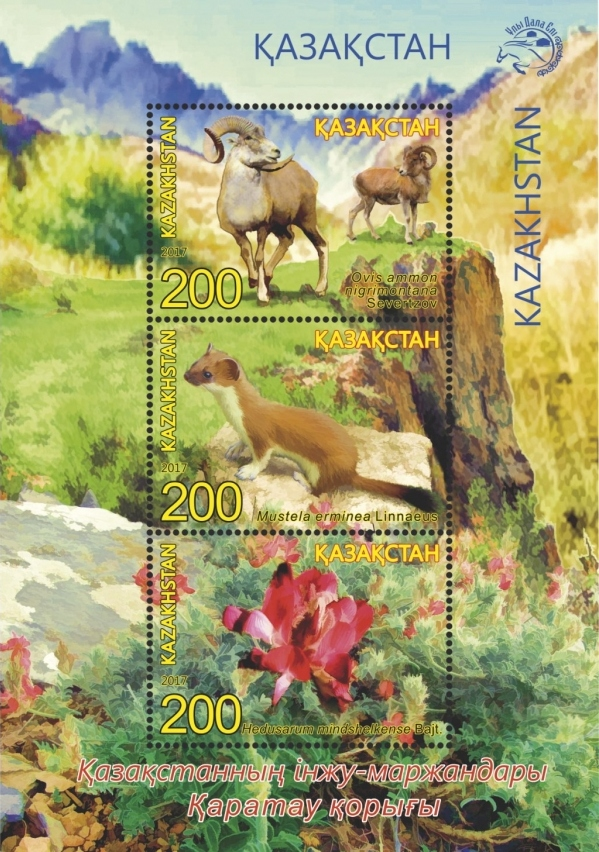
- 2017 stamp sheet of Kazakhstan dedicated to the Karatau Nature Reserve

- Location within Kazakhstan
- Location: South Kazakhstan Region, Kazakhstan
- Nearest city: Kentau
- Coordinates: 43°43′0″N 68°44′0″E
- Area: 34 300 ha
- Established: 2004
- Governing body: Forestry and Wildlife Committee Ministry of Ecology, Geology and Natural Resources of the Republic of Kazakhstan
- Website: karatau-gpz.kz

Karatau Nature Reserve (Kazakh: Қаратау мемлекеттік табиғи қорығы, Qaratau memlekettık tabiği qoryğy) is a wildlife refuge in the mid-part of the Karatau Mountains, near Kyzylkum, Betpak-Dala and Moiynkum deserts in the South Kazakhstan Region of Kazakhstan, in Central Asia.

It was founded in 2004. Its territory is around 34 300 ha. Some 700 species of plants constitute its flora, 62 species are endemic. Its fauna includes, among others, the Kara Tau argali, Indian crested porcupine and beech marten. There are 118 bird species in the area.
