= Shu District =

Coordinates: 43°48′N 73°39′E

Shu Шу ауданы
- District
- Шу ауданы
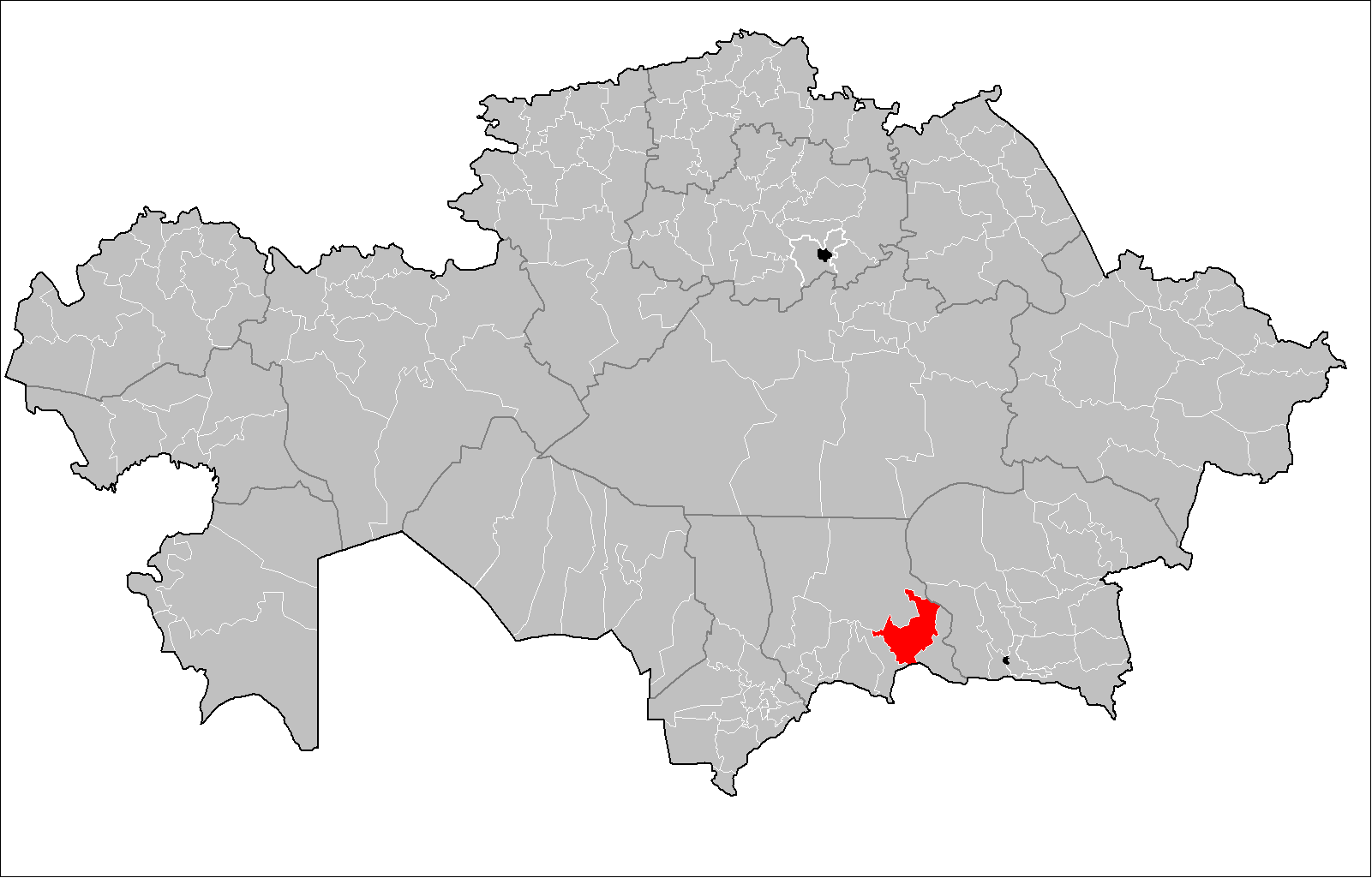
- Location of Shu District in Kazakhstan
- Country: Kazakhstan
- Region: Jambyl Region
- Administrative center: Tole bi

Government
  - Akim: Arubaev Saken Kalanovich

Population (2013)
  - Total: 96,725
- Time zone: UTC+6 (East)
- Website: http://shu.zhambyl.kz/index.php?lan=kaz

Shu (Kazakh: Шу ауданы, Şu audany) is a district of Jambyl Region in south-eastern Kazakhstan. The administrative center of the district is the auyl of Tole bi.
