= Bauyrzhan Momyshuly, Kazakhstan =

Bauyrjan Momyshuly Бауыржан Момышұлы
- village
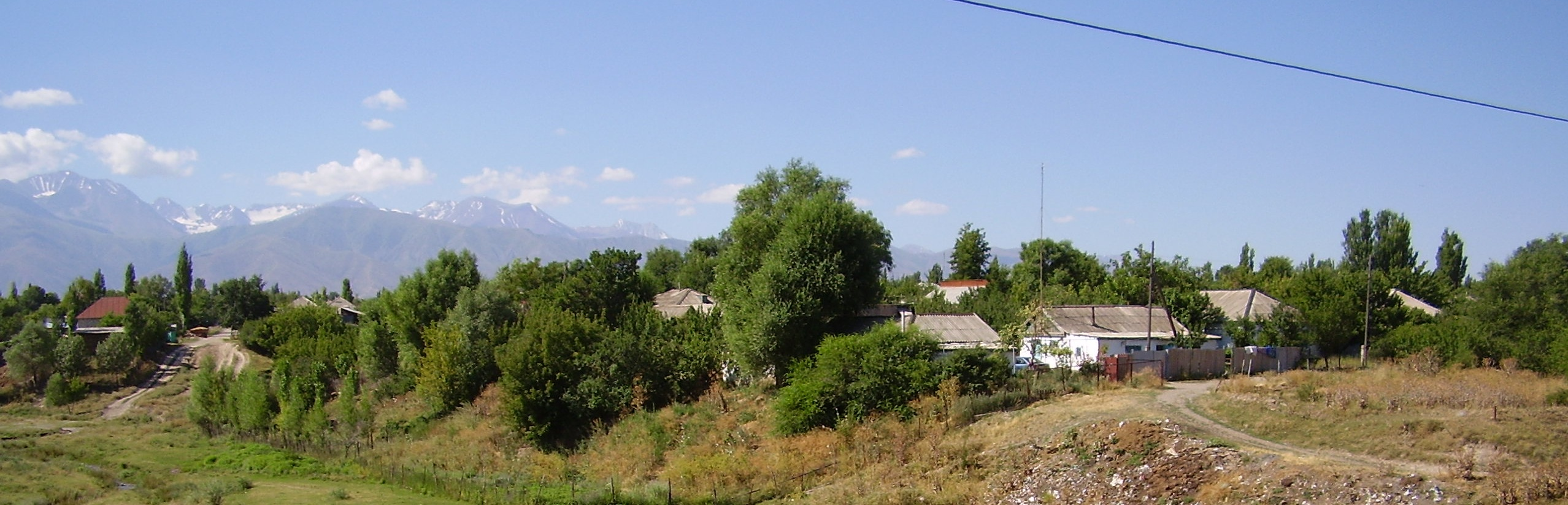

- Location within Kazakhstan
- Coordinates: 42°37′08″N 70°45′35″E
- Country: Kazakhstan
- Region: Jambyl Region
- District: Jualy District

Population (2009)
  - Total: 12,491
- Time zone: UTC+7

Bauyrjan Momyshuly (Kazakh: Бауыржан Момышұлы) is an auyl in southeastern Kazakhstan. It is the seat of Jualy District of Jambyl Region. It is named after the military officer and author of the same name. The population is 12,491 (2009 census results).
