= Asy, Kazakhstan =

Asa
- village
- Location within Kazakhstan
- Coordinates: 43°2′13″N 71°8′27″E
- Country: Kazakhstan
- Region: Jambyl Region
- District: Jambyl District

Population (2009)
  - Total: 8,640
- Time zone: UTC+7

Asa (Kazakh: Аса, Asa) is a village in southeastern Kazakhstan. It is the seat of Jambyl District of Jambyl Region. Population: 8,640 (2009 census results).
