= Shyganak, Sarysu District =

Shyganak Шығанақ
- Village
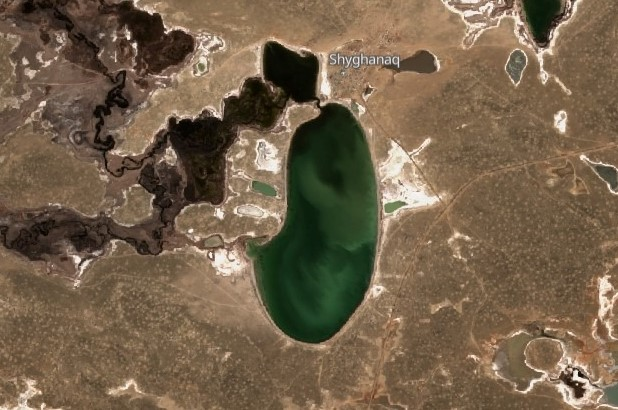
- Shyganak village and lakes Ulken Kamkaly and Kishi Kamkaly Sentinel-2 image

- Location in Kazakhstan
- Coordinates: 44°49′43″N 70°00′19″E
- Country: Kazakhstan
- Region: Jambyl Region
- District: Sarysu District

Population (2009)
  - Total: 436
- Time zone: UTC+6 (East Kazakhstan Time)
- Post code: 080714

Shyganak (Kazakh: Шығанақ) is a village in Sarysu District, Jambyl Region, Kazakhstan. It is the administrative center of the Kamkala rural district. (KATO code - 316039100). Population: 436 (2009 census results); 902 (1999 census results).

== Geography ==
The village lies on the lower course of the Chu river. It is located at the northern end of lake Ulken Kamkaly by the eastern shore of lake Kishi Kamkaly, 140 kilometers (87 mi) to the northeast of Zhanatas, the district capital.

=== Climate ===
Climate data for Shyganak (1991–2020)
Month	Jan	Feb	Mar	Apr	May	Jun	Jul	Aug	Sep	Oct	Nov	Dec	Year
Mean daily maximum °C (°F)	−6.0 (21.2)	−2.9 (26.8)	6.7 (44.1)	18.2 (64.8)	25.3 (77.5)	30.8 (87.4)	32.3 (90.1)	30.6 (87.1)	24.0 (75.2)	15.7 (60.3)	5.2 (41.4)	−3.2 (26.2)	14.7 (58.5)
Daily mean °C (°F)	−10.7 (12.7)	−8.0 (17.6)	0.8 (33.4)	11.8 (53.2)	18.8 (65.8)	24.4 (75.9)	26.0 (78.8)	24.1 (75.4)	17.3 (63.1)	9.2 (48.6)	0.2 (32.4)	−7.3 (18.9)	8.9 (48.0)
Mean daily minimum °C (°F)	−14.6 (5.7)	−12.2 (10.0)	−3.8 (25.2)	6.0 (42.8)	12.4 (54.3)	17.8 (64.0)	19.6 (67.3)	17.5 (63.5)	10.8 (51.4)	3.8 (38.8)	−3.7 (25.3)	−10.9 (12.4)	3.6 (38.5)
Average precipitation mm (inches)	9.9 (0.39)	10.3 (0.41)	11.0 (0.43)	14.6 (0.57)	14.0 (0.55)	11.8 (0.46)	10.5 (0.41)	4.5 (0.18)	5.3 (0.21)	10.3 (0.41)	13.2 (0.52)	11.3 (0.44)	126.7 (4.99)
Average precipitation days (≥ 1.0 mm)	3.0	3.1	2.9	3.6	3.1	2.5	2.4	1.0	1.4	2.5	3.5	2.8	31.8
Source: NOAA
