= Talas River =

River in Kyrgyzstan and Kazakhstan

Talas Талас
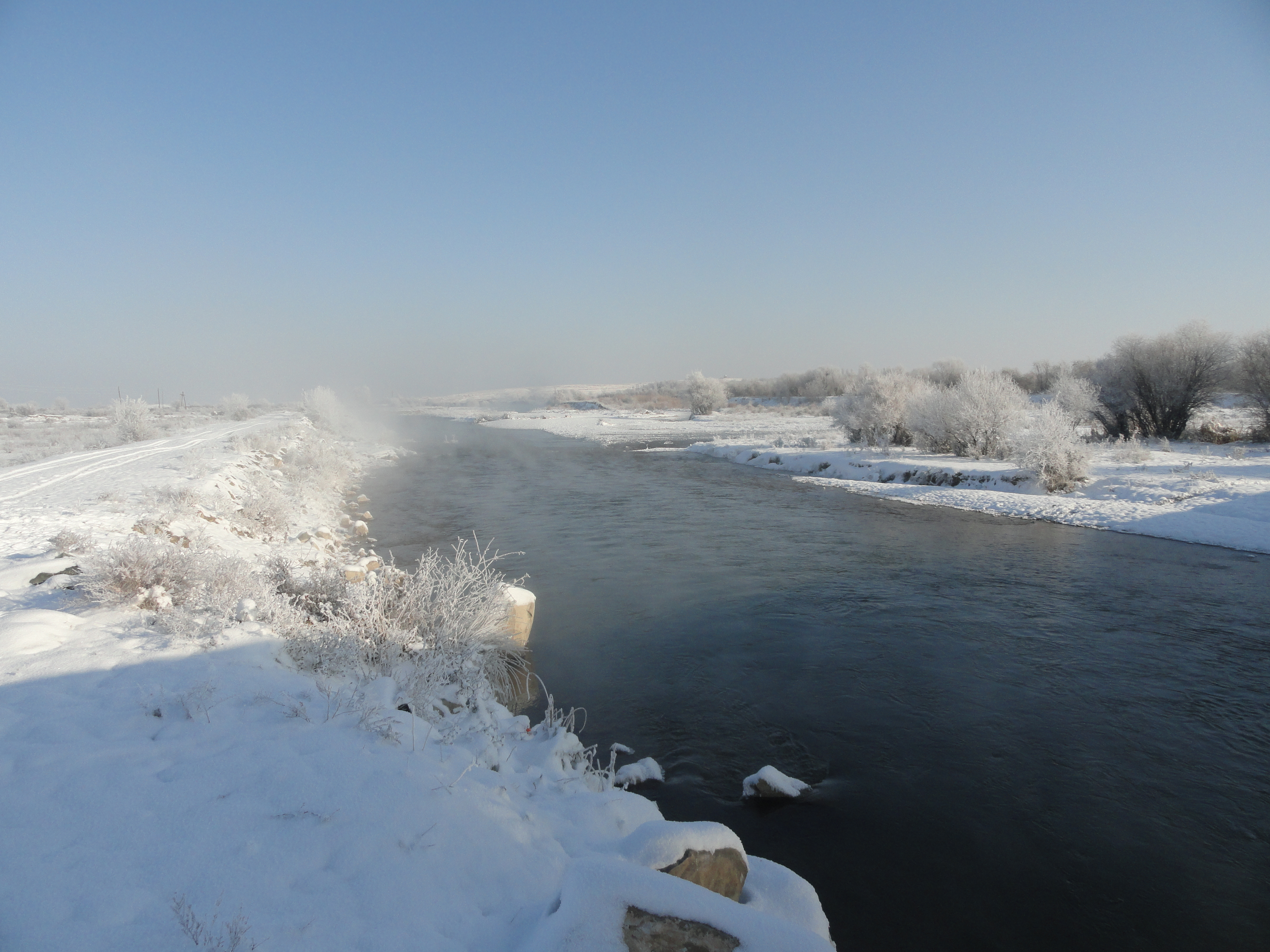
- Talas River near Taraz

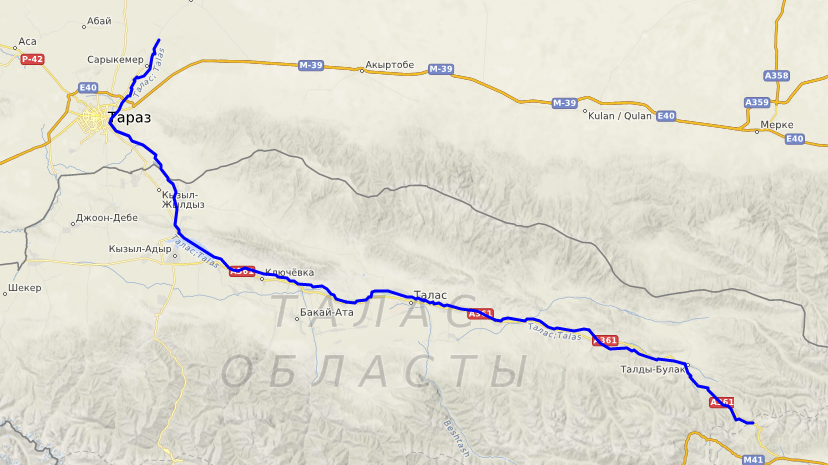
- Course of the Talas

Location
- Country: Kyrgyzstan, Kazakhstan

Physical characteristics
- Source
  - location: confluence of the Karakol and Uch-Koshoy
  - coordinates: 42.4902°N 72.567°E
  - elevation: 1,497 m (4,911 ft)
- Mouth: Muyunkum Desert
  - location: Akzhar lakes
  - coordinates: 44.0600°N 69.6600°E
  - elevation: 300 m (980 ft)
- Length: 661 km (411 mi)
- Basin size: 52,700 km^{2} (20,300 sq mi)

The Talas (/təˈlɑːs/; Kazakh and Kyrgyz: [tʰɑɫɑ́s]) is a river which rises in the Talas Region of Kyrgyzstan and flows west into the Jambyl Region of Kazakhstan. The river is 661 kilometres (411 mi) long and has a basin area of 52,700 square kilometres (20,300 mi^{2}).

== Course ==
It is formed from the confluence of the Karakol and the Uch-Koshoy and flows roughly west and northwest. It runs through the city of Taraz in Zhambyl Province of Kazakhstan and vanishes in the Muyunkum Desert before reaching Lake Aydyn.

The Ili, Chu and Talas are three steppe rivers that flow west and then north-west. The Ili rises in Xinjiang, flows west to a point north of Lake Issyk Kul and then turns north-west to reach Lake Balkash. The Chu rises west of Lake Issyk Kul, flows out into the steppe and dries up before reaching the Syr Darya. The Talas starts west and south of the Chu, flows west and north-west, but dries up before reaching the Chu.

== History ==
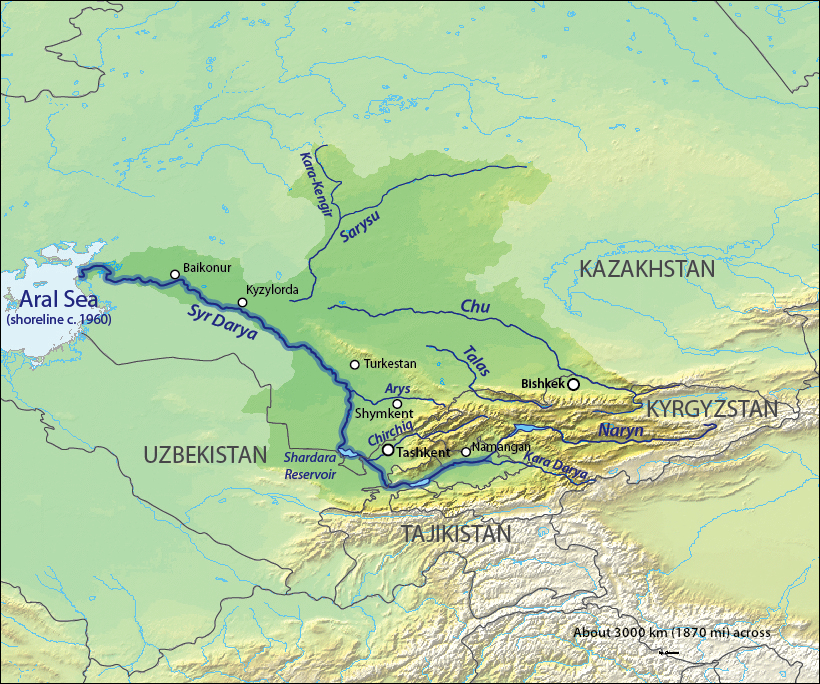
Talas River in the Syr Darya basin

During the Battle of Talas (named after the river) in 751, the Abbasid force defeated the Tang Chinese forces led by the General Gao Xianzhi over a dispute regarding a client kingdom in the Fergana Valley. The battle was won by the Abbasids after the Karluks defected.

The Chinese monk Xuanzang arrived from the Chui river to Talas during one of his journeys.
