= Janatas =

Janatas Жаңатас Жанатас
- Town
- Location in Jambyl Province, Kazakhstan
- Coordinates: 43°34′13.81″N 69°44′0.61″E
- Country: Kazakhstan
- Region: Jambyl Region
- District: Sarysu District
- Settlement: 1964

Population (2009)
  - Total: 20,731
- Time zone: UTC+6 (East)
  - Summer (DST): UTC+6 (not observed)

Janatas (Note: Kazakh: Жаңатас, romanized: Jañatas, pronounced [ʒɑŋɑtʰɑ́s]; Russian: Жанатас, romanized: Žanatas, pronounced [ʐənɐˈtas]) is a town in Sarysu District of Jambyl Region of southern Kazakhstan. The name means 'New Stone' in Kazakh, referring to the newly found phosphorite deposits. Janatas serves as the administrative center of the district. Population: 20,731 (2009 census results); 25,927 (1999 census results).

== Geography ==
The town lies north of the Karatau slopes, by the banks of the Burkitti (Бүркітті) river, a left tributary of the Shabakty. Saudakent village is located 25 kilometers (16 mi) to the northeast.

== History ==
Janatas was founded in 1964 as a settlement to serve the phosphorite deposits. In 1969, it was granted town status.

The town was steadily growing until the 1990s, when most industrial enterprises closed down owing to economic hardships, and population started to decline. As of 2013, some of residential areas stand deserted.

== Economy ==
=== Industry ===
As of 2013, the only functioning industrial enterprise in the town is the phosphorite factory.

In May 2024, EuroChem signed an agreement with China National Chemical Engineering Company for the design, construction and commissioning of a chemical complex in Janatas. The combined total investment in the project will be over $1 billion USD, and will involve the construction of a phosphate mining complex, a sulfuric acid facility, and a chemical complex. The planned annual output will exceed over 1 million tonnes of mineral fertilizers and associated industrial products annually. The plant will utilize technology that will enable it to avoid phosphogypsum waste, replacing it with eco-friendly synthetic gypsum and calcium chloride.

=== Transportation ===
Janatas is connected by railway with Taraz as well as with the mine in Solaqqorgan to the north. Kazakhstan Temir Zholy operates limited passenger service between Janataz and Taraz.

There is road access to E40 and further to Taraz and Shymkent.
