= Bayzak District =

Coordinates: 43°25′48″N 71°39′36″E

Bayzak
- District
- Байзақ ауданы
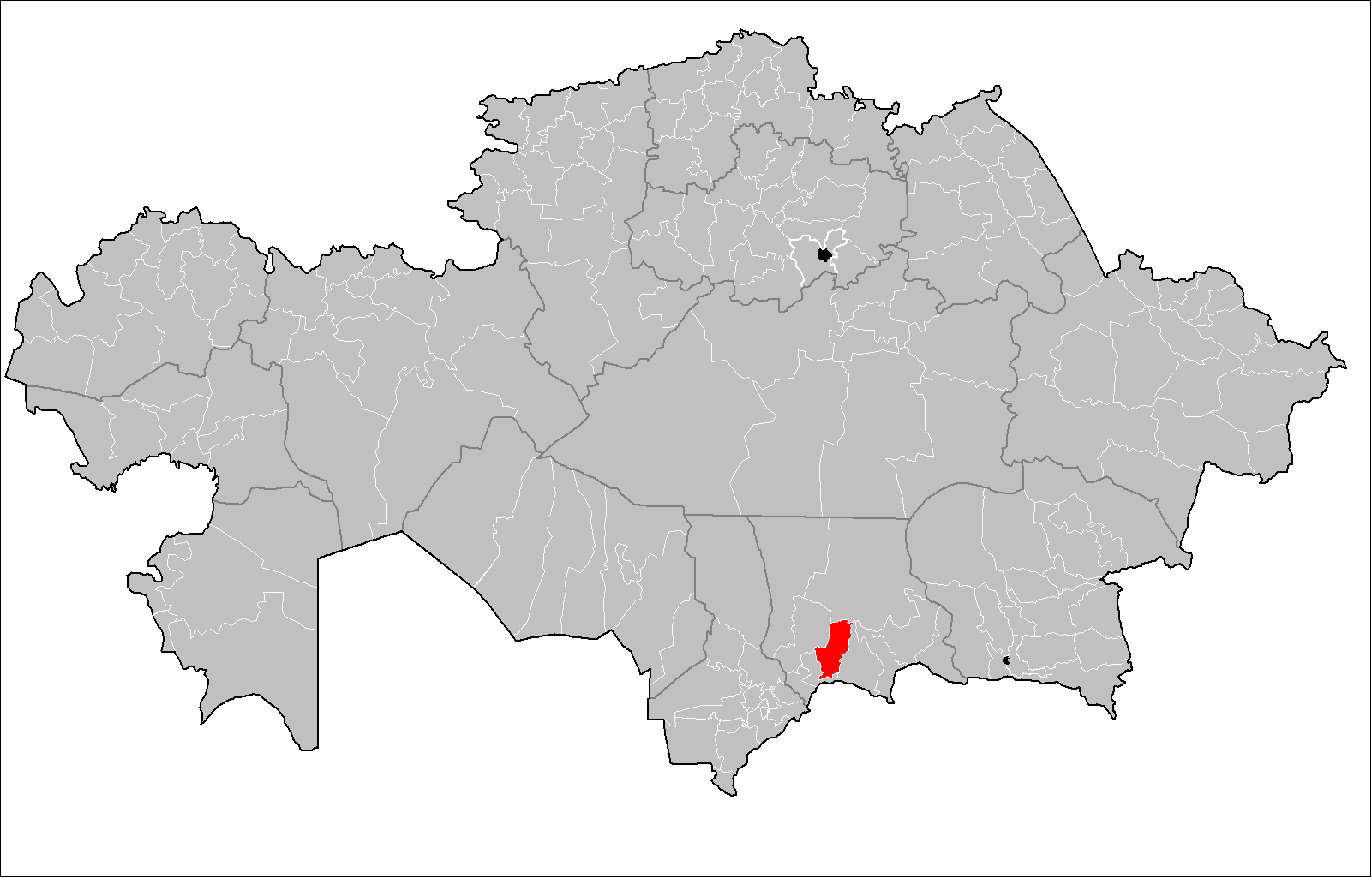
- Location of Bayzak District in Kazakhstan
- Country: Kazakhstan
- Region: Jambyl Region
- Administrative center: Sarykemer

Government
  - Akim: Kazanbasov Bakhyt Alpysbaevich

Population (2013)
  - Total: 93,881
- Time zone: UTC+6 (East)

Bayzak (Kazakh: Байзақ ауданы, Baizaq audany) is a district of Jambyl Region in south-eastern Kazakhstan. The administrative center of the district is the auyl of Sarykemer.

== History ==
The district was formed on February 14, 1938, under the name Sverdlovsk district. In 1995 it was renamed Bayzaksky. At the end of August 2021, explosions in a military unit occurred in this area, causing significant casualties; national mourning was declared.
