= Lugovaya, Gafuriysky District, Republic of Bashkortostan =

Lugovaya Луговая
- Village
- Location within Bashkortostan Location within Russia
- Coordinates: 53°57′N 56°17′E
- Country: Russia
- Region: Bashkortostan
- District: Gafuriysky District
- Time zone: UTC+5:00

Lugovaya (Russian: Луговая) is a rural locality (a village) in Beloozersky Selsoviet, Gafuriysky District, Bashkortostan, Russia. The population was 126 as of 2010. There are 4 streets.

== Geography ==
Lugovaya is located 29 km northwest of Krasnousolsky (the district's administrative centre) by road. Tatarsky Saskul is the nearest rural locality.
