= Sarykemer =

- village
- Location within Kazakhstan
- Coordinates: 43°0′38″N 71°31′2″E
- Country: Kazakhstan
- Region: Jambyl Region
- District: Bayzak District

Population (2009)
  - Total: 24,314
- Time zone: UTC+7

Sarykemer (Kazakh: Сарыкемер, Sarykemer) is an auyl in southeastern Kazakhstan. It is the seat of Bayzak District of Jambyl Region. Population: 24,314 (2009 census results);.
