= Jambyl District, Jambyl =

Coordinates: 42.892°N 71.09°E

Jambyl Жамбыл
- District
- Жамбыл ауданы
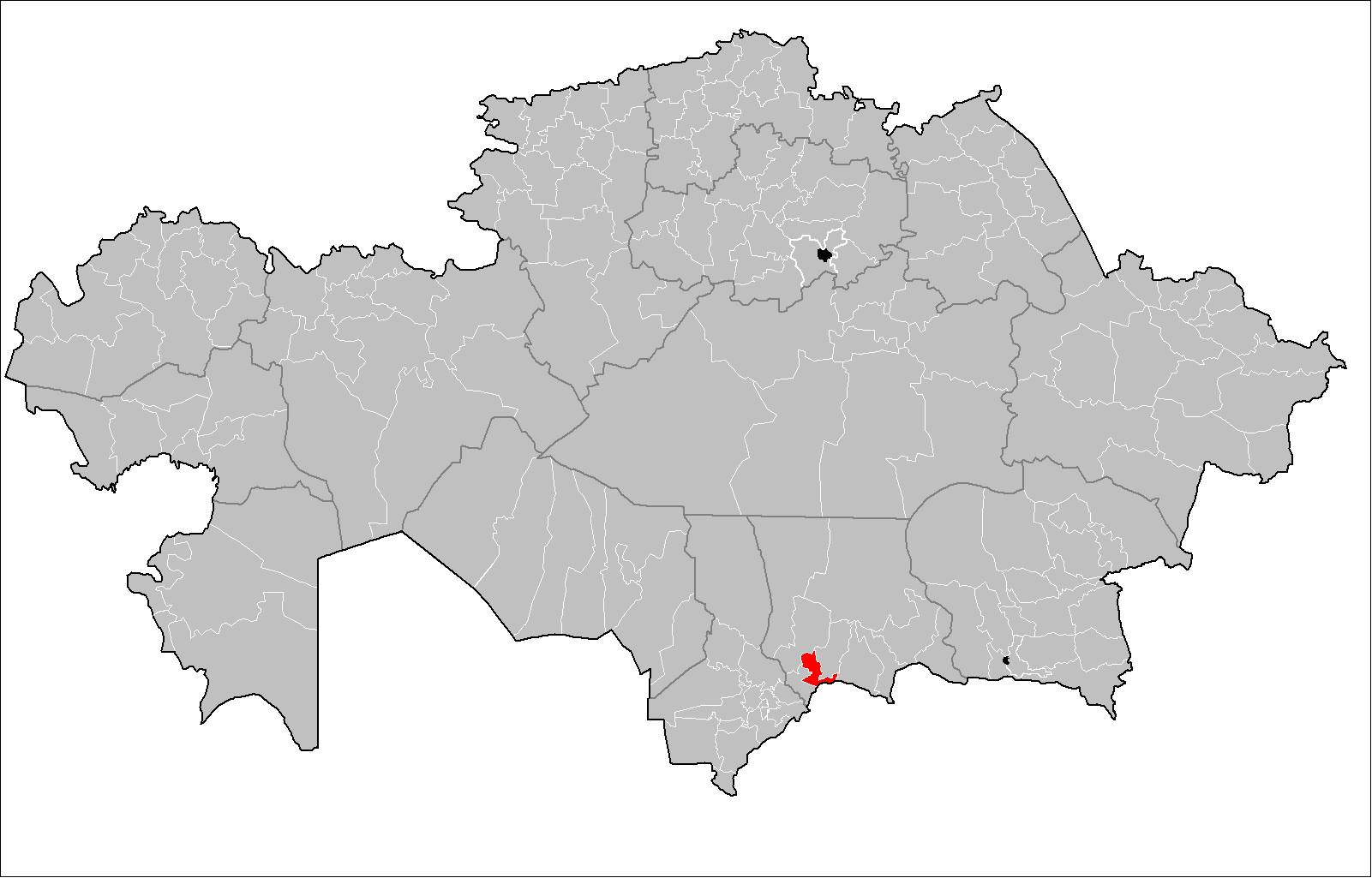
- Location of Jambyl District, Jambyl in Kazakhstan
- Country: Kazakhstan
- Region: Jambyl Region
- Administrative center: Asy

Government
  - Akim: Kydyralyuly Yerlan

Population (2013)
  - Total: 77,711
- Time zone: UTC+6 (East)

Jambyl or Zhambyl (Kazakh: Жамбыл ауданы, Jambyl audany) is a district of Jambyl Region in south-eastern Kazakhstan. The administrative center of the district is the auyl of Asy.
