= Turar Ryskulov District =

Turar Ryskulov Тұрар Рысқұлов
- District
- Тұрар Рысқұлов ауданы
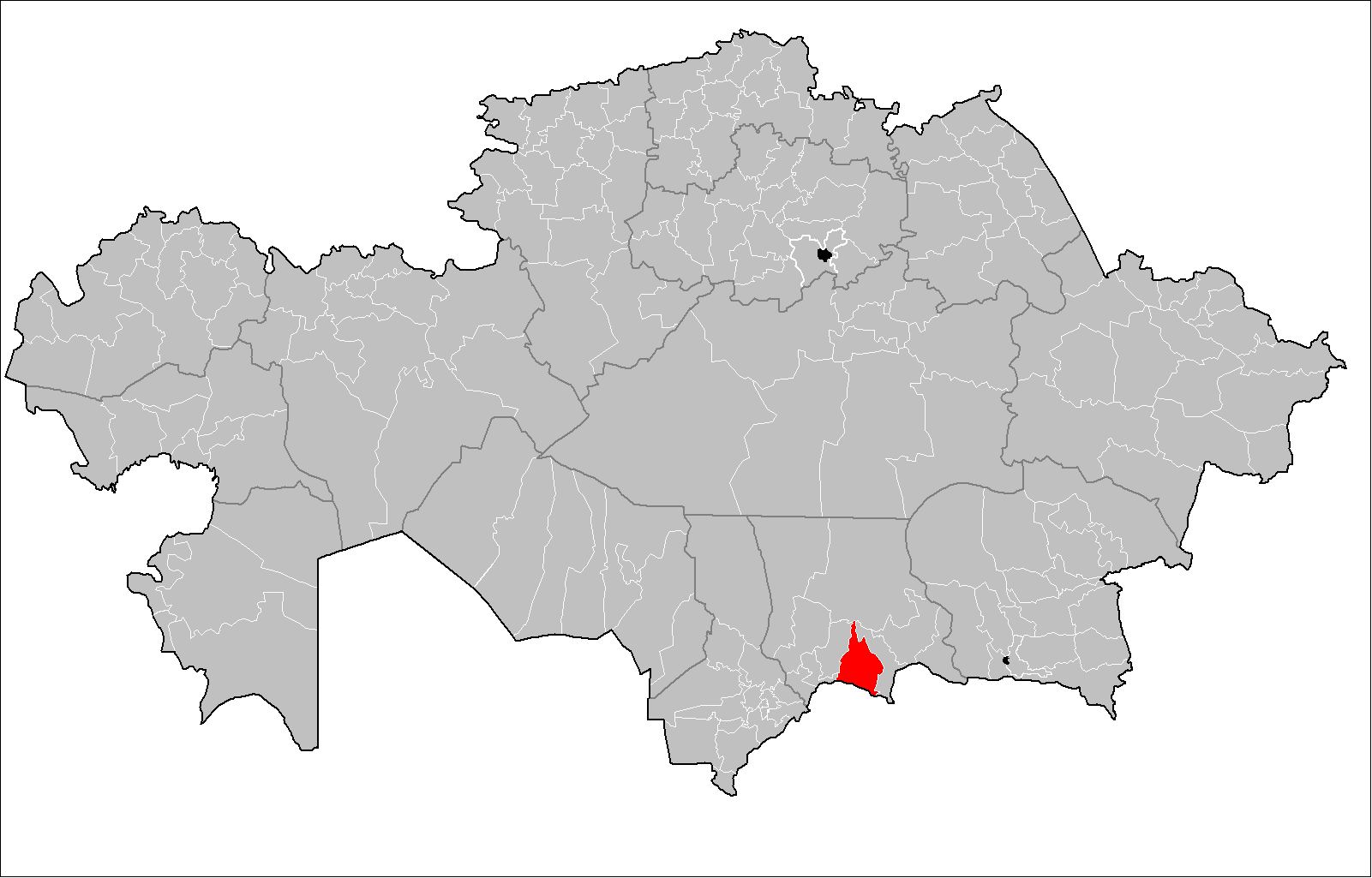
- Location of Turar Ryskulov District in Kazakhstan
- Coordinates: 41°12′N 72°32′E
- Country: Kazakhstan
- Region: Jambyl Region
- Administrative center: Kulan
- Founded: 1938

Government
  - Akim: Yesirkepov Ernar Serikkalievich

Area
  - Total: 10,500 km^{2} (4,100 sq mi)

Population (2013)
  - Total: 65,033
  - Density: 6.19/km^{2} (16.0/sq mi)
- Time zone: UTC+6 (East)

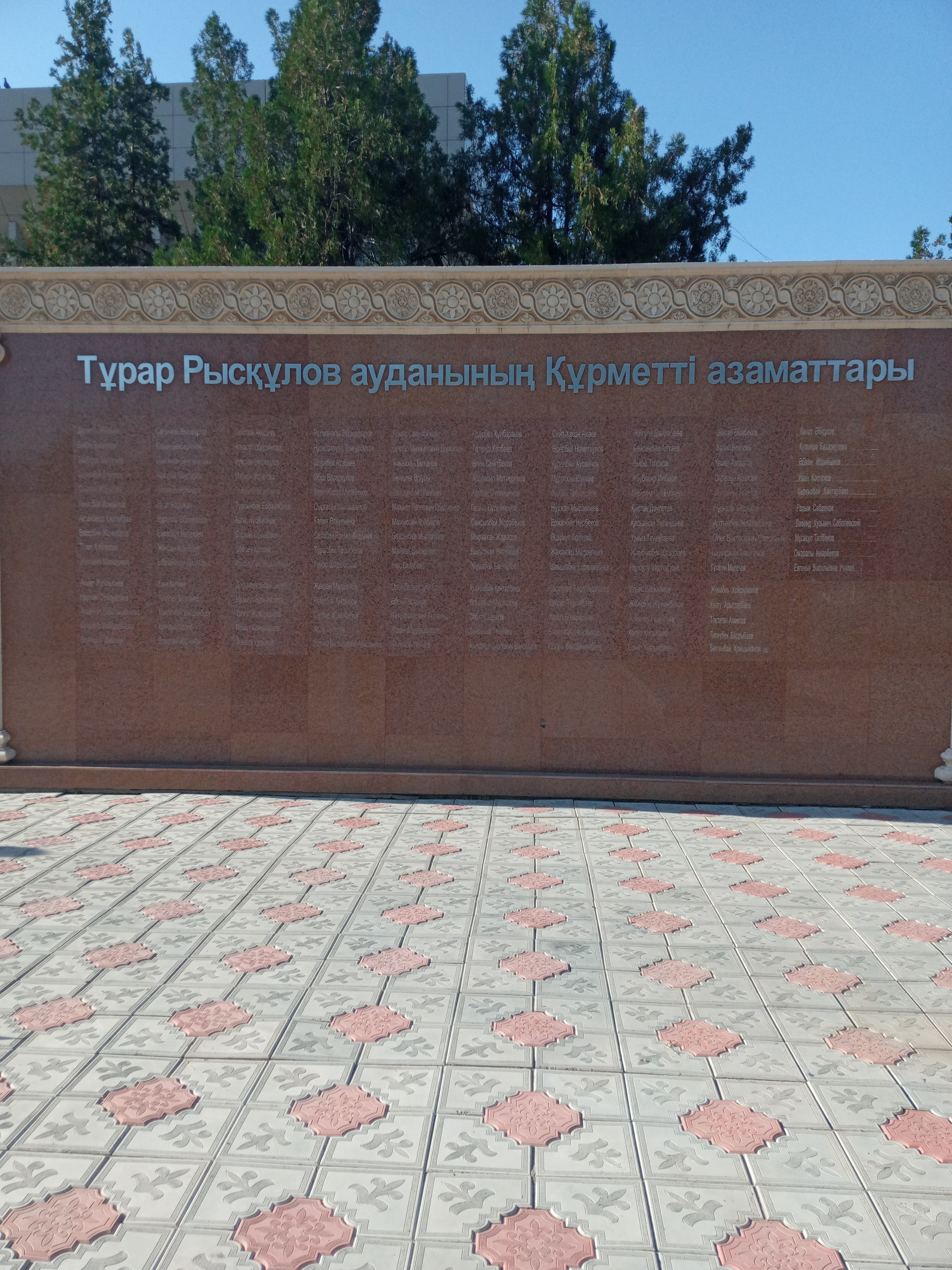
Honorary citizens

Turar Ryskulov (Kazakh: Тұрар Рысқұлов ауданы, Tūrar Rysqūlov audany) is a district of Jambyl Region in south-eastern Kazakhstan. The administrative center of the district is auyl of Kulan.

== History ==
By the decree of the Presidium of the Supreme Soviet of the Kaz. USSR dated March 4, 1938, Lugovsky district was separated from Merki District. At that time there were 27 collective farms and 2 state farms. They were united into 10 aul districts. Initially, there were 8 2662 hectares of farmland. Cereals were located on an area of 13 464 hectares, beets on 960 hectares and cotton on 1 550 hectares. In Soviet times, grain crops increased to 130 thousand hectares.

In 1954, three virgin state farms were established in the steppes of Abulkair and Koragata. And today's corporation "Podgorny", LLP "Koragaty" and "Akbulak" were also organized by the forces of pervotselinniki.

For 70 years, the district has reached considerable heights in the development of the economy, in improving the welfare of the people. By the Decree of the Presidium of the Republic of Kazakhstan dated March 11, 1999, Lugovsky district of Jambyl Region was renamed T. Ryskulov district.
