= Karatau Mountains =

Mountains in southern Kazakhstan

Karatau
- Қаратау жотасы
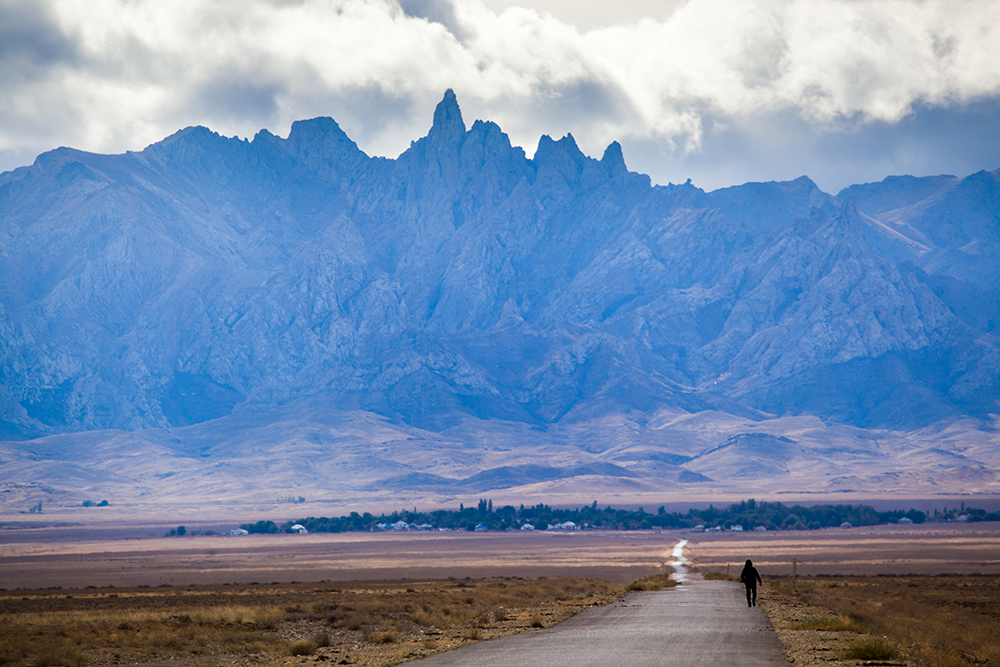
- Karatau Nature Reserve, Kazakhstan

Highest point
- Peak: Bessaz
- Elevation: 2,176 m (7,139 ft)
- Coordinates: 42°53′20″N 69°58′50″E

Dimensions
- Length: 420 km (260 mi) NW/SE
- Width: 90 km (56 mi) NE/SW

Geography
- Location within Kazakhstan
- Location: Kazakhstan
- Parent range: Tian Shan

Geology
- Orogeny: Alpine orogeny
- Rock type(s): Shale, sandstone, limestone

Climbing
- Easiest route: From Kentau

The Karatau or Qaratau (Kazakh: Қаратау жотасы, Qaratau jotasy) is a mountain range located in southern Kazakhstan. The mountains have deposits of phosphorite, lead, and zinc.

== Name ==
Qaratau (Қаратау) is Kazakh for the "Black Mountain" or "Mountain Range". The English name Karatau derives from accounts of Russian exploration of the area.

== Geography ==
The range extends for about 420 kilometres (260 mi) in a roughly NW/SE direction just north of the Syr Darya. The Muyunkum Desert lies to the north of the range. The Karatau is the westernmost prolongation of the Tian Shan. The summits of the mountains are smooth and the slopes are cut by snow-fed rivers. The Shabakty, Kyrshabakty, Ushbas, Bugun and Asa, are among the rivers having their sources in the range.

== World Heritage Status ==
There are numerous ancient archaeological sites in the range that display the stages of cultural evolution from the early Paleolithic Age (1 million BP) to the Neolithic Age (6500 BP). This site was added to the UNESCO World Heritage Tentative List on September 24, 1998 in the Cultural category.

== Nature Reserve ==
The Karatau Nature Reserve is a protected area in the range established in 2004.
