= Sarysu District =

Coordinates: 45°24′00″N 70°15′36″E

Sarysu
- District
- Сарысу ауданы
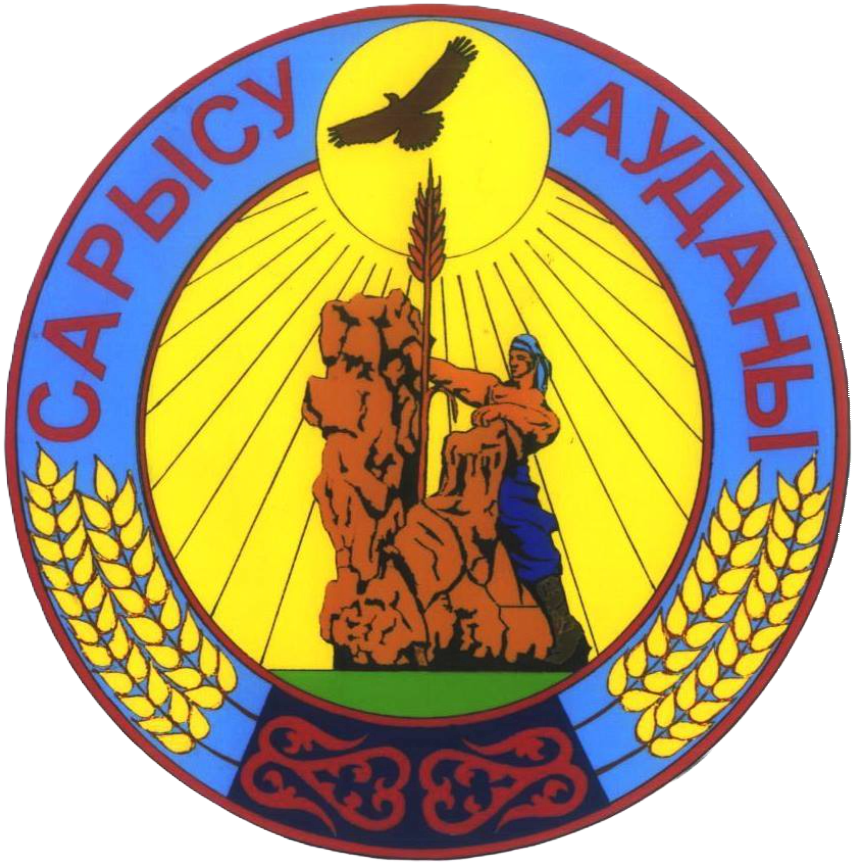
- Seal

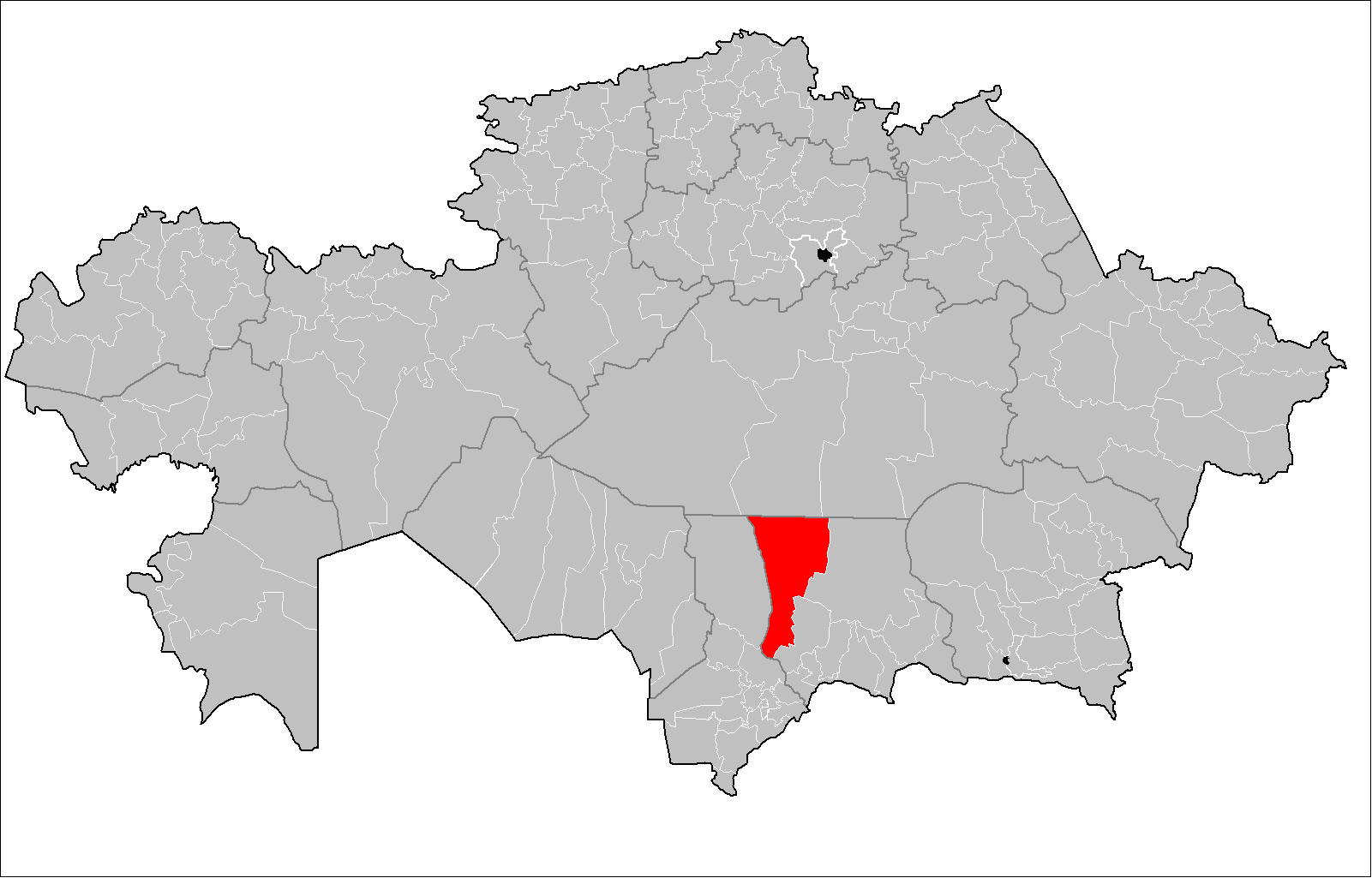
- Location of Sarysu District in Kazakhstan
- Country: Kazakhstan
- Region: Jambyl Region
- Administrative center: Janatas

Government
  - Akim: Saken Mamytov

Population (2023)
  - Total: 44,115
- Time zone: UTC+6 (East)

Sarysu (Kazakh: Сарысу ауданы, Sarysu audany) is a district of Jambyl Region in south-eastern Kazakhstan. The administrative center of the district is the town of Janatas. Sarysu District's population in 2023 was 44,115, up from 41,105 in 2009 but down from 48,594 in 1999.

== Geography ==
The district is named after the Sarysu River. Parts of it are in the lower basin of the Chu river, at the edge of the Moiynkum Desert. Lakes Ulken Kamkaly and Sorkol are located in the district.
