= Jambyl Region =

Region in southern Kazakhstan

Jambyl Region Jambyl oblysy, Жамбыл облысы (Kazakh) Жамбылская область (Russian)
- Region
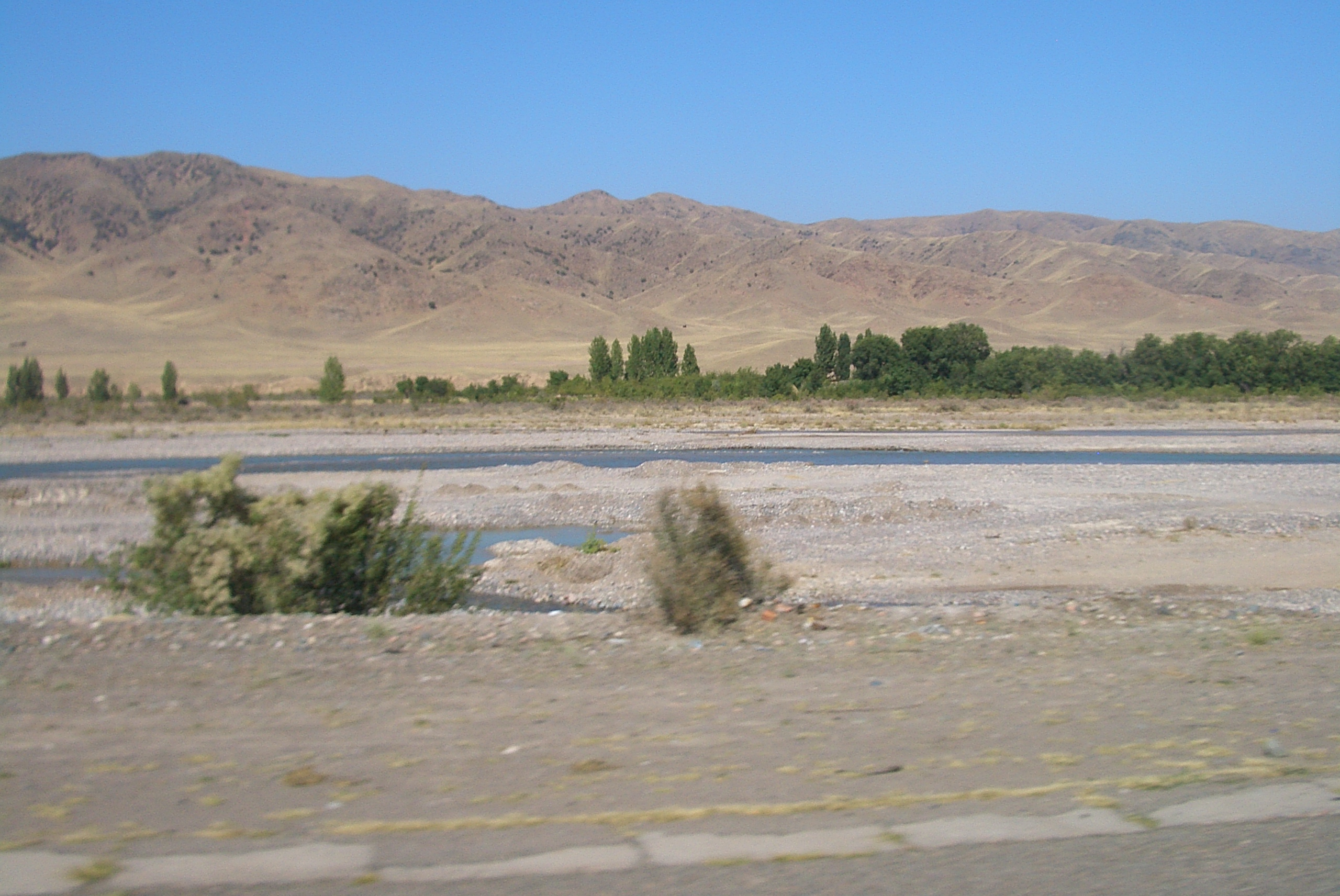
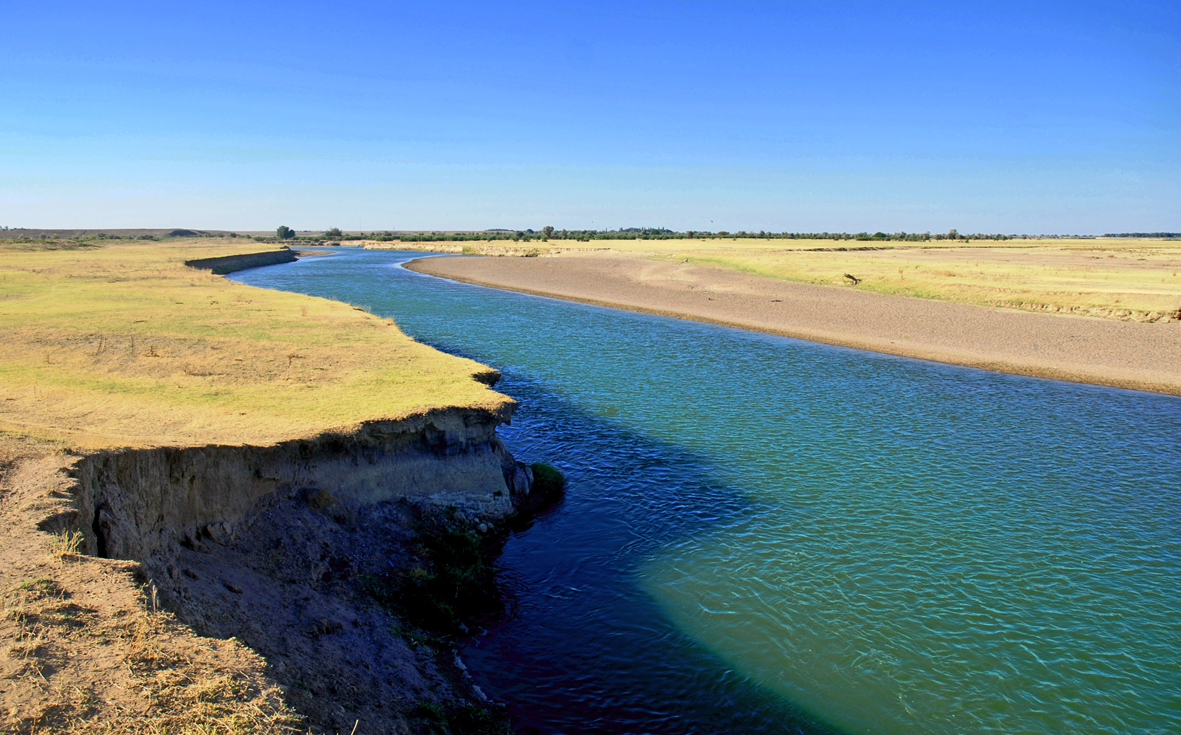
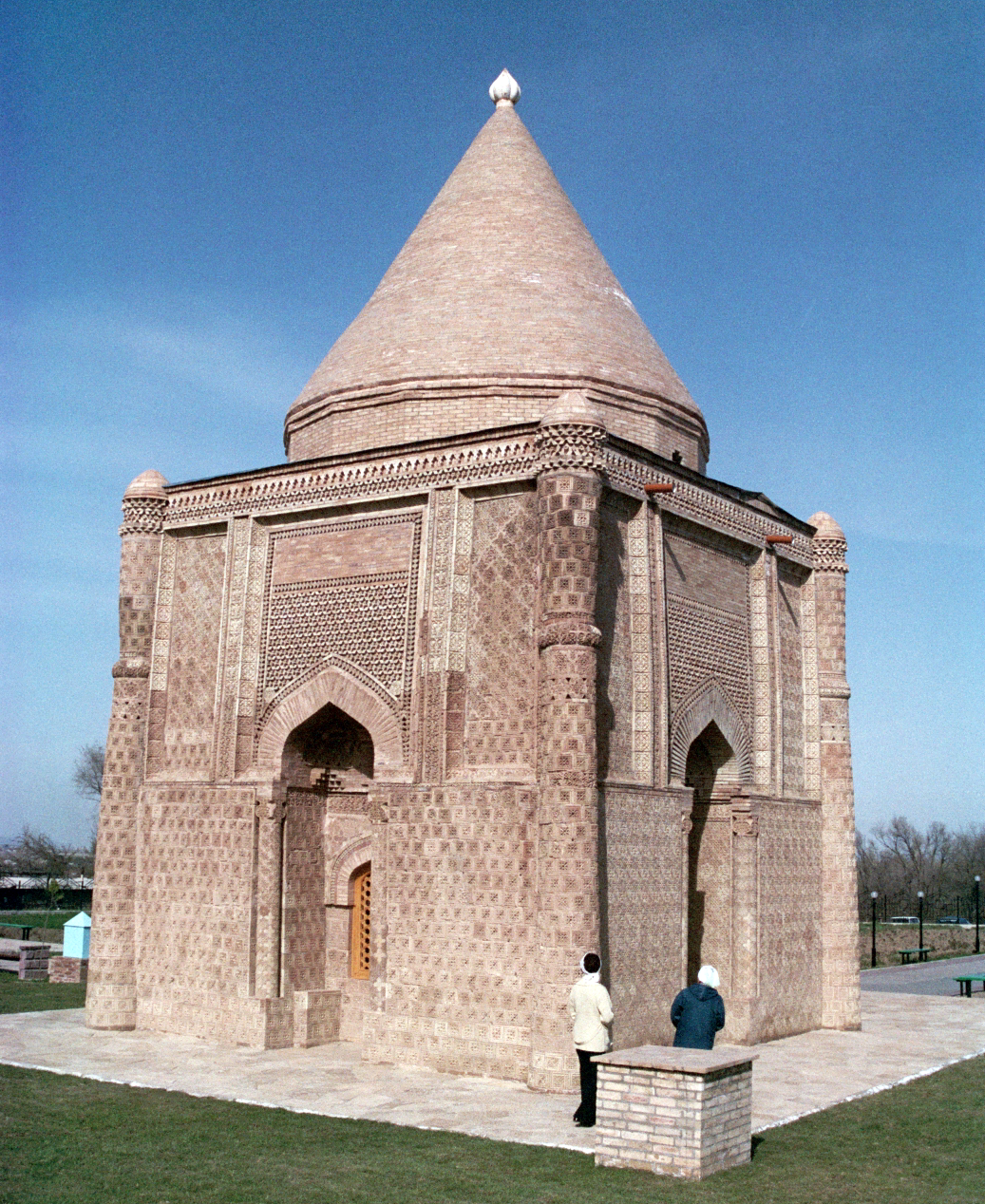
- From the top, Chu River, Moiynkum District, Aisha Bibi

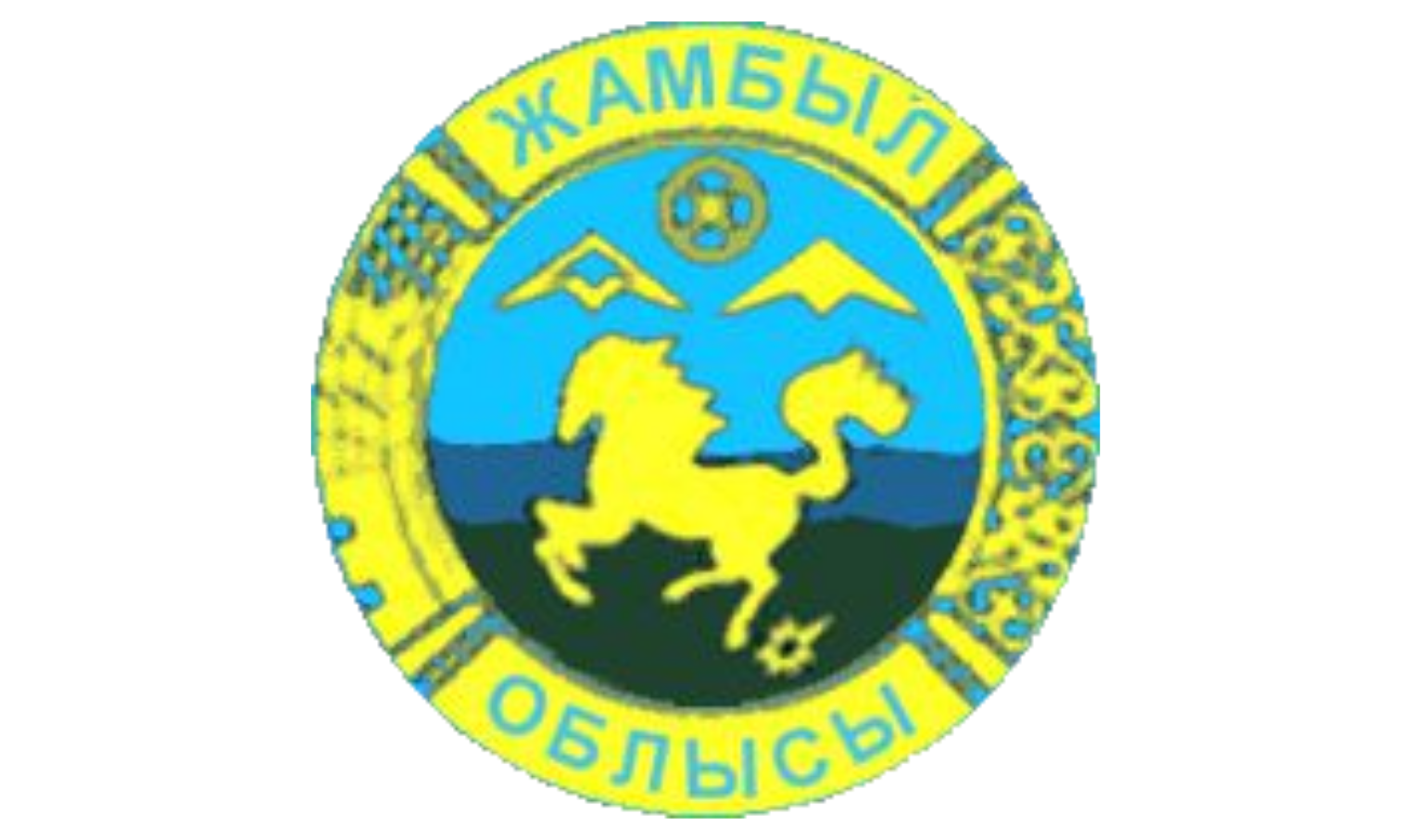
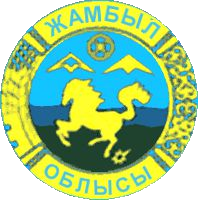
- Flag Coat of arms

- Map of Kazakhstan, location of Jambyl Province highlighted
- Coordinates: 44°0′N 72°0′E
- Country: Kazakhstan
- Capital: Taraz

Government
  - Akim: Erbol Qaraşökeev

Area
  - Total: 144,264 km^{2} (55,701 sq mi)

Population (2022-01-01)
  - Total: 1,209,665
  - Density: 8.38508/km^{2} (21.7173/sq mi)

GDP (Nominal, 2024)
  - Total: KZT 3,237 billion (US$ 6.979 billion) · 15th
  - Per capita: KZT 2,647,700 (US$ 5,560)
- Time zone: UTC+5
  - Summer (DST): UTC+5 (not observed)
- Postal codes: 080000
- Area codes: +7 (726)
- ISO 3166 code: KZ-ZHA
- Vehicle registration: 08, H
- Districts: 10
- Cities: 4
- Villages: 367
- HDI (2022): 0.785 high · 6th
- Website: www.zhambyl.gov.kz

Jambyl Region, (Note: Kazakh: Жамбыл облысы, romanized: Jambyl oblysy; Russian: Жамбылская область, romanized: Žambylskaja oblastj) formerly named Dzhambul Region (Note: Russian: Джамбульская область, romanized: Džambuljskaja oblastj) until 1991, is a region of Kazakhstan. The population of the region is 1,209,665. Its administrative center is Taraz, with a population of 335,100. To the south the region borders Kyrgyzstan and nearly borders Uzbekistan in the southwest. Jambyl also borders three other provinces of Kazakhstan: Karaganda Region (to the north), Turkistan Region (to the west), and Almaty Region (to the east). The total area is 144,200 square kilometres (55,700 mi^{2}). The province borders Lake Balkhash to its northeast. The province (and its capital during the Soviet era) was named after the Kazakh akyn (folk singer) Jambyl Jabayev.

== History ==
The Dzhambul Region was formed by decree of the Presidium of the Supreme Soviet on October 14, 1939, and included nine districts, of which six were separated from the South Kazakhstan and three from the Alma-Ata region.

=== Arys ammunition explosion ===
In August 2021, nine people were killed in a major explosion in at a Kazakhstani ammunition depot at a military unit in Taraz in the Jambyl Region of Kazakhstan. As a result, Minister of Defense Nurlan Yermekbayev announced his intent to resign on 27 August 2021. Four days later his resignation was accepted by President Kassym-Jomart Tokayev, with Yermekbayev accepting responsibility for the tragedy, and was succeeded by Lieutenant General Murat Bektanov. The leaders of foreign countries and international organizations delivered condolences and all government websites were grayscaled in memoriam.

== Demographics ==
As of 2020, the Jambyl Region has a population of 1,130,099.

Ethnic groups (2020):

- Kazakh: 72.81%
- Russian: 9.60%
- Dungan: 5.29%
- Turkish: 3.07%
- Uzbek: 2.54%
- Others: 6.69%

== Administrative divisions ==
The province is administratively divided into ten districts and the city of Taraz.

1. Bayzak District, with the administrative center in the auyl of Sarykemer;
2. Jambyl District, with the auyl of Asy;
3. Korday District, with the auyl of Korday;
4. Merki District, with the auyl of Merki;
5. Moiynkum District, with the auyl of Moiynkum;
6. Sarysu District, with the town of Janatas;
7. Shu District, with the auyl of Tole bi;
8. Talas District, with the town of Karatau;
9. Turar Ryskulov District, with the auyl of Kulan;
10. Zhualy District, with the auyl of Bauyrzhan Momyshuly.

Janatas, Karatau, Shu, have the administrative status of town, whereas Taraz has the administrative status of a city.

== Economy ==
Important industries include rock phosphate mining (around Karatau). The Chu River valley is one of Kazakhstan's important areas of irrigated agriculture.

The core of the rail transportation network in the region is based on the east–west Turksib rail line, which runs through Taraz and Chu toward Almaty, and the north–south Transkazakhstan line, which runs north from Chu toward Nur-Sultan. CIS Highway M 39 (which in this area forms part of European route E40) comes from Tashkent, Uzbekistan over Shymkent (capital of neighbouring province South Kazakhstan) and runs further over Taraz to Bishkek, Kyrgyzstan; then it comes to Jambyl Province again through Korday border crossing and continues east toward Almaty.

In February 2021, it was announced that a wind farm and a hydro power plant will be launched in the Zhambyl region during the 2021 year, and two more renewable energy facilities are planned to be launched in the area in the near future.

In May 2024, it was announced that a chemical complex producing mineral fertilizers would be built in Janatas, the total investment being over $1 billion USD.

The average monthly salary in Jambyl region is $548.

== Tourism ==
In 2018, the Jambyl region began the reconstruction of the Tekturmas historical complex. Located on the outskirts of the city, this complex is aimed at highlighting and preserving the cultural heritage of the country. Currently, the site is home to 14 monuments, a waterfall, observatory platforms, and a medieval style fortress that surrounds the complex.

== Gallery ==
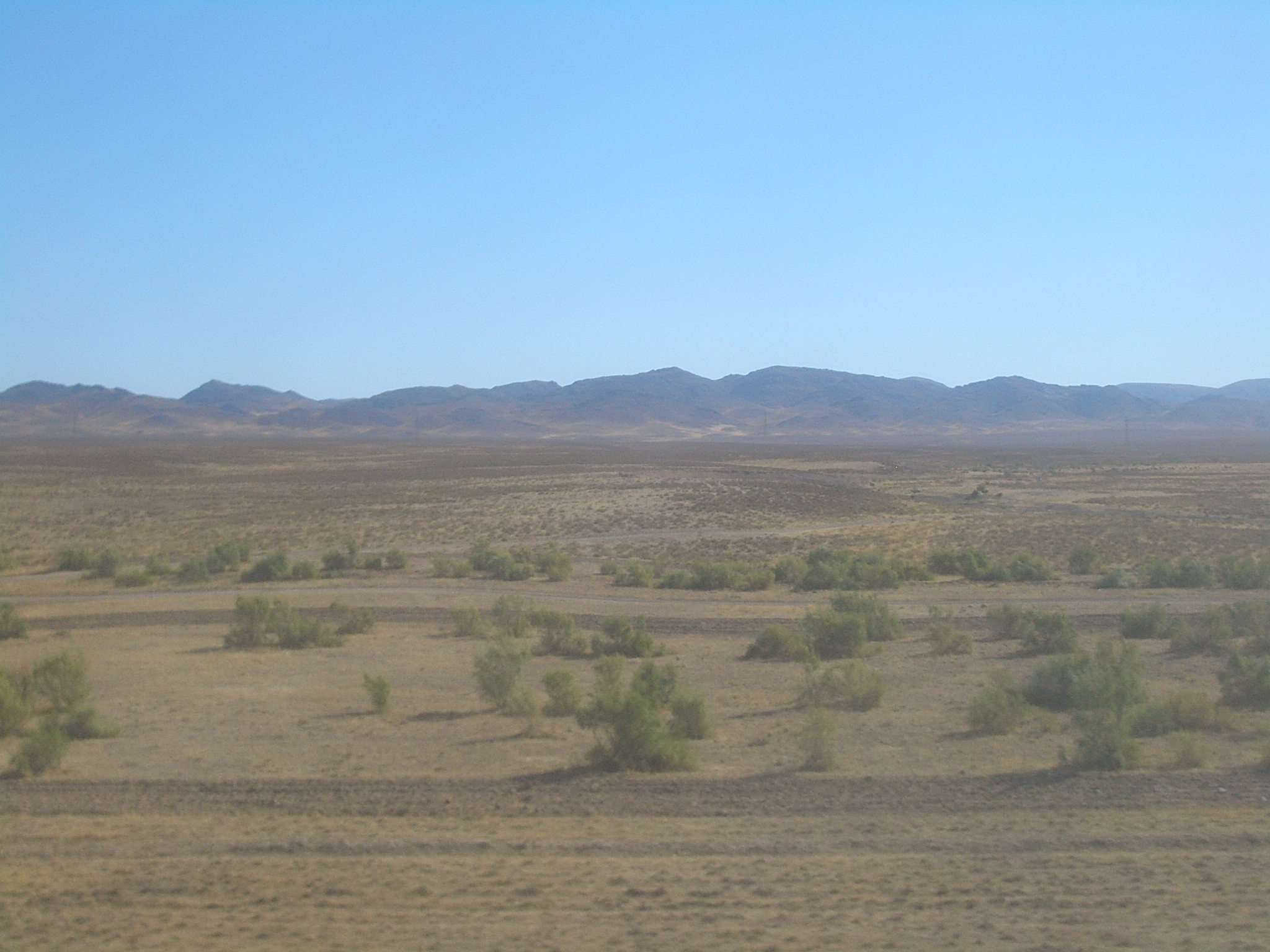
In the steppe north of the town of Shu

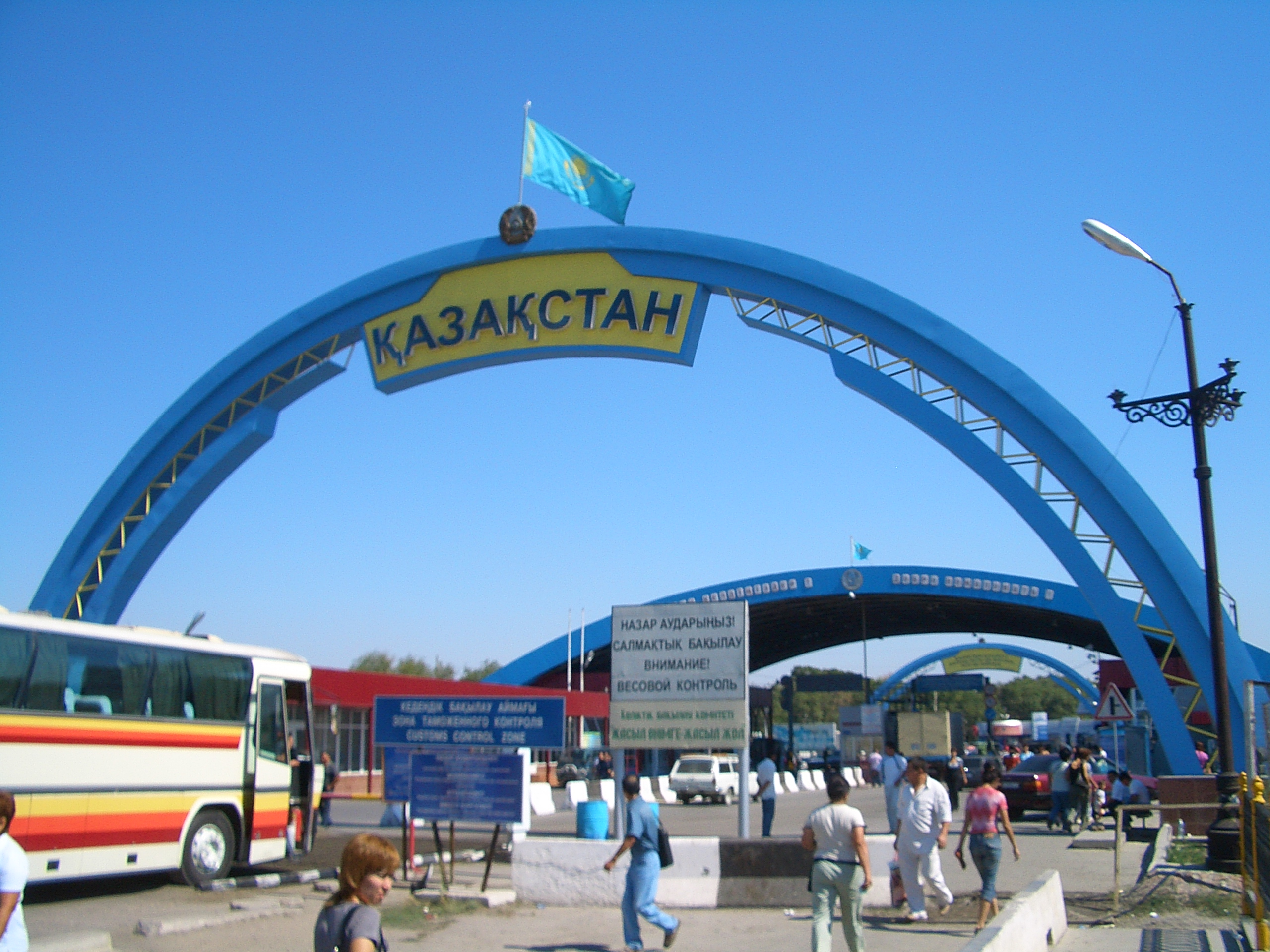
Entering Kazakhstan (and Jambyl Province) via Korday Bridge over the Chu

== See also ==
- Merke Turkic Sanctuaries
