= Kyzylbelen =

Mountain in Kazakhstan

- Қызылбелен
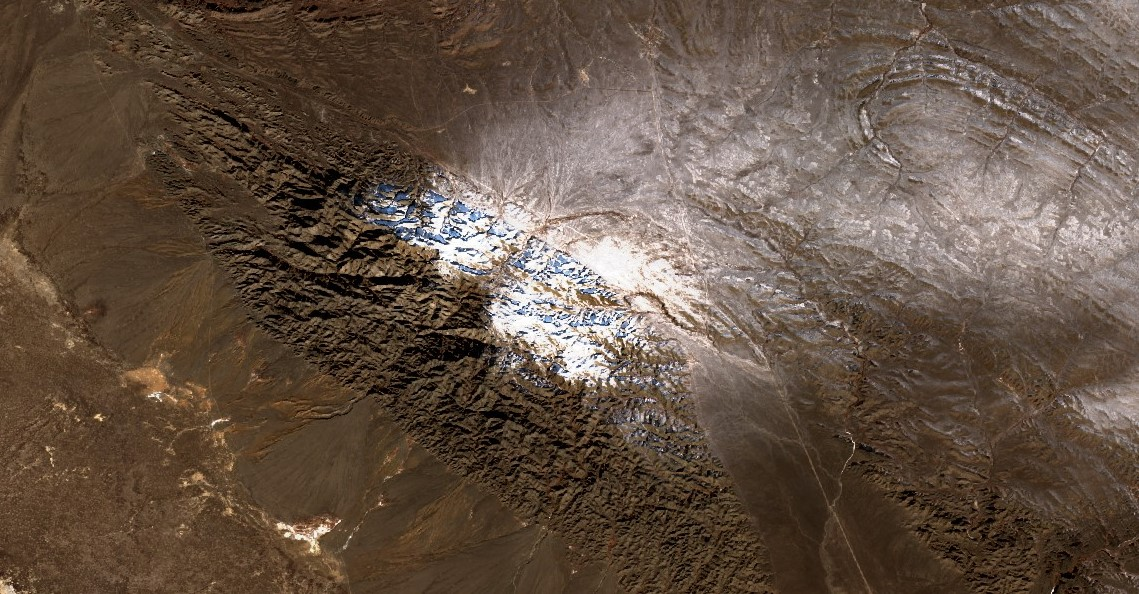
- Sentinel-2 image centered on the Zhambyl Massif

Highest point
- Elevation: 972 m (3,189 ft)
- Coordinates: 44°48′17″N 73°00′54″E

Geography
- Location within Kazakhstan
- Country: Kazakhstan
- Region: Jambyl Region
- Parent range: Zhambyl; Zheltau

Geology
- Rock age: Paleozoic
- Mountain type: Effusive rock

Climbing
- Easiest route: From Mirny

Kyzylbelen (Kazakh: Қызылбелен; Russian: гора Кызылбелен) is a mountain in Moiynkum District, Jambyl Region, Kazakhstan.

== Geography ==
The Kyzylbelen rises in the center of the northern part of the Zhambyl massif, at the eastern edge of the Betpak Dala. It is located close to the southern section of the Zheltau, part of the Chu-Ili Range. With an elevation of 972 metres (3,189 ft), it is the highest summit of the Zhambyl massif.

In some works the Zhambyl massif is considered part of the Zheltau, although the highest point of the Zheltau in the strict sense is the 599 metres (1,965 ft) high Suykadyr further north.

== See also ==
- Geography of Kazakhstan
