= Aitau =

Mountain range in Kazakhstan

- Айтау
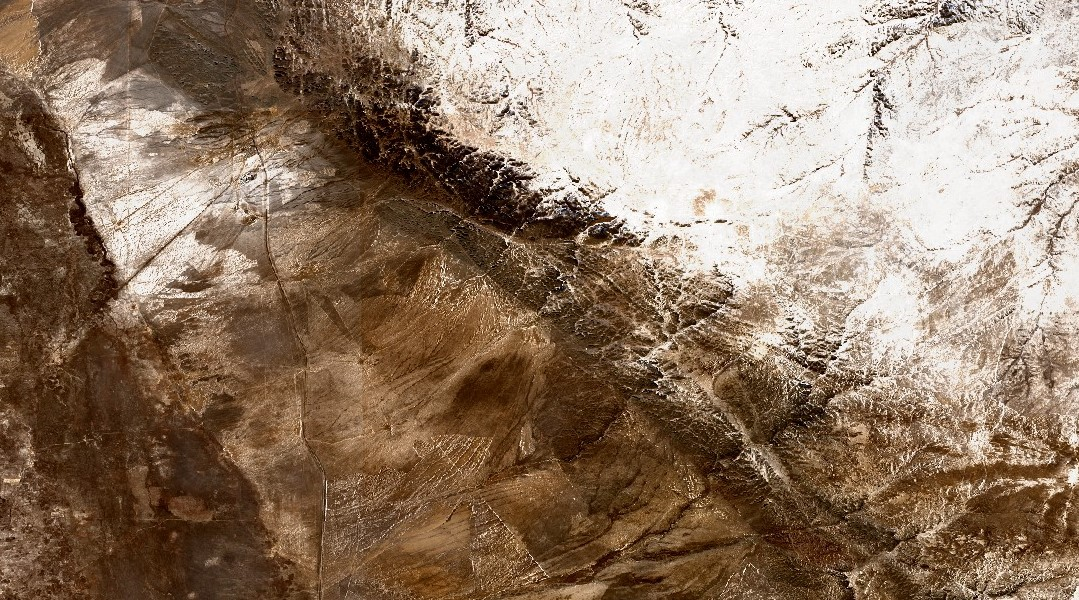
- Sentinel-2 image centered on the Aitau Range

Highest point
- Peak: Sunkar
- Elevation: 1,052 m (3,451 ft)
- Coordinates: 44°09′40″N 74°01′44″E

Dimensions
- Length: 140 km (87 mi) NW/SE
- Width: 30 km (19 mi) NE/SW

Geography
- Location within Kazakhstan
- Location: Kazakhstan
- Range coordinates: 44°05′N 74°10′E
- Parent range: Chu-Ili Range

Geology
- Orogeny: Hercynian
- Rock age: Paleozoic
- Rock type(s): Schist, gneiss, shale and granite

Climbing
- Easiest route: From Khantau

Aitau (Kazakh: Айтау) is a mountain range located in Jambyl Region, Kazakhstan.

The range rises in an almost uninhabited area. Khantau village, Moiynkum District, lies 3 kilometers (1.9 mi) to the west of the slopes of the Khantau massif, the northern section of the range.

== Geography ==
The Aitau Range is a northern prolongation of the Chu-Ili Range. It is located to the south of the Mayzharylgan range. The Betpak-Dala desert lies to the west.

The highest point of the Aitau is 972 meters (3,189 ft) high Mount Sunkar, rising in the Khantau massif at the northwestern end of the range.

== Flora ==
The soil is pale and has low carbonate content. Some of the plants found in the range include Artemisia, sedges and Achnatherum, the latter forming clumps.

== See also ==
- Geography of Kazakhstan
