= Sunkar =

Mountain in Kazakhstan

- Сұңқар
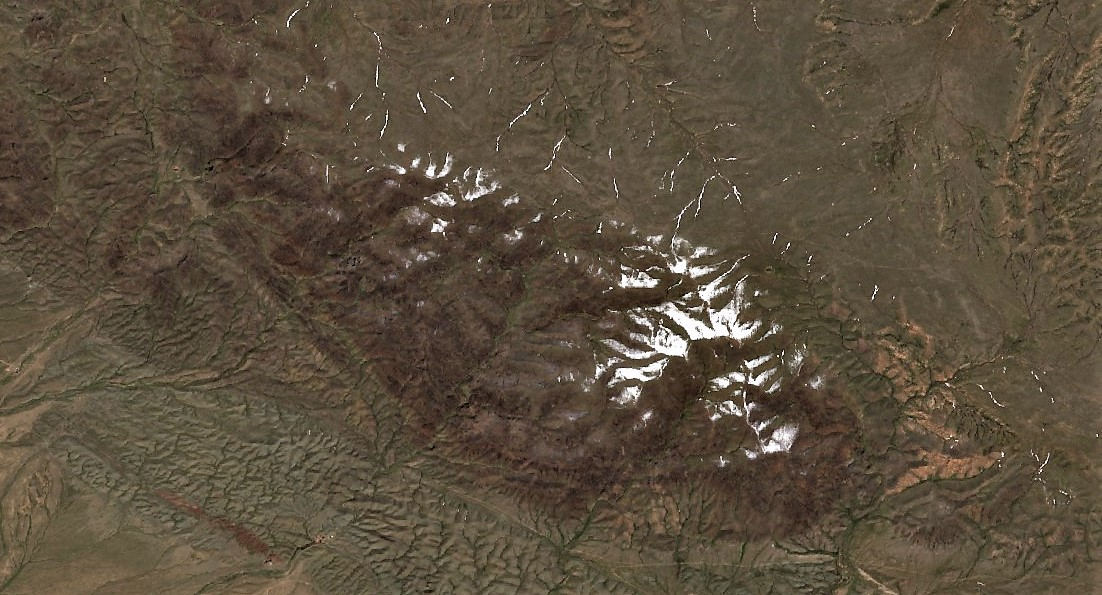
- Sentinel-2 image centered on the Khantau Massif

Highest point
- Elevation: 1,052 m (3,451 ft)
- Coordinates: 44°13′01″N 73°59′34″E

Geography
- Location within Kazakhstan
- Country: Kazakhstan
- Region: Jambyl Region
- Parent range: Khantau; Aitau

Geology
- Rock age(s): Devonian, Silurian
- Mountain type: Granite

Climbing
- Easiest route: From Khantau

Sunkar (Kazakh: Сұңқар) is a mountain in Moiynkum District, Jambyl Region, Kazakhstan.

== Geography ==
Sunkar rises in the northern flank of the Khantau massif, the northern section of the Aitau, part of the Chu-Ili Range. With an elevation 1,052 metres (3,451 ft), it is the highest summit of the range.

== See also ==
- Geography of Kazakhstan
