= Kamkalykol =

Lake in Kazakhstan

- Қамқалыкөл
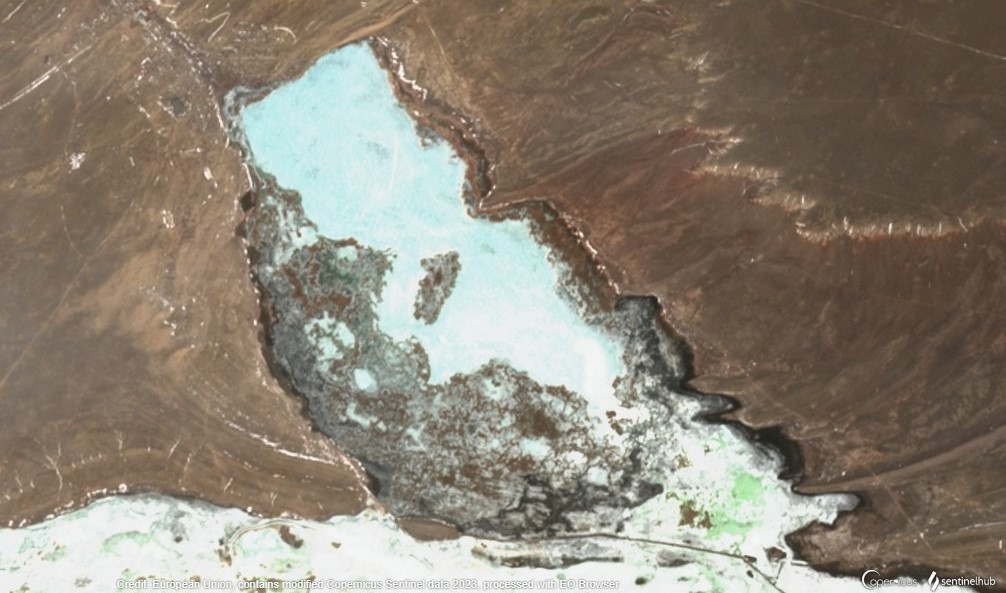
- Sentinel-2 image of the lake in March

- Location within Kazakhstan
- Location: Moiynkum District
- Coordinates: 44°43′26″N 71°32′21″E
- Type: floodplain lake
- Basin countries: Kazakhstan
- Max. length: 4.8 kilometers (3.0 mi)
- Max. width: 2.1 kilometers (1.3 mi)
- Residence time: UTC+6
- Surface elevation: 274 meters (899 ft)

Kamkalykol (Kazakh: Қамқалыкөл) is a lake in the Moiynkum District, Jambyl Region, Kazakhstan.

The lake is located 30 kilometers (19 mi) to the ESE of Ulanbel village. The ruins of ghost town Kishi Kamkaly, abandoned in 2019, lie by the northern end of the lake. The lake water is used for watering livestock grazing in the surrounding area.

== Geography ==
Kamkalykol lies in the lower Shu river basin to the north of the river channel. Lake Karakol is located 9 kilometers (5.6 mi) to the northwest and lake Zhalanash 22 kilometers (14 mi) to the west. Kamkalykol stretches roughly from northwest to southeast for almost 5 kilometers (3.1 mi). To the south it is bound by the Shu floodplain.

Kamkalykol freezes over in mid-November and thaws in March. On average the water level rises right after the melting of the snow in the spring and decreases in the summer.

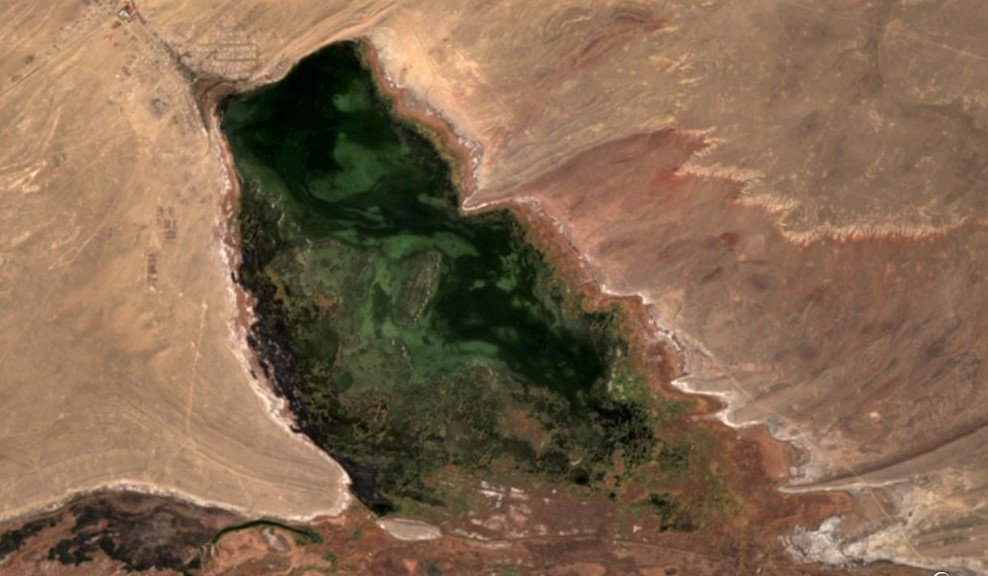
Sentinel-2 image of the lake in September.

== Flora ==
The lake is swampy, especially in its southern part. There is abundant reed growth by the lakeshore and in shallow areas.

== See also ==
- List of lakes of Kazakhstan
