= Zhambyl (mountain) =

Massif in Kazakhstan

- Жамбыл
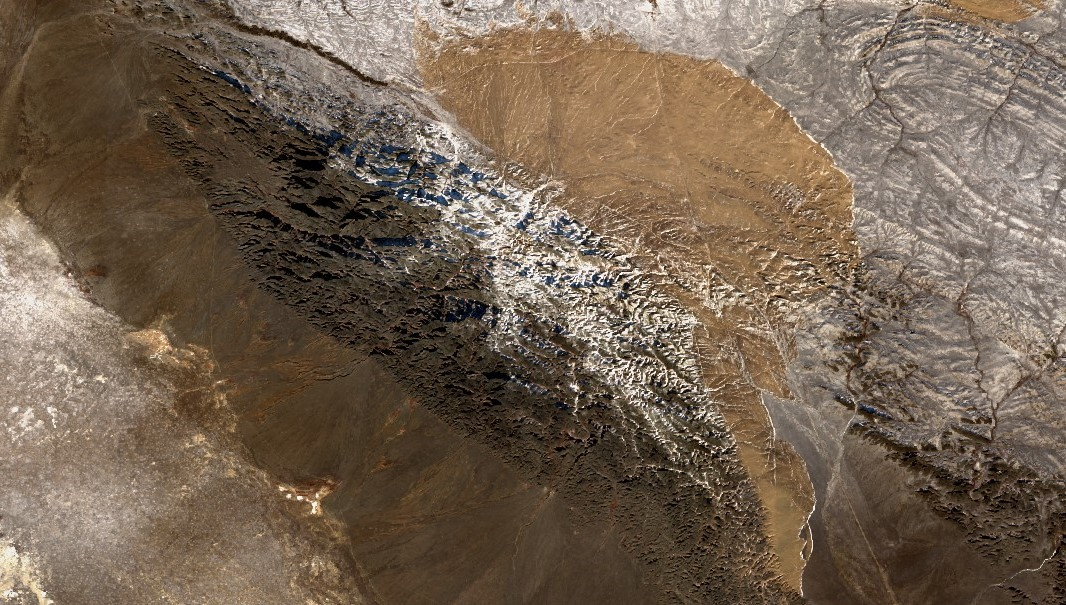
- Sentinel-2 image centered on the Zhambyl Massif

Highest point
- Peak: Kyzylbelen
- Elevation: 972 m (3,189 ft)
- Coordinates: 44°48′34″N 73°01′11″E

Dimensions
- Length: 25 km (16 mi) NW/SE
- Width: 6 km (3.7 mi) NE/SW

Geography
- Location within Kazakhstan
- Location: Kazakhstan
- Range coordinates: 44°46′N 73°00′E
- Parent range: Chu-Ili Range

Geology
- Rock age: Paleozoic
- Rock type(s): Effusive and sedimentary rocks

Climbing
- Easiest route: From Mirny

Zhambyl (Kazakh: Жамбыл; Russian: Горы Джамбул) is a massif located in Jambyl Region, Kazakhstan.

Mount Zhambyl rises in an almost uninhabited area. Mirny, a mining town in the Moiynkum District, lies 55 kilometers (34 mi) to the east.

== Geography ==
The Zhambyl massif is a northern prolongation of the Chu-Ili Range. It is located off the southwestern slopes of the southern section of the Zheltau upland, on the other side of which lies the Balkhash-Alakol Basin. It extends from northwest to southeast for about 25 kilometers (16 mi) to the north of the Mayzharylgan. The Betpak-Dala desert lies to the west.

The highest point of the Zhambyl is 972 meters (3,189 ft) high Mount Kyzylbelen, rising near the northern edge.

== Flora ==
The soil is gray and crumbly. Some of the plants found in the range include Artemisia santolina, Anabasis, Salsola arbuscula, as well as sedges, especially in the valleys.

== See also ==
- Geography of Kazakhstan
