= Karakol (Chu basin) =

Lake in Kazakhstan

- Қаракөл
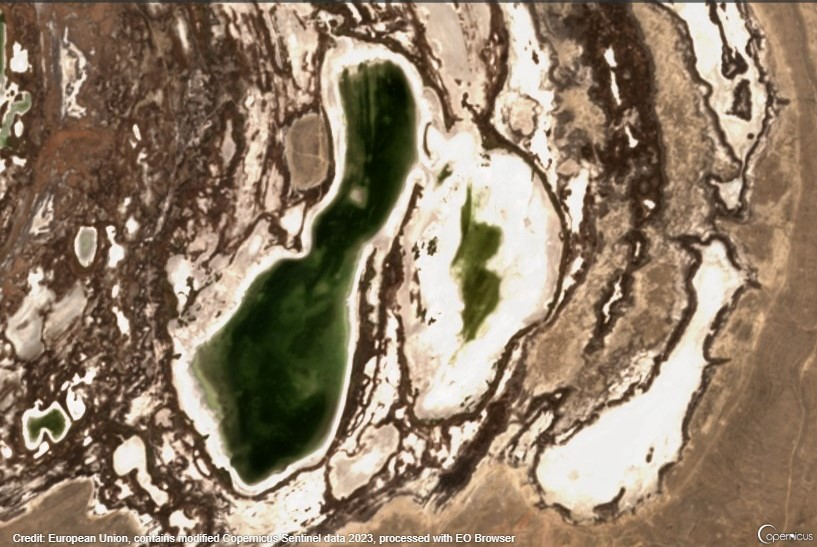
- Sentinel-2 image of the lake in September

- Location within Kazakhstan
- Location: Moiynkum District
- Coordinates: 44°48′54″N 71°26′44″E
- Type: brackish lake
- Basin countries: Kazakhstan
- Max. length: 3.2 kilometers (2.0 mi)
- Max. width: 1 kilometer (0.62 mi)
- Shore length^{1}: 20.5 kilometers (12.7 mi)
- Surface elevation: 262 meters (860 ft)
- ^{1} Shore length is not a well-defined measure.

Karakol (Kazakh: Қаракөл) is a lake in the Moiynkum District, Jambyl Region, Kazakhstan.

The lake is located 23 kilometers (14 mi) to the east of Ulanbel village. Although the lake water is somewhat bitter, it can be used for watering livestock grazing in the surrounding area.

== Geography ==
Karakol lies in the lower Chu river basin, roughly 8 kilometers (5.0 mi) to the northeast of the river channel. Lake Zhalanash is located 17 kilometers (11 mi) to the WSW and Kamkalykol 9 kilometers (5.6 mi) to the southeast. Lake Karakol stretches roughly from north to south for more than 3 kilometers (1.9 mi). It has a large eastern wing or bay that is shallower and dries seasonally. The shores are marshy and the bottom of the lake muddy.

Karakol freezes over in mid-November and thaws in March. On average the water level rises right after the melting of the snows in the spring and decreases in the summer. There are many small lakes nearby.

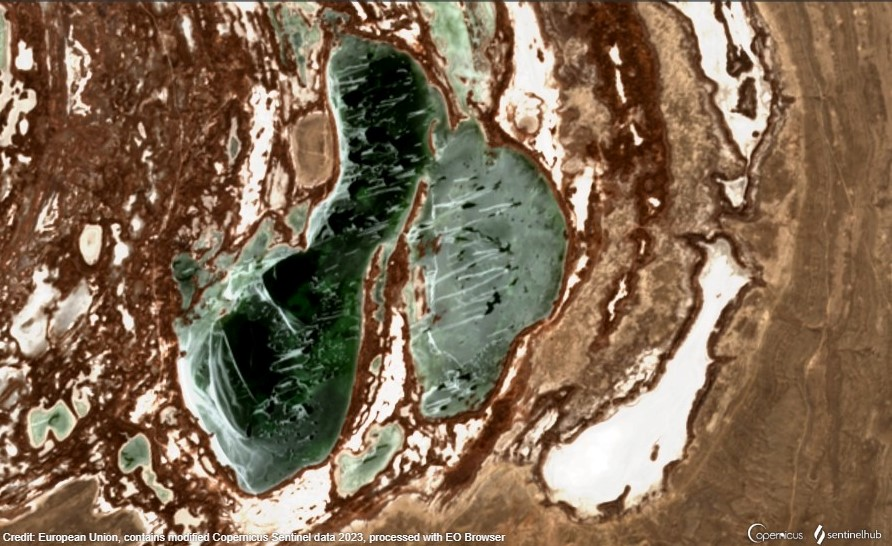
Sentinel-2 image of the frozen lake.

== See also ==
- List of lakes of Kazakhstan
