= Kokuydynkol =

Lake in Kazakhstan

- Кокуйдынколь
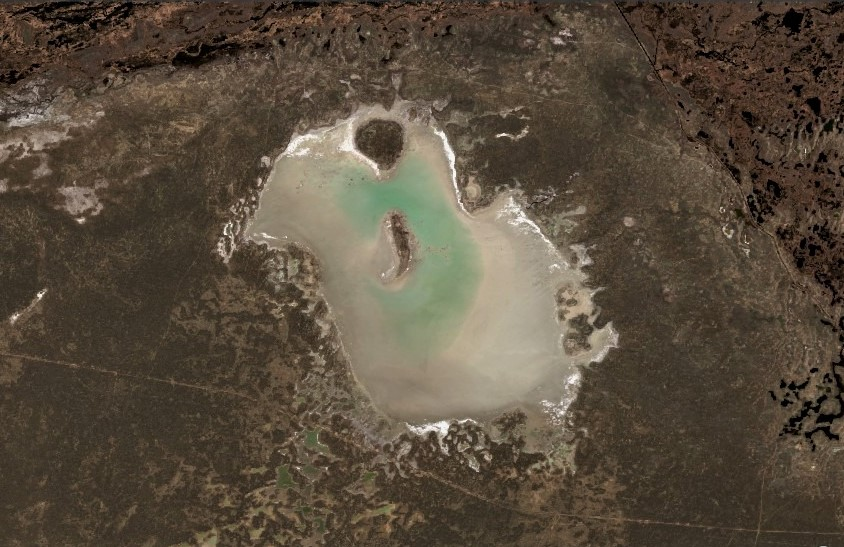
- Sentinel-2 image of the lake in April

- Location within Kazakhstan
- Location: Moiynkum District
- Coordinates: 44°37′N 71°58′E
- Type: Endorheic lake
- Basin countries: Kazakhstan
- Max. length: 10.8 kilometers (6.7 mi)
- Max. width: 7 kilometers (4.3 mi)
- Surface area: 71 square kilometers (27 sq mi)
- Islands: Yes

Kokuydynkol (Russian: Кокуйдынколь) is a salt lake in the Moiynkum District, Jambyl Region, Kazakhstan.

Moiynkum village is located 80 kilometers (50 mi) to the southeast of the lake and Ulanbel 60 kilometers (37 mi) to the WNW.

== Geography ==
Kokuydynkol lies at the northern edge of the Moiynkum Desert, in the lower Chu river basin. It is located less than 5 kilometers (3.1 mi) to the south of the Chu river channel, and 55 kilometers (34 mi) upriver from lake Zhalanash. Both lakes are on the left side of the Chu channel. There is an elongated island in the middle of Kokuydynkol, and a small peninsula in the northern shore.

Kokuydynkol is dry most of the year. On average the lake has water right after the melting of the snows, between March and the beginning of May. By June its waters evaporate and it becomes a huge salt flat.

== Fauna ==
Groups of demoiselle cranes have been recorded by the lake during their yearly migration.

== See also ==
- List of lakes of Kazakhstan
