= Khantau =

Massif in Kazakhstan

- Хантау
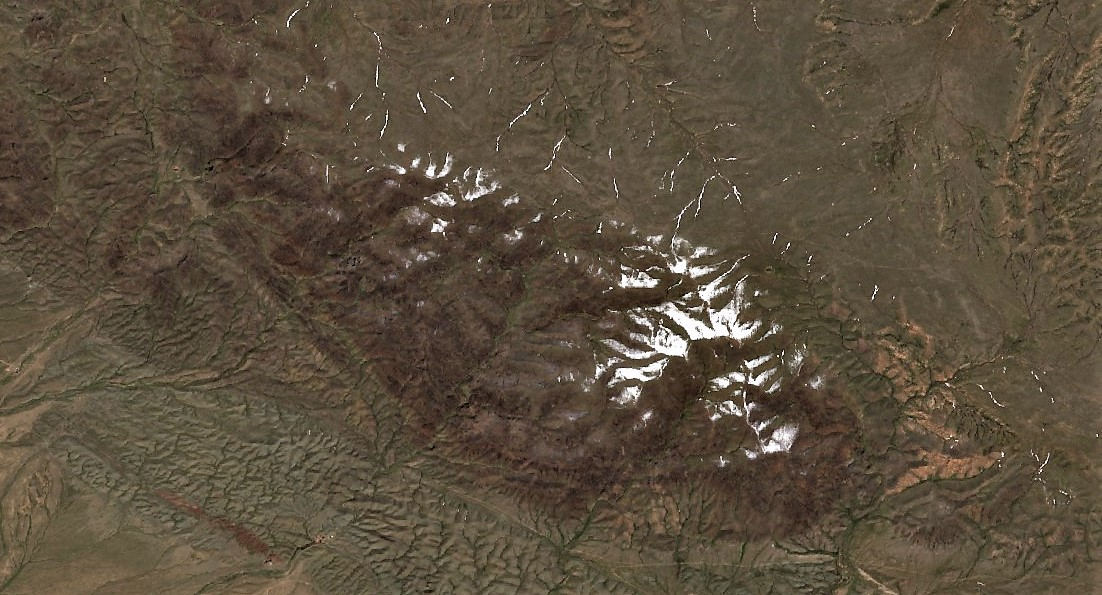
- Sentinel-2 image centered on the Khantau Massif

Highest point
- Peak: Sunkar
- Elevation: 1,052 m (3,451 ft)
- Coordinates: 44°13′01″N 73°59′34″E

Dimensions
- Length: 24 km (15 mi) NW/SE
- Width: 5 km (3.1 mi) NE/SW

Geography
- Location within Kazakhstan
- Location: Kazakhstan
- Range coordinates: 44°15′N 73°50′E
- Parent range: Aitau; Chu-Ili Range

Geology
- Rock age(s): Devonian and Silurian
- Rock type(s): Sandstone and shale

Climbing
- Easiest route: From Khantau

Khantau (Kazakh: Хантау; Russian: Горы Хантау) is a massif located in Jambyl Region, Kazakhstan.

Khantau village, Moiynkum District, lies 3.5 kilometers (2.2 mi) to the west of the NW slopes. There are ancient petroglyphs in the mountains.

== Geography ==
The Khantau massif is part of the northern section of the Aitau, a northern prolongation of the Chu-Ili Range. It is located to the south of the southeastern end of the Mayzharylgan. It extends from northwest to southeast for about 25 kilometers (16 mi). The Aksuyek river has its sources in the range.

The average elevation of the hills in the Khantau is between 600 meters (2,000 ft) and 650 meters (2,130 ft). The highest point of the massif is 1,052 meters (3,451 ft) high Mount Sunkar, which is also the highest summit of the Aitau Range.

== Flora ==
The terrain is gray and cut by deep ravines in places. The range slopes are covered mainly by Artemisias.

== See also ==
- Geography of Kazakhstan
