= Chu-Ili Range =

Mountain range in Kazakhstan

- Шу-Іле таулары
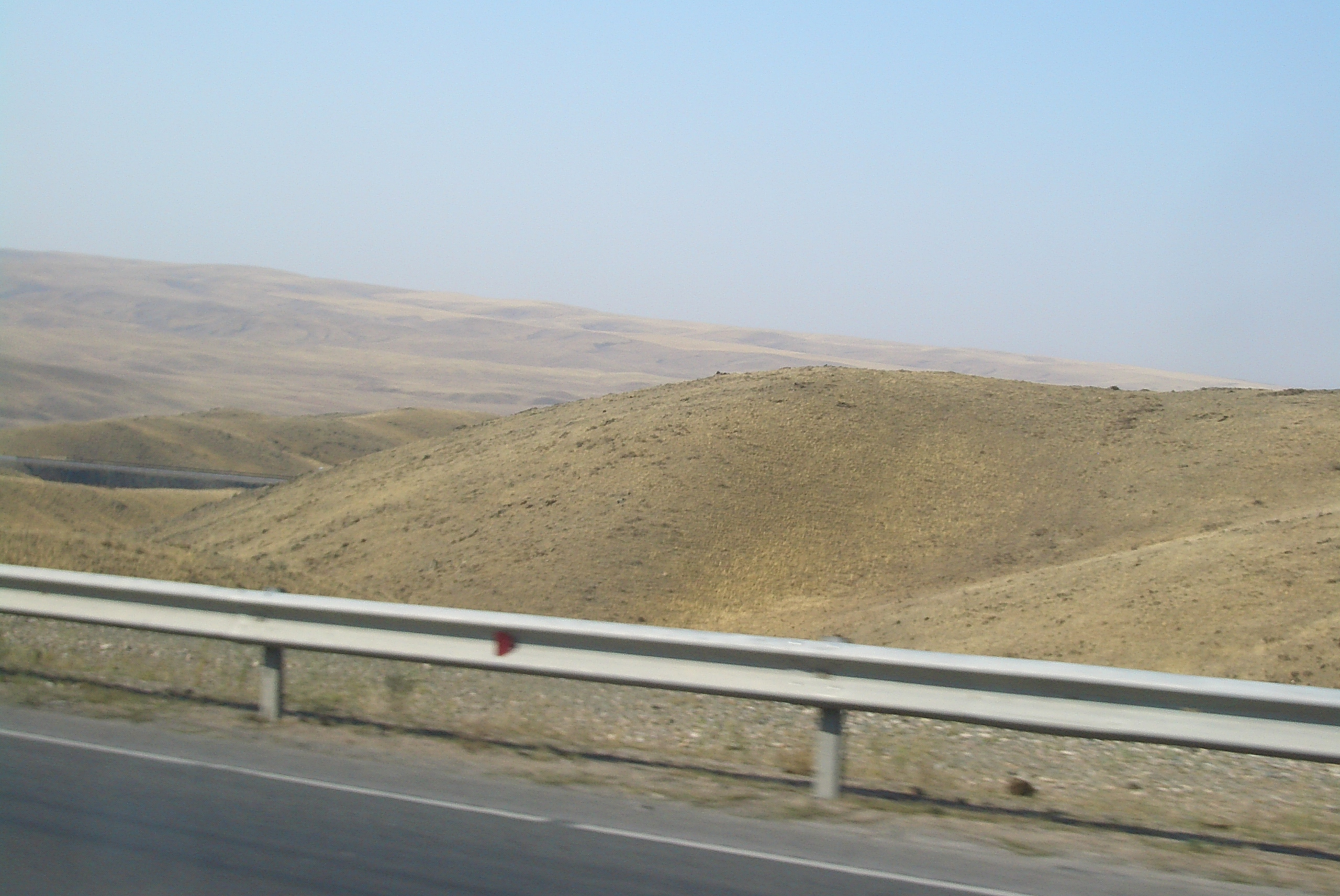
- Landscape of the range

Highest point
- Peak: Anyrakay
- Elevation: 1,294 m (4,245 ft)
- Coordinates: 43°59′N 75°10′E

Dimensions
- Length: 200 km (120 mi) NW / SE
- Width: 60 km (37 mi) NE/ SW

Geography
- Location within Kazakhstan
- Location: Kazakhstan
- Range coordinates: 44°00′N 75°00′E
- Parent range: Trans-Ili Alatau; Tian Shan

Geology
- Orogeny: Hercynian orogeny
- Rock age: Paleozoic
- Rock type(s): Schist, granite

The Chu-Ili Range (Kazakh: Шу-Іле таулары) is a mountain range in Kazakhstan. Administratively it is part of the Almaty and Zhambyl regions.

The M36 Highway skirts the range along its northeastern flank.

== Geography ==
The Chu-Ili Range is ancient and heavily eroded. It is part of the Trans-Ili Alatau, a northern extension of the Tian Shan. It begins to the north of Otar, west of the Kurty, one of the main tributaries of the Ili river, and stretches in a roughly northwestern direction for less than 200 kilometers (120 mi). The Chu River flows to the west of the range and to the northeast stretches the Zhusandala Plain and the Taukum desert of the Balkhash-Alakol Basin.

The highest point of the range is Anyrakay (Аңырақай), a 1,294 metres (4,245 ft) high summit. Aitau is a subrange in the northern section. Its highest point is 1,052 metres (3,451 ft) high Sunkar, located in the Khantau Massif, right to the east of Khantau village. The Maizharylgan and the Zhambyl stretch northwestwards from the northern end of the range, parallel to the Zheltau, and the Betpak-Dala desert to the WNW. To the south stretches the Kindyktas, a higher and more massive spur of the northwestern Trans-Ili Alatau. The Ashchysu is the main river having its sources in the range.

== Flora ==
Generally, the mountains of the range have a barren look. The slopes are covered with rough desert-steppe vegetation of sagebrush and fescue. Grasses, tulips, irises and poppies bloom in spring when water flows in the ravines, including Tulipa regelii, a rare species of tulip endemic to the range.

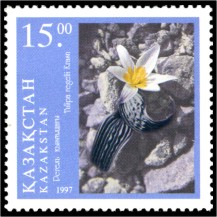
the endemic tulip Tulipa regelii on a postage stamp of Kazakhstan.

== See also ==
- Geography of Kazakhstan
