= Zhambyl =

Zhambyl may refer to:

- Zhambyl Zhabaev, a Kazakh folk poet and singer (akyn), referred to as simply "Zhambyl"
- Taraz (formerly Zhambyl), a city in Kazakhstan
- Zhambyl Province, a province in south-east Kazakhstan
- Zhambyl District, Almaty Region
- Zhambyl District, North Kazakhstan Region
- Zhambyl (mountain), massif in Moiynkum District, Kazakhstan
