= Qanshenggel =

Kanshengel Qanshenggel
- Village
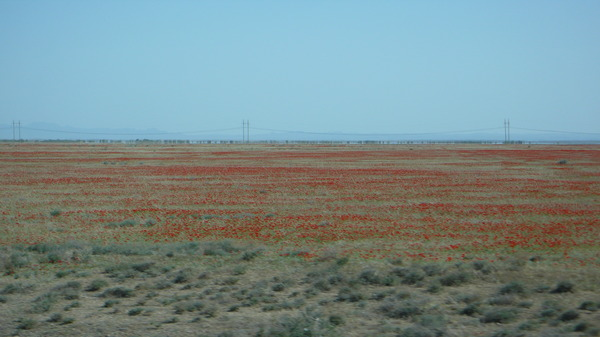

- Location in Kazakhstan
- Coordinates: 44°20′00″N 75°33′00″E
- Country: Kazakhstan
- Region: Almaty Region
- District: Zhambyl District
- Time zone: UTC+6 (Omsk Time)

Kanshengel (Kazakh: Қаншеңгел) is a village in the Almaty Region of south-eastern Kazakhstan.

== Geography ==
Kanshengel is located in the Zhusandala Plain by the M36 Highway.
