= Taukum =

Desert in Kazakhstan

Taukum Тауқұм
- Desert
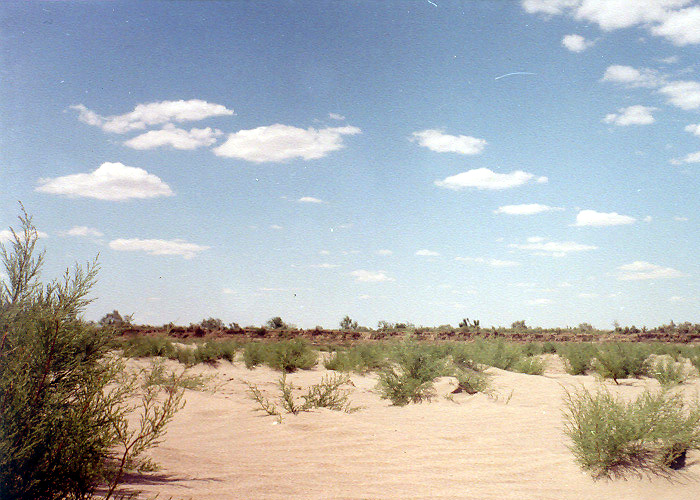
- View of the desert

- Location in Kazakhstan
- Coordinates: 44°59′N 75°01′E
- Location: Kazakhstan
- Part of: Balkhash-Alakol Basin

Area
  - Total: ca 10,000 km^{2} (3,900 sq mi)

Dimensions
  - Length: 240 kilometers (150 mi)
  - Width: 40 kilometers (25 mi) to 60 kilometers (37 mi)

Taukum (Kazakh: Тауқұм) is a desert in the Almaty Region, Kazakhstan.

== Geography ==
Taukum is a sandy desert that is located in the southwestern part of the Balkhash-Alakol Basin. It extends to the south of the lower course of the Ili River, from the southern end of Lake Balkhash to the Bozoi Plateau. The Maizharylgan, part of the Chu-Ili Range rises to the west, and the Zhusandala Plain stretches to the south of the desert. Lake Itishpes lies at the northwestern end. The height of the sand dunes is between 10 meters (33 ft) and 15 meters (49 ft).

== Flora ==
The vegetation between sandy areas is made up of shrubs and grasses typical of arid zones, including sagebrush, saltwort, dzhuzgun, wormwood, saxaul and wheatgrass. There is a narrow stretch of riparian forest by the banks of the Ili river, at the northern limit of the desert.

== See also ==
- Geography of Kazakhstan
