= Zheltau (Jambyl Region) =

Upland in Jambyl Region, Kazakhstan

- Желтау
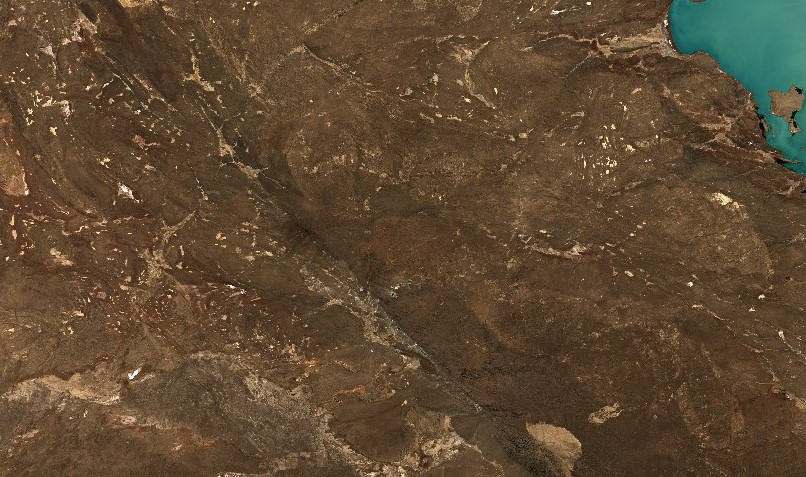
- Sentinel-2 image centered on the Zheltau

Highest point
- Peak: Suykadyr
- Elevation: 599 m (1,965 ft)
- Coordinates: 45°23′53″N 72°33′56″E

Dimensions
- Length: 140 km (87 mi) NW/SE
- Width: 8 km (5.0 mi) NE/SW

Geography
- Location within Kazakhstan
- Location: Kazakhstan
- Range coordinates: 45°00′N 73°00′E
- Parent range: Chu-Ili Range

Geology
- Rock age: Cambrian
- Rock type(s): Gneiss, metamorphic rock and volcanic rock

Climbing
- Easiest route: From Mirny

Zheltau (Kazakh: Желтау) is an elongated upland located in Jambyl Region, Kazakhstan.

Mirny, a mining town in the Moiynkum District, lies at the southeastern end of the Zheltau. The area is a seasonal grazing ground for local cattle.

== Geography ==
Zheltau is located at the western limit of the Balkhash-Alakol Basin, roughly 50 kilometers (31 mi) to the west of the southwestern shore of Lake Balkhash. It extends from northwest to southeast for about 140 kilometers (87 mi). The Betpak-Dala desert lies to the west. The Zheltau stretches northwestwards from the northern end of the Chu-Ili Range, with the Maizharylgan running parallel to its southern stretch. 972 meters (3,189 ft) high Mount Zhambyl rises to the southwest of the southern section of the Zheltau.

The Zheltau upland forms an almost continuous elevated terrain of moderate height. Located near the northern end, 599 meters (1,965 ft) high Mount Suykadyr is the highest point.

== Flora ==
The vast hilly area is covered with resilient grasses such as Festuca, Aristida, Calamagrostis, Artemisia, Anabasis, Salsola and Spiraea. The soil is gray and crumbly owing to high salinity. The average annual precipitation is 220 millimeters (8.7 in).

== See also ==
- Geography of Kazakhstan
