= Itishpes =

Lake in southeastern Kazakhstan

- Итішпес / Итишпес
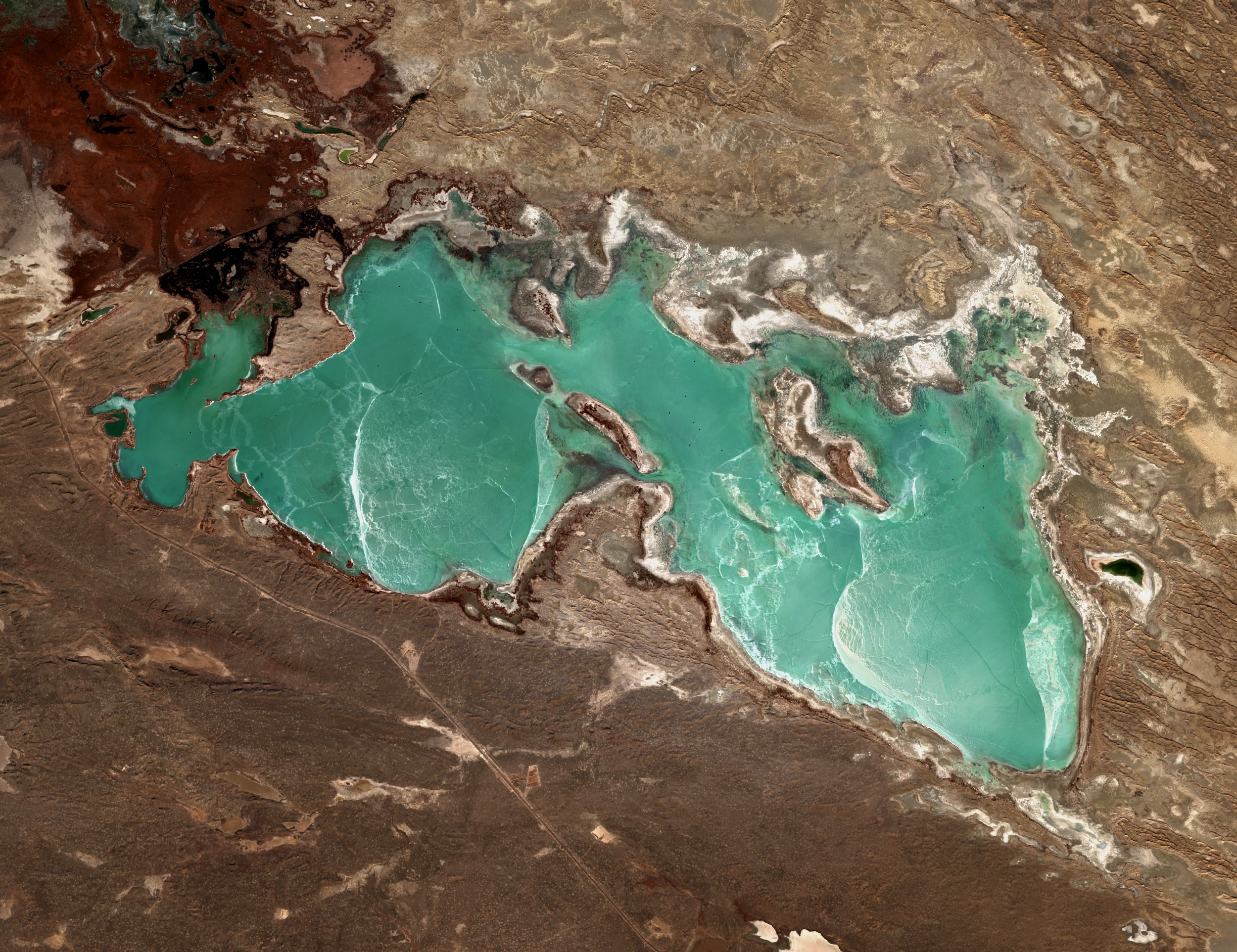
- Sentinel-2 image of the lake in 2021

- Location within Kazakhstan
- Location: Balkhash-Alakol Depression
- Coordinates: 44°52′N 74°17′E
- Type: endorheic
- Basin countries: Kazakhstan
- Max. length: 19 kilometers (12 mi)
- Max. width: 7.2 kilometers (4.5 mi)
- Surface area: 230 square kilometers (89 sq mi)
- Average depth: 0.5 meters (1 ft 8 in)
- Max. depth: 1 meter (3 ft 3 in)
- Surface elevation: 340 meters (1,120 ft)
- Islands: 5

Itishpes (Kazakh: Итішпес; Russian: Итишпес) is a salt lake in the Balkhash-Alakol Basin, part of Balkhash District, Almaty Region, and Moiynkum District, Zhambyl Region, Kazakhstan.

The lake is one of a number of lakes in the region that are known as Alakol. The nearest inhabited places are Burubaytal, Balatopar, Aksuyek and Mirny.

== Geography ==
Itishpes is an endorheic lake of the Balkhash-Alakol Depression. It lies to the south of Shempek Bay, the southernmost area of Lake Balkhash, northwest of the Taukum desert. The border between the Almaty and Zhambyl Regions runs roughly from northwest to southeast across the middle of the lake. The lake has five islands.

River Karasai has its origin in the slopes of the northern section of the Maizharylgan and flows into lake Itishpes from the southwest. In years of exceptional high water, when the level of lake Balkhash may reach 342.5 meters (1,124 ft) Itishpes lake connects in the northwest with the southern end of lake Balkhash.

== Flora ==
The shores of the lake are low and the surrounding landscape flat and without tree growth except for reeds.

== See also ==
- List of lakes of Kazakhstan
