= Maizharylgan =

- Майжарылған
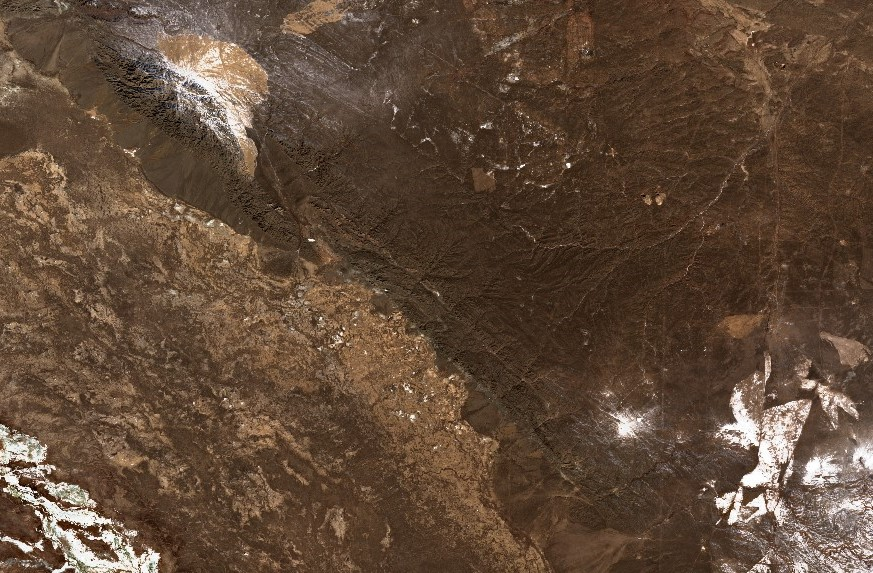
- Sentinel-2 image centered on the Maizharylgan

Highest point
- Elevation: 582 m (1,909 ft)
- Coordinates: 44°24′45″N 72°33′56″E

Dimensions
- Length: 40 km (25 mi) NW/SE
- Width: 18 km (11 mi) NE/SW

Geography
- Location within Kazakhstan
- Location: Kazakhstan
- Range coordinates: 44°30′N 74°00′E
- Parent range: Chu-Ili Range

Geology
- Rock age(s): Lower Paleozoic and Silurian
- Rock type(s): Metamorphic and sedimentary rock

Climbing
- Easiest route: From Mirny

Maizharylgan (Kazakh: Майжарылған; Russian: Горы Майжарылган) is a mountain range located in Jambyl Region, Kazakhstan.

Mirny, a mining town in the Moiynkum District, lies roughly 20 kilometers (12 mi) to the northeast of the Maizharylgan. The area is a seasonal grazing ground for local cattle.

== Geography ==
The Maizharylgan is located at the southwestern limit of the Balkhash-Alakol Basin, roughly 50 kilometers (31 mi) to the southwest of the southern end of Lake Balkhash. It extends from northwest to southeast for about 140 kilometers (87 mi) between the Betpak-Dala desert to the west and the southern section of the Zheltau to the east. River Karasai has its origin in the slopes of the northern section and flows into lake Itishpes (Alakol) to the northeast. The river channels and rivulets carry water only in the spring.

The Maizharylgan stretches northwestwards from the northern end of the Khantau to the southern end of the Zhambyl. he elevations are moderate and, together with the Zheltau upland, the Mayzharylgan forms an almost continuous elevated terrain of moderate height which is part of the northern end of the Chu-Ili Range. The highest point is an unnamed 582 meters (1,909 ft) high summit rising to the southwest of Mirny.

== Flora and fauna ==
The mountains are heavily eroded and cut by ravines. They are surrounded by a desert belt. The soil is gray and crumbly owing to high salinity. Only resilient plants are able to grow in the harsh environment of the Maizharylgan, including Artemisia, Festuca, Caragana and Salsola, among others. Some of the common birds in the range include the Steppe Eagle, the Chukar Partridge and the Turkestan Black Redstart (Phoenicurus ochruros phoenicuroides).

== See also ==
- Geography of Kazakhstan
