= Zhusandala Plain =

Plain in Kazakhstan

Zhusandala Жусандала
- Steppe and semi-desert
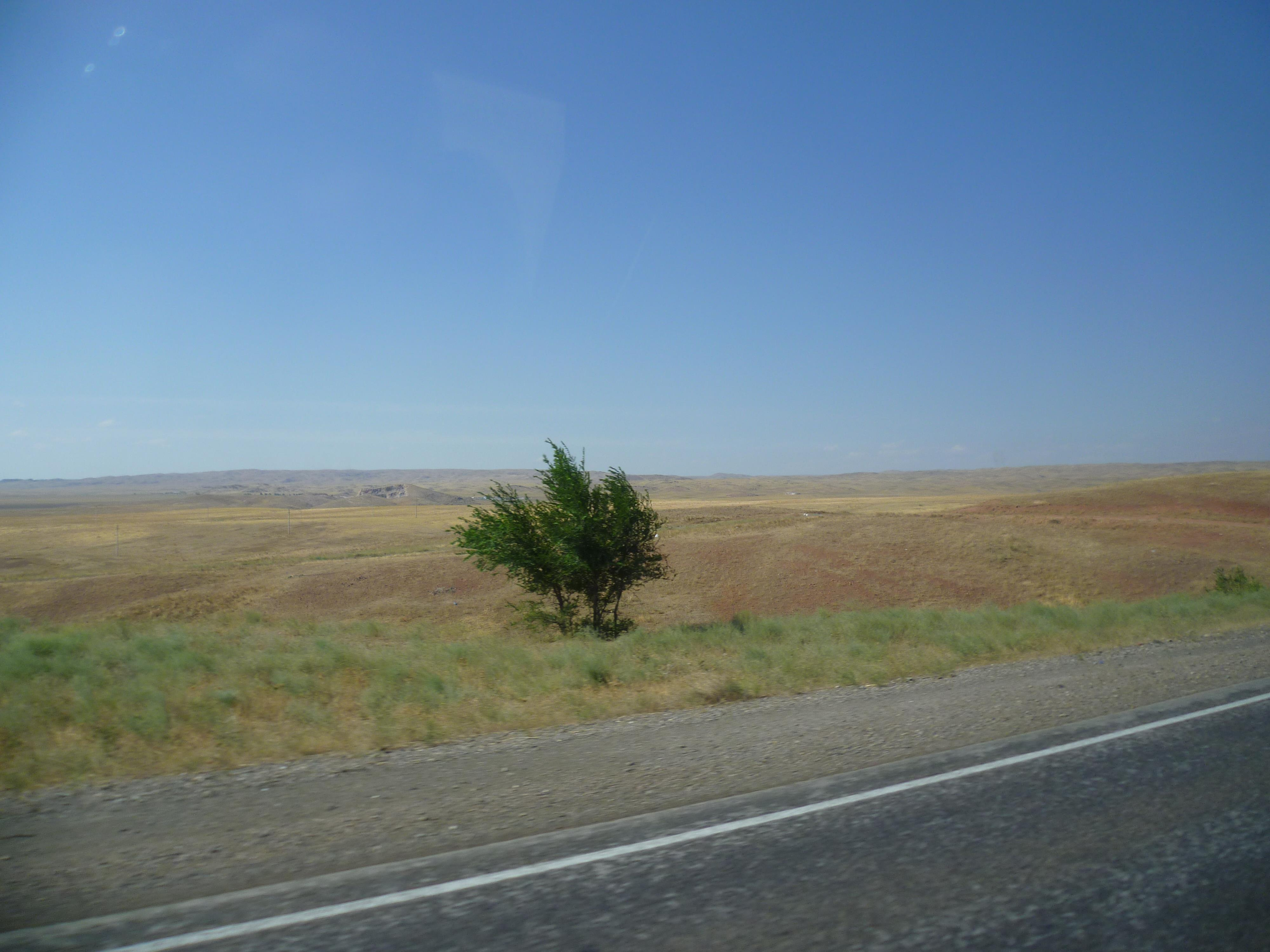
- View of the plain from the road

- Location in Kazakhstan
- Coordinates: 44°18′N 75°15′E
- Location: Kazakhstan

Area
  - Total: 1,880 km^{2} (730 sq mi)

Dimensions
  - Length: 130 km (81 mi)
  - Width: 40 km (25 mi)
- Elevation: 400 m (1,300 ft)

Zhusandala (Kazakh: Жусандала) is a plain in the Balkhash District, Almaty Region and Moiynkum District, Zhambyl Region, Kazakhstan.

The Almaty—Astana M36 Highway passes through the plain. In the 20th century, at the time of the Kazakh SSR, the territory was used as a wintering pasture ground for numerous herds of cattle and overgrazing led to severe depletion of the vegetation. Nowadays the Zhusandala Plain has recovered as grazing has been reduced to a relatively low intensity.

== Geography ==
The plain is elongated, extending from ESE to WNW between the northeastern slopes of the Chu-Ili Range and the southern edge of the Taukum desert. The average annual rainfall is 250 mm (9.8 in). The terrain is dissected by dry river beds. It consists of mostly steppe in the sloping upper elevations near the hills, giving way to semi-desert in zones near the Taukum.

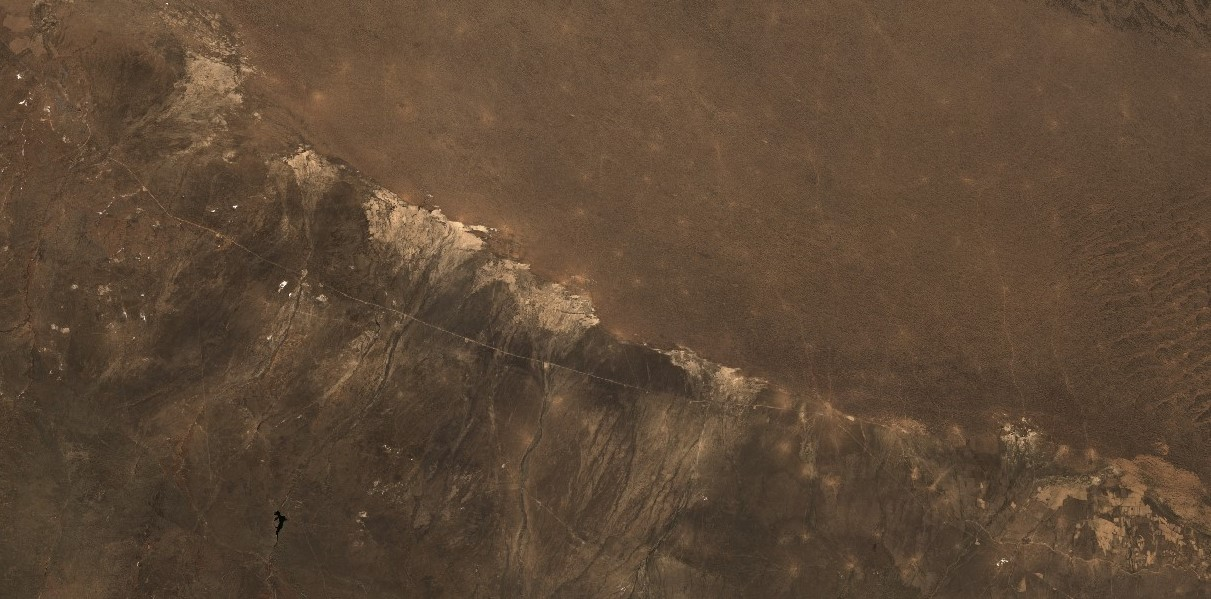
Zhusandala Plain (center) and Taukum (upper right) Sentinel-2 picture.

== Flora and fauna ==
The soil of the plain is gray and crumbly owing to high salinity. There are a few sand dune stretches at the edge of the Taukum. Arid grassland species dominate the vegetation, such as wormwood, feather grass, saltwort, speargrass, Calligonum, Scirpus, sedges, as well as Bromus, including scattered Bromus inermis clumps. Patches of Saxaul, Atraphaxis and tamarisk may grow in the floodplains of the rivers.

The Zhusandala Plain is an important bird area. It is a breeding place for the houbara bustard. Other bird species include the eastern imperial eagle, lesser kestrel, Eurasian stone-curlew, greater sand plover, Caspian plover, Pallas's sandgrouse, black-bellied sandgrouse, greater short-toed lark, Sykes's warbler, Asian desert warbler, desert wheatear and the rufous-tailed scrub robin, among others.

== See also ==
- Geography of Kazakhstan
