= Burubaytal =

Burubaytal Буырылбайтал
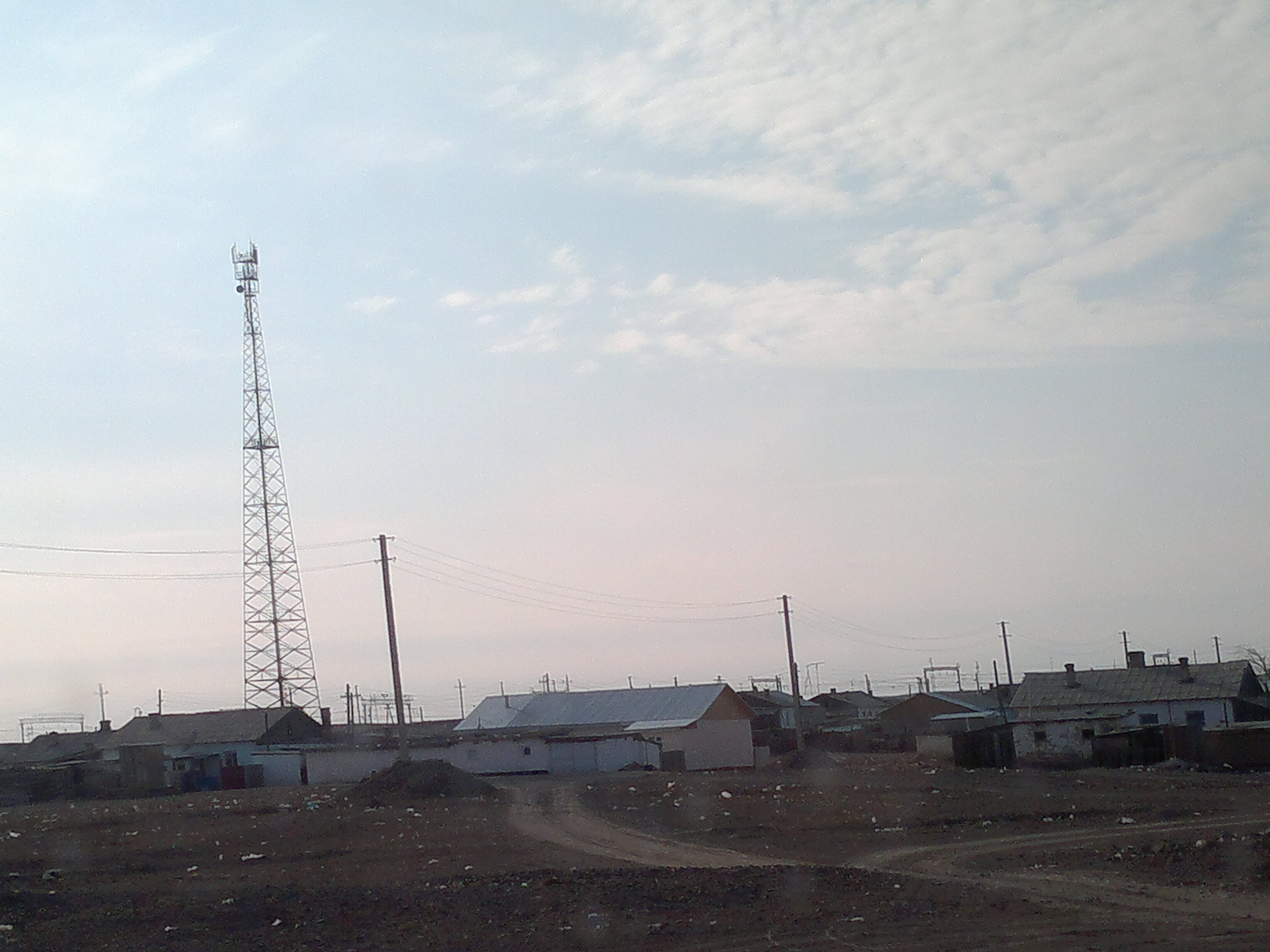

- Location within Kazakhstan
- Coordinates: 44.935°N 74.018°E
- Country: Kazakhstan
- Regions of Kazakhstan: Jambyl Region
- Districts of Kazakhstan: Moiynkum District

Population (2009)
  - Total: 336

Burubaytal (Kazakh: Буырылбайтал, Buyrylbaital) is a town located in the Moiynkum District, Jambyl Region, Kazakhstan. The European route E125 passes by the town.

== Demographics ==
According to the 2009 Kazakhstani Census, the town has a population of 336 people (162 men and 174 women).

As of 1999, the town had a population of 264 people (132 men and 132 women).

== Geography ==
The town is located 15 kilometers (9.3 mi) to the northwest of the northern shore of lake Itishpes.
