= Khantau (village) =

Khantau Хантау
- village
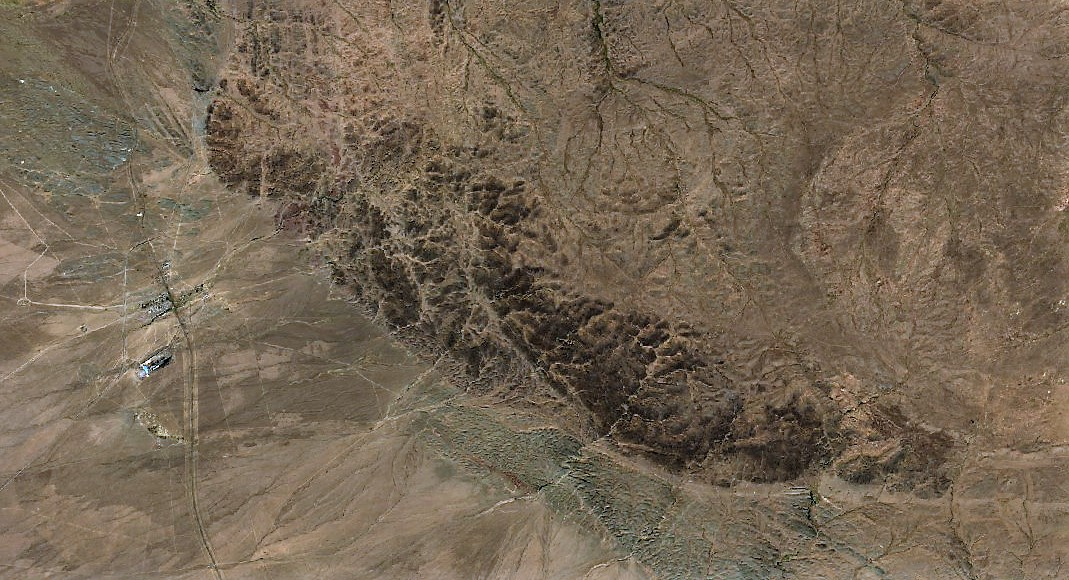
- Satellite view of Khantau to the west of the massif of the same name

- Location within Kazakhstan
- Coordinates: 44°13′37″N 73°47′44″E
- Country: Kazakhstan
- Regions of Kazakhstan: Zhambyl Region
- Districts of Kazakhstan: Moiynkum District

Population (2021)
  - Total: 1,029
- Time zone: UTC+6 (East Kazakhstan Time)
- Post code: 150100080622

Khantau (Kazakh: Хантау) is a village located in the Moiynkum District, Zhambyl Region, Kazakhstan. It is the head of Khantau rural district (КАТО code — 315649100).

== Demographics ==
According to the 2009 Kazakhstan census, the town has a population of 978 (480 men and 498 women). As of 1999, the town had a population of 925 (468 men and 457 women).

== Geography ==
The town is located near the western slopes of the Khantau massif, part of the Aitau range, 42 kilometers (26 mi) to the south of Mirny and 68 kilometers (42 mi) to the east of Moiynkum, the district capital.

=== Climate ===
Climate data for Khantau (1991–2020)
Month	Jan	Feb	Mar	Apr	May	Jun	Jul	Aug	Sep	Oct	Nov	Dec	Year
Daily mean °C (°F)	−3.9 (25.0)	−1.6 (29.1)	5.2 (41.4)	13.2 (55.8)	19.5 (67.1)	25.4 (77.7)	27.4 (81.3)	25.9 (78.6)	19.7 (67.5)	11.8 (53.2)	3.2 (37.8)	−2.3 (27.9)	11.9 (53.4)
Average precipitation mm (inches)	17.8 (0.70)	20.3 (0.80)	17.5 (0.69)	25.6 (1.01)	21.1 (0.83)	14.9 (0.59)	9.9 (0.39)	6.7 (0.26)	6.4 (0.25)	17.7 (0.70)	23.7 (0.93)	20.5 (0.81)	202.1 (7.96)
Source: NOAA
