= Ulanbel =

Ulanbel Ұланбел
- Village
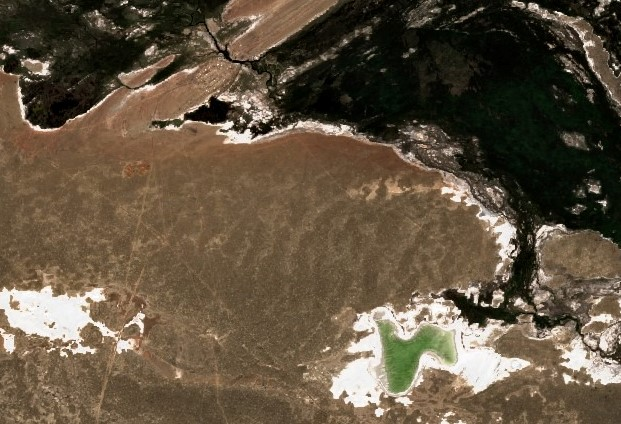
- Ulanbel village (upper left) and lake Zhalanash (lower right) Sentinel-2 image

- Location in Kazakhstan
- Coordinates: 44°49′30″N 71°00′15″E
- Country: Kazakhstan
- Region: Jambyl Region
- District: Moiynkum District

Population (2009)
  - Total: 1,047
- Time zone: UTC+6 (East Kazakhstan Time)
- Post code: 080621

Ulanbel (Kazakh: Ұланбел) is a village in Moiynkum District, Jambyl Region, Kazakhstan. It is the administrative center of the Ulanbel Rural District (KATO code - 315647100). Population: 1,047 (2009 census results); 1,455 (1999 census results).

== Geography ==
The village lies at the northern edge of the Moiynkum Desert. It is located by the left bank of the lower course of the Chu river, 8 kilometers (5.0 mi) to the northwest of lake Zhalanash and 154 kilometers (96 mi) to the WNW of Moiynkum, the district capital.

=== Climate ===
Ulanbel has a cold desert climate (Köppen: BWk), characterized by cold winters and hot summers.

Climate data for Ulanbel (1991–2020)
Month	Jan	Feb	Mar	Apr	May	Jun	Jul	Aug	Sep	Oct	Nov	Dec	Year
Mean daily maximum °C (°F)	−3.7 (25.3)	−0.2 (31.6)	9.4 (48.9)	20.0 (68.0)	26.9 (80.4)	32.9 (91.2)	34.7 (94.5)	33.3 (91.9)	26.6 (79.9)	18.0 (64.4)	6.8 (44.2)	−1.4 (29.5)	16.9 (62.4)
Daily mean °C (°F)	−8.3 (17.1)	−5.3 (22.5)	3.3 (37.9)	13.1 (55.6)	19.8 (67.6)	25.4 (77.7)	27.2 (81.0)	25.1 (77.2)	18.1 (64.6)	9.6 (49.3)	0.6 (33.1)	−6.1 (21.0)	10.2 (50.4)
Mean daily minimum °C (°F)	−12.2 (10.0)	−9.3 (15.3)	−1.3 (29.7)	7.2 (45.0)	12.8 (55.0)	17.4 (63.3)	18.9 (66.0)	16.6 (61.9)	9.9 (49.8)	2.6 (36.7)	−4.2 (24.4)	−9.9 (14.2)	4.0 (39.2)
Average precipitation mm (inches)	14.5 (0.57)	14.5 (0.57)	18.5 (0.73)	18.2 (0.72)	18.3 (0.72)	8.4 (0.33)	6.7 (0.26)	4.5 (0.18)	2.0 (0.08)	11.7 (0.46)	18.8 (0.74)	15.6 (0.61)	151.7 (5.97)
Average precipitation days (≥ 1.0 mm)	3.6	3.7	4.0	3.8	3.2	2.1	1.6	0.9	0.3	2.4	3.6	4.1	33.3
Source: NOAA
