= Mirny, Kazakhstan =

Mirny Мирный
- village
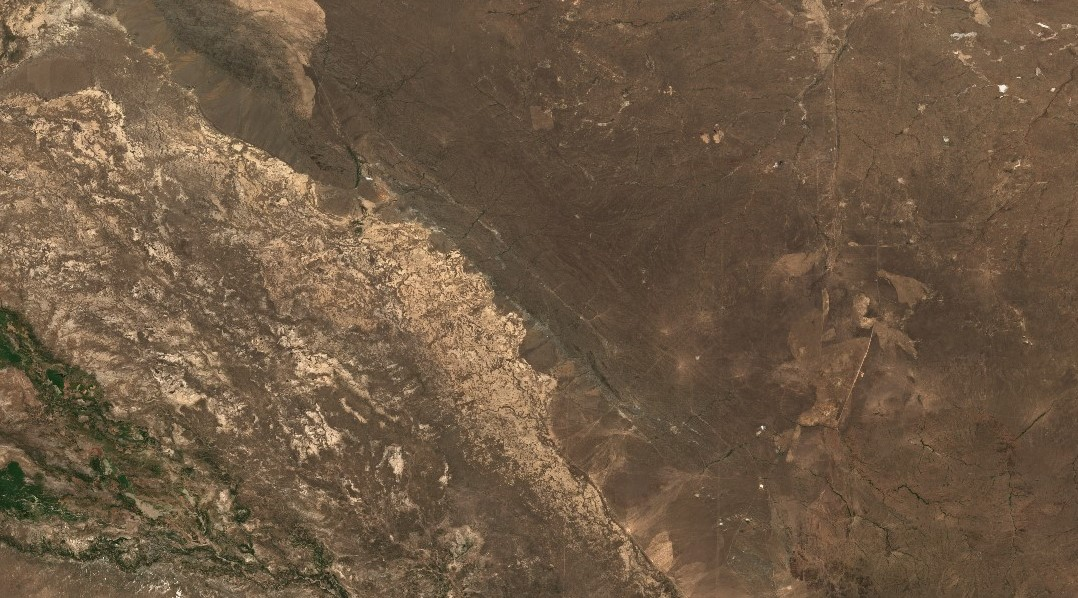
- Satellite view of the Maizharylgan area with Mirny in the upper right corner.

- Location within Kazakhstan
- Coordinates: 44°40′06″N 73°51′24″E
- Country: Kazakhstan
- Regions of Kazakhstan: Zhambyl Region
- Districts of Kazakhstan: Moiynkum District

Population (2009)
  - Total: 841
- Time zone: UTC+6 (East Kazakhstan Time)
- Post code: 080617

Mirny (Kazakh: Мирный) is a town located in the Moiynkum District, Zhambyl Region, Kazakhstan. Since 2013 it is part of Khantau rural district (КАТО code — 315641100).

== Demographics ==
According to the 2009 Kazakhstan census, the town has a population of 841 (400 men and 441 women).

As of 1999, the town had a population of 1824 people (878 men and 946 women).

== Geography ==
The town is located 84 kilometers (52 mi) to the northeast of Moiynkum, the district capital, and 42 kilometers (26 mi) to the north of Khantau. It lies near the southern end of the Zheltau, 30 kilometers (19 mi) to the southwest of the shores of lake Itishpes.
