= Balatopar =

- Location in Kazakhstan
- Coordinates: 45°03′07″N 74°36′58″E
- Country: Kazakhstan
- Region: Almaty Region

Population (2009)
  - Total: 1,918
- Time zone: UTC+6 (Omsk Time)
- Postcode: 040306

Balatopar is a village in Almaty Region of south-eastern Kazakhstan. It is the administrative center of the Balatopar rural district (KATO code - 193659100). Population: 1,918 (2009 census results); 1,836 (1999 census results).

== Geography ==
The village is located 15 kilometers (9.3 mi) to the northeast of the northern shore of lake Itishpes.
