= Kashkanteniz =

Lake in Kazakhstan

- Қашқантеңіз
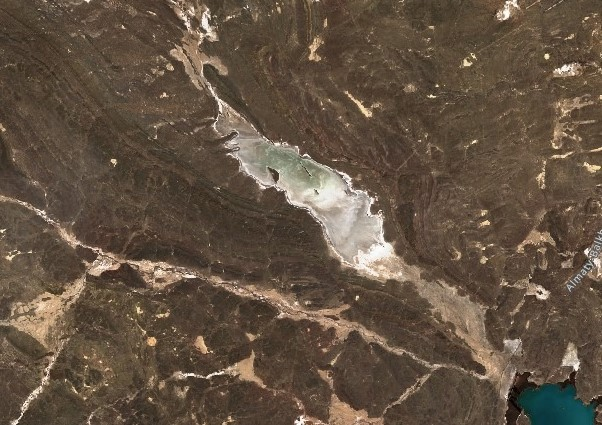
- Sentinel-2 image of the lake in April

- Location within Kazakhstan
- Location: Moiynkum District
- Coordinates: 45°56′11″N 73°18′28″E
- Type: salt lake
- Basin countries: Kazakhstan
- Max. length: 22.5 kilometers (14.0 mi)
- Max. width: 4.3 kilometers (2.7 mi)
- Surface area: 18.5 square kilometers (7.1 sq mi)
- Average depth: 1.4 meters (4 ft 7 in)
- Islands: yes

Kashkanteniz (Kazakh: Қашқантеңіз) is a lake in the Moiynkum District, Jambyl Region, Kazakhstan.

The lake is located 10 kilometers (6.2 mi) to the NNW of Kashkanteniz railway station.

== Geography ==
Kashkanteniz lies inland from the western coast of Lake Balkhash, about 4 kilometers (2.5 mi) from Kashkanteniz Bay inner shore. The lake stretches roughly from northwest to southeast for more than 22 kilometers (14 mi). Its shores are flat and marshy and the water of the lake is salty. In the past it had been connected with Lake Balkhash.

Kashkanteniz freezes over in mid-November and thaws in March. On average its surface increases right after the melting of the snows in the spring. The lake may dry up completely in the summer. Sometimes strong winds blowing from the northeast spray Balkhash surface water that reaches the marshes at the southern end of the lake.

== See also ==
- List of lakes of Kazakhstan
