= Zhalanash (lake) =

Lake in Kazakhstan

- Жалаңаш
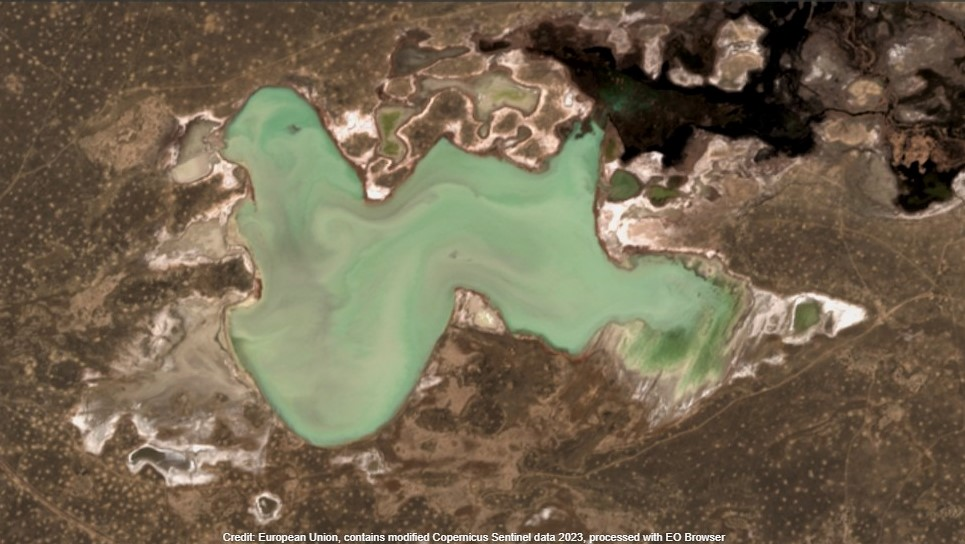
- Sentinel-2 image of the lake in April

- Location within Kazakhstan
- Location: Moiynkum District
- Coordinates: 44°45′N 71°12′E
- Type: salt lake
- Basin countries: Kazakhstan
- Max. length: 2.5 kilometers (1.6 mi)
- Max. width: 1.2 kilometers (0.75 mi)
- Surface area: 3 square kilometers (1.2 sq mi)
- Average depth: 1.5 meters (4 ft 11 in)
- Shore length^{1}: 12.5 kilometers (7.8 mi)
- Surface elevation: 261 meters (856 ft)
- ^{1} Shore length is not a well-defined measure.

Zhalanash (Kazakh: Жалаңаш) is a salt lake in the Moiynkum District, Jambyl Region, Kazakhstan.

Ulanbel village is located 8 kilometers (5.0 mi) to the northwest. The lake basin is used as a seasonal grazing ground for local cattle.

== Geography ==
Zhalanash lies at the northern edge of the Moiynkum Desert, in the lower Chu river basin. It is located less than 3 kilometers (1.9 mi) to the south of the Chu river channel, and 55 kilometers (34 mi) downriver from a larger lake Kokuydynkol. Both lakes are located on the left side of the Chu channel. The shores of Zhalanash are low and flat.

Zhalanash is known as a "dead lake" (Kazakh: тұйық көл) in Kazakh. Its waters freeze at the end of December and thaw at the end of March. On average the water level rises right after the melting of the snows in the spring and decreases in the summer.

== See also ==
- List of lakes of Kazakhstan
