= Moiynkum Desert =

Desert in Kazakhstan

Moiynkum Мойынқұм
- Desert
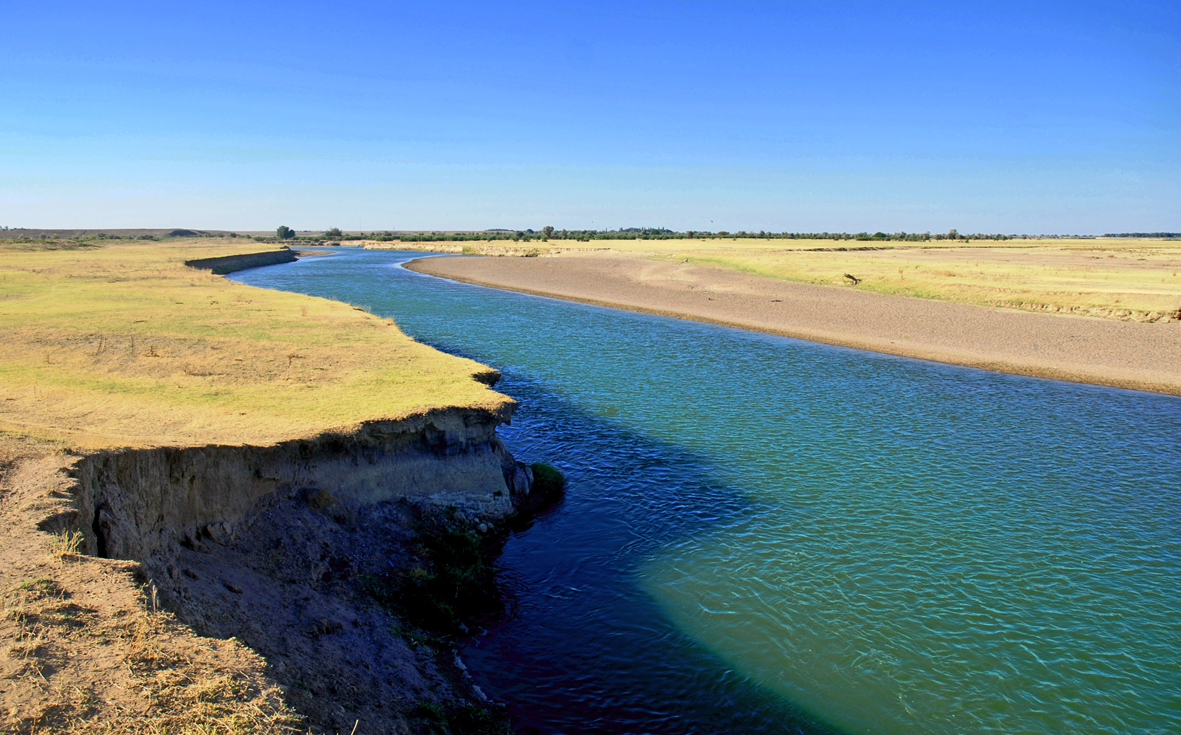
- View of the Chu river at the edge of the desert

- Location in Kazakhstan
- Coordinates: 43°53′N 71°52′E
- Location: Kazakhstan / Kyrgyzstan
- Part of: Turkistan and Zhambyl regions

Area
  - Total: 37,500 km^{2} (14,500 sq mi)
- Elevation: 300 meters (980 ft) to 700 meters (2,300 ft)

The Moiynkum Desert (Kazakh: Мойынқұм, Moiynqūm), is a desert in the Turkistan and Zhambyl regions of southern Kazakhstan.

Common plant types in the desert include saksaul, milkvetch, mugwort and sedge. The Andasay State Nature Reserve is a 1,000,000 hectares (2,500,000 acres) protected area that was established in 1966.

== Geography ==
The Moiynkum Desert is limited by the Chu River to the north and east and the Karatau and Kyrgyz Ala-Too mountain ranges to the south and southeast. Its elevation ranges from 300 meters (980 ft) in the northern sector to 700 meters (2,300 ft) in the southeast. River Chu flows at the northern edge of the desert, with lakes Kokuydynkol and Zhalanash close to the left side of its channel. In wet years the Chu may reach the endorheic salt lake Akzhaykyn in the Ashchykol Depression, at the western end of the desert. The Akzhar lake group is located in the southern area.

== Climate ==
The climate of the desert is continental. Temperatures drop as low as −40 °C (−40 °F) in January and rise to around 50 °C (120 °F) in July.

== Mining ==
The desert is known to harbor deposits of uranium, with the South Inkai mine of Uranium One, the tenth largest uranium producing mine in the world, and the Inkai Uranium Project of Cameco. The uranium mines at Tortkuduk and Moiynkum are operated by the Franco-Kazakh firm KATCO.

== See also ==
- Geography of Kazakhstan
- Moiynkum District
