= Mynjylky mountain plateau =

Plateau in Kazakhstan

Coordinates: 43°05′N 77°04′E

Mynjylky
- The plateau and its mudflow dam seen from Tuyuksu Gate peak (2022)

Highest point
- Elevation: 3,000 m (9,800 ft)

Naming
- English translation: a thousand mares
- Language of name: Kazakh

Geography
- Location within Kazakhstan
- Location: Kazakhstan, Almaty Region

Geology
- Mountain type: plateau

The Mynjylky (Kazakh: Мыңжылқы, romanized: Myñjylqy, IPA: [məŋ(d)ʑəɫqʰə́]) is a plateau in an elevated plain in the Almaty Region of Kazakhstan.

== Geography ==
The plateau is located at the source of Little Almaatinka river, 28 km (17 mi) south of Almaty. The tract is surrounded by Tuyuksu glaciers. The river is blocked by an anti-mudflow dam. Next to the dam is the hydrometeorological station Mynj, which has been conducting observations since 1936.

The plateau has an undulating surface bounded by distinct ledges from neighboring plains. The name, translated from the Kazakh language, means "a thousand mares," indicating a place suitable for grazing horses. On the northern slopes of the Zailiisky Alatau mountain range, the Mynjylky Mountain Plateau is the source of the Malaya Almatinka river. From Mynjylky one can climb to the glaciological station Tuyuksu-1 (3400 m), to Alpengrad (3450 m), from which climbers can make ascents to the peaks of Maloalmatinsky node and Titova pass (3630 m).

The Mynjylky plateau is a wide flat valley with steep slopes, and is surrounded by glaciers. It is about 4 kilometers long. A weather station and a dam are there. The alpine meadows and the large moraine ridge of the Tuyuksu glacier behind the dam are visible.

It offers a panorama of the central part of the Tuyuksu glacier and the Kumbel spur in the west, where the tops of Lokomotiv, Kosmodemyanskaya, Molodezhnaya, and Titova are located. Three passes access Kumbel spur: Lokomotiv and Molodezhny, leading to Kumbelsu Gorge, and Titova pass, leading to Gorelnik Gorge.

Bogdanovich glacier is accessible from the plateau and gives rise to Sauruksai river, which flows into Left Talgar river. Manshuk Mametova pass leads to Left Talgar gorge on the "Sunny glade". "Alpingrad ascents" access the peaks of Amangeldy, the Pioneer-Teacher array, Panfilov Heroes, Manshuk Mametova, Antikainen, and moraine lake No. 6.

The mountain's average annual temperature is -2.7 degrees. On average, there are 237 days a year with snow, and precipitation falls 743 millimeters a year.

== Protection and visit ==
The Ile-Alatau National Park Administration is responsible for the preservation and protection of the plateau. The recommended visiting period is May through October. The route is avalanche-prone after snowfall and in the spring.

== Sources ==
- Ivashchenko A. A. Reserves and national parks of Kazakhstan. — Almaty: "Almatykitap", 2006. - Pp. 216-223. - 281 p.
- Ile-Alatau state national natural Park. - Almaty, 2015. - Pp. 25-26. - 208 p.
- Ismetova, Danara (23 November 2020). "Glacier melting threatens the future water supply of Kazakhstan's largest city". Climate Tracker.
