= Karagiye =

Karst trench in Kazakhstan

Qaraqia oiysy
- Karagiye Mountain Trench, Karagiye Depression
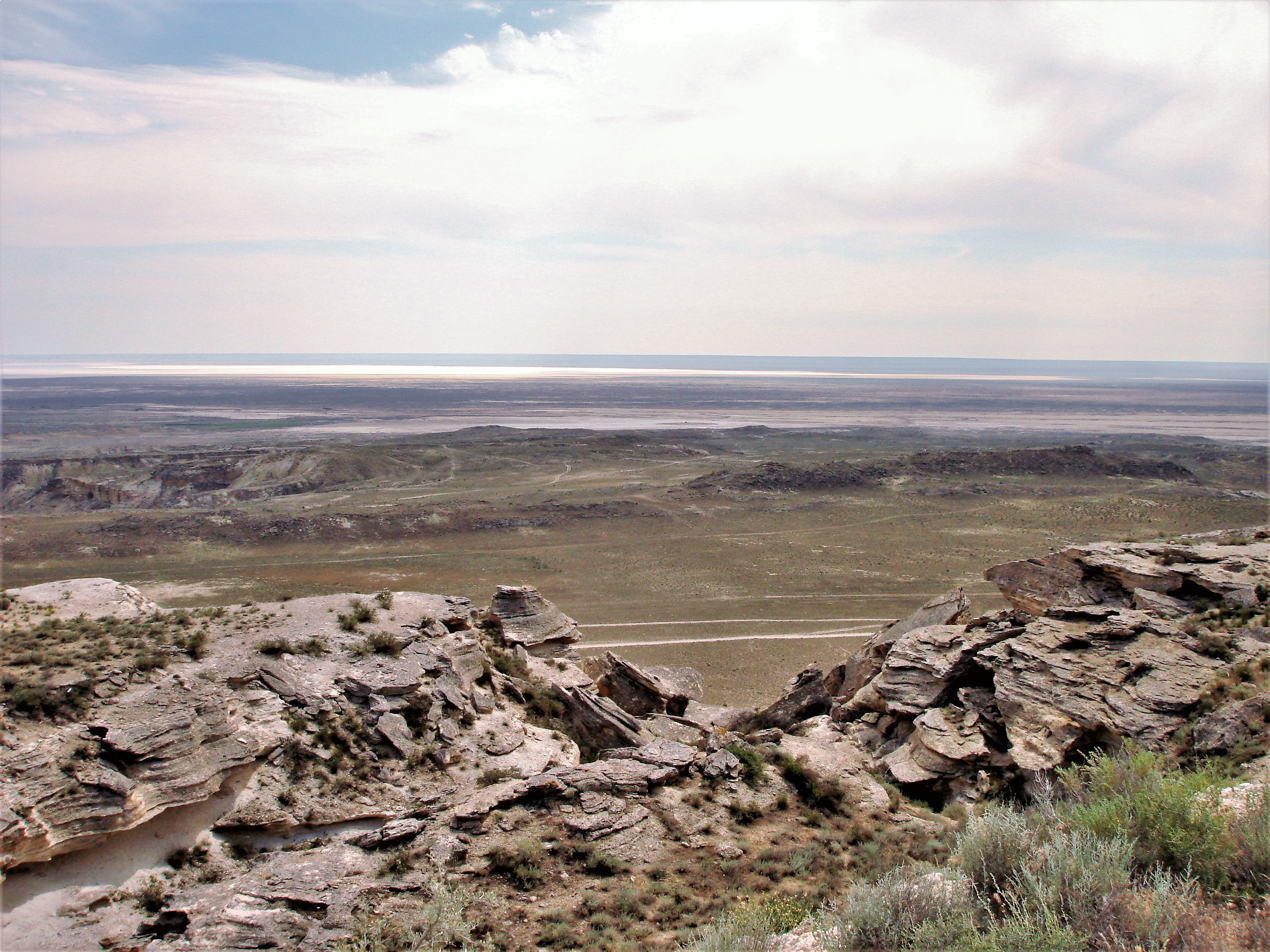
- View of Karagiye Depression

- Location within Kazakhstan
- Floor elevation: -134 m
- Length: 40 km
- Width: 10 km

Geology
- Type: Karst

Geography
- Location: Mangyshlak Peninsula, Kazakhstan
- Coordinates: 43°24′0″N 51°47′24″E
- Interactive map of Qaraqia oiysy

Karagiye (Kazakh: Qaraqia; lit. "Black Jaw") is a 40 kilometres (25 mi)-long karst trench close to the Caspian Sea. At its lowest point at Vpadina Kaundy, it is approximately 134 metres (440 ft) below sea level. It is the lowest point in Central Asia, Kazakhstan, and the former Soviet Union. It is also known as the Karagiye Depression and Karagiye Mountain Trench.

The trench was formed as soluble limestone, dolomite and gypsum dissolved forming potholes, funnels and caves that eventually collapsed. Today the trench features many scarps and offsets and generates long rain clouds caused by the air rising above it. There is a vernal lake in the south-west of the trench and a stream rising from a drilled well that disappears back into the ground within the trench.

The trench is inhabited by mouflon, corsac, snakes, hares and vultures. It is the only place within the Mangyshlak Peninsula where mushrooms grow and these are collected by locals.

== See also ==
- Karakiya District
- Caspian Depression
- List of countries by lowest point
- List of places on land with elevations below sea level
