= Moiynkum =

Moiynkum Мойынқұм
- village
- Location within Kazakhstan
- Coordinates: 44°17′9″N 72°56′14″E
- Country: Kazakhstan
- Region: Jambyl Region
- District: Moiynkum District

Population (2009)
  - Total: 8,463
- Time zone: UTC+6

Moiynkum (Kazakh: Мойынқұм; until 1997 Furmanovka) is a village (auyl) in southeastern Kazakhstan. It is the seat of Moiynkum District of Jambyl Region. Population: 8,463 (2009 census results).

== Geography ==
The village is located by the Chu river, 80 kilometers (50 mi) to the southeast of lake Kokuydynkol. It lies at the northeastern edge of the Moiynkum Desert.

=== Climate ===
Moiynkum has a steppe climate (Köppen: BSk), with hot summers and cold winters.

Climate data for Moiynkum (1991–2020)
| Month | Jan | Feb | Mar | Apr | May | Jun | Jul | Aug | Sep | Oct | Nov | Dec | Year |
|---|---|---|---|---|---|---|---|---|---|---|---|---|---|
| Mean daily maximum °C (°F) | −1.7 (28.9) | 1.8 (35.2) | 11.0 (51.8) | 20.8 (69.4) | 27.4 (81.3) | 32.8 (91.0) | 34.5 (94.1) | 33.0 (91.4) | 26.9 (80.4) | 18.8 (65.8) | 8.1 (46.6) | 0.1 (32.2) | 17.8 (64.0) |
| Daily mean °C (°F) | −7.2 (19.0) | −4.1 (24.6) | 4.1 (39.4) | 13.1 (55.6) | 19.3 (66.7) | 24.6 (76.3) | 26.2 (79.2) | 24.4 (75.9) | 17.9 (64.2) | 10.1 (50.2) | 1.4 (34.5) | −5.3 (22.5) | 10.4 (50.7) |
| Mean daily minimum °C (°F) | −11.8 (10.8) | −8.8 (16.2) | −1.5 (29.3) | 5.8 (42.4) | 10.8 (51.4) | 15.3 (59.5) | 16.8 (62.2) | 15.1 (59.2) | 9.0 (48.2) | 2.6 (36.7) | −3.9 (25.0) | −9.7 (14.5) | 3.3 (37.9) |
| Average precipitation mm (inches) | 19.8 (0.78) | 19.9 (0.78) | 17.1 (0.67) | 20.7 (0.81) | 19.6 (0.77) | 15.8 (0.62) | 10.7 (0.42) | 4.9 (0.19) | 5.5 (0.22) | 16.6 (0.65) | 22.5 (0.89) | 20.4 (0.80) | 193.5 (7.62) |
| Average precipitation days (≥ 1.0 mm) | 4.9 | 4.6 | 4.1 | 4.6 | 4.2 | 3.2 | 2.4 | 1.2 | 1.4 | 3.1 | 4.7 | 4.8 | 43.2 |
Source: NOAA
