= Betpak-Dala =

Semidesert in Kazakhstan

Betpak-Dala Бетпақдала / Бетпак-Дала
- Desert
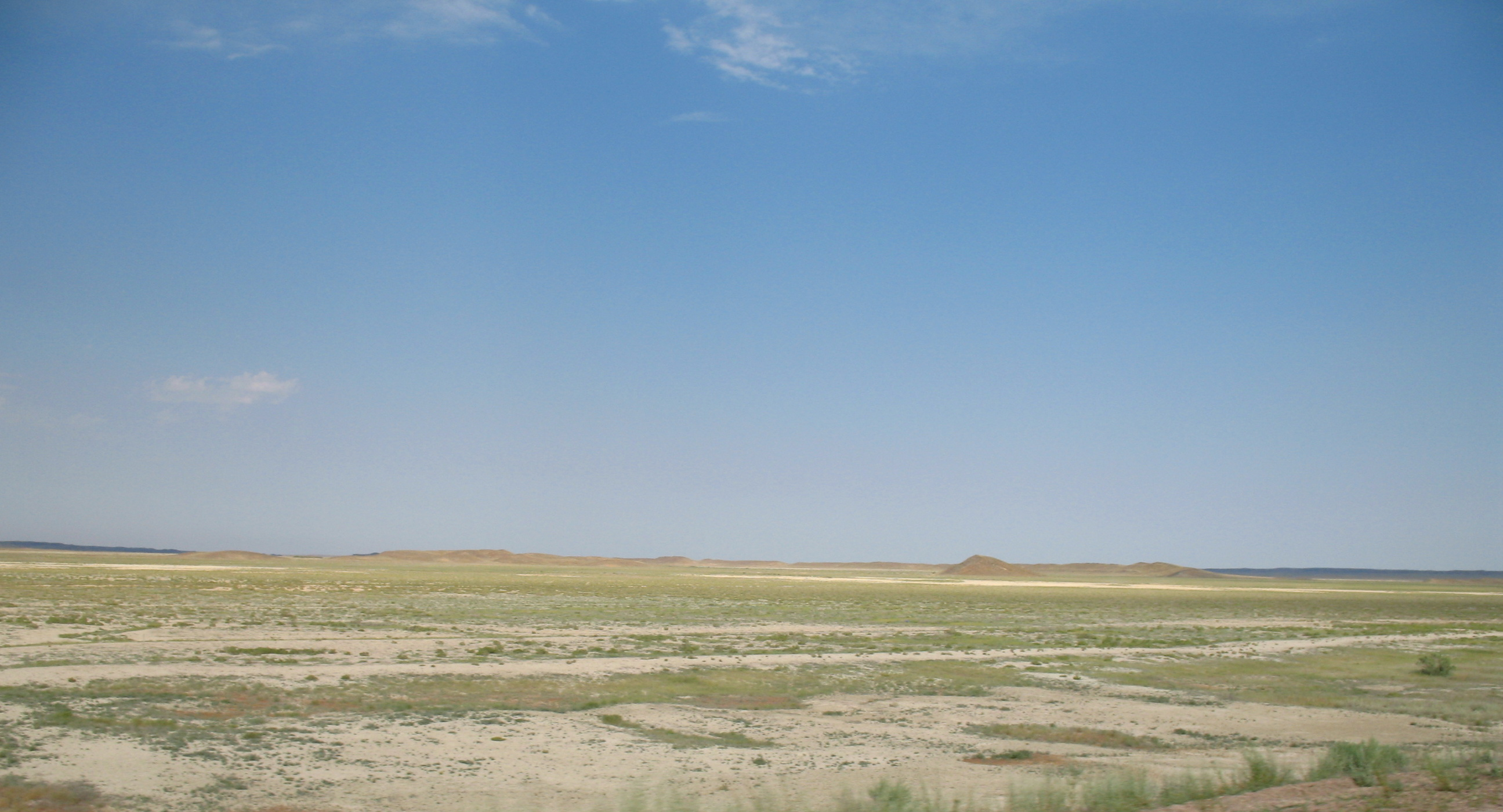
- Panorama of the desert area

- Location within Kazakhstan
- Coordinates: 46°02′N 70°12′E

Area
  - Total: 75,000 km^{2} (29,000 sq mi)

Dimensions
  - Length: 500 kilometers (310 mi)
  - Width: 170 kilometers (110 mi)
- Elevation: 300 meters (980 ft) - 500 meters (1,600 ft)
- Highest elevation: 974 meters (3,196 ft) (Zhambil (Жамбъл))

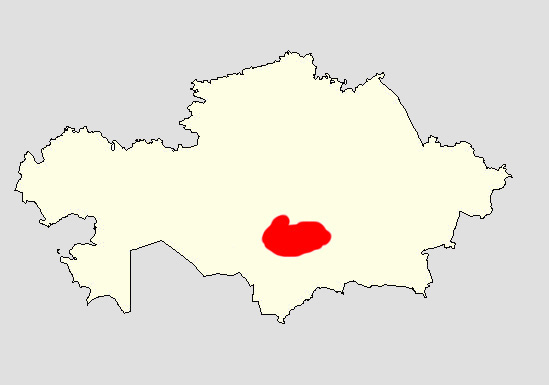
Betpak-Dala in Kazakhstan

Betpak-Dala or Betpaqdala (Kazakh: Бетпақдала, Betpaqdala; from Turkic batpak, “swampy,” or Persian bedbaht, “unlucky” and Turkic dala, “plain”; Russian: Бетпак-Дала or Сeверная Голодная степь, lit. Hungry Steppe) is a desert zone in the Ulytau, Karaganda, Turkestan, and Zhambyl regions, Kazakhstan.

== History ==
In Autumn 2014, English explorer Jamie Bunchuk completed an expedition to cross the Betpak-Dala to its fullest longitudinal extent, from Lake Balkash in the east to the Sarysu River in the west. He also ran 190 miles, nearly eight marathons, back-to-back, over the course of eight days within the region.

An epizootic of pasteurellosis occurred in Betpak-Dala in May 2015, in which more than 120,000 saiga antelope — representing more than a third of the global population — were confirmed dead.

== Geography ==
The Betpak-Dala is located between the lower reaches of the Sarysu River, the Chu River, and Lake Balkhash. In the north, near the 46°30’ parallel, Betpak-Dala borders on the Kazakh Uplands, an area of low, rounded, isolated hills. Its area is approximately 75,000 square kilometres (29,000 sq mi). To the southwest lies the Ashchykol Depression. The desert is a flat, gently rolling plain with an elevation ranging from 300 metres (980 ft) to 350 metres (1,150 ft) and a general south-western incline. Elevations are greatest in the east. In the southeast, the Zheltau highland reaches an elevation of 599 metres (1,965 ft) at Mount Suykadyr (Суықадыр) and of 972 metres (3,189 ft) at Mount Kyzylbelen (Кызылбелен).

The western part of Betpak-Dala is composed of folded Mesozoic rock and horizontally layered Paleogene friable rock (sand, sandstone, clay, and conglomerates). The eastern hilly region has a plicate structure and is composed of Lower Paleozoic sedimentary-metamorphic rock series and granite. The climate is sharply continental. The annual precipitation is between 100 millimetres (3.9 in) and 150 millimetres (5.9 in), of which only 15 percent occurs in summer. Summers are dry and hot; winters are cold with little snow. The average temperature in January ranges from −12 °C (10 °F) to −14 °C (7 °F), and the average temperature in July ranges from 24 °C (75 °F) to 26 °C (79 °F).

There are many shallow, often Sor-type of saline lakes, such as Arys, Buralkynyn Tuzy and Karakoin. Underground waters, emerging in places, are abundant. The predominant soils are gray-brown desert solonchak and solonets.

== Flora ==
The western region of Betpak-Dala is an argillaceous sagebrush desert; Anabasis salsa grows in the salt-marsh depressions, while Pamirian winterfat (Krascheninnikovia ceratoides) and Siberian pea shrub (Caragana arborescens) grow on the sand dunes. In the east the argillaceous desert merges with the stony desert where Salsola arbuscula grows on the rocky hills. Betpak-Dala is used as a spring and autumn grazing land.

== See also ==
- Geography of Kazakhstan
- Mirzachoʻl, known in Russian as the Golodnaya Steppe (lit. Hungry Steppe)
