= Geography of Kazakhstan =

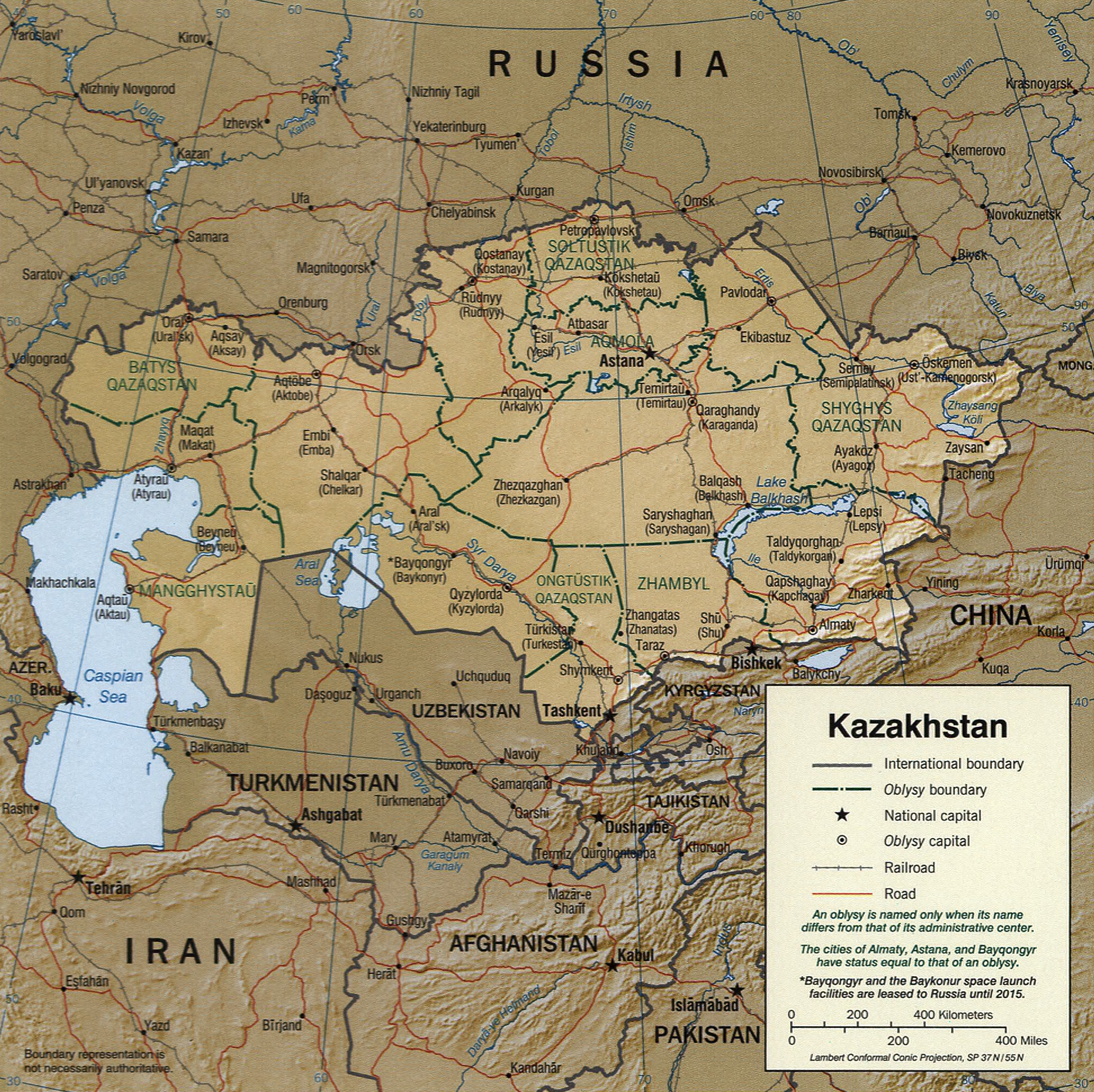
- Continent: Asia, Europe
- Region: Central Asia
- Area
  - Total: 2,724,900 km^{2} (1,052,100 sq mi)
- Coastline: 1,422 km (884 mi)
- Highest point: Khan Tengri; 7,010 m
- Lowest point: Karagiye -134 m
- Longest river: Irtysh
- Largest lake: Lake Balkhash
- Climate: Cold Semi-arid climate Cold Desert climate

Kazakhstan is located in Central Asia, with a small portion in Eastern Europe. With an area of about 2,724,900 square kilometers (1,052,100 sq mi) Kazakhstan is the ninth largest country in the world, more than twice the combined size of the other four Central Asian states and 60% larger than Alaska. The country borders Turkmenistan, Uzbekistan, and Kyrgyzstan to the south; Russia to the north; Russia and the Caspian Sea to the west; and China's Xinjiang Uygur Autonomous Region to the east.

== Area and boundaries ==
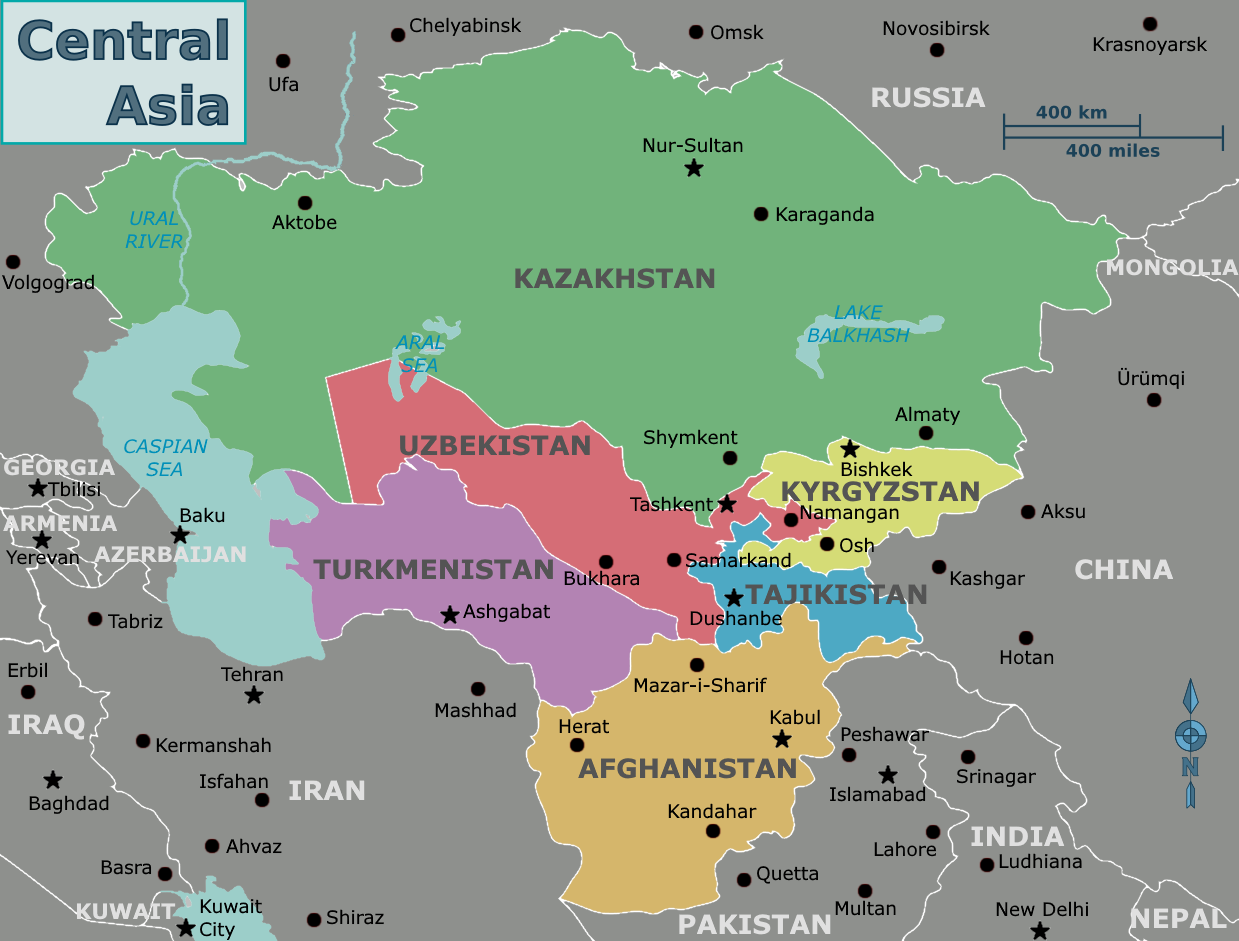
With land area of 2.6 million km^{2}, Kazakhstan is the largest country in Central Asia and the ninth largest in the world

According to CIA World Factbook estimates:

Area
- Total: 2,724,900 km^{2} (1,052,100 sq mi)
  - country rank in the world: 9th
- Land: 2,699,700 km^{2} (1,042,400 sq mi)
- Water: 25,200 km^{2} (9,700 sq mi)

Area comparative
- Australia comparative: slightly larger than Western Australia
- Canada comparative: slightly less than 1 1/2 times the size of Nunavut
- United States comparative: approximately 3/5 larger than Alaska

Land boundaries
- Total: 13,364 kilometres (8,304 mi)
- Border countries:
  - People's Republic of China (to the southeast) 1,765 kilometres (1,097 mi)
  - Kyrgyzstan (to the southeast) 1,212 kilometres (753 mi)
  - Russia (to the north) 7,644 kilometres (4,750 mi)
  - Turkmenistan (to the southwest) 413 kilometres (257 mi)
  - Uzbekistan (to the south) 2,330 kilometres (1,450 mi).
Coastline
- 0 km (0 mi)
  - Note: Kazakhstan borders the Caspian Sea. Its coastline with the Caspian Sea is 1,894 kilometres or 1,177 miles.
Maritime claims
- Border disputes with Russia, Azerbaijan, and Turkmenistan

Elevation extremes
- Lowest point: Karagiye Depression −132 metres (−433 ft)
- Highest point: Khan Tengri 6,995 metres (22,949 ft)

== Lands ==
More than three-quarters (75%) of the country, including the entire west and most of the south, is either semidesert (33.2 percent) or desert (44 percent).

- Deserts: 44% (1,198,956 km^{2})
- Semi-deserts: 14% (381,486 km^{2})
- Steppe: 26% (708,474 km^{2})
- Forests: only 5.5% (149,870 km^{2})
- Deserts + semi-deserts: 58% (1,580,442 km^{2})
- Deserts + semi-deserts + steppe: 84% (2,288,916 km^{2})

=== Land use ===
According to CIA World Factbook estimates:

Agricultural land 77.4% (2011)
- Arable land: 8.9%
- Permanent crops: 0%
- Permanent pastures: 68.5%
- Forest: 1.2%
- Other: 21.4%

Irrigated land (2012)
- 20,660 km^{2}

=== Deserts ===
1. Aral Karakum Desert 40,000 km^{2}
2. Aralkum Desert
3. Barsuki Desert
4. Betpak-Dala 75,000 km^{2}
5. Kyzylkum Desert 298,000 km^{2}
6. Moiynkum Desert 37,500 km^{2}
7. Ryn Desert 40,000 km^{2}
8. Saryesik-Atyrau Desert
9. Taukum 10,000 km^{2}
10. Ustyurt Plateau 200,000 km^{2}

== Topography and drainage ==
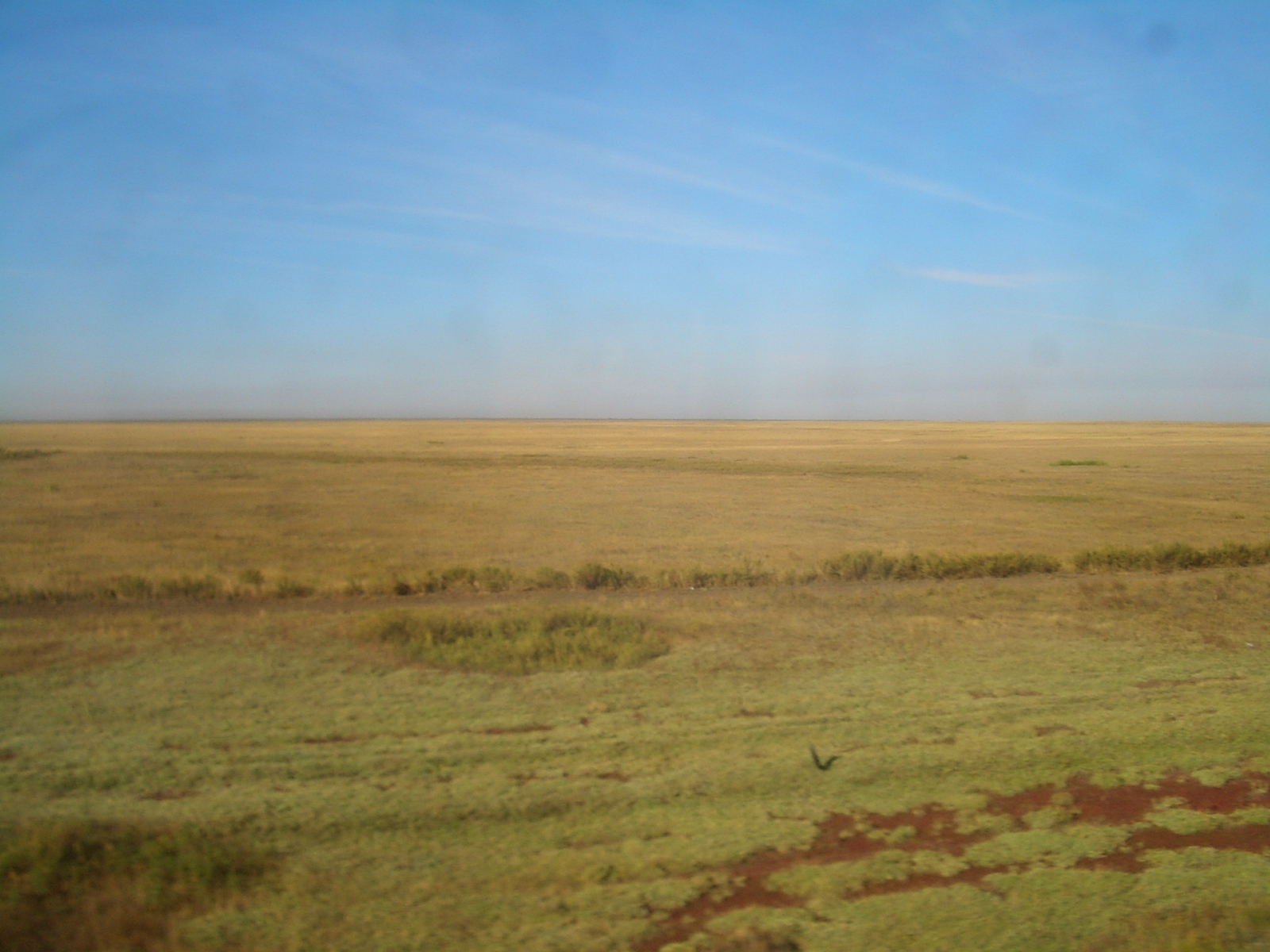
In the steppes of Central Asia (Akmola Region)

There is considerable topographical variation within Kazakhstan. The highest point is the top of the mountain Khan Tengri, on the Kyrgyz and Chinese border in the Tian Shan range, with an elevation of 6,995 m (22,949 ft) (7,010 m (23,000 ft) with ice cap) above sea level; the lowest point is the bottom of the Karagiye depression at 132 m (433 ft) below sea level, in the Mangystau province east of the Caspian Sea. Most of the country lies at between 200–300 m (660–980 ft) above sea level, but Kazakhstan's Caspian shore includes some of the lowest elevations on Earth.

Many of the peaks of the Altay and Tien Shan ranges are covered with snow, year-round, and their runoff is the source for most of Kazakhstan's freshwater rivers, streams, and lakes. Kazakhstan's Almaty region is also home to the Mynzhylky mountain plateau.

Except for the Tobol, Ishim, and Irtysh rivers (the Kazakh names for which are, respectively, Tobyl, Esil, and Ertis), portions of which flow through Kazakhstan, all of Kazakhstan's rivers and streams are part of landlocked systems. They either flow into isolated bodies of water such as the Caspian Sea or simply disappear into the steppes and deserts of central and southern Kazakhstan. Many rivers, streams, and lakes are seasonal, evaporating in summer. The three largest bodies of water are Lake Balkhash, a partially fresh, partially saline lake in the east, near Almaty, the Caspian Sea, and the Aral Sea, all of which lie partially within Kazakhstan.

Some 9.4 percent of Kazakhstan's land is mixed prairie and forest or treeless prairie, primarily in the north or in the basin of the Ural River in the west. More than three-quarters of the country, including the entire west and most of the south, is either semidesert (33.2 percent) or desert (44 percent). The terrain in these regions is bare, eroded, broken uplands (Upland and lowland), with sand dunes in the Qizilqum ("The Red Sands"; in the Russian form, Kyzylkum), Moyunqum (in the Russian form, Muyunkum) and Barsuki deserts, which occupy south-central Kazakhstan.

=== Water resources ===
Total renewable water resources
- 107.5 km^{3} (2011)

Freshwater withdrawal (domestic/industrial/agricultural)
- Total: 21.14 km^{3}/yr (4%/30%/66%)
- Per capita: 1,304 m^{3}/yr (2010)

=== Waters (rivers and lakes) ===
- Northeastern shore of the Caspian Sea
- Part of Aral Sea
- 48,000 large and small lakes such as Balkhash Lake, Lake Zaysan and Lake Alakol.
- 8,500 rivers

== Climate ==
Kazakhstan map of Köppen climate classification.

The climate of Kazakhstan consists of mostly continental, semi-arid, and cold desert climates. In summer the temperatures average more than 30 °C (86 °F) and in winter average −9 °C (15.8 °F). Kazakhstan is very vulnerable to climate change.

The climatic charts seen below are some noteworthy examples of the country's differing climates, taken from two contrasting cities (with their respective tables) representing two different parts of the country; Aktau and the Caspian Sea shore on the country's west having a distinct cold desert climate and cold semi-arid climate, while Petropavl features a climate typical to the rest of the country; an extreme variation of the humid continental climate known for its uneven rainfall distribution and drastic temperature ranges between seasons.

Despite the nation's relatively low precipitation rates and mostly arid geography, spring floods brought on by occasional heavy rainfall and snowmelt are not unusual in the northern and central regions of the country. In April 2017, following a winter with snow volumes 60 percent above average, heavy rains resulted in widespread damage and temporarily displaced thousands of people.

Aktau (Caspian Sea shore)

Climate chart (precipitation, max. and min. temperature)
| J | F | M | A | M | J | J | A | S | O | N | D |
| 8 1 −2 | 9 2 −2 | 15 6 1 | 17 14 7 | 20 22 15 | 16 26 19 | 16 29 22 | 16 28 21 | 17 23 16 | 16 16 9 | 16 9 3 | 16 3 0 |
- █ Average max. and min. temperatures in °C
- █ Precipitation totals in mm
- Source: Svali.ru
Imperial conversion
| J | F | M | A | M | J | J | A | S | O | N | D |
| 0.3 34 28 | 0.4 36 28 | 0.6 43 34 | 0.7 57 45 | 0.8 72 59 | 0.6 79 66 | 0.6 84 72 | 0.6 82 70 | 0.7 73 61 | 0.6 61 48 | 0.6 48 37 | 0.6 37 32 |
- █ Average max. and min. temperatures in °F
- █ Precipitation totals in inches

Petropavl (North Kazakhstan)

Climate chart (precipitation, max. and min. temperature)
| J | F | M | A | M | J | J | A | S | O | N | D |
| 22 −12 −20 | 17 −10 −19 | 16 −3 −13 | 22 9 −1 | 31 19 6 | 37 25 12 | 66 26 14 | 47 23 12 | 33 16 6 | 30 8 0 | 30 −4 −11 | 27 −10 −18 |
- █ Average max. and min. temperatures in °C
- █ Precipitation totals in mm
- Source: Pogoda.ru.net
Imperial conversion
| J | F | M | A | M | J | J | A | S | O | N | D |
| 0.9 11 −4 | 0.7 13 −3 | 0.6 27 10 | 0.9 48 30 | 1.2 67 43 | 1.5 76 54 | 2.6 78 57 | 1.9 73 53 | 1.3 62 42 | 1.2 47 31 | 1.2 26 12 | 1.1 15 0 |
- █ Average max. and min. temperatures in °F
- █ Precipitation totals in inches

Average daily maximum and minimum temperatures for large cities in Kazakhstan
| Location | July (°C) | July (°F) | January (°C) | January (°F) |
|---|---|---|---|---|
| Almaty | 30/18 | 86/64 | 0/−8 | 33/17 |
| Shymkent | 32/17 | 91/66 | 4/−4 | 39/23 |
| Karaganda | 27/14 | 80/57 | −8/−17 | 16/1 |
| Astana | 27/15 | 80/59 | −10/−18 | 14/−1 |
| Pavlodar | 28/15 | 82/59 | −11/−20 | 12/−5 |
| Aktobe | 30/15 | 86/61 | −8/−16 | 17/2 |

== Environmental problems ==
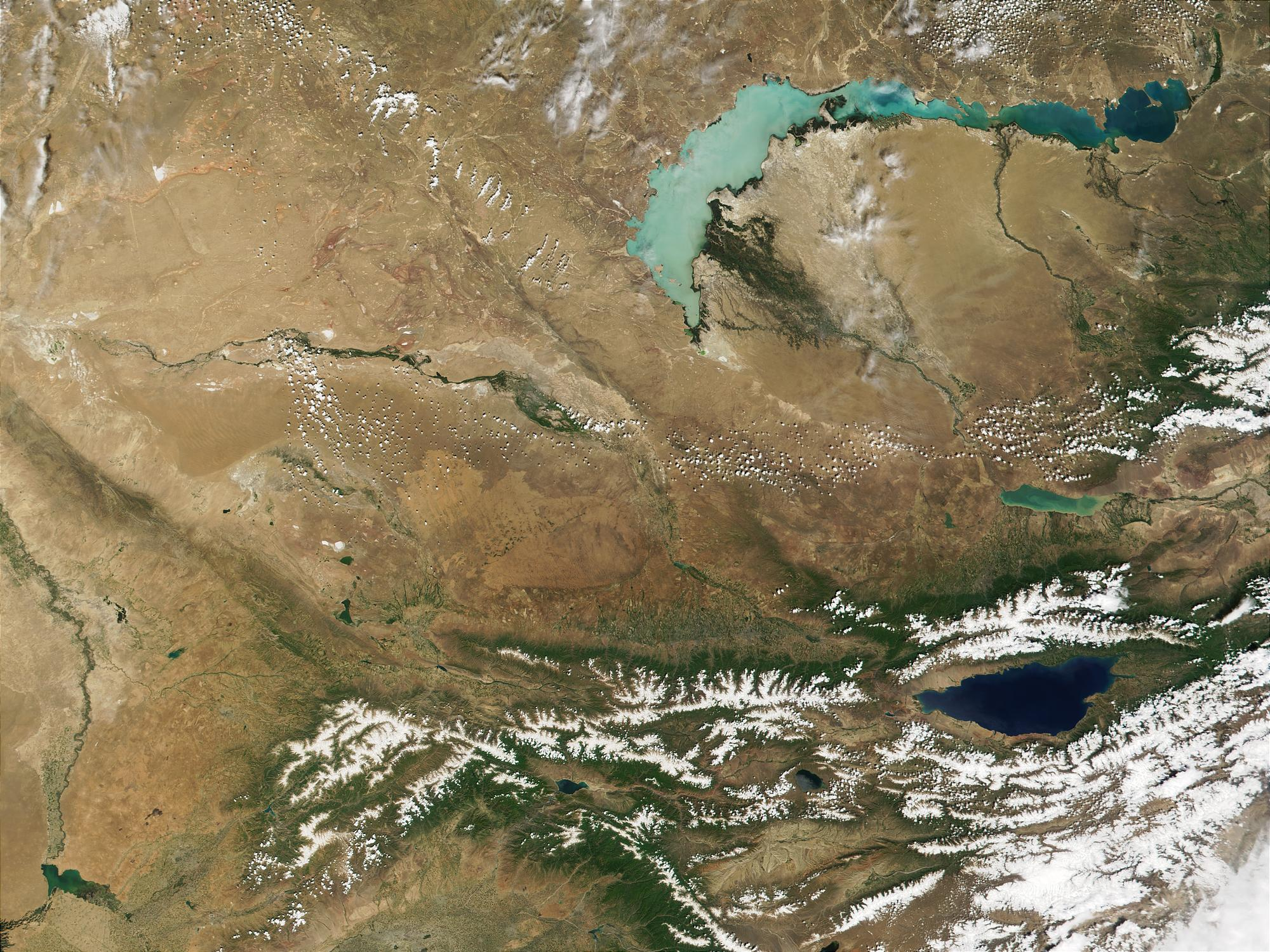
Portions of Kazakhstan (top) and Kyrgyzstan at the bottom. The lake at the top of the image is Lake Balkhash.

The environment of Kazakhstan has been badly damaged by human activity. Most of the water in Kazakhstan is polluted by industrial effluents, pesticide and fertilizer residue, and, in some places, radioactive elements. The most visible damage has been to the Aral Sea, which as recently as the 1970s was larger than any of the Great Lakes of North America save Lake Superior. The sea began to shrink rapidly when sharply increased irrigation and other demands on the only significant tributaries, the Syr Darya and the Amu Darya (the latter reaching the Aral from neighboring Uzbekistan), all but eliminated inflow. During the Soviet Era, Kazakhstan received water from Tajikistan and Kyrgyzstan, and Uzbekistan, Turkmenistan, and Kazakhstan provided oil and gas for these two nations in return. However, after the collapse of the USSR this system had collapsed and no plan to replace this system has been put in place. According to research conducted by the International Crisis Group, there is little political will to solve this problem despite Central Asia's need for mutual resource-sharing. By 1993 the Aral Sea had lost an estimated 60 percent of its volume, in the process breaking into three unconnected segments. Increasing salinity and reduced habitat have killed the Aral Sea's fish, hence destroying its once-active fishing industry, and the receding shoreline has left the former port of Aral'sk more than seventy kilometers from the water's edge. The depletion of this large body of water has increased temperature variations in the region, which in turn have affected agriculture. A much greater agricultural impact, however, has come from the salt- and pesticide-laden soil that the wind is known to carry as far away as the Himalaya Mountains and the Pacific Ocean. Deposition of this heavily saline soil on nearby fields effectively sterilizes them. Evidence suggests that salts, pesticides, and residues of chemical fertilizers are also adversely affecting human life around the former Aral Sea; infant mortality in the region approaches 10 percent compared with the national rate of 2.7 percent in 1991.

By contrast, the water level of the Caspian Sea has been rising steadily since 1978 for reasons that scientists have not been able to explain fully. At the northern end of the sea, more than 10,000 square kilometres of land in Atyrau Province have been flooded. Experts estimate that if current rates of increase persist, the coastal city of Atyrau, eighty-eight other population centers, and many of Kazakhstan's Caspian oil fields could be submerged soon.

Wind erosion has also affected the northern and central parts of the republic because of the introduction of wide-scale dryland wheat farming. During the 1950s and 1960s, much soil was lost when vast tracts of Kazakhstan's prairies were plowed under as part of Khrushchev's Virgin Lands agricultural project. By the mid-1990s, an estimated 60 percent of the republic's pastureland was in various stages of desertification.

Industrial pollution is a bigger concern in Kazakhstan's manufacturing cities, where aging factories pump huge quantities of unfiltered pollutants into the air and groundwater. The former capital, Almaty, is particularly threatened, in part because of the postindependence boom in private automobile ownership.

The gravest environmental threat to Kazakhstan comes from radiation, especially in the Semey (Semipalatinsk) region of the northeast, where the Soviet Union tested almost 500 nuclear weapons, 116 of them above ground. Often, such tests were conducted without evacuating or even alerting the local population. Although nuclear testing was halted in 1990, radiation poisoning, birth defects, severe anemia, and leukemia are thought to be very common in the area.

With some conspicuous exceptions, lip service has been the primary official response to Kazakhstan's ecological problems. In February 1989, opposition to Soviet nuclear testing and its ill effects in Kazakhstan led to the creation of one of the republic's largest and most influential grass-roots movements, Nevada-Semipalatinsk, which was founded by Kazak poet and public figure Olzhas Suleymenov. In the first week of the movement's existence, Nevada-Semipalatinsk gathered more than two million signatures from Kazakhstanis of all ethnic groups on a petition to Mikhail Gorbachev demanding the end of nuclear testing in Kazakhstan. After a year of demonstrations and protests, the test ban took effect in 1990. It remained in force in 1996, although in 1995 at least one unexploded device reportedly was still in position near Semey.

Once its major ecological objective was achieved, Nevada-Semipalatinsk made various attempts to broaden into a more general political movement; it has not pursued a broad ecological or "green" agenda. A very small green party, Tabigat, made common cause with the political opposition in the parliament of 1994.

The government has established a Ministry of Ecology and Bioresources, with a separate administration for radioecology, but the ministry's programs are underfunded and given low priority. In 1994 only 23 percent of budgeted funds were actually allotted to environmental programs. Many official meetings and conferences are held (more than 300 have been devoted to the problem of the Aral Sea alone), but few practical programs have gone into operation. In 1994 the World Bank, the International Monetary Fund (IMF), and the United States Environmental Protection Agency agreed to give Kazakhstan $62 million to help the country overcome ecological problems.

Natural hazards
Earthquakes in the south, and mud slides around Almaty
Environment—current issues
Radioactive or toxic chemical sites associated with its former defense industries and test ranges are found throughout the country and pose health risks for human beings and animals; industrial pollution is severe in some cities; because the two main rivers which flowed into the Aral Sea have been diverted for irrigation, it is drying up and leaving behind a harmful layer of chemical pesticides and natural salts; these substances are then picked up by the wind and blown into noxious dust storms; pollution in the Caspian Sea; soil pollution from overuse of agricultural chemicals and salination from poor infrastructure and wasteful irrigation practices
Environment—international agreements
- Party to: Biodiversity, Climate Change, Desertification, Endangered Species, Ozone Layer Protection, Ship Pollution (MARPOL 73/78)
- Signed, but not ratified: Climate Change-Kyoto Protocol
