= Moiynkum District =

Coordinates: 45°09′36″N 72°33′00″E

Moiynkum Мойынқұм
- District
- Мойынқұм ауданы
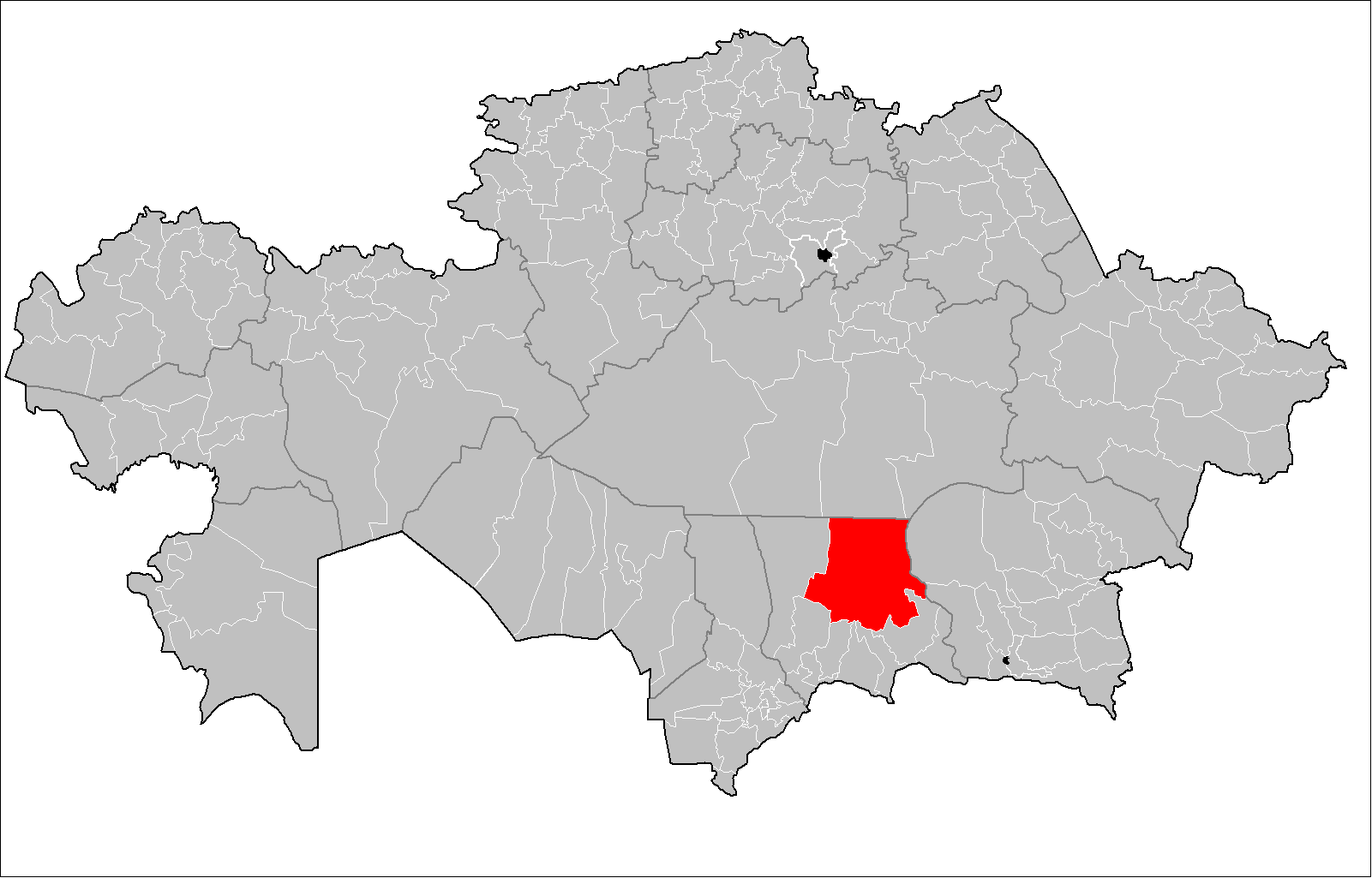
- Location of Moiynkum District in Kazakhstan
- Country: Kazakhstan
- Region: Jambyl Region
- Administrative center: Moiynkum

Government
  - Akim: Ermek Karentaev

Population (2013)
  - Total: 32,304
- Time zone: UTC+6 (East)

Moiynkum (Kazakh: Мойынқұм ауданы, Moiynqūm audany) is a district of Jambyl Region in south-eastern Kazakhstan. The administrative center of the district is the auyl of Moiynkum.

== Geography ==
The district is named after the Moiynkum Desert and lies at the northeastern edge of the desert.

Parts of it are in the lower basin of the Chu river, as well as by Lake Balkhash. Lakes Kashkanteniz and Karakol are located in the district.
