= Alatyube oil field =

Oil field in Mangystau Region, Kazakhstan

Coordinates: 43.7003959°N 51.8558121°E

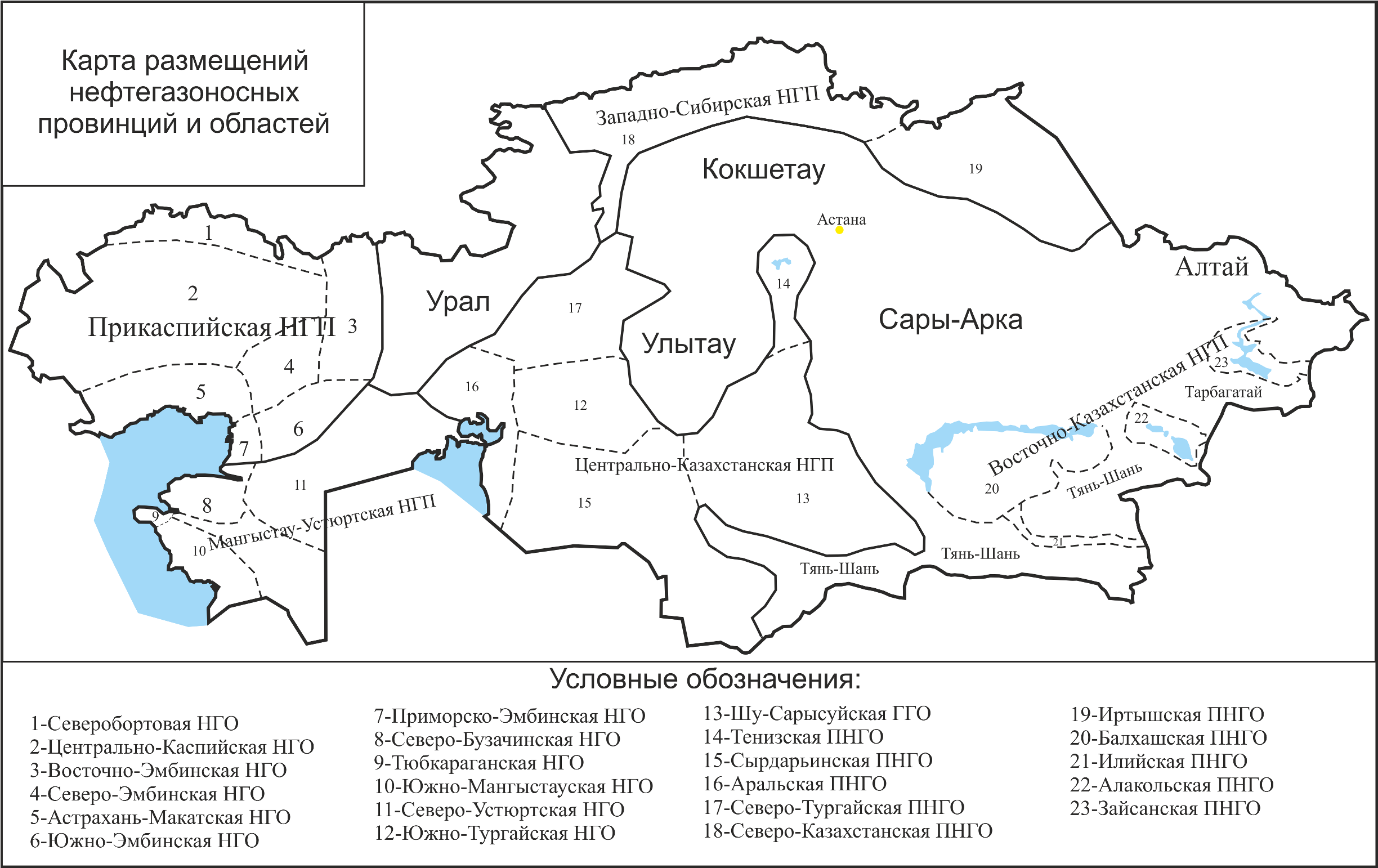
Oil in Kazakhstan; South Mangyshlak is '10'

The Alatyube oil field (also Alatobe oil field; Kazakh: Алатөбе мұнай кен орны, Russian: Алатобинское месторождение) is an oil field in Mangystau Region, Kazakhstan, on the Mangyshlak Peninsula, 33 km northeast of Aktau. It was discovered in 1977, explored in 1980–1982, and being developed since 1987. The oil is at the depth of about 3,900m in Middle Triassic carbonatite layers, of thickness about 60 m.

Until 2028 it is being developed by the company Mangystaumunaygaz.

There is also the East Alatyube oil field. a.k.a. Alatyube (East block) nearby, discovered in 1990 by test drilling in the structure seismically detected in 1982 and explored in 1984–1986.
