= Kultuk =

Kultuk (Russian: Култук) may refer to:

- Kultuk, Slyudyansky District, Irkutsk Oblast, an urban locality in Irkutsk Oblast
- Kultuk, Usolsky District, Irkutsk Oblast, a rural locality in Irkutsk Oblast
- Dead Kultuk, a bay in the Caspian Sea
- Nord-Ost-Kultuk, a village in Azerbaijan
- ru:Култук (ветер), a southwestern wind in the Lake Baikal area
