= Kaydak Inlet =

Kaydak Inlet Залив Кайдак Sor Kaydak
- Inlet
- Location within Caspian Sea
- Coordinates: 44°41′N 53°25′E
- Country: Kazakhstan
- Region: Mangystau Region
- Sea: Caspian Sea

The Kaydak Inlet or Sor Kaydak (Russian: Залив Кайдак) is a narrow inlet or arm at the eastern end of the Dead Kultuk (former Komsomolets), a bay of the Caspian Sea in the coast of Kazakhstan. Located at the mainland end of the bay, it forms the eastern limit of the Buzachi Peninsula, at the north of the Mangyshlak Peninsula. The inlet was shallow and cut deep into the coast extending east and then roughly southwards in a SSW direction. Like all shallow gulfs of the eastern shores of the Caspian, it had a high salinity.

In the same manner as the Dead Kultuk, the Kaydak Inlet had a distinct coastline in former times, but in the 1990s and 2000s, with higher Caspian Sea levels, the water penetrated inland through the neck of the bay producing waterlogged marshes. At times of higher water level both the bay and the inlet were filled with Caspian Sea water. The water in the shallow inlet had striking colours, in which delicate tones of blue or of brown predominated according to the seasons.

With shrinking Caspian Sea level in the 2020s as a result of global warming and increased evaporation, the Kaydak Inlet became dry.

== Cartography ==
The area was mapped by Fedor Ivanovich Soimonov during the Caspian Expedition, which surveyed the Caspian Sea from 1719 to 1727, but was only accurately described later by G. S. Karelin in 1832.

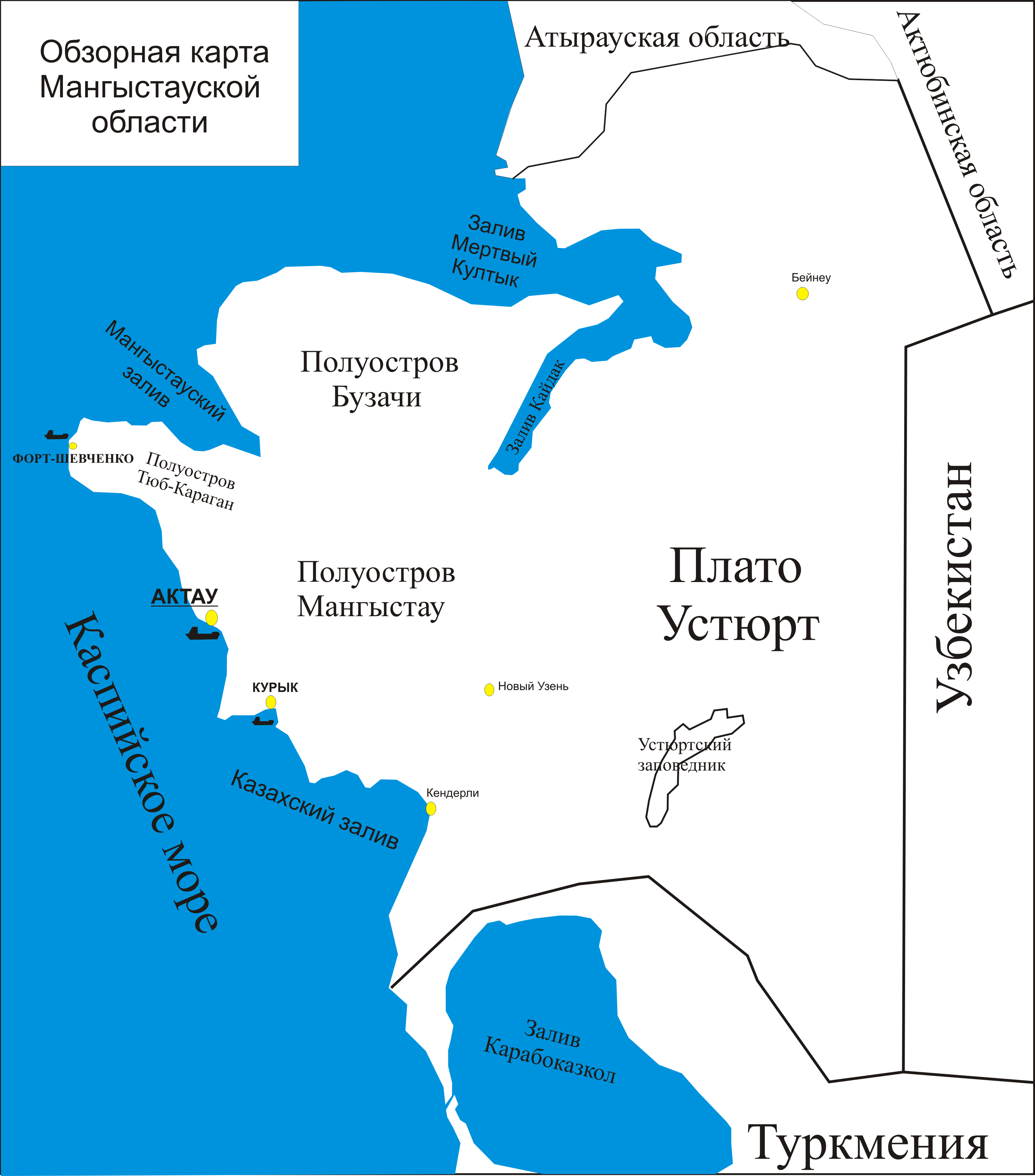
Map of the Mangyshlak Peninsula area showing the Kaydak Inlet.

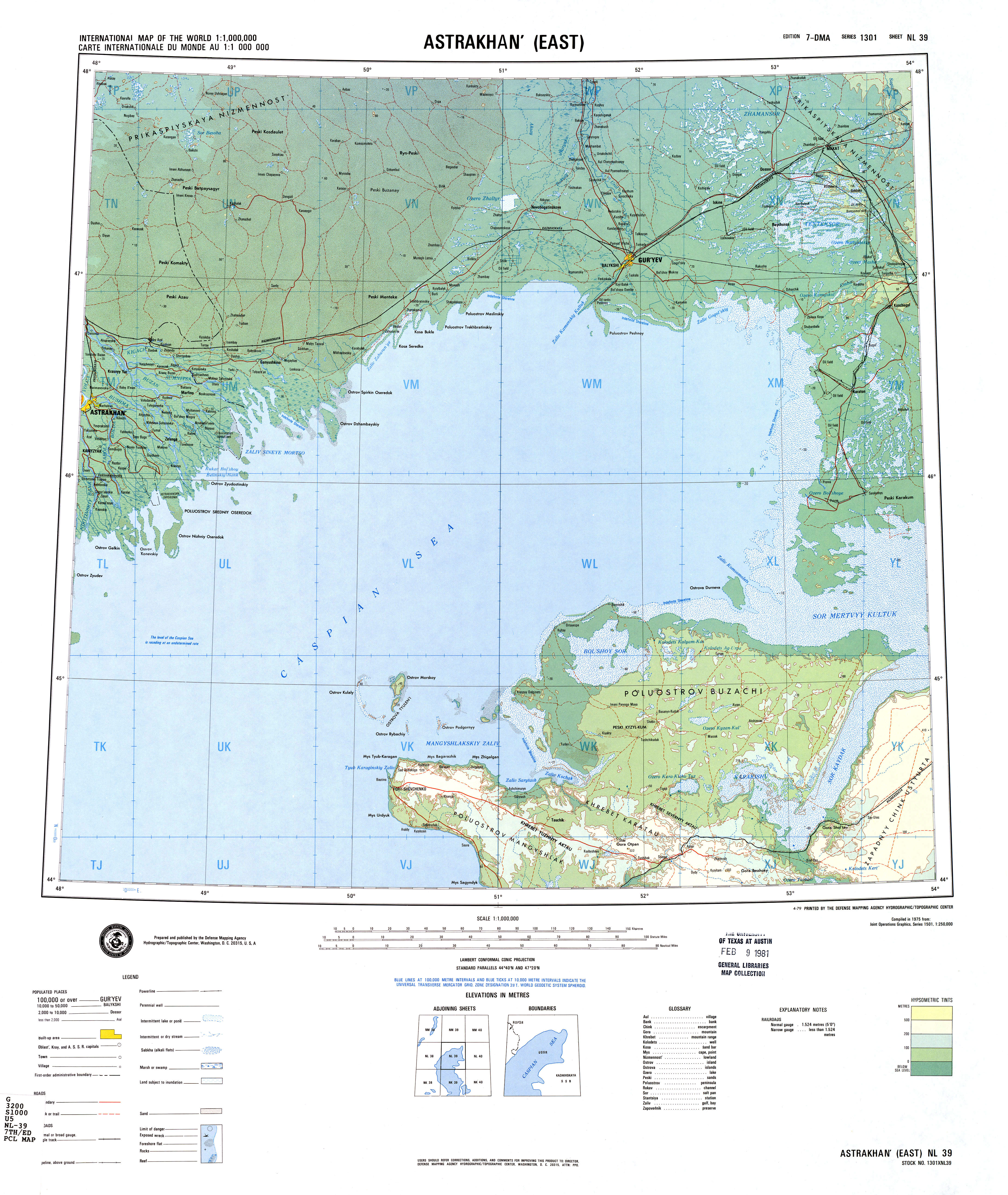
Map of the northeastern part of Caspian Sea with the Kaydak Inlet in the lower right.

== See also ==
- Dead Kultuk
- Sor (geomorphology)
