= Buzachi Peninsula =

Buzachi Peninsula Бозащы түбегі Полуостров Бузачи
- Peninsula
- Location within Caspian Sea
- Coordinates: 44°50′N 52°24′E
- Country: Kazakhstan
- Region: Mangystau Region

The Buzachi Peninsula (Kazakh: Бозащы түбегі, Bozaşy tübegı; Russian: Полуостров Бузачи) is a peninsula located in western Kazakhstan. It borders on the Mangyshlak Bay of the Caspian Sea in the west and with the Mangyshlak Peninsula in the southwest. The Dead Kultuk lies to the northeast and the narrow Kaydak Inlet forms its eastern limit. Durneva Island lies to the north and the Tyuleniy Archipelago lies off the western shores of the peninsula.

Administratively the Buzachi Peninsula is part of Kazakhstan's Mangystau Province. Currently it is a new oil exploration area.

This peninsula is a vast low-lying depression with salt marshes and salt lakes. Parts of it lie between 20 and 30 m below sea level, lower than the Caspian. The area provides an important habitat for thousands of Goitered Gazelles.

== Cartography ==
The area was mapped by Fedor Ivanovich Soimonov during the Caspian Expedition, which surveyed the Caspian Sea from 1719 to 1727.

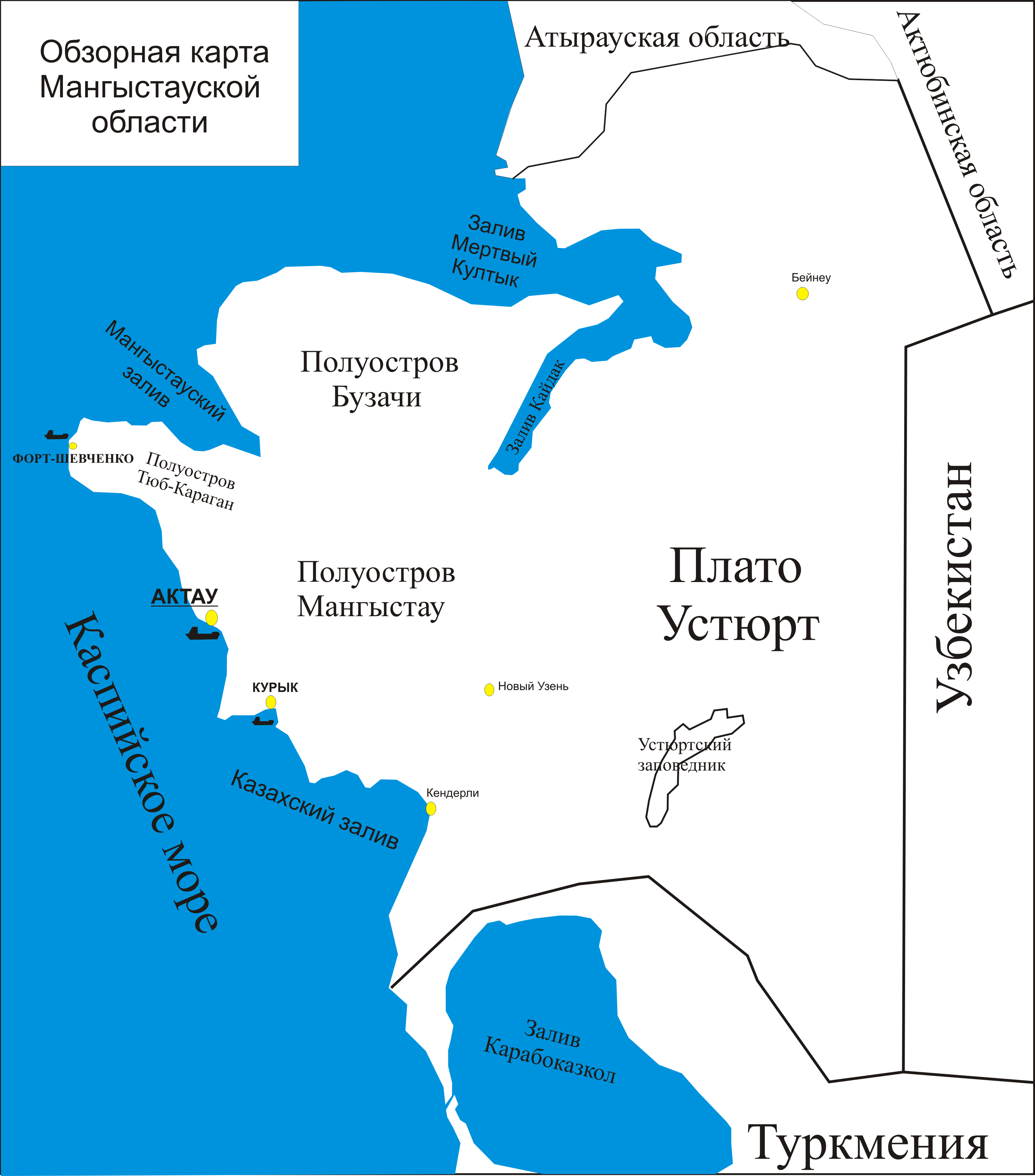
Map of the area with the Buzachi Peninsula at the top.

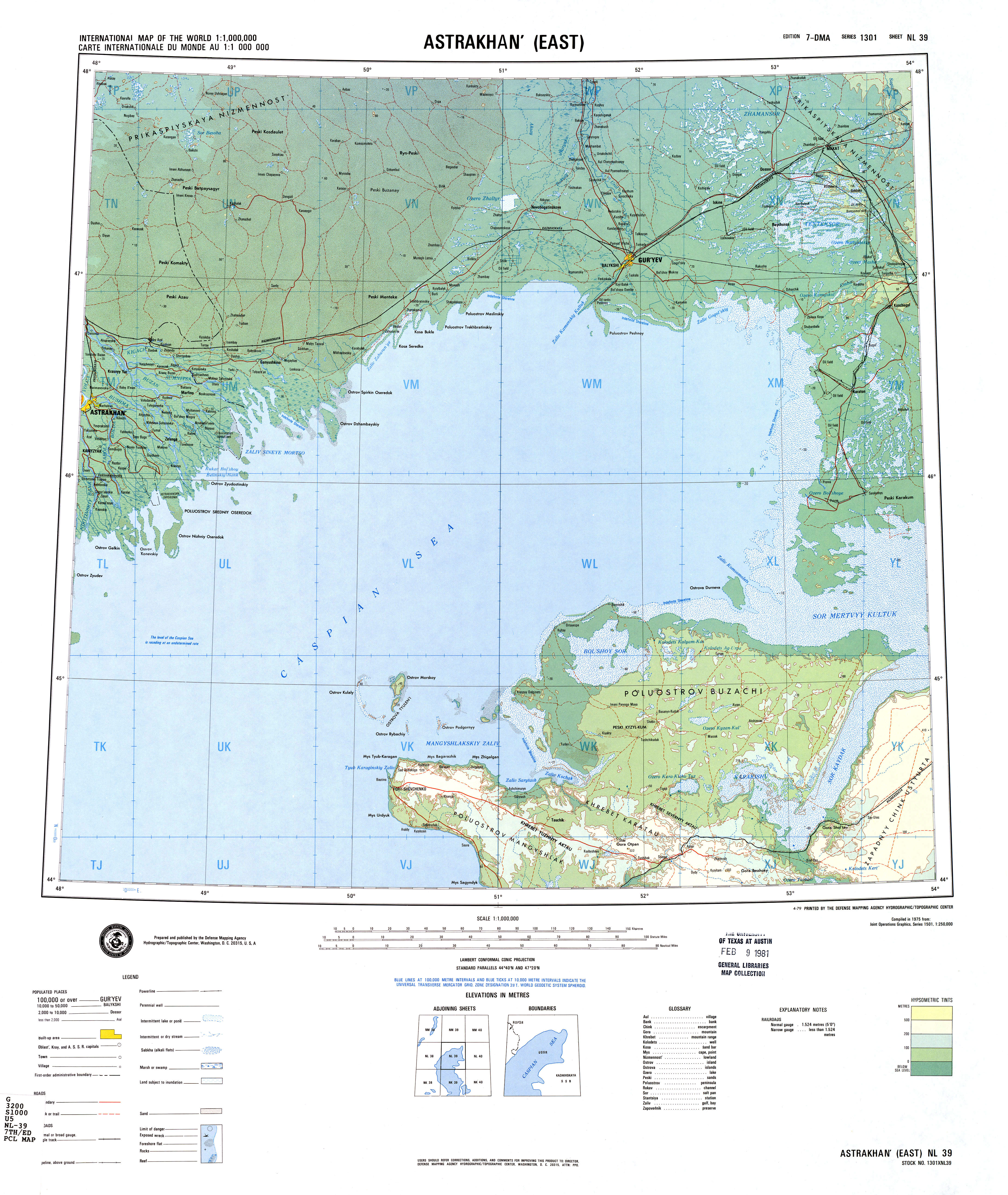
Map of the northeastern part of Caspian Sea with the Buzachi Peninsula in the lower right.

== See also ==
- Oil megaprojects (2003)
