= Durneva Island =

Durneva Дурнева Dūrnev Araldary
- Island
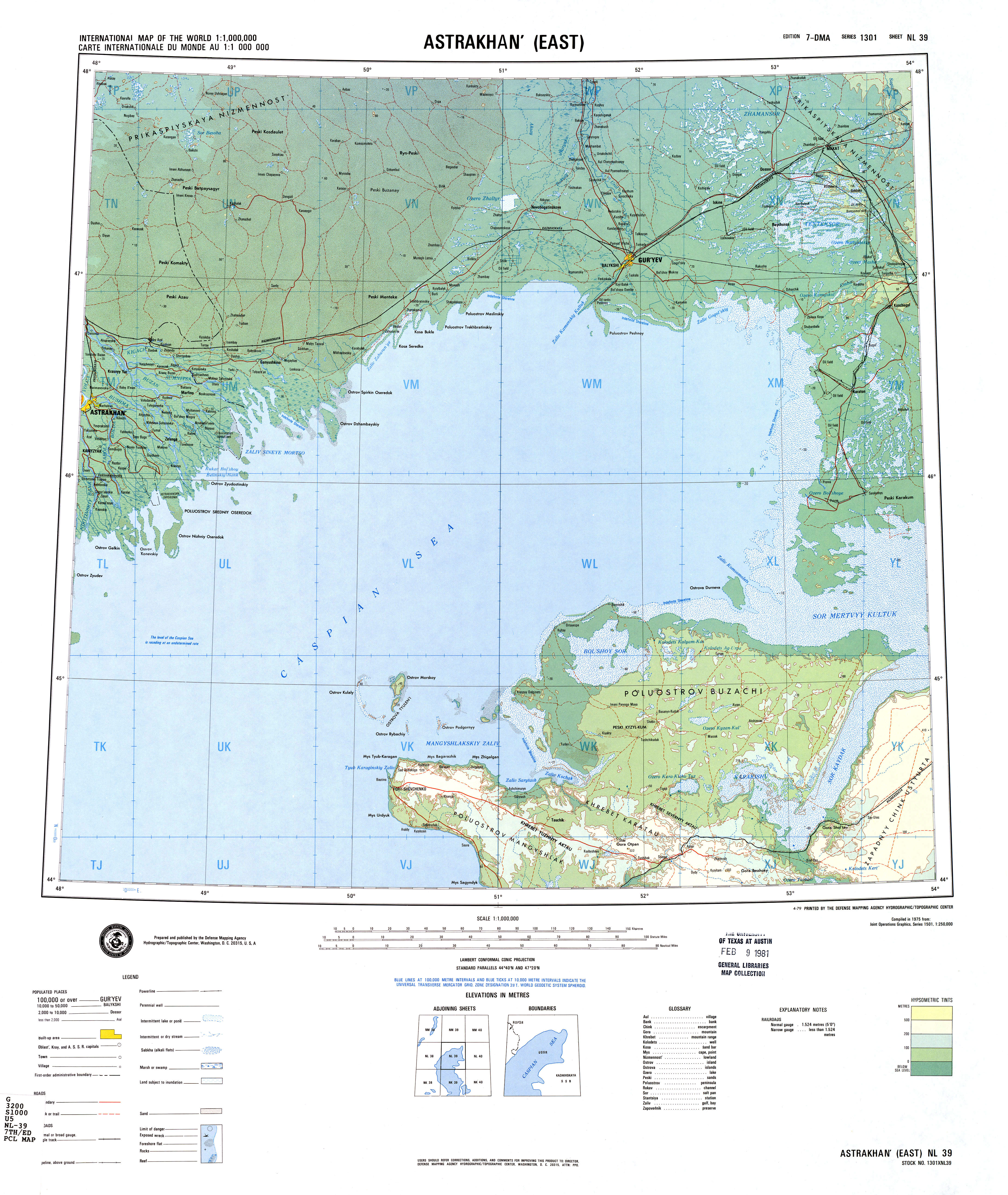
- North-East part of the Caspian Sea

- Location within Caspian Sea
- Coordinates: 45°28′N 52°45′E
- Country: Kazakhstan
- Region: Mangystau Region

Durneva Island or Dūrnev Araldary (Russian: Остров Дурнева) is a coastal island near the entrance of the Dead Kultuk (former Komsomolets Bay) of the eastern Caspian Sea. It is located north of the Buzachi Peninsula and 41.6 km north of Turum.

Administratively, Durneva Island belongs to the Mangystau Region of Kazakhstan.

== Cartography ==
Durneva is probably the island which appears in early maps of the Caspian Sea as Ile des Cygnes (Swan Island). The island was first accurately mapped only by Fedor Ivanovich Soimonov during the 1719 Caspian Expedition, which surveyed the Caspian Sea from 1719 to 1727.

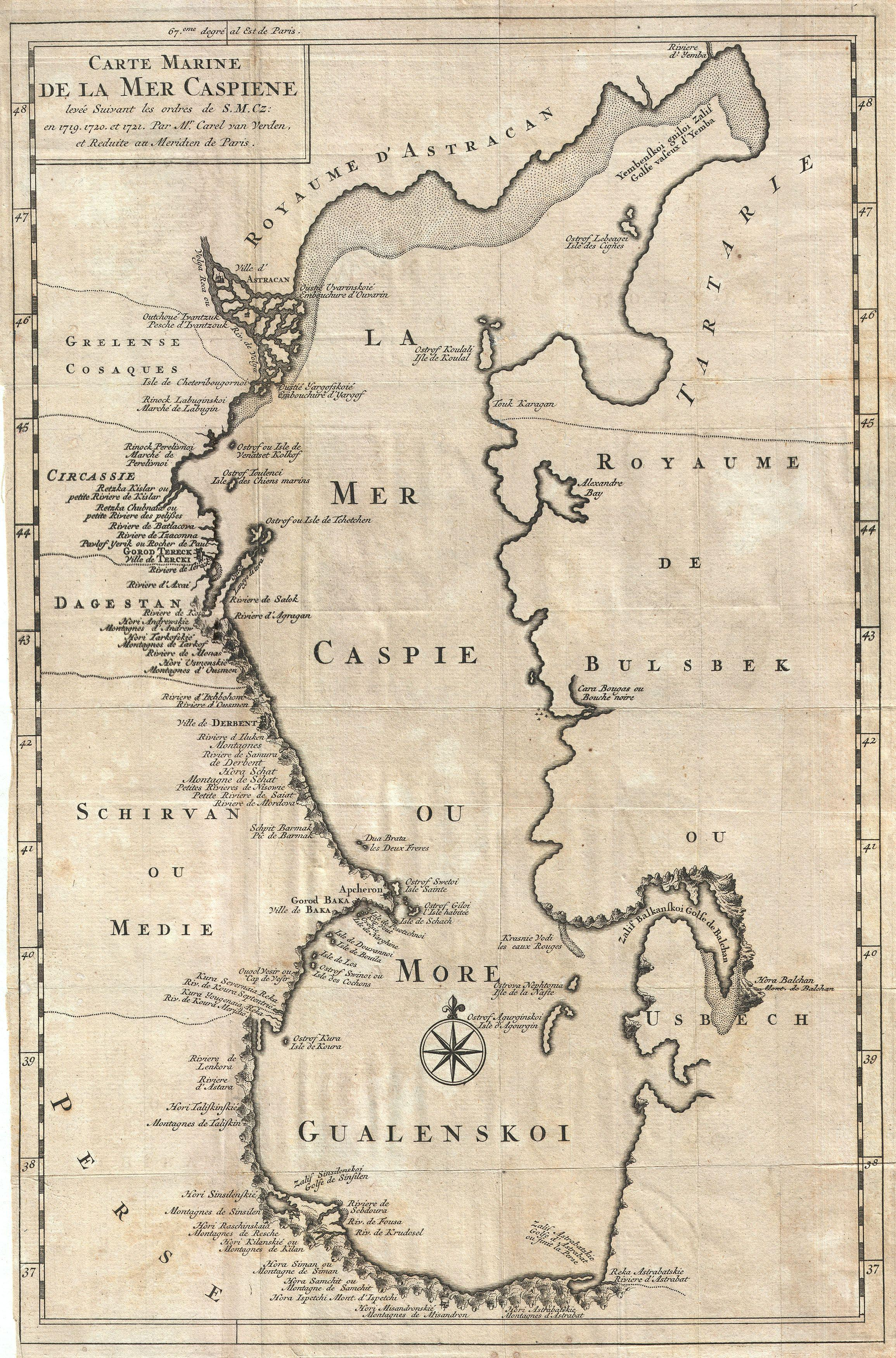
1721 Van Verden map of the Caspian Sea with Ostrof Lebeagei or Ile des Cygnes (Swan Island).
