= Siberia Governorate =

1708–1782 unit of Russia

Coordinates: 58°11′N 68°16′E

Siberia Governorate Сибирская губерния (Russian)
- Governorate of Russian Empire
- 1708–1782
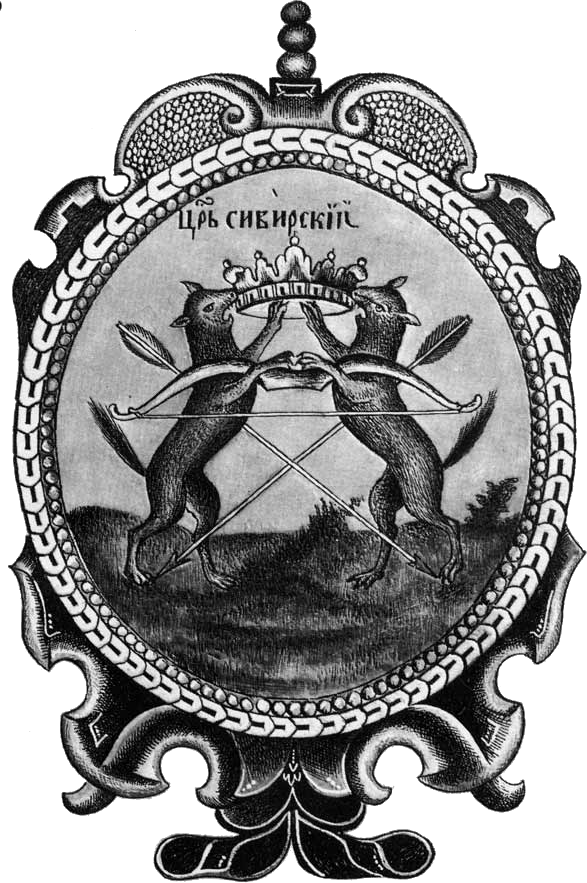
- Coat of arms

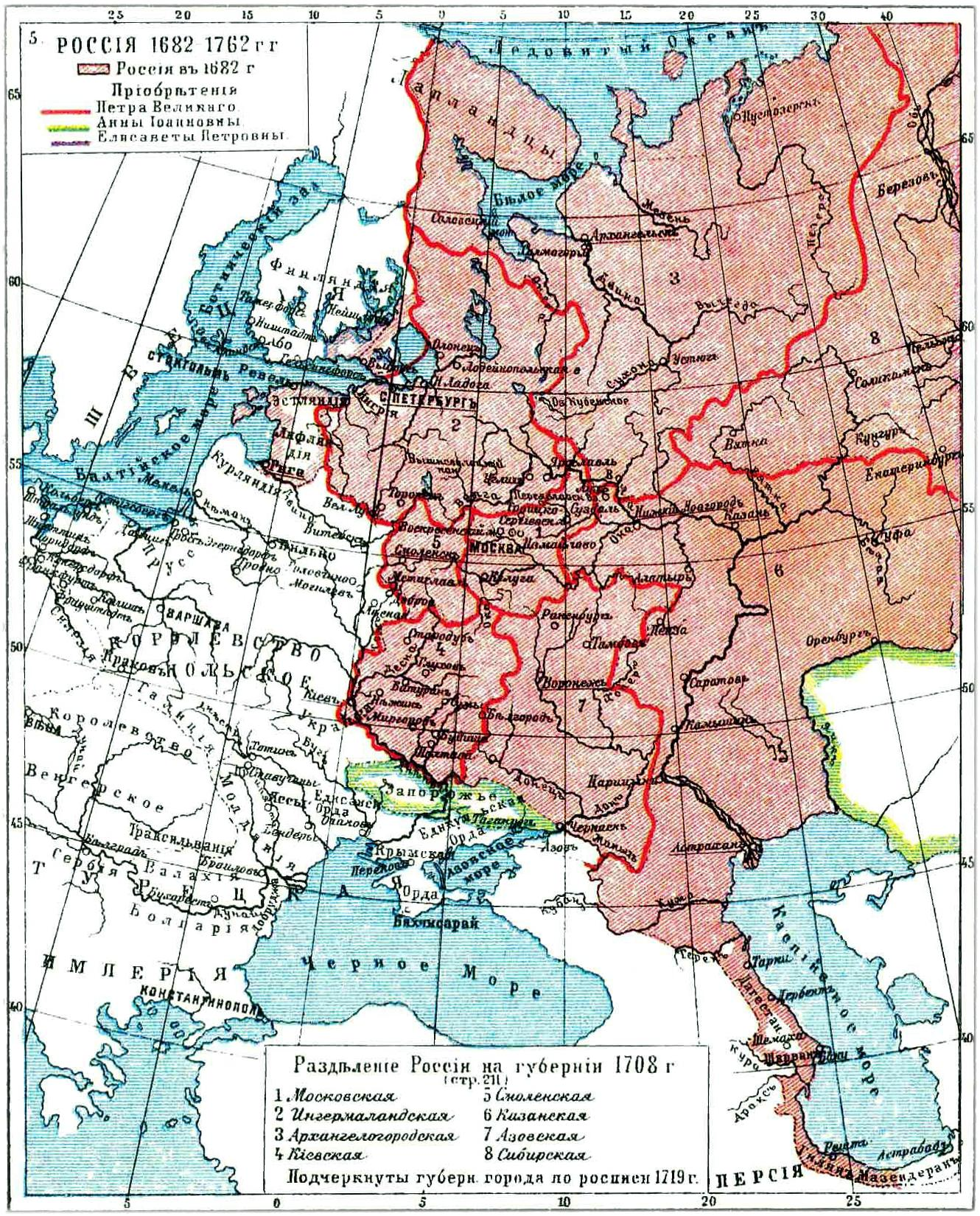
- Governorate subdivision of Russian Empire in 1682-1762. Siberia Governorate is shown as number 8.

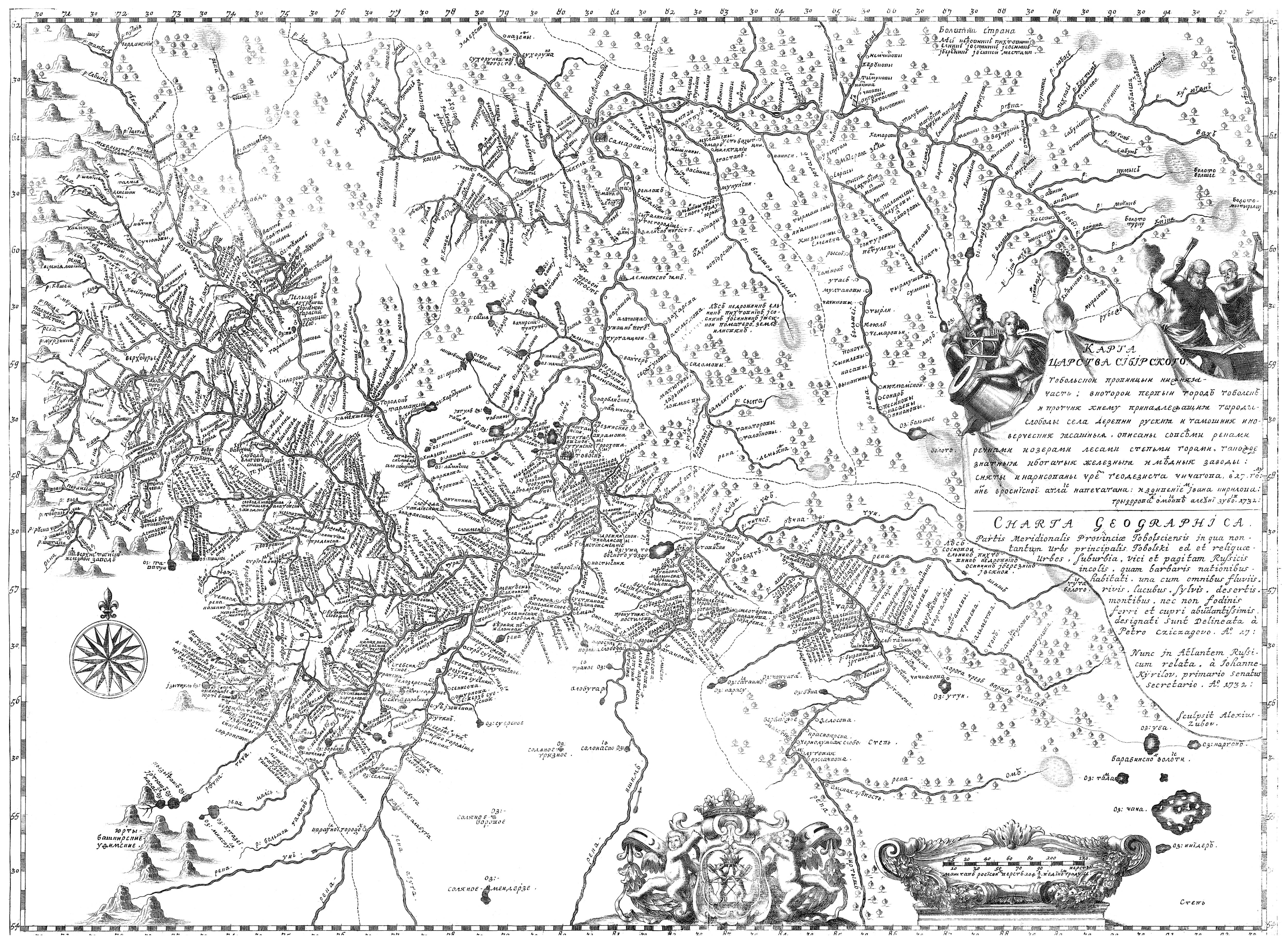
- Capital: Tobolsk
- History
  - Established: 29 December [O.S. 18 December] 1708
  - Disestablished: 30 January [O.S. 19 January] 1782
- Political subdivisions: three provinces
Succeeded by
| Tobolsk Viceroyalty |
| Kolyvan Viceroyalty |
| Irkutsk Governorate |

Coat of arms of Tsardom of Siberia (part of the Russian Imperial Coat of Arms)

Siberia Governorate (Russian: Сибирская губерния, romanized: Sibirskaya guberniya) was an administrative-territorial unit (guberniya) of the Tsardom of Russia and the Russian Empire, which existed from 1708 until 1782. Its seat was in Tobolsk (initially spelt as Tobolesk). The governorate was located in the east of Russian Empire and bordered China in the south, Kazan Governorate in the southwest, and Archangelgorod Governorate in the northwest. In the north and the east, the governorate was limited by the seas of the Arctic and Pacific Oceans. In terms of area, Siberia Governorate was by far the biggest of all the governorates, as it included areas in the Urals, Siberia, and the Russian Far East some of which were not yet even settled by Russians at the time.

== Establishment ==
Siberia Governorate, together with seven other governorates, was established on 29 December [O.S. 18 December] 1708, by Tsar Peter the Great's edict. As with the rest of the governorates, neither the borders nor internal subdivisions of Siberia Governorate were defined; instead, the territory was defined as a set of cities and the lands adjacent to those cities.

At the time of establishment, the following thirty cities were included in Siberia Governorate:

- Listed as towns:

1. Beryozov
2. Ilimskoy
3. Irkutskoy
4. Ketskoy
5. Krasny Yar
6. Kuznetskoy
7. Mangazeya
8. Narym
9. Nerchinskoy
10. Pelym
11. Surgut
12. Tara
13. Tobolesk
14. Tomskoy
15. Turinsk
16. Tyumen
17. Verkhoturye
18. Yakutskoy
19. Yeniseysk

- Listed as Pomor towns:

1. Cherdyn
2. Kay Gorodok
3. Kungur
4. Perm Velikaya
5. Sol Kamskaya
6. Vyatka with four unnamed suburbs
7. Yarensk

== Transformations and disestablishment ==
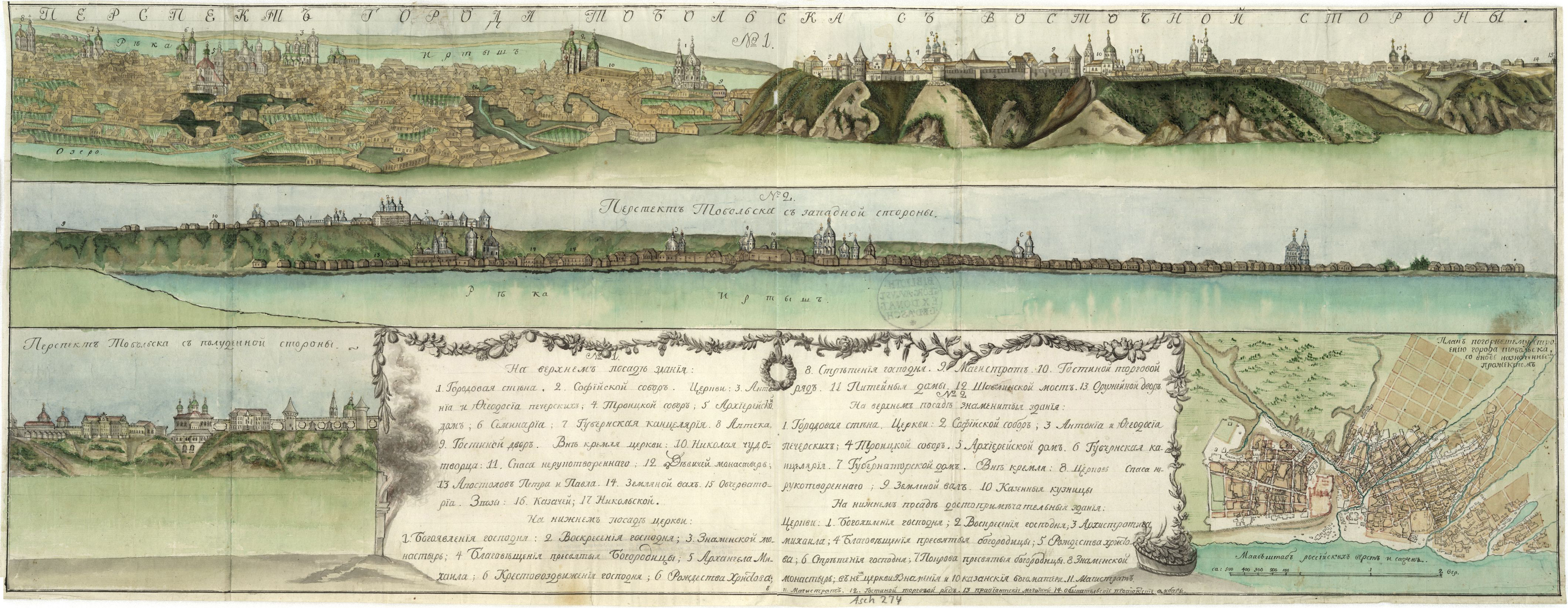
Tobolsk in 1750

In 1719, the governorate was divided into three provinces: Vyatka, Solikamsk, and Tobolsk. Simultaneously, Yarensky Uyezd with the administrative centre of Yarensk was moved from Siberia Governorate to Archangelgorod Governorate.

In 1724, Tobolsk Province was split into Yeniseysk, Irkutsk, and Tobolsk Provinces. In 1727, Vyatka and Solikamsk Provinces were transferred to Kazan Governorate.

In 1736, Okhotsky Uyezd was split off from Yakutsky Uyezd. In the same year, Siberia Governorate was split into two independent areas: Siberia Province, which consisted of the former Tobolsk and Yeniseysk Provinces, under the authority of the governor (posted in Tobolsk), and Irkutsk Province. In 1737, the areas in the South Urals were organised into Iset Province with the centre in the town of Shadrinsk, and the province was transferred into Orenburg Governorate. In 1764, Irkutsk Governorate was established in place of the former Irkutsk Province.

In 1782, Siberia Governorate was abolished, and its area split into Tobolsk Viceroyalty and Kolyvan Viceroyalty. Irkutsk Governorate was transformed into Irkutsk Viceroyalty.

== Governors ==
The administration of the governorate was performed by a governor. The governors of Siberia Governorate were:

- 1708–1714 Matvey Petrovich Gagarin
- 1714–1716 Ivan Bibikov (acting governor)
- 1716–1719 Matvey Petrovich Gagarin, imprisoned in 1719 and executed by hanging in 1721 for corruption;
- 1719–1724 Alexey Mikhaylovich Cherkassky
- 1724–1726 Mikhail Vladimirovich Dolgorukov
- 1726–1727 Alexey Mikhaylovich Surov (acting governor)
- 1727–1728 Mikhail Vladimirovich Dolgorukov
- 1728–1731 Ivan Vasilyevich Boltin (vice-governor, acting governor)
- 1730 Vasily Lukich Dolgorukov (never arrived to Tobolsk, imprisoned and subsequently executed in 1739)
- 1731–1736 Alexey Lvovich Pleshcheyev
- 1736–1741 Pyotr Ivanovich Buturlin
- 1741–1742 Ivan Afanasyevich Shipov
- 1742–1752 Alexey Mikhaylovich Sukharev
- 1754–1757 Vasily Alexeyevich Myatlev
- 1757–1763 Fyodor Ivanovich Soimonov
- 1763–1780 Denis Ivanovich Chicherin
