= Inland salt marsh =

Saltwater marsh located away from the coast

An inland salt marsh is a saltwater marsh located away from the coast. It is formed and maintained in areas when evapotranspiration exceeds precipitation and/or when sodium- and chloride-laden groundwater is released from natural brine aquifers. Its vegetation is dominated by halophytic plant communities.

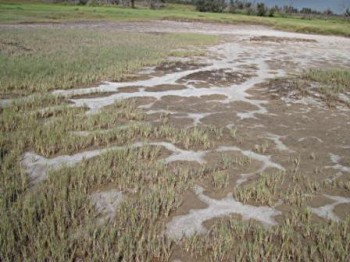
Salt flats in an inland salt marsh in Quivira National Wildlife Refuge in Kansas.

== Overview ==
Inland salt marshes (ISMs) are rare, non-tidal wetlands which form either due to the influence of saline groundwater and proximate springs and seeps or from evapotranspiration exceeding precipitation. Primarily located in the Great Lakes region of the US, they are dominantly composed of salt-tolerant, halophytic plant communities including the invasive Phragmites australis (common reed). Anthropogenic impacts on brine springs have decreased their already low global coverage and have led to their classification as G1 critically imperiled ecosystems. Of note, inland salt marshes are globally occurring, though this article primarily discusses ISMs from the US and Europe.

== Flora and fauna ==
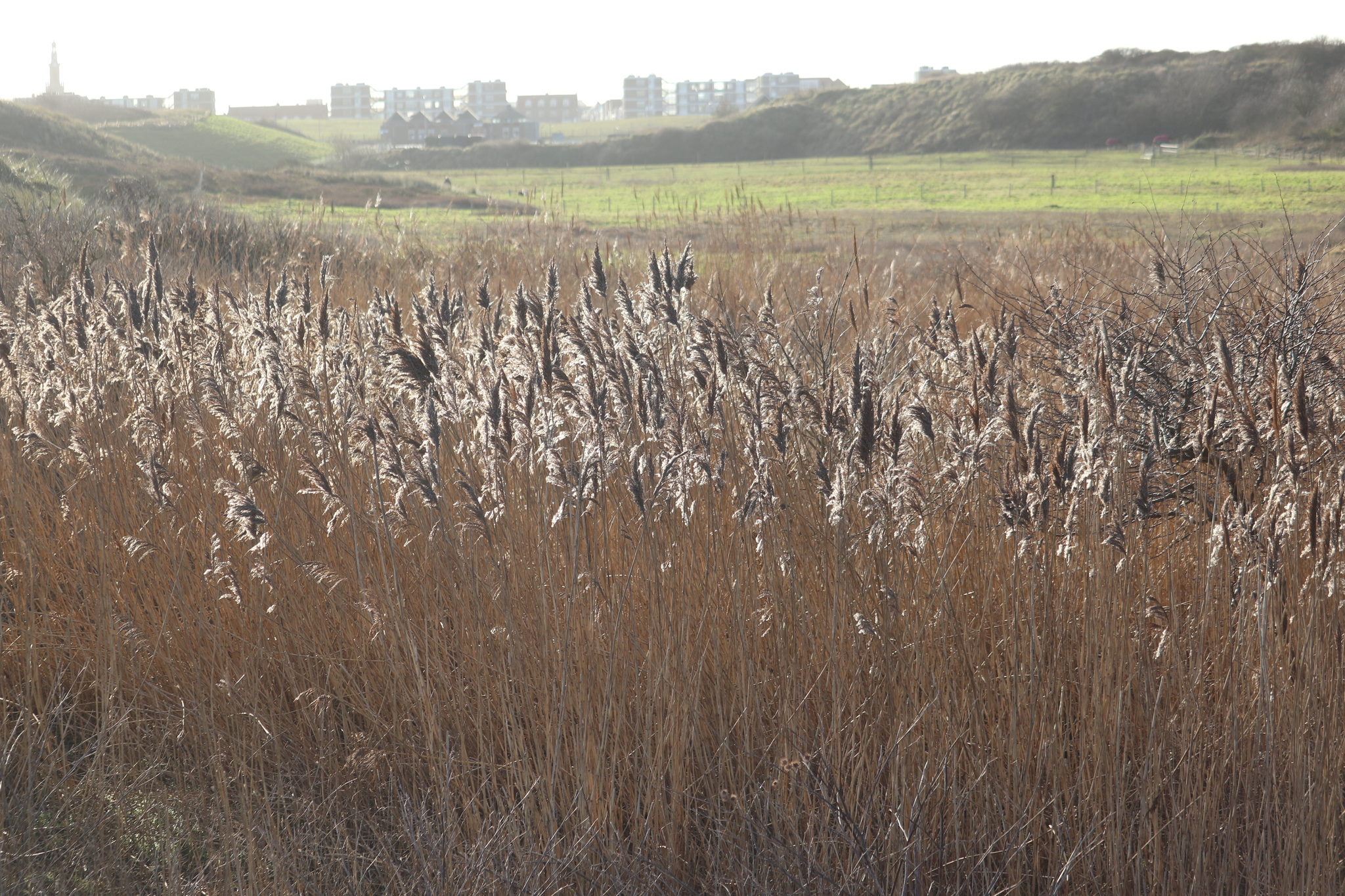
Phragmites australis (common reed) in a salt marsh community. P. australis is a non-native species in US ISMs.

If vegetation is at all present, ISMs are typically dominated by halophytic vegetative communities, though species-specific composition may vary among marshes. In a study quantifying spatial variability of ISM vegetation, New York ISMs were found to be composed of Phalaris arundinacea (reed canary grass), Typha × glauca, Lythrum salicaria (purple loostrife), and invasive Phragmites australis (common reed). Rapidly invading US ISMs, Phragmites australis has been shown to associate with highly saline areas with short hydroperiods, suggesting high water levels dilute salinity and decrease photosynthetic activity of this halophytic species. Michigan ISMs were found to be mainly composed of E. parvula and S. americanus, with little commonality with New York ISMs.

Vegetation of inland salt marshes have also been shown to reflect environmental conditions. A recently accepted European study provides detailed analyses on species associations with salinity, moisture, light availability, and nitrogen content. Analyses suggest that certain ISM species have specific environmental requirements, and knowledge of which can better inform salt marsh conservation efforts accordingly.

== Soil chemistry ==
Inland salt marshes can have extremely dynamic and harsh soil chemistry conditions. Much of the marsh is saturated with a layer of sodium chloride, failing to sustain much plant life that can not tolerate such high salinity environments. For halophytic plants which can colonize this harsh soil, nitrogen content is also a limiting factor. This limitation is increased when plants are inundated with water, as higher levels can dilute the soil and reduce availability of nitrate and ammonium sources of nitrogen.

Many studies have also investigated the role of soil chemistry in the productivity and community structures of ISMs. For instance, a study on an Ohio salt marsh found Salicornia europea (common glasswort) increased production when fertilized with nitrogen, and its different growth forms may be induced by varying soil nitrogen concentrations. Conversely, Hordeum jubatum (foxtail barley) and Atriplex triangularis (orache) were found to be limited by another factor other than nitrogen availability. In other words, different species are limited by different factors within an inland salt marsh ecosystem, providing competitive advantages and allowing for the occupation of different niches.

There have also been efforts to apply GIS and remote sensing methods to characterize the soil chemistry of inland salt marshes.

== Conservation and management ==
Inland salt marshes are quite rare and have unique conservation needs, yet there is a severe lack of research on these ecosystems.

Protected by the European Natura 2000 network and classified as a G1 category endangered ecosystem, there is a strong need to protect these rare, decreasing ecosystems, yet a lack of available research supports these conservation initiatives. One study aimed to address this gap with a case study in Central Europe; interdisciplinary analysis of various salt marsh conditions suggested that regular flooding of the inland salt marsh with nearby brine, in this case from a nearby health center, could be used to restore endangered inland salt marshes.

== See also ==
- Sor (geomorphology)
