= Dead Kultuk =

Bay on the coast of Kazakhstan

- Өліқолтық
- Óliqoltyq (Kazakh)
- Location in the Caspian Sea
- Location: Mangystau Region, Kazakhstan
- Coordinates: 45°25′17″N 54°1′50″E
- Ocean/sea sources: Caspian Sea
- Basin countries: Kazakhstan
- Surface area: 500 km^{2} (190 sq mi)
- Average depth: 1 m (3 ft 3 in)
- Islands: Durneva Island
- Settlements: 0

The Dead Kultuk (Kazakh: Өліқолтық Ölıqoltyq; Russian: Мёртвый Култук) is a bay of the Caspian Sea in the coast of Kazakhstan, west of the Ustyurt desert.

The bay was known as 'Tsesarevich Bay' and then as 'Komsomolets Bay' in the past. Durneva Island lies near the entrance to the Dead Kultuk.

It had a distinct coastline in former times, but since the 1990s, with higher Caspian Sea levels, the water penetrates inland through the neck of the bay producing waterlogged marshes. Located at the mainland end of the bay, the Kaydak Inlet cuts deep into the coast extending east and then southwards. Nowadays both the bay and the inlet are filled with Caspian Sea water. Currently there are oil fields in the area. By 2010, with the fall in the level of the Caspian Sea Kaydak and Dead Kultuk have again dried up, turning into a large sor (salt flat).

== Cartography ==
Owing to its special colour the Dead Kultuk is the bay which appears in early maps of the Caspian Sea as 'Blue Sea' (French: Mer Bleue in maps in that language). The area was mapped by Fedor Ivanovich Soimonov during the Caspian Expedition, which surveyed the Caspian Sea from 1719 to 1727, but was not accurately described until G. S. Karelin did so in 1832.

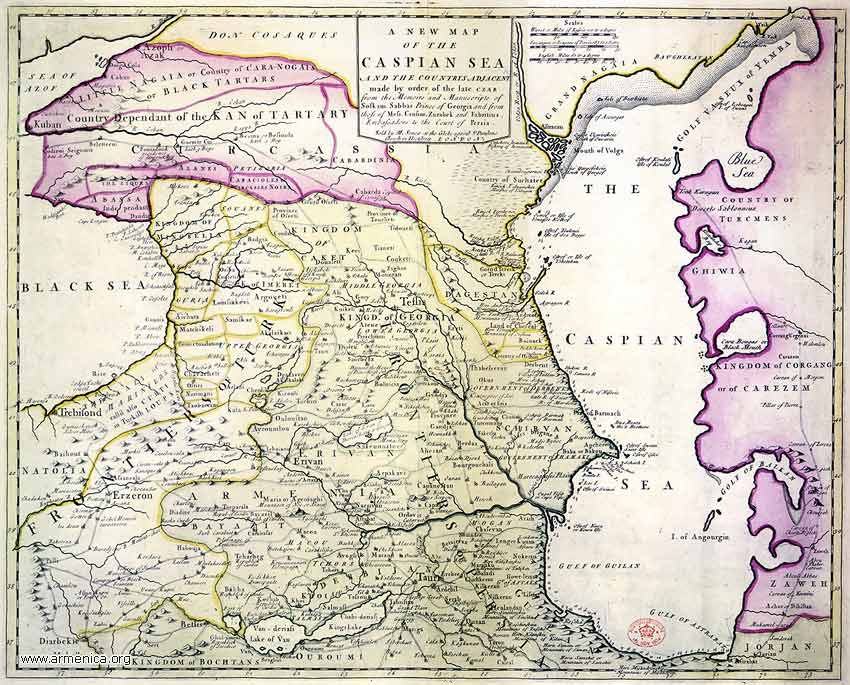
1742 map of the Caspian Sea with the Dead Kultuk as 'Blue Sea'.

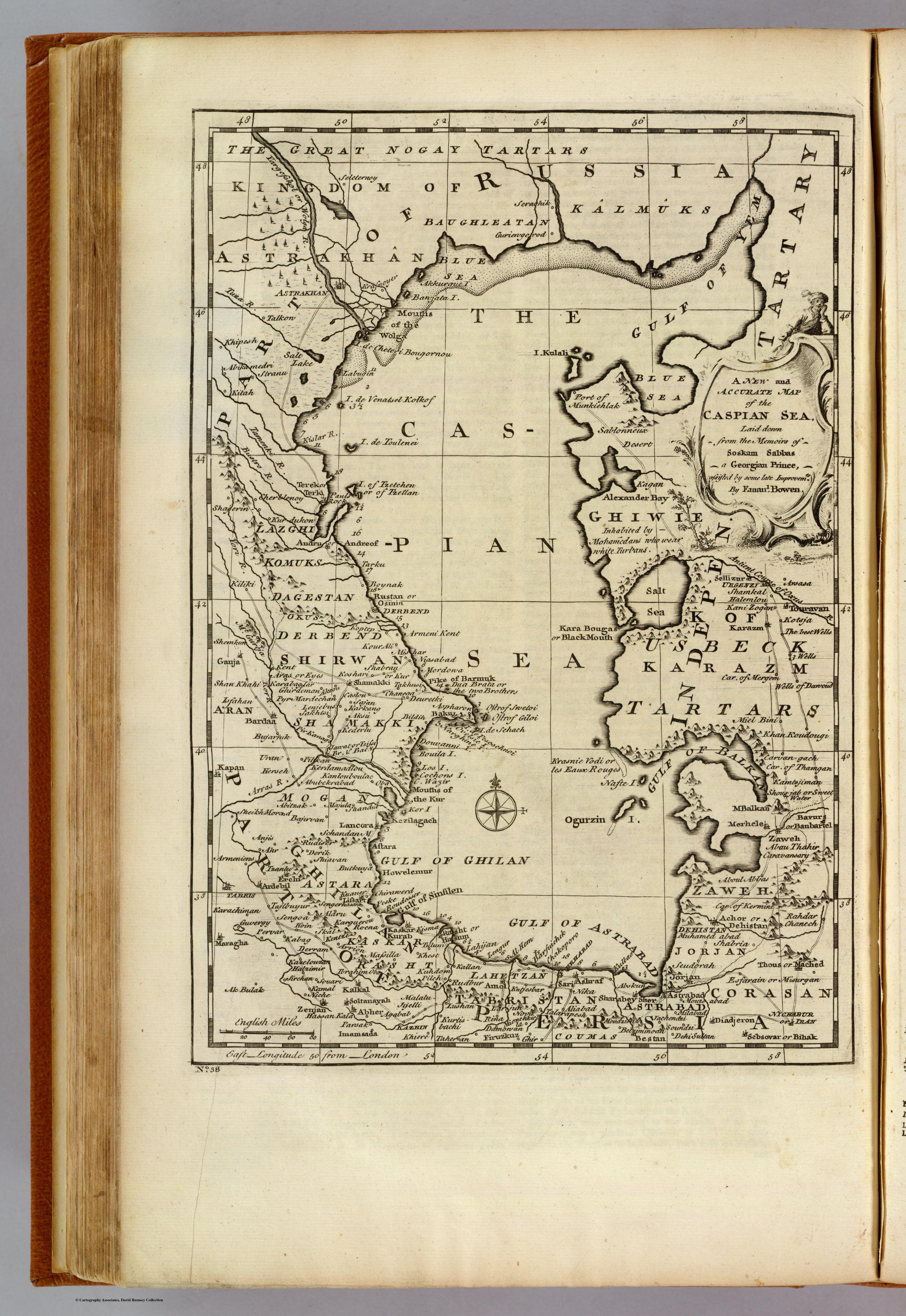
1747 map with the Dead Kultuk as 'Blue Sea'.

== See also ==
- Buzachi Peninsula
- Dunga oil field
