= Sor (geomorphology) =

Closed drainless depression characteristic of the Central Asian deserts

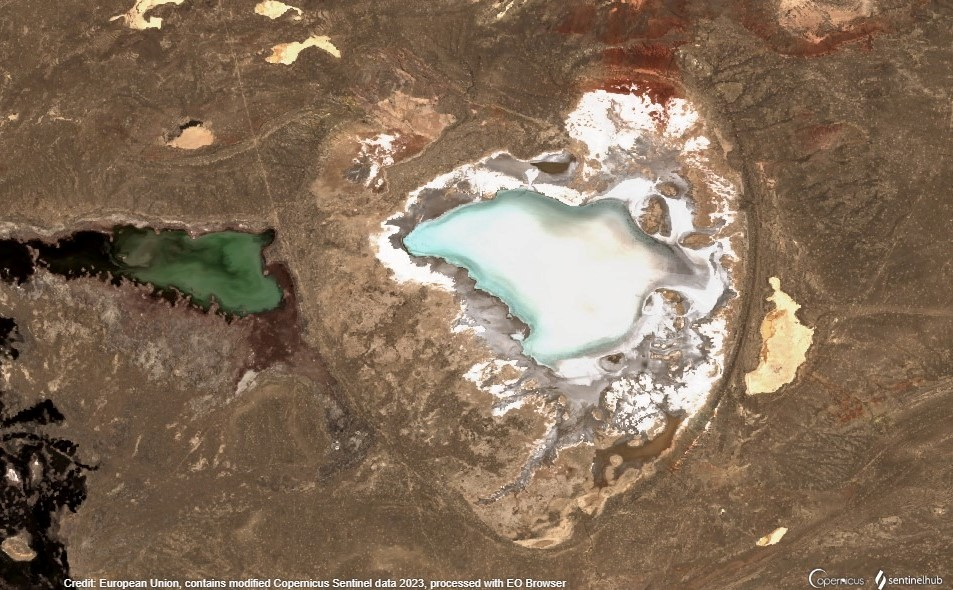
The Buralkynyn Tuzy, a sor in the Betpak-Dala desert near the lower Chu River.

A sor (Kazakh: сор; Turkmen: шор) is a closed drainless depression characteristic of the Central Asian deserts, found especially in Kazakhstan. The sor area is seasonally flooded, forming a lake, which becomes an inland salt marsh and then a salt flat as it dries.

The term forms part of some toponyms of Kazakhstan, such as Altybaysor, Aralsor, Atansor, Azhibeksor, Bauzhansor, Karasor, Koksengirsor, Mangisor, Maysor, Meshkeysor, Shandaksor, Sholaksor, Shureksor, Sorasha, Sorkol, Sormoildy, Tuzdysor, Zhaltyrsor, Zhyngyldysor and Sor Tuzbair.

== Description ==
A sor forms in the flatland of arid areas or deserts. Heavy seasonal rains taking place usually in the spring bring the water to accumulate at the bottom of the depression. The intermittent lake is characterized by a clear-cut coastline. As the summer approaches the lake dries quickly owing to hot temperatures, forming a salt pan with a layer of salt of varying thickness. In the dry flat expanse the groundwater is located close to the surface.

Although usually a sor is located away from the seashore, an inlet in the southern coast of the Dead Kultuk had the characteristics of a sor and was known as "Sor Kaydak". However, from around 1990 to 2010 it lost its distinct shoreline owing to the rise of the level of the Caspian Sea and has become a salt marsh. From around 2010 onwards, Dead Kultuk and Sor Kaydak have both mostly dried up once again due to the level of the Caspian Sea falling.

== Flora ==
Located in areas of sparse vegetation, the typical sor landscape is quite barren. Tough halophytes such as Halocnemum are among the only species able to grow in such an environment.

== See also ==
- Inland salt marsh
- Solonchak
