= Tyuleny Archipelago =

Tyuleniy Archipelago
Kazakh: Түлен аралдары
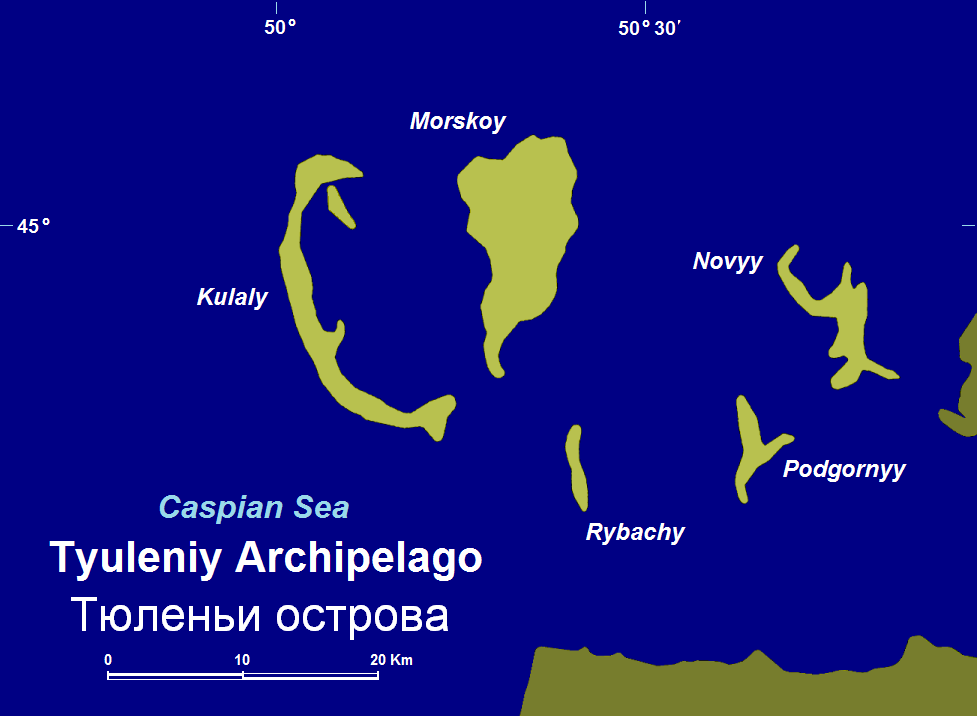
- Islands of the Tyuleniy Archipelago

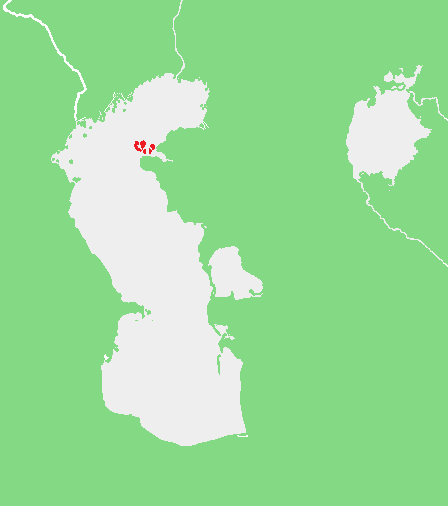
- Location of the Tyuleniy Archipelago in the Caspian Sea.

Geography
- Location: Caspian Sea,
- Coordinates: 44°55′N 50°22′E
- Area: 130 km^{2} (50 sq mi)
- Highest elevation: 2 m (7 ft)

Administration
- Kazakhstan
- Region: Mangystau Region

Demographics
- Population: 5

The Tyuleniy Archipelago (Kazakh: Түлен аралдары Tülen araldary, Russian: Тюленьи острова), is an island group in the north-eastern Caspian Sea off the Mangyshlak Bay west of the Mangyshlak Peninsula and about 13 kilometres (8.1 miles) northwest of the Tupkaragan Peninsula, 27 kilometres (17 miles) north of Bautino. Perhaps the most substantial group of islands in the Caspian, they were first accurately mapped by Fedor Ivanovich Soimonov who led the 1719 Caspian Expedition, studying the Caspian Sea from 1719 to 1727.

Administratively, the Tyuleniy Archipelago belongs to the Mangystau Region of Kazakhstan. It was named "Tyuleniy" —meaning "seal"— after the currently endangered Caspian seal.

== Islands ==
- Kulaly Island (Kulaly-Aral) is the westernmost and longest island, stretching 25 km (16 mi) from tip to tip. Its shape is slightly irregular, with inlets and headlands. There is a meteorological station with a lighthouse and a Kazakh border guard post on this island, making it the only one in the group inhabited by man. The terrain on Kulaly is either arid or waterlogged and reed-covered.
- Morskoy Island (Morskoy Aral) is the next island and the second largest island. It is also the biggest in area, with a length of 19 km (12 mi) and a maximum width of 7 km (4.3 mi). This island consists mostly of wetland.
- Rybachy Island (formerly Ostrov Svyatoy) is long and narrow and is south of Morskoy.
- Podgornyy Island is northeast of Rybachy.
- Novyy Island is the easternmost island. It is between Podgorny and the mainland and used to have an irregular shape until about 2009. Recent pictures show that this island has eroded heavily.

== Ecology ==
The islands are desert-like and sandy, with little grass. There are reeds on the leeward side of Kulaly as well as on the other islands, which are much lower and waterlogged. In past centuries many Caspian seals came to the islands' shores, hence the name of the group.

The islands have been declared an Important Bird Area and a National Protected Zone (State Reservation). There are large concentrations of seagulls and wetland birds, like coots, wild ducks, swans, egrets, and waders in the archipelago during their nesting period. The Tyuleniy island group is also an important breeding ground for the Sandwich tern (Thalasseus sandvicensis).

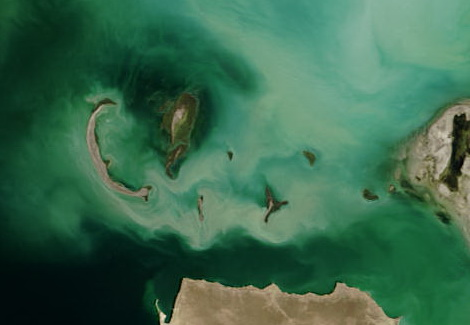
NASA image of the archipelago and nearby shores. Note the size of Novyy Island.

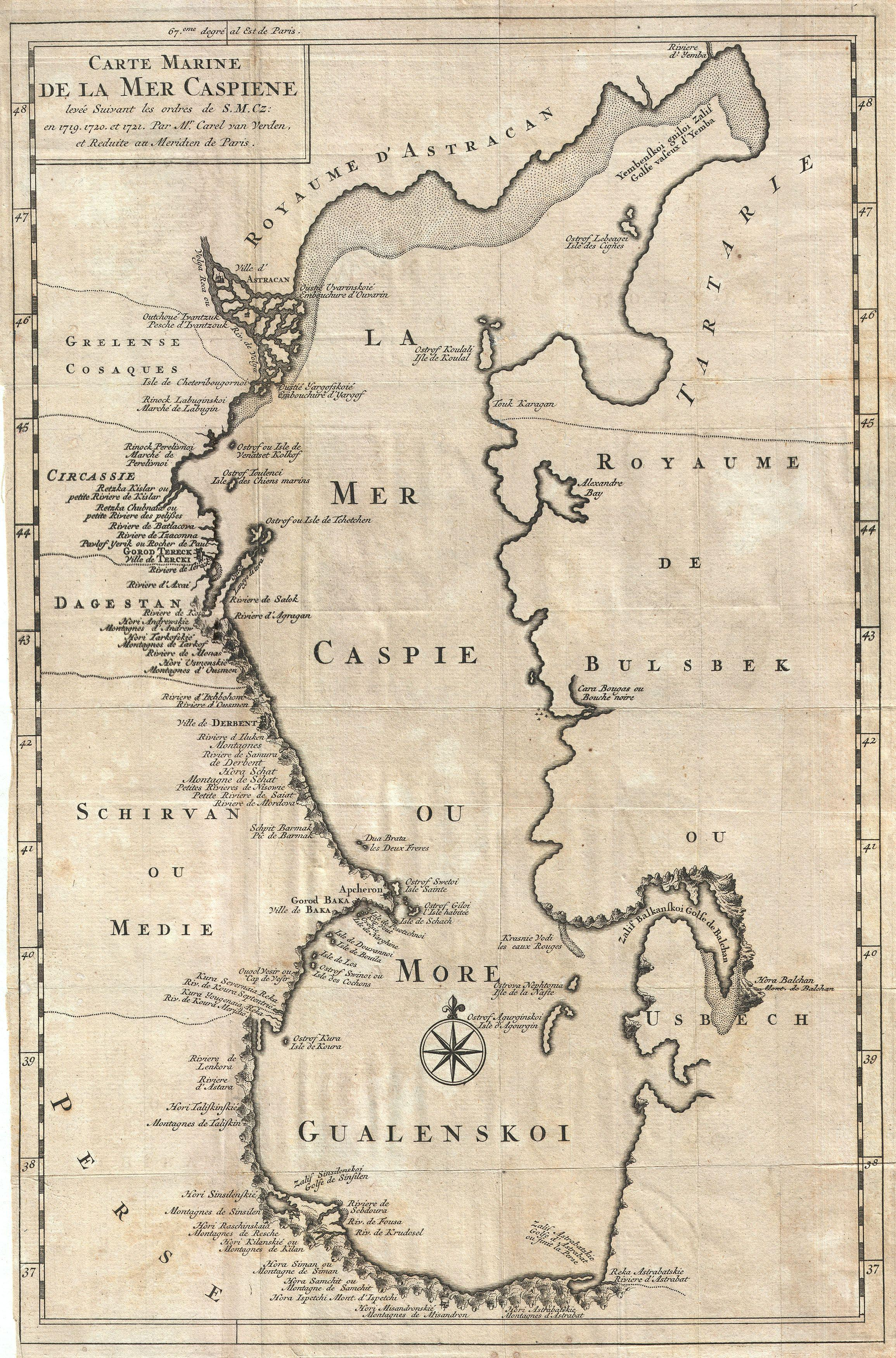
1721 Van Verden map of the Caspian Sea in which Kulaly is the only island of the archipelago that is named.

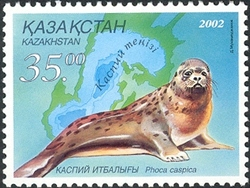
The archipelago is named after the Caspian seal (Pusa caspica)
