= Aktau =

Aktau Aqtau / Ақтау (Kazakh)
- City
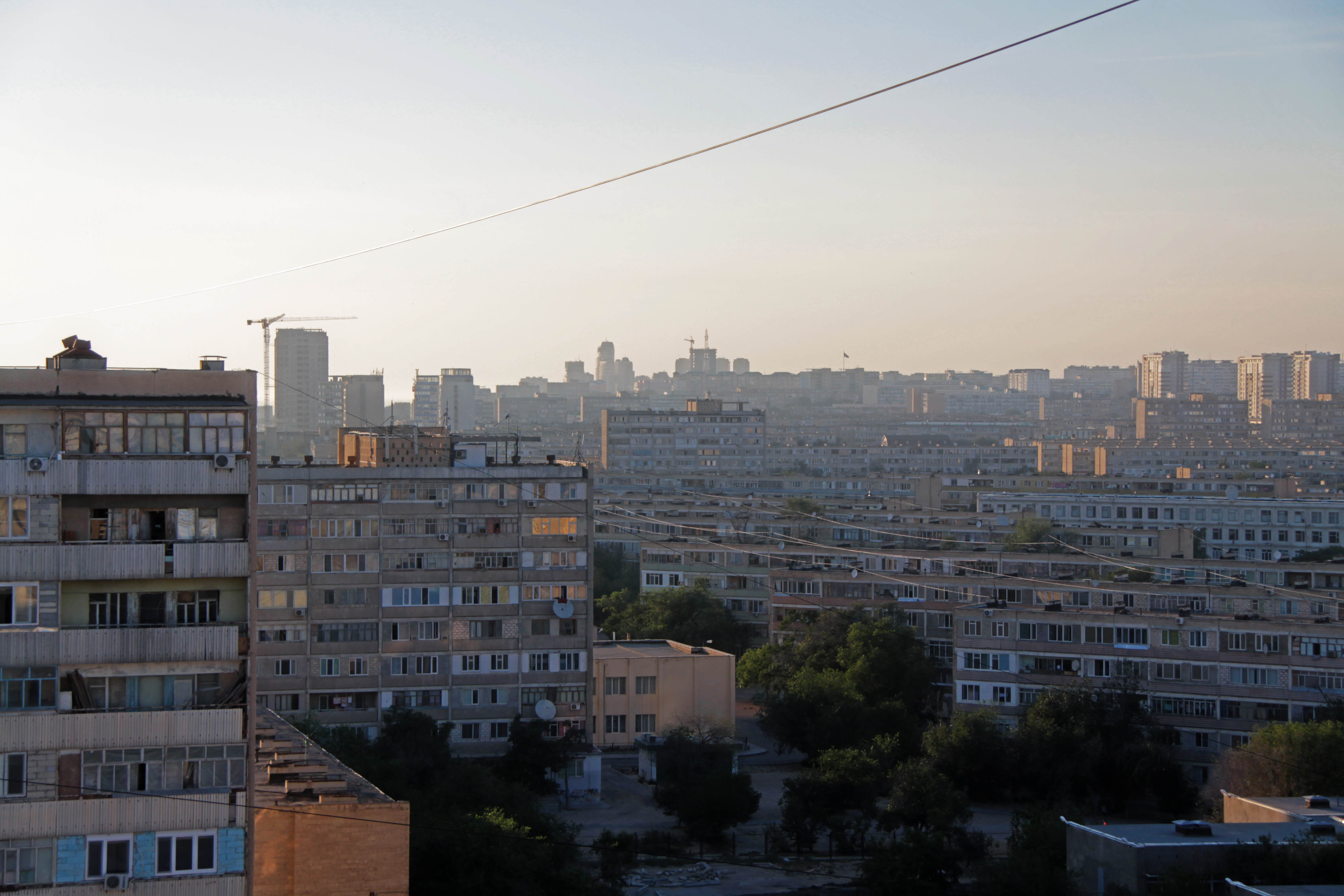
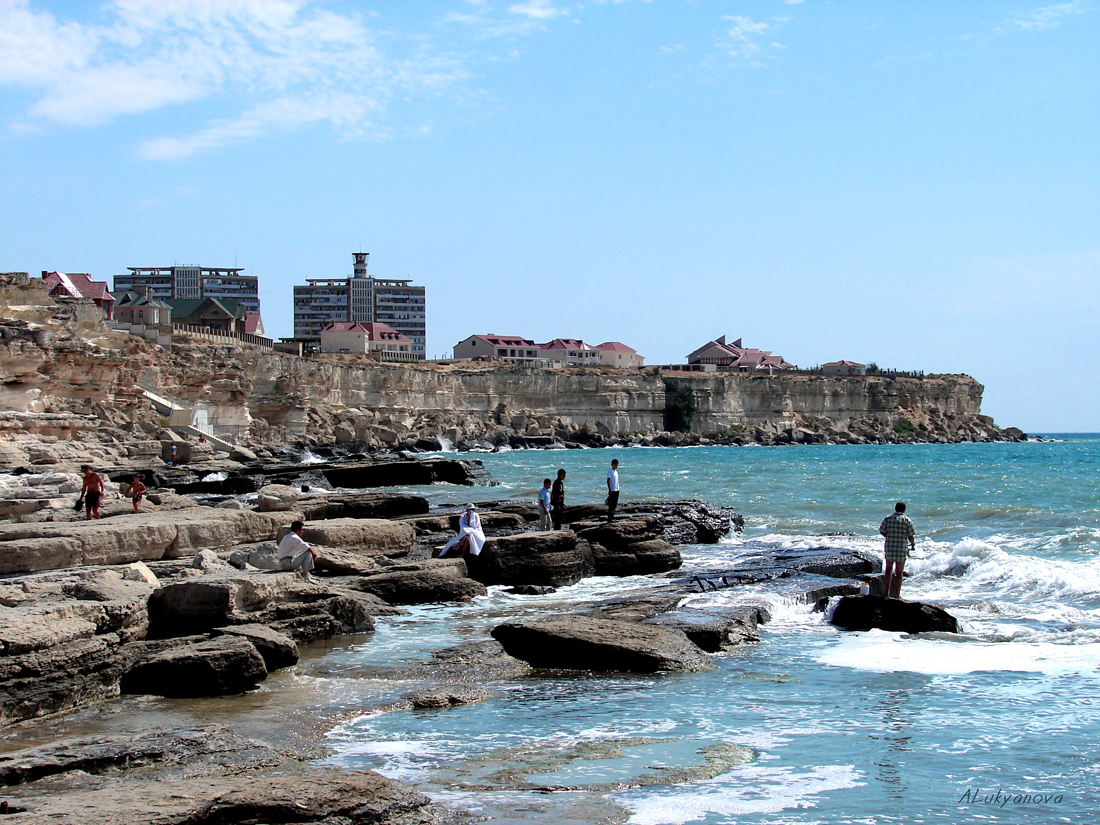
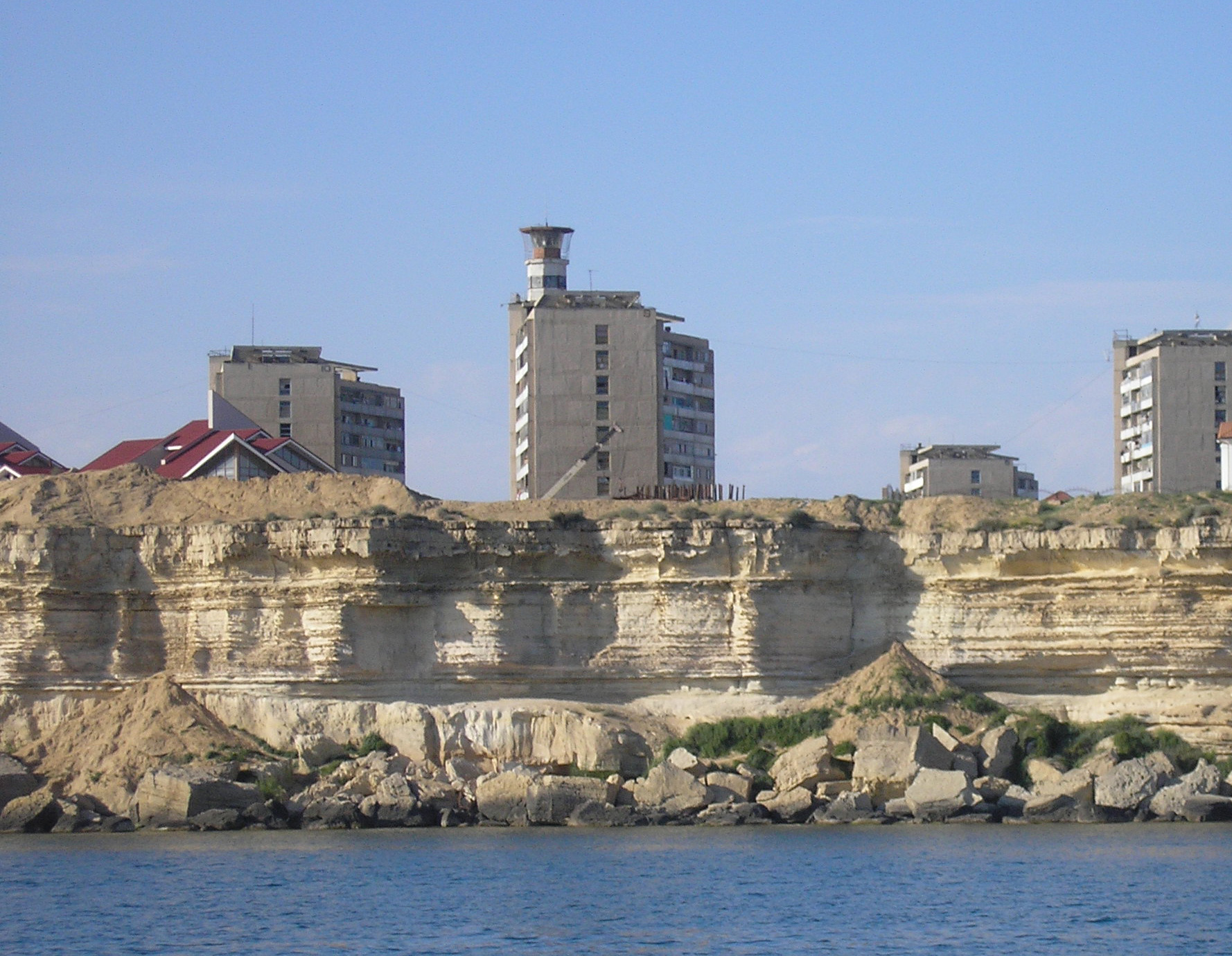
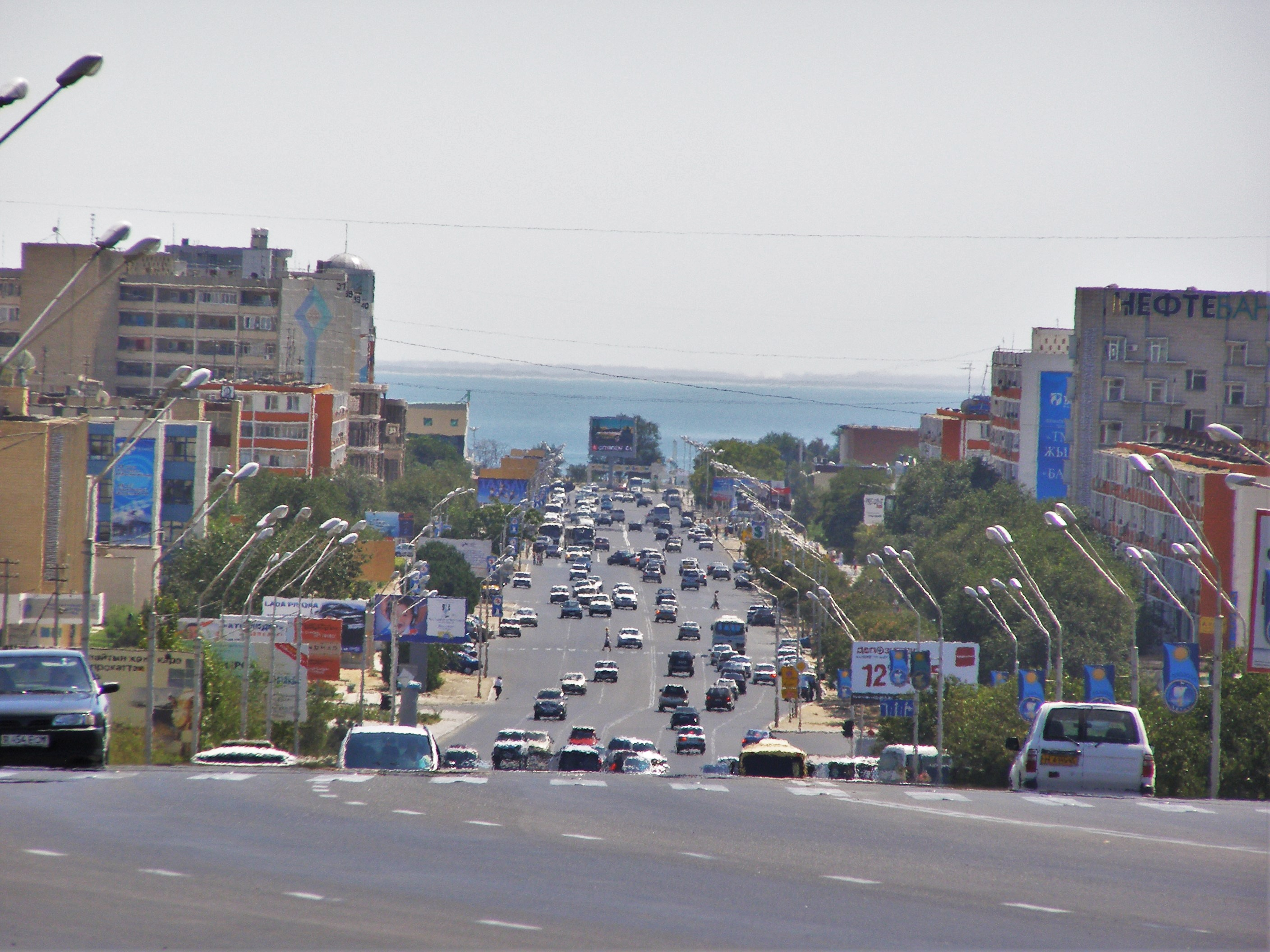
- From top left to down right: Skyline of Aktau, the Rocky shore of the Caspian Sea, The Lighthouse, Main Street leading to the Port with the Caspian Sea in the background

- Seal

- Location in Kazakhstan Aktau (Asia)
- Coordinates: 43°39′09″N 51°09′27″E
- Country: Kazakhstan
- Region: Mangystau Region
- Founded: 1958

Government
  - Akim (mayor): Abilkair Baipakov

Area
  - Total: 77 km^{2} (30 sq mi)
- Elevation: −8 m (−26 ft)

Population (2023)
  - Total: 270,886
  - Density: 3,500/km^{2} (9,100/sq mi)
- Time zone: UTC+05:00 (Kazakhstan Time)
- Postal code: 130000
- Area code: +7 7292
- Vehicle registration: 12, R
- Climate: BWk
- HDI (2023): 0.829 high · 4th
- GDP (nominal): 2022
  - Total: ▲$9,6 billion (KZT 4 401 192,9 million)
  - Per capita: ▲$12,799 (KZT 5 817,8 thousand)
- Website: aktau.gov.kz

Aktau (/ˌɑːkˈtaʊ/, UK also /ˌækˈtaʊ/; Kazakh: Ақтау, romanized: Aqtau, pronounced [ɑqtɑ́w]) is a major port city in southwestern Kazakhstan, on the eastern shore of the Caspian Sea. Aktau is on the Mangyshlak Peninsula in the Mangystau Region.

== Etymology ==
The name of the city, meaning "white hills", comes from the hills that separate Mangyshlak Peninsula and Buzachi Peninsula. From 1964 to 1991, the city was named Shevchenko, after the Ukrainian poet Taras Shevchenko, who was exiled nearby in a settlement about 100 kilometres (62 mi) to the northwest.

== History ==
The area of present-day Aktau has been inhabited since the Neolithic period. Archaeological evidence from the surrounding Mangystau region includes ancient necropolises such as Beket-Ata and Shakpak-Ata, sacred underground mosques carved into limestone, which reflect the spiritual and cultural traditions of early Turkic and pre-Islamic civilizations. Additionally, the region lay along key branches of the ancient Silk Road, serving as a strategic point between Central Asia and the Caspian Sea.

The territory of what is now Aktau was once inhabited by ancient tribes of Scythians. Archeological finds in the area include old settlements and utensils. The current territory of Mangystau Region hosted a spur route of the northern silk road, which resulted in the founding of several Sufi shrines in Aktau's vicinity. However, the area had very little population prior to Soviet times and no cities of any relevancy, almost certainly due to the scarcity of fresh water.

=== Soviet period ===
In 1958, uranium prospectors settled the site of modern Aktau, naming the settlement Melovoye after the bay on which it stood. After the development of the uranium deposits was started, the settlement was closed and renamed Guryev-20. In 1963, its closed status was lifted, town status was granted, and the name was changed to Aktau. However, in 1964 it was given yet another name, Shevchenko, to honor the Ukrainian poet Taras Shevchenko who spent 1850–1857 in political exile in Novopetrovskoye, about 100 km (62 mi) to the northwest.

=== Post-independence period ===
After the dissolution of the Soviet Union and Kazakhstan gaining independence, the name Aktau was restored in 1991, but the city's airport still retains SCO as its IATA code.

==== Aktau-City project ====
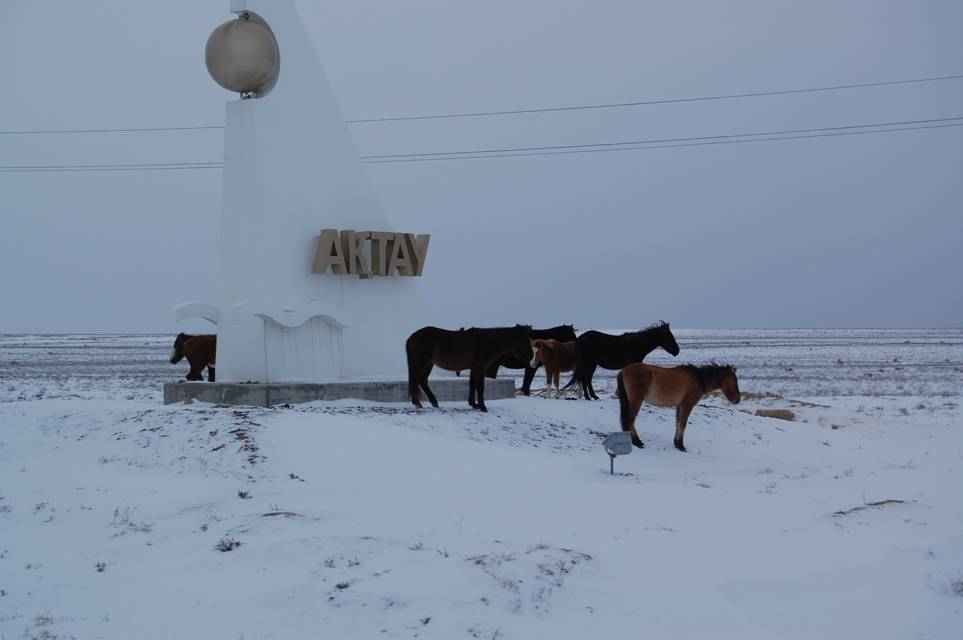
Entrance to the city

On September 11, 2007, President Nursultan Nazarbayev started the Aktau city project in order to develop tourism and attract investment. A totally new city was to have been built to the north-west of the current city with 4 million square meters of new residential and business buildings. The architecture style would have been derived from UAE's construction experience under the patronage of Sheikh Abdullah ibn Zaid Al Nahayan. In August 2013, the project was called off.

==== 2017 time capsule opening ====
In 1967, the people of Aktau erected a time capsule to send a message to future generations of the Mangyshlak Peninsula, including names of people who helped to build the town in the desert. The letter was put in a metallic cylinder in a triangular marble urn. It was opened in November 2017. The capsule is located in District 2, opposite the Kazakhstan Trade Center.

A ceremony to open the capsule was arranged and people traveled from far and wide to attend. This was subsequently postponed and then cancelled when it became known that capsule was, in fact, missing. Previously the capsule had been buried in another part of the town but building works in that location caused it to be relocated to the District 2 location. The capsule did not make the move. An official from the time of the creation of the capsule who had been involved in the drafting of a message to be included within the capsule was able to remember word for word the message that was written which by all accounts contained a theme of hope for the future.

The text is now shown in Mangystau regional museum.

== Climate ==
Aktau

Climate chart (precipitation, max. and min. temperature)
| J | F | M | A | M | J | J | A | S | O | N | D |
| 11 2 −3 | 11 4 −3 | 14 9 2 | 14 16 9 | 15 21 14 | 10 27 19 | 5 30 21 | 4 30 21 | 6 24 15 | 10 18 9 | 14 10 3 | 15 4 −2 |
- █ Average max. and min. temperatures in °C
- █ Precipitation totals in mm
- Source: http://www.pogodaiklimat.ru/climate/38111.htm
Imperial conversion
| J | F | M | A | M | J | J | A | S | O | N | D |
| 0.4 36 26 | 0.4 39 27 | 0.6 48 35 | 0.6 61 47 | 0.6 70 57 | 0.4 80 67 | 0.2 86 71 | 0.2 85 70 | 0.2 76 60 | 0.4 64 49 | 0.6 49 37 | 0.6 40 29 |
- █ Average max. and min. temperatures in °F
- █ Precipitation totals in inches

Aktau experiences a cold desert climate (Köppen BWk), with warm to hot dry summers and cold winters, with a mean January temperature of −0.5 °C (31.1 °F), and a mean July temperature of +25.55 °C (77.99 °F). It is notable that most of the city of Aktau lies below sea level in the Caspian Depression and is proximate to the lowest point in Kazakhstan and the former Soviet Union at Karagiye.

Oasis Apartment Complex

Climate data for Aktau (1991–2020, extremes 1960–present)
| Month | Jan | Feb | Mar | Apr | May | Jun | Jul | Aug | Sep | Oct | Nov | Dec | Year |
|---|---|---|---|---|---|---|---|---|---|---|---|---|---|
| Record high °C (°F) | 16.0 (60.8) | 21.6 (70.9) | 28.1 (82.6) | 31.5 (88.7) | 39.5 (103.1) | 43.1 (109.6) | 43.0 (109.4) | 44.1 (111.4) | 39.2 (102.6) | 32.8 (91.0) | 22.5 (72.5) | 17.7 (63.9) | 44.1 (111.4) |
| Mean daily maximum °C (°F) | 2.0 (35.6) | 4.1 (39.4) | 10.3 (50.5) | 16.9 (62.4) | 23.5 (74.3) | 28.9 (84.0) | 31.9 (89.4) | 30.9 (87.6) | 25.2 (77.4) | 17.8 (64.0) | 9.3 (48.7) | 3.9 (39.0) | 17.1 (62.7) |
| Daily mean °C (°F) | −1.0 (30.2) | 0.2 (32.4) | 6.1 (43.0) | 12.4 (54.3) | 18.8 (65.8) | 24.0 (75.2) | 26.4 (79.5) | 25.6 (78.1) | 19.9 (67.8) | 12.9 (55.2) | 5.3 (41.5) | 0.5 (32.9) | 12.6 (54.7) |
| Mean daily minimum °C (°F) | −3.6 (25.5) | −3.0 (26.6) | 2.7 (36.9) | 8.9 (48.0) | 15.1 (59.2) | 19.9 (67.8) | 21.9 (71.4) | 21.3 (70.3) | 15.3 (59.5) | 8.8 (47.8) | 2.0 (35.6) | −2.3 (27.9) | 8.9 (48.0) |
| Record low °C (°F) | −24.0 (−11.2) | −24.0 (−11.2) | −17.2 (1.0) | −4.4 (24.1) | 3.2 (37.8) | 6.7 (44.1) | 10.0 (50.0) | 10.0 (50.0) | 0.0 (32.0) | −7.0 (19.4) | −16.0 (3.2) | −18.0 (−0.4) | −24.0 (−11.2) |
| Average precipitation mm (inches) | 17.6 (0.69) | 12.0 (0.47) | 15.1 (0.59) | 17.6 (0.69) | 13.3 (0.52) | 11.7 (0.46) | 10.1 (0.40) | 8.1 (0.32) | 7.1 (0.28) | 13.2 (0.52) | 21.7 (0.85) | 21.1 (0.83) | 168.7 (6.64) |
| Average precipitation days (≥ 1.0 mm) | 4.5 | 3.1 | 3.2 | 2.7 | 2.2 | 1.5 | 1.5 | 1.1 | 1.5 | 2.4 | 4.2 | 4.6 | 32.5 |
Source 1: Pogoda.ru.net
Source 2: NOAA

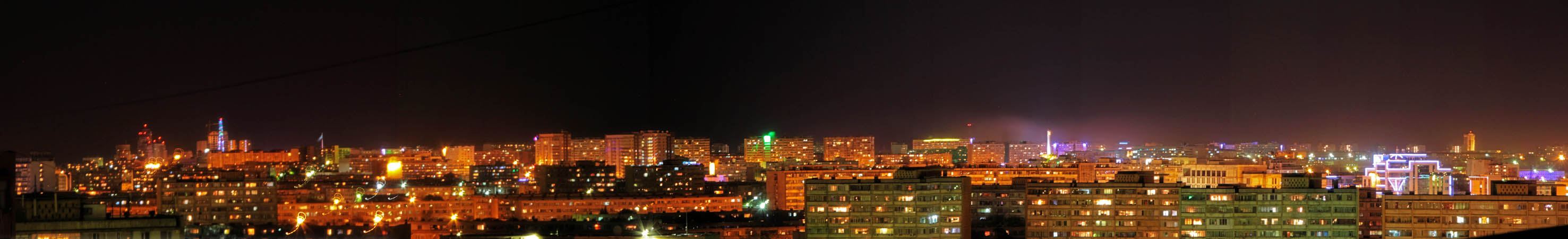
Panorama of Aktau at night

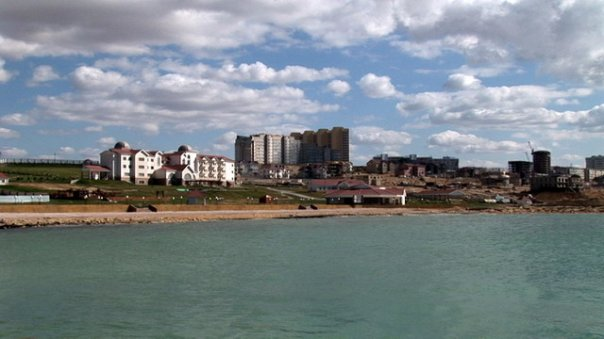
View of the seaside

== Economy ==
=== Industry ===
The major industry of the city remains hydrocarbon production; it is one of the biggest producing regions of the country.

In addition to its strategic location as the main seaport, Aktau has attracted the biggest players of the oil service industry:

- Schlumberger Caspian geomarket main base and pumps manufacturing
- Baker Hughes Caspian geomarket main base
- Halliburton Kazakhstan main base
- Weatherford International Kazakhstan main base
- Cameron International Kazakhstan main base
- Tenaris premium pipes threading facility
- ArcelorMittal pipelines manufacturing

==== Former nuclear power plant ====
Aktau was once the site of a nuclear power station. The BN-350 fast reactor went online in 1973, and was shut down in 1999. The long-term plans of the Government of Kazakhstan include the construction of a new nuclear power station to be built near the site. In addition to producing plutonium, BN-350 was used to provide power and for desalination to supply fresh water to the city. The current station is not considered powerful enough to supply the fresh water and energy needed at this time, and blackouts are a common occurrence.

== Culture ==
=== Tourism ===
Aktau's beaches are a major tourist attraction, and are most commonly visited from late May to late August, amid warmer weather. During this time, the water temperature of the Caspian Sea is typically around 18 °C (64 °F). Aktau has both rocky hills and sandy beaches along the seashore. Tourists come mainly from other parts of Kazakhstan. Major hotels in Aktau include the Aktau Hotel, the Renaissance Aktau, the Caspian Riviera Grand Palace, the Grand Hotel Victory, Grand Nur Plaza, and the Holiday Inn Aktau. In 2021, it was announced that three rare species of palms with resistance to freezing are being grown as part of an experiment in the Aktau region. The experiment is being performed by the city's Mangystau Experimental Botanical Garden.

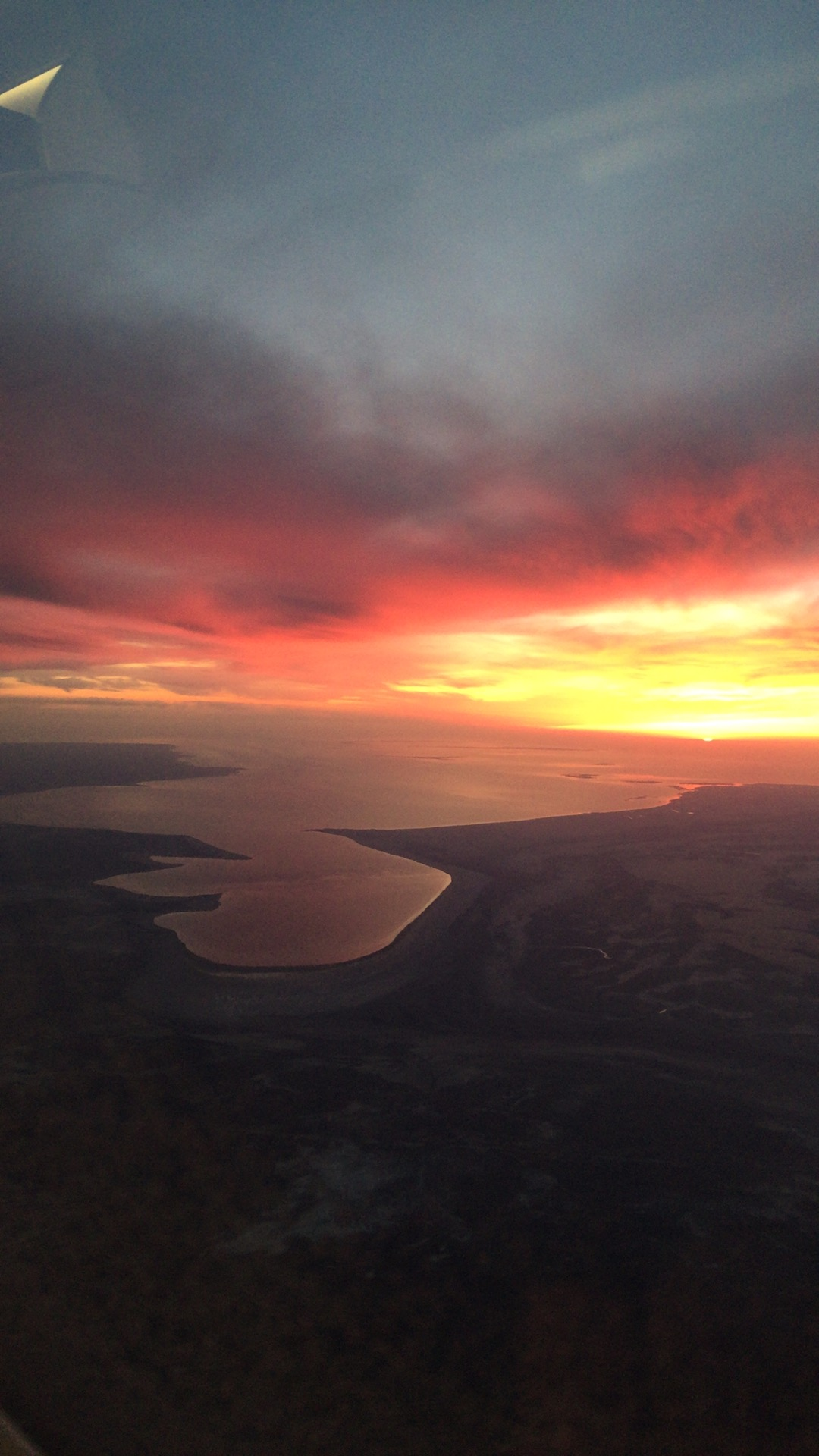
View of the steppe surrounding Aktau

Other sights include:

- World War II Eternal Flame Memorial in a shape reminiscent of a traditional yurt
- MiG Monument at the Victory Mall
- Regional Studies and History Museum
- The Drama Theatre
- Yntymak Square
- Monuments of famous people of the past: Kashagan, Zhalau Mynbayev and Taras Shevchenko

=== Sports ===
Aktau is the home of football club FC Caspiy. The club's home ground is Zhastar Stadium which has a capacity of 5,000. In 2019, they finished second place in the Kazakhstan First Division and gained outright promotion to the Kazakhstan Premier League, the top division of football in Kazakhstan.

=== Religion ===
The Mosque of Chahbagota is notable for having the portrayal of a human palm represented on its walls with lotus flowers, an oddity given that Islam generally prohibits the depiction of humans or parts of their anatomy.

== Transportation ==
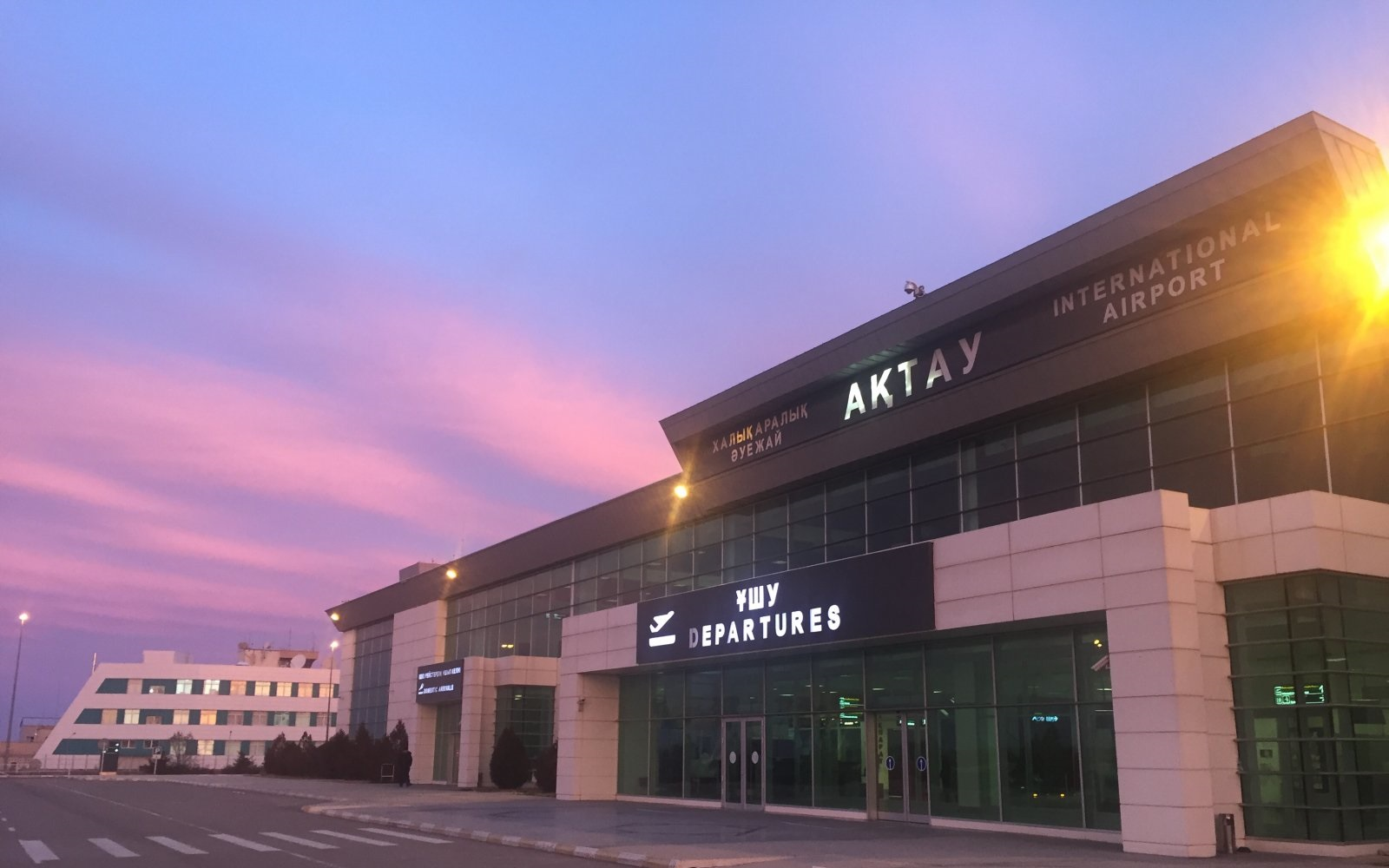
Aktau International Airport

=== Air ===
Aktau has an international airport that was built in 1996. On December 25, 2024, Azerbaijan Airlines Flight 8243 crashed in the vicinity.

=== Sea ===
Aktau is home to Port Aktau, an international seaport. Since the early 2000s, Kazakhstan's government has been implementing policies aimed at attracting investors and customers to the port. It has been attempting to halt the transit of grain through the Black Sea and instead use routes over the Caspian or via Turkmenistan. In 2015, Port Aktau was expanded to accommodate ever larger quantities and more diverse types of cargo. The intent is for cargo to transit by ship over the Caspian Sea and then by rail through Azerbaijan and Georgia for delivery in Turkey and beyond. This new route was made possible by the opening of a railway connecting Georgia and Turkey in 2014. Government authorities announced plans to expand the port further in late 2022, stating it will "improve capacity by more than 500 percent" by 2025. The port has received increased interest from international companies looking for routes to bypass Russia, following the outbreak of the Russian invasion of Ukraine.

=== Rail ===
The nearest train station is Mangystau station, in the suburb of Mangystau, about 20 kilometres (12 mi) away from Aktau's city center. The rail station is connected to the city center via shuttlebus. Trip from Aktau to Astana will take around 2 days, and to Almaty around three days.

=== Road ===
Aktau has a bus network, and is also serviced by taxis.

== Twin towns and sister cities ==
Aktau is twinned with:

- Sumqayit, Azerbaijan
- Bandar-e Anzali, Iran
- Karamay, China
- Huế, Vietnam
- Changwon, South Korea
- Samsun, Turkey
- Makhachkala, Russia
