= Dunga oil field =

Oil field in Mangystau, Kazakhstan

Dunga Oil Field
- Country: Kazakhstan
- Region: Mangystau Region
- Offshore/onshore: onshore
- Operator: Total S.A. - 60%, Partex - 20%, Oman Oil Company -20% ,

Field history
- Discovery: 1966
- Start of development: 1966
- Start of production: 1969

Production
- Current production of oil: 14,000 barrels per day (~7.0×10^{5} t/a)
- Estimated oil in place: 55.8 million tonnes (~ 64.9×10^{6} m^{3} or 408 million bbl)
- Estimated gas in place: 3.5×10^{9} m^{3} 121.8×10^{9} cu ft

The Dunga Oil Field is an oil field located in Mangystau Region. It was discovered in 1966 and developed by Total E&P Dunga GmbH, a part of Total S.A. The total proven reserves of the Dunga oil field are around 408 million barrels (55.8 million tonnes), and production is centered on 7,000 barrels per day (1,100 m^{3}/d).

== See also ==
- Dead Kultuk

Dead kuluruik
