= Nord-Ost-Kultuk =

Village in the Neftchala Rayon of Azerbaijan

- Location within Azerbaijan
- Coordinates: 39°29′29″N 49°15′47″E
- Country: Azerbaijan
- Rayon: Neftchala
- Time zone: UTC+4 (AZT)
  - Summer (DST): UTC+5 (AZT)

Nord-Ost-Kultuk (also, Kul’tuk and Nordostovyy Kultuk) is a village in the Neftchala Rayon of Azerbaijan.
