= Mangyshlak Peninsula =

Peninsula in western Kazakhstan at the Caspian Sea

Native name: Маңғыстау түбегі
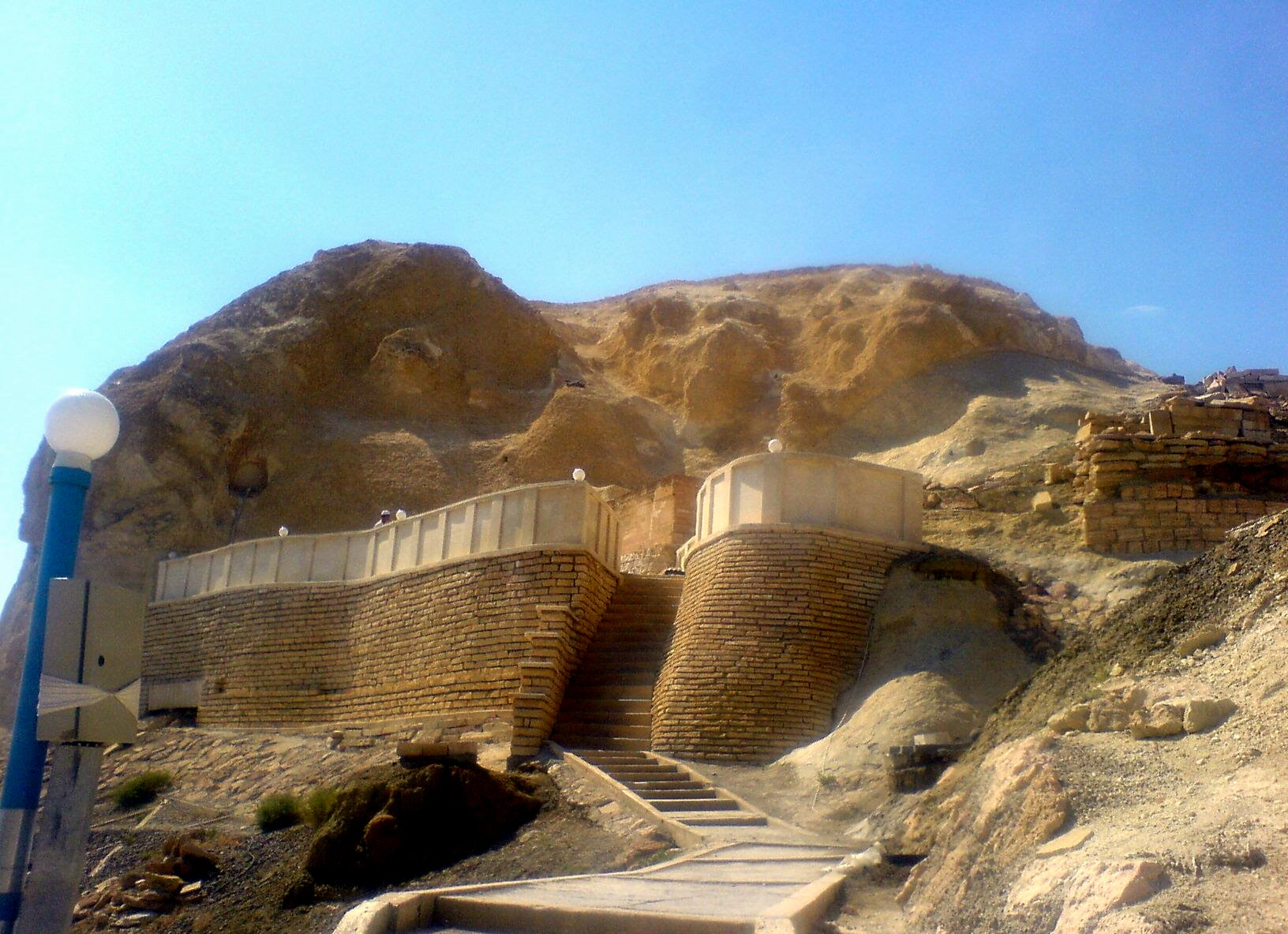

- Location within Caspian Sea

Geography
- Coordinates: 44°0′N 52°0′E

Administration
- Kazakhstan
- Region: Mangystau Region

Mangyshlak or Mangghyshlaq Peninsula (Kazakh: Маңғыстау түбегі, romanized: Mañğystau tübegı; Russian: Полуостров Мангышла́к, romanized: Poluostrov Mangyshlák) is a large peninsula located in western Kazakhstan. It borders on the Caspian Sea in the west and with the Buzachi Peninsula, a marshy sub-feature of the main peninsula, in the northeast. The Tyuleniy Archipelago lies off the northern shores of the peninsula.

The area is between desert and semidesert with a harsh continental dry climate. There are no rivers and no fresh water springs. Geologically, the Mangyshlak Peninsula is part of the Ustyurt Plateau. To the north, three mountain ranges stretch across the peninsula, the North and South Aktau Range and the Mangystau Range, with the highest point reaching 555 m. Administratively, the peninsula is in Kazakhstan's Mangystau Province. The largest city, and the capital of the province, is Aktau (formerly Shevchenko).

== Etymology ==
Several etymologies have been proposed for the name of the peninsula:

- The peninsula's name stems from Man Qışlağ, meaning "sheep wintering ground" in Turkic languages.
- The peninsula's name stems from Man Qışlağ, meaning "wintering ground of the Man people" in Turkic languages. 11th-century scholar Mahmud al-Kashghari, who mentioned the peninsula under the name Man Qışlağ (مان قشلاغ), suggested this theory.
- The peninsula's name stems from a distorted form of Menk Qışlağ, meaning "wintering ground of the Menk people" in Turkic languages, referring to the Menk tribe of the Nogai people.
- The peninsula's name stems from a distorted form of Mıñ Qışlağ, meaning "1000 winter encampments" in Turkic languages.

It was formerly also known as Siyāh-kōh (سیاه‌کوه, 'black mountain') in Persian.

== History ==
The Mangyshlak peninsula was overtaken in 1639 by Kalmyks.

Following the Russian conquest of Turkestan, several administrative reforms were instituted on the peninsula by the Russian authorities. These included the confiscation of pastureland, the construction of military settlements, the construction of a residence for the Junior jüz's leader, an increase in the kibitka tax to ₽3.50, the inclusion of the territory into the Uralsk Oblast, and restrictions on the freedom of the nomadic Adai tribes of the Junior jüz to migrate.

In 1870, in response to the aforementioned reforms, the Adai rebellion took place on the Mangyshlak peninsula. The Russian Empire called upon Cossack reinforcements from Dagestan to quell the rebellion, defeating it and brutally suppressing the Adai tribes. As punishment for the rebellion, the kibitka tax on the Adai was increased for a period of two years and 90,000 sheep were confiscated from them. The rebellion's leaders, including Dosan Tajiuly, Alghi Jalmaghambetuly, Isa Tilenbayuly, Erjan Qululy, and Ermaghambet Qululy, were all arrested and later died in Russian prisons.

Upon the Soviet takeover of Russian Turkestan, the territory of the Transcaspian Oblast, which contained the Mangyshlak Peninsula, was initially assigned to the Turkestan ASSR. In August 1920, at the request of Kazakh activists, Mangyshlak was transferred to the Kazakh ASSR.

== Cartography ==
The area was mapped by Fedor Ivanovich Soimonov during the Caspian Expedition, which surveyed the Caspian Sea from 1719 to 1727.

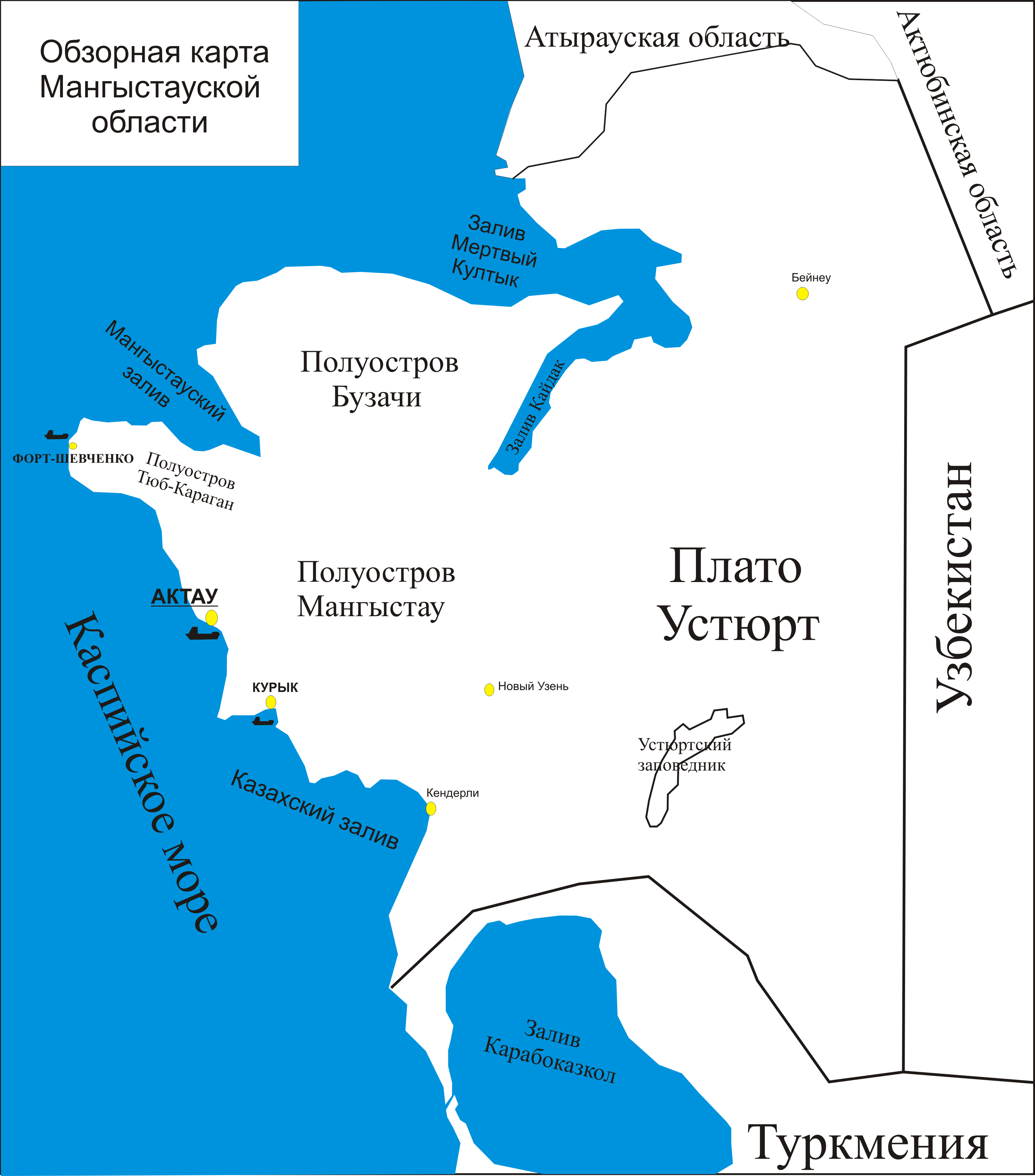
Map of the Mangyshlak Peninsula area showing the bays surrounding it.

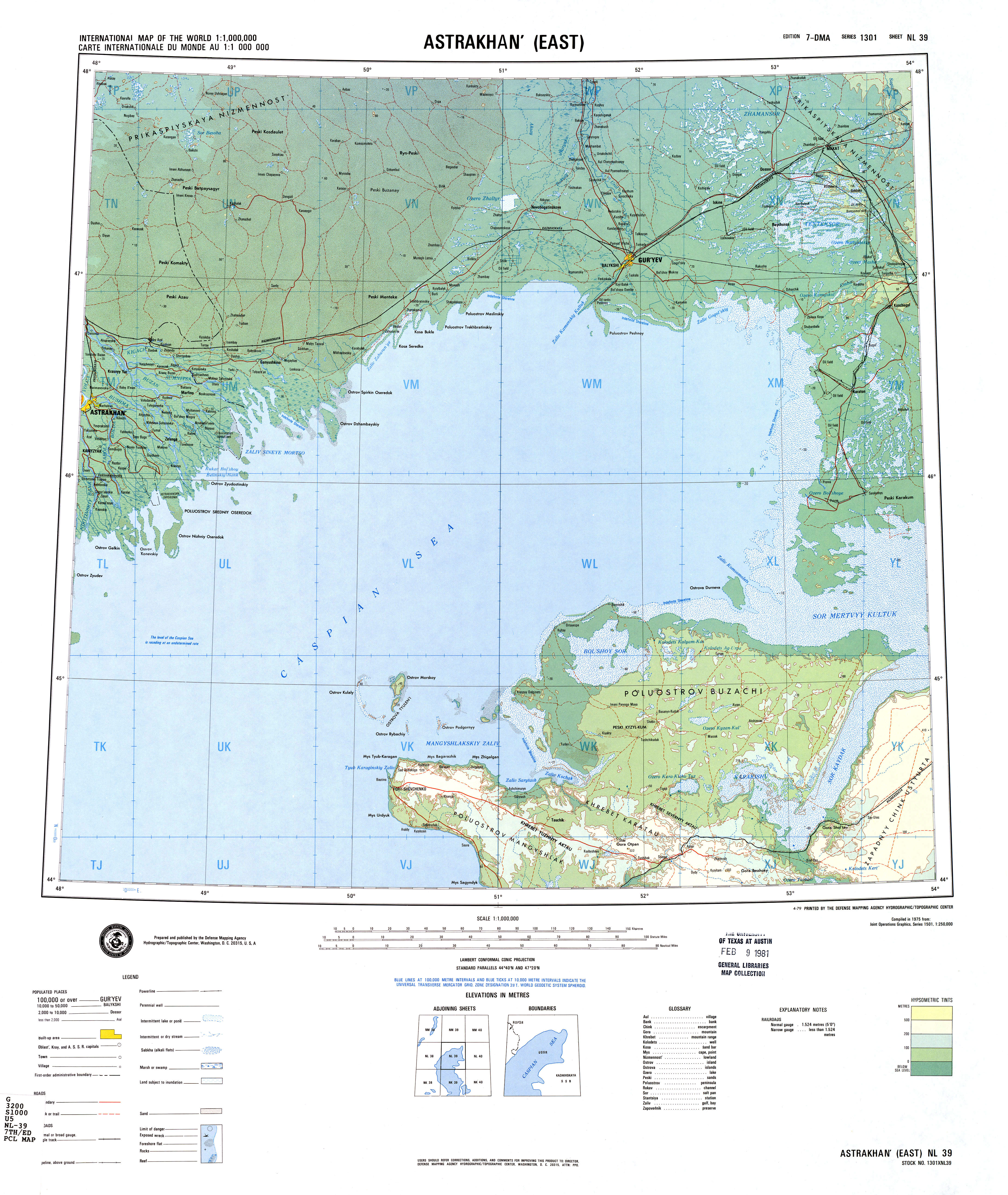
Map of the northeastern part of Caspian Sea with the Mangyshlak Peninsula at the bottom.
