= Fyodor Soimonov =

Russian hydrographer

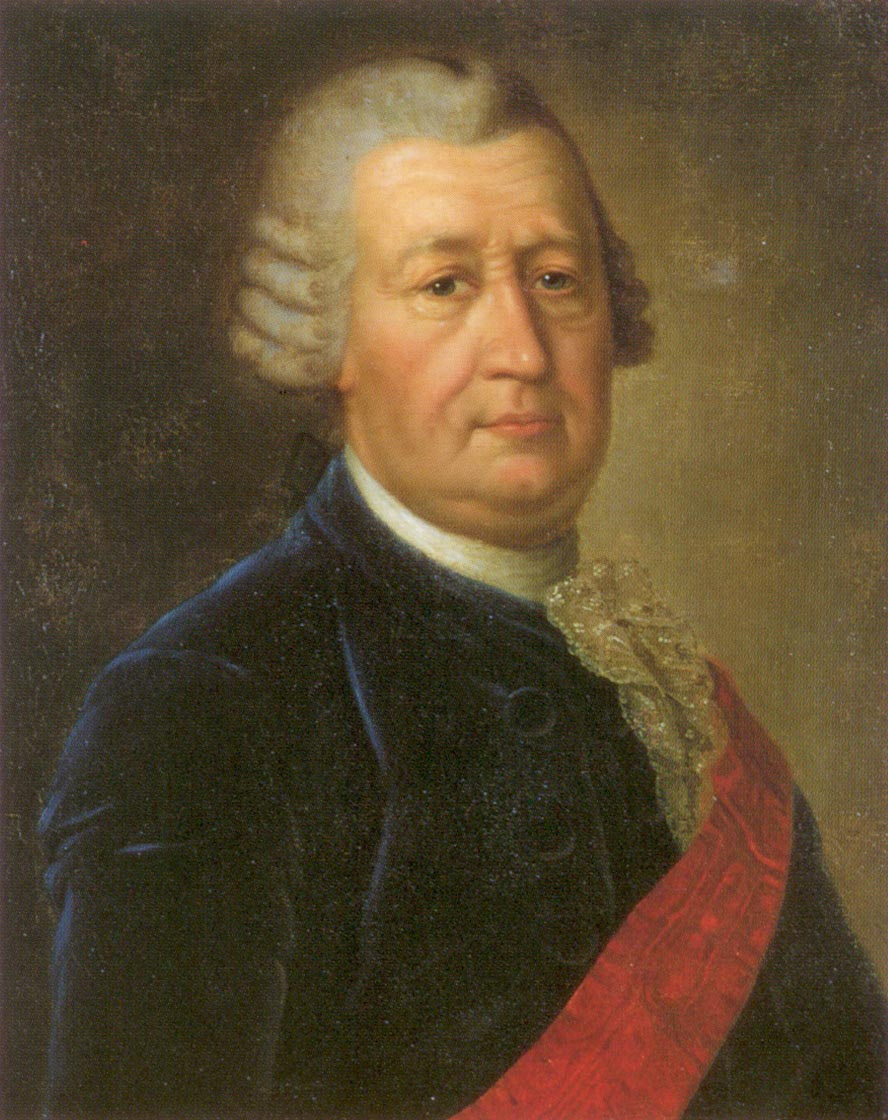
- Oil portrait of Fedor I. Soimonov around 1750
- Born: 1692 near Kherson, Ukraine
- Died: July 22, 1780 Serpukhov
- Allegiance: Russian Empire
- Branch: Imperial Russian Navy
- Rank: Vice-Admiral

(Russia) Chief of the Russian Admiralty Board
- In office 1739–1740

Governor of the Siberia Governorate
- In office 1757–1763

Personal details
- Awards: Order of St. Alexander Nevsky

Fyodor (or Fedor) Ivanovich Soimonov (Russian: Фёдор Иванович Соймо́нов; 1692–22 July 1780), Knight of the Order of St. Alexander Nevsky, was a nautical surveyor of the Imperial Russian Navy, hydrographer and pioneering explorer of the Caspian Sea who charted the until then little-known body of water. Soimonov was an important contributor to the improvement of navigation along the Russian coasts. As a cartographer he also mapped new territories in Siberia and contributed to the development of farming in that region. As a military man, he served in the Russian campaigns against Sweden and against the Safavid Empire and the Ottoman Turks

== Biography ==
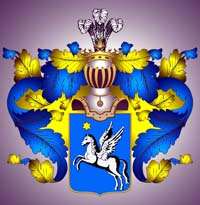
Arms of the Soimonov family

Fyodor Soimonov was born into a noble family. He became a graduate of the Moscow School of Navigation and went to the Netherlands for training.

Soimonov made the first thorough hydrographic survey of the Caspian Sea between 1719 and 1727, building up on the survey previously done by Karl Van Verden during Tsar Peter the Great's drive for reform and modernization at the beginning of the 18th century. He led the Caspian Expedition that explored the coasts of the sea. As a result of the survey, Soimonov drew a set of maps of the Caspian for the Atlas of the Caspian Sea (Atlas Kapiiskago Moria) and wrote the Pilot of the Caspian Sea, published in 1731 by the Russian Academy of Sciences. These became the first comprehensive report and the first modern maps of the Caspian in history. Between 1730 and 1738, he was employed as a cartographer for the Russian Admiralty Board, which had been established in 1718 by Peter I the Great.

Soimonov led the Russian Admiralty Board between 1739 and 1740, publishing Экстракт штурманского искусства. Из наук, принадлежащих к мореплаванию, сочинённый в вопросах и ответах для пользы и безопасности мореплавателей (An extract of the art of navigation. Of the sciences belonging to navigation, composed in questions and answers for the benefit and safety of seafarers) (St Petersburg, 1739).

In 1740 Soimonov fell from grace after having been accused of conspiring against Empress Anna of Russia's lover Ernst Johann von Biron. He was exiled to Okhotsk, the main Russian base on the Pacific coast at that time, where he was condemned to live as a serf. He regained freedom in 1749 under Empress Elizabeth of Russia's rule and went back to his estate in Moscow, where he kept a low profile until 1753, when he was appointed to lead the Nerchinsk Expedition and was sent to map the then little-explored area of the Amur River and its tributaries. He made the cartography of the Shilka, which was partly in Chinese territory, but was turned back when he reached its confluence with the Argun. As a result of these explorations he published the Atlas of Nerchinsk.

Soimonov was the governor of the Siberia Governorate between 1757 and 1763. During his tenure he earned a reputation as a competent administrator, fighting against corruption and pushing for the development of the vast region. From 1764 to 1766 he became a senator and Empress Catherine's chief counsellor for Siberian affairs. He accelerated the development of agriculture, establishing regulations for the allotment of land for farming and also publishing scientific works such as An Outline of Crops Growing in Siberia.

Under Catherine the Great, Soimonov also implemented the vision of the state by monitoring the advancement of Russian nautical schools. His task was meant to facilitate scientific exploration and geographic coverage of the new Russian territories by better preparing Russian captains and crews for shipping on the open seas. In 1766 he retired from active service owing to ill-health. He died in 1780 and was buried at the Vysotsky Monastery in Serpukhov.

== See also ==
- Caspian Sea
- Russian Hydrographic Service
