= Avalon Historico-Geographical Society =

- Formation: 2004
- Headquarters: Karaganda, Kazakhstan
- President: Vitaliy Shuptar

Avalon Historico-Geographical Society is a membership NGO, established in 2004 and based in Karaganda, Kazakhstan. Its main fields of activities include various expeditions in Kazakhstan and abroad, including bicycle ones ("Bronze Ring of Sary-Arka" and "To the Center of Kazakh Land" were among the most important of them), development of ecotourism (Kyzylarai and Ulytau mountain oases mainly) and bicycle infrastructure in Central Kazakhstan, publishing in tourism and travels ("Discovery Kazakhstan" and "Discovery Tajikistan" guide-books).

== Expeditions ==
The "Bronze Ring of Sary-Arka" bicycle expedition (2008) had its route (about 1000 km) through the most interesting natural and archaeological sights of Central Kazakhstan, including monuments of the Bronze Age Begazy-Dandybai culture.

Avalon was a Kazakhstani partner of the "Steppe by Steppe, Side by Side" expedition of Roger Chao and Megan Kerr (Australia).
