= Chertovy Vorota Cave =

Cave and archaeological site in Russia

- Пещера Чертовы Ворота
- Devil's Gate Cave
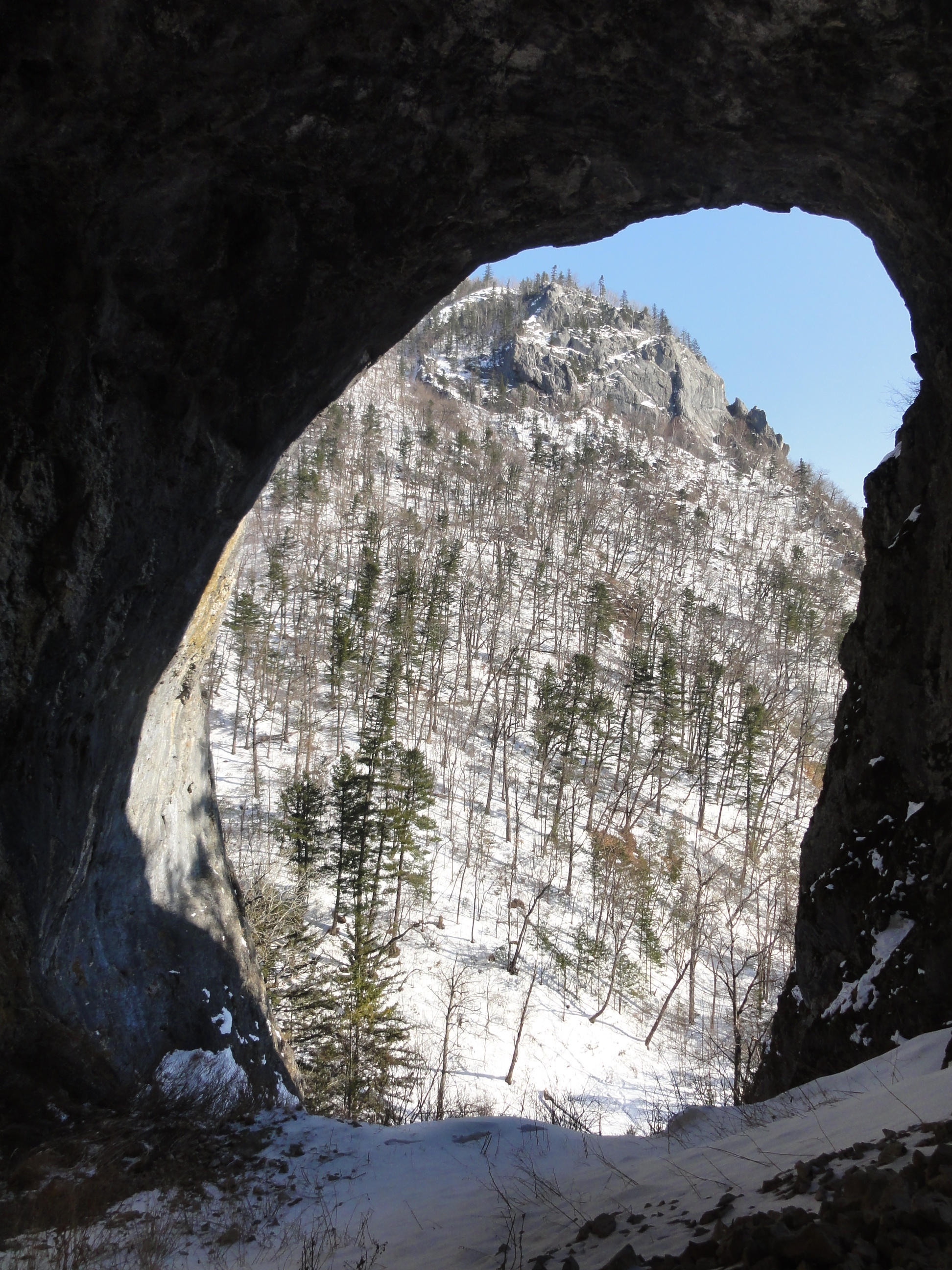

- Location within Primorsky Krai Location within Far Eastern Federal District Location within Russia
- 44°29′N 135°23′E
- Type: karst cave
- Periods: Neolithic
- Cultures: Rudninskaya (Rudnaya) culture
- Location: Primorsky Krai, Russia
- Region: Sikhote-Alin

History
- Built: ca. 9,400 BP
- Abandoned: ca. 7,200 BP

Site notes
- Elevation: 660 m (2,170 ft)
- Height: 16 m (52 ft)
- Length: 132 m (433 ft)
- Width: 10 m (33 ft)
- Area: 730 m^{2} (7,858 sq ft)
- Volume: 2,950 m^{3} (104,178 cu ft)
- Excavation dates: 1973
- Archaeologists: Zhanna Vasilievna Andreeva

Chertovy Vorota Cave, also known as Devil's Gate Cave, is a Neolithic archaeological site located in the Sikhote-Alin mountains, about 12 km (7 mi) from the town of Dalnegorsk in Primorsky Krai, Russia. The karst cave is located on a limestone cliff and lies about 35 m (115 ft) above the Krivaya River, a tributary of the Rudnaya River, below. Chertovy Vorota provides secure evidence for some of the oldest surviving textiles found in the archaeological record.

== Description ==
The cave consists of a main chamber, measuring around 45 m (148 ft) in length, and several smaller galleries behind it. The site was looted several times before the first archaeological excavations were performed in 1973. Around 600 lithic, osteological and shell artefacts, 700 pottery fragments, and over 700 animal bones were recovered from the site. A 0.6 cm (0.24 in) thick jade disk made from brownish-green jade and measuring 5.2 cm (2 in) in diameter was also recovered from Chertovy Vorota.

The remains of racoon dog, brown bear, Asian black bear, wild boar, badger, red deer, fish and mollusc shells were found inside the cave.

== Diet ==
The occupants of the cave are thought to have been hunter-gatherers, with no evidence of any farming practices. Isotopic analysis shows that the people of Chertovy Vorota likely derived their protein from a mix of terrestrial and maritime sources; around 25% of their dietary protein appears to have been derived from maritime resources, most likely from anadromous salmon. The people of Chertovy Vorota likely hunted terrestrial mammals, collected nuts and fished salmon to provide for their food needs.

== Ancient textiles ==
The remains of carbonized textile fragments were found within the cave, under the remains of a wooden structure that had caught on fire and collapsed. The carbonized remains of rope, nets, and woven fabrics were recovered from the cave. The fibers likely came from Carex sordida, a sedge grass from the family Cyperaceae. The textile remains were directly dated to around 9,400-8,400 BP, the earliest evidence in the archaeological record for textile remains from East Asia. As spindle whorls were not found in the cave, and also rarely found in contemporary East Asian sites, archaeologists postulate that the people at Chertovy Vorota either produced their textiles by hand or through the use of warp-weighted looms.

== Human remains ==
The remains of 7 individuals were discovered within the cave. They were the first individuals to be identified with the specific Ancient Northeast Asian (ANA) gene pool. The skulls of two of the individuals, DevilsGate1 and DevilsGate2, were directly dated to around 5,726-5,622 BC.

=== Archaeogenetics ===
Six out of seven individuals whose remains have been recovered from the cave have been genetically analyzed. Originally, three of the specimens were thought to be adult males, two were thought to be adult females, one was thought to be a sub-adult of about 12–13 years of age, and one was thought to be a juvenile of about 6–7 years of age based on the skeletal morphology of the remains. Results of a genetic analysis on the sub-adult individual have not yet been published. However, two specimens, NEO236 (Skull B, DevilsGate2) and NEO235 (Skull G), who had been presumed to be adult males according to a forensic morphological assessment of their remains, were discovered through genetic analysis to actually be females. The juvenile specimen also has been determined to be female through a genetic analysis. Three of the specimens (including the only adult male plus NEO235/Skull G and another adult female, labeled as Skull Е, DevilsGate1, or NEO240, who has been genetically determined to be a first-degree relative of NEO235/Skull G) have been assigned to mtDNA haplogroup D4m; a previous genetic analysis of one of these adult female specimens determined her mtDNA haplogroup to be D4. Another three specimens (including the juvenile female, the DevilsGate2 specimen, and another adult female; both the juvenile female and the DevilsGate2 specimen have been determined to be first-degree relatives of the other adult female, and the juvenile female and the DevilsGate2 specimen also have been determined to be second-degree relatives of each other) have been assigned to haplogroup D4; a previous genetic analysis of the DevilsGate2 specimen determined her mtDNA haplogroup to be M. The only specimen from the cave who has been confirmed to be male through genetic analysis has been assigned to Y-DNA haplogroup C2b-F6273/Y6704/Y6708, equivalent to C2b-L1373, the northern (Central Asian, Siberian, and indigenous American) branch of haplogroup C2-M217.

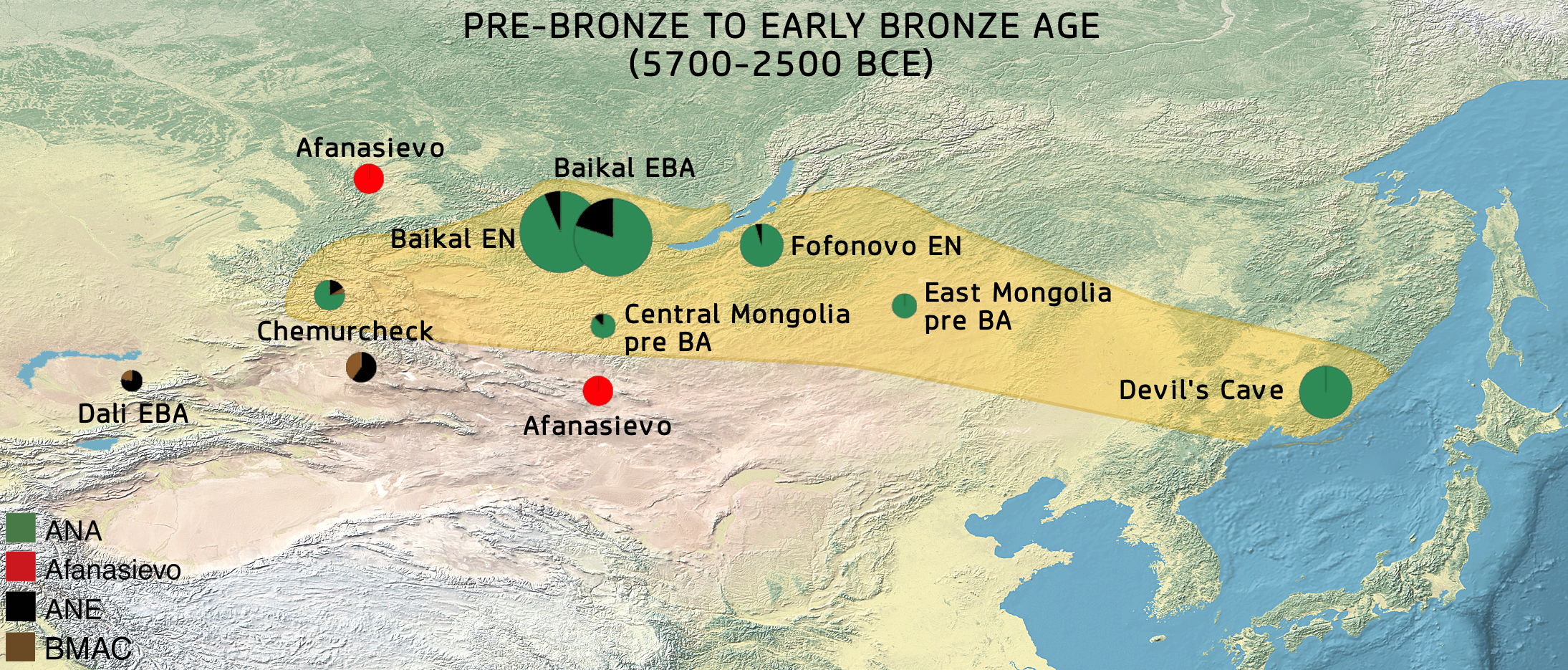
The Ancient Northeast Asians (ANA, yellow area) are defined as a cluster of Neolithic populations from the Altai Mountains to the Devil's Cave on the Pacific coast. Western Eurasian populations to the west combined BMAC, Afanasievo and Ancient North Eurasian (ANE) ancestry.

When compared against all populations on record, ancient or modern, the ancient Chertovy Vorota individuals were found to be genetically closest to the contemporary Ulchi, speakers of a Tungusic language from the lower Amur Basin. The DevilsGate1 and DevilsGate2 specimens were also found to be close to the Hezhen and Oroqen, two other contemporary Tungusic-speaking populations from the basin of the Amur River, as well as contemporary Koreans, Japanese, and Nganasans. When compared against an outgroup from southern Africa (Khomani), outgroup f3 statistics indicate that DevilsGate1 and DevilsGate2 exhibit greatest shared drift with representatives of the same six populations, though in slightly different rank order: DevilsGate1 shares greatest drift with Ulchi followed in order by Oroqen, Hezhen, Korean, Japanese, and Nganasan, whereas DevilsGate2 shares greatest drift with Ulchi followed in order by Nganasan, Hezhen, Korean, Japanese, and Oroqen (cf. Fig. 2). The outgroup f3 statistics also reveal a tendency for the DevilsGate2 specimen to exhibit slightly greater shared drift with contemporary populations than the DevilsGate1 specimen shares with contemporary populations. The ancient Chertovy Vorota individuals are genetically closest to the Ulchi, followed by the Oroqen and Hezhen. The genetic distance from the ancient Chertovy Vorota individuals to the Mal'ta boy is the same as that from modern East Asian populations to the Mal'ta boy. The Devil's Gate population was also genetically indistinguishable from populations such as pre-Bronze Age Eastern Mongolian populations and Amur River populations that are younger than 14,000 years old.

With the exception of DevilsGate1, most of the individuals tested did not yield enough DNA to allow for phenotypic testing of traits. DevilsGate1 did not carry the derived SLC45A2 or SLC24A5 alleles associated with lighter skin color, the derived HERC2 allele associated with blue eyes, the derived LT allele associated with lactase persistence, or the derived ALDH2 allele associated with the alcohol flush reaction. However, the individual likely did carry the derived EDAR allele commonly found in modern East Asian populations, the derived ABCC11 allele associated with dry earwax and reduced body odor commonly found in modern East Asian populations, and the derived ADD1 allele associated with increased risk for hypertension.

According to a 2025 study, when using NEO240 as a representative of Devil's Gate Cave populations, they can be modeled as mixtures of deep lineages that are ancestral to the Jōmon and Tianyuan respectively. This was similarly observed for the Yumin individual, who represents inland Northeast Asians, although NEO240 was more related to the Jōmon.
