= Tasmola culture =

Iron Age culture in central Kazakhstan

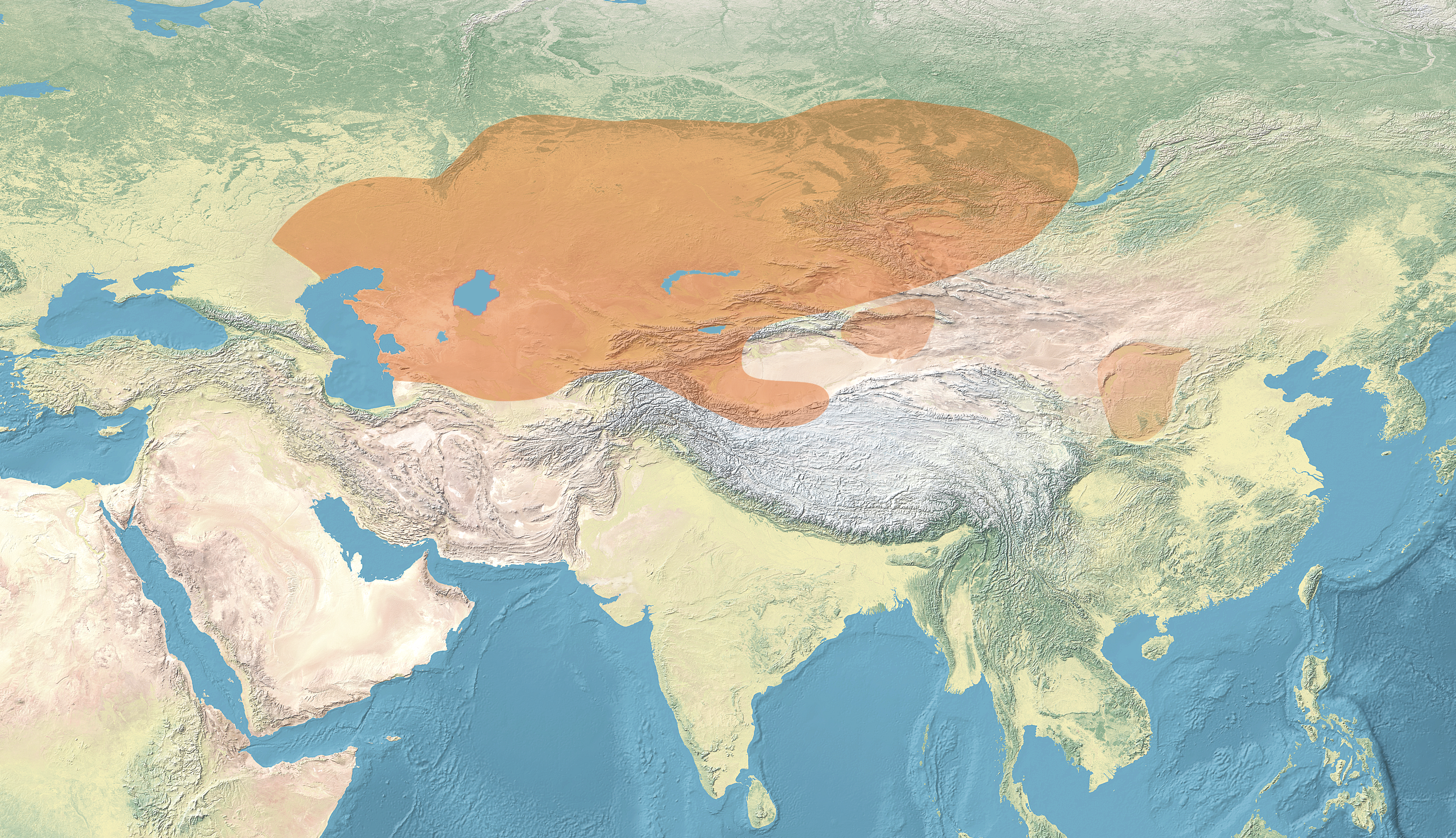
- The Tasmola culture within the Saka realm ( ), and contemporary Asian polities c. -500.
- Geographical range: South Central Siberia
- Period: Iron Age
- Dates: ca. 9th–4th centuries BC
- Preceded by: Begazy–Dandybai culture, Irmen culture
- Followed by: Korgantas culture

The Tasmola culture was an early Iron Age culture during the Saka period (9th to 4th centuries BC) in central Kazakhstan. The Tasmola culture was replaced by the Korgantas culture. They may correspond to the Issedones of ancient Greek sources.

== Burials ==
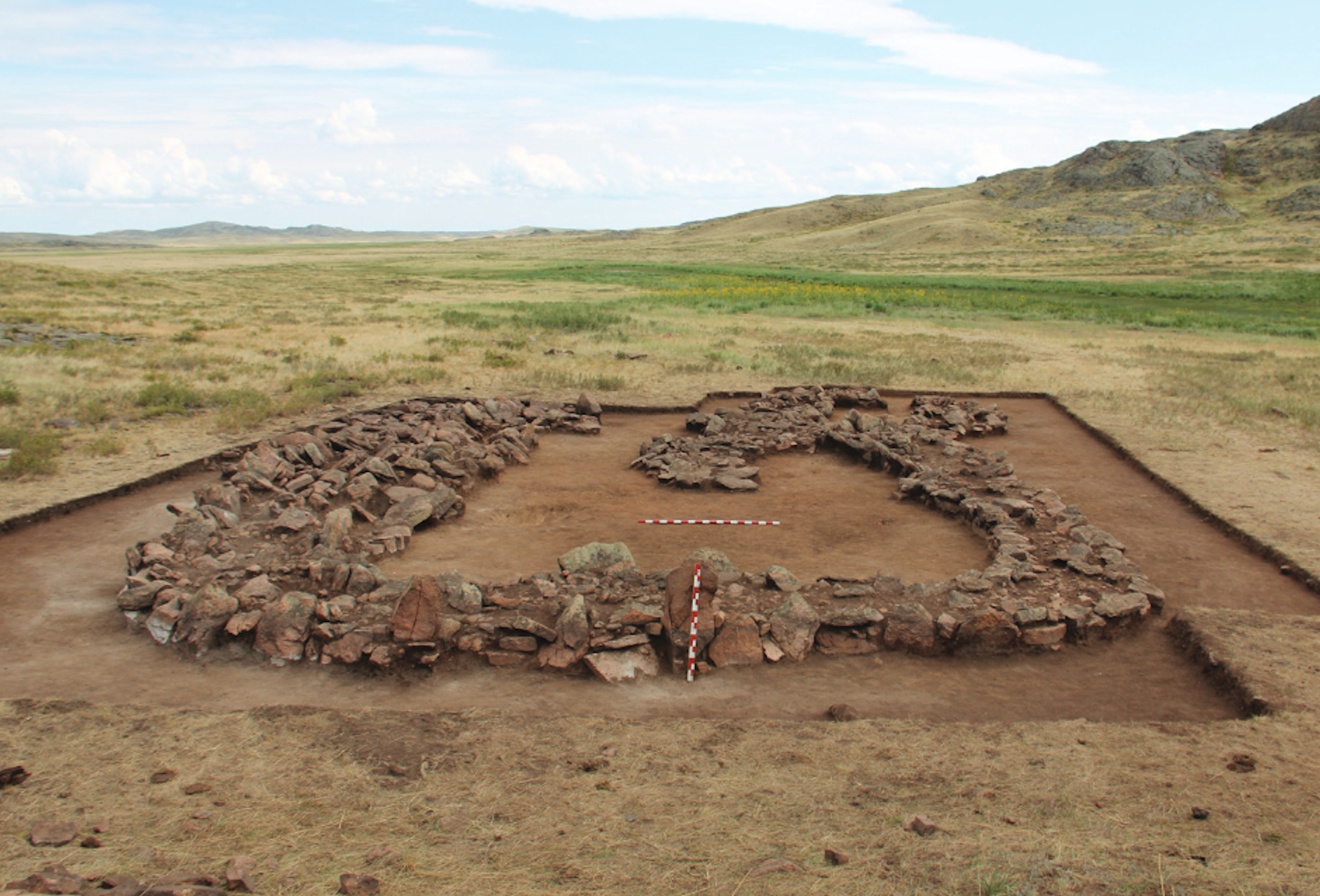
Tasmola housing, village of Tagybaibulak

Everything known about the Tasmola culture originates from the barrows (or kurgans) they built to bury their deceased. The necropoles involve mainly a large barrow and an adjoining small one. Tasmola kurgans were rather large during the early period (30–50m diameter, 3–5m in height), but were smaller in the later period (15–25 m in diameter, 0.5–1.5m in height). They were grouped in cluster of 10 to 15 kurgans. They were often equipped with a central passageway, or dromos, leading to the area of the burial.

Kurgans of the Tasmola culture have been carbon-dated, and range from 894–790 cal BC (kurgan 8 of the Karashoky cemetery) for the earliest, to 509–377 cal BC (kurgan 3 of the Taisoigan cemetery) for the latest. Later kurgans belong to the Korgantas culture.

Circa 600 BCE, groups from the Tasmola culture are thought to have settled in the southern Urals, where they contributed to the development of the Sauromatian culture.

== Finds ==
Characteristic finds are bronze arrowheads, daggers and belt ornaments.
The bronze and golden wares show influences from the preceding Begazy–Dandybai culture.

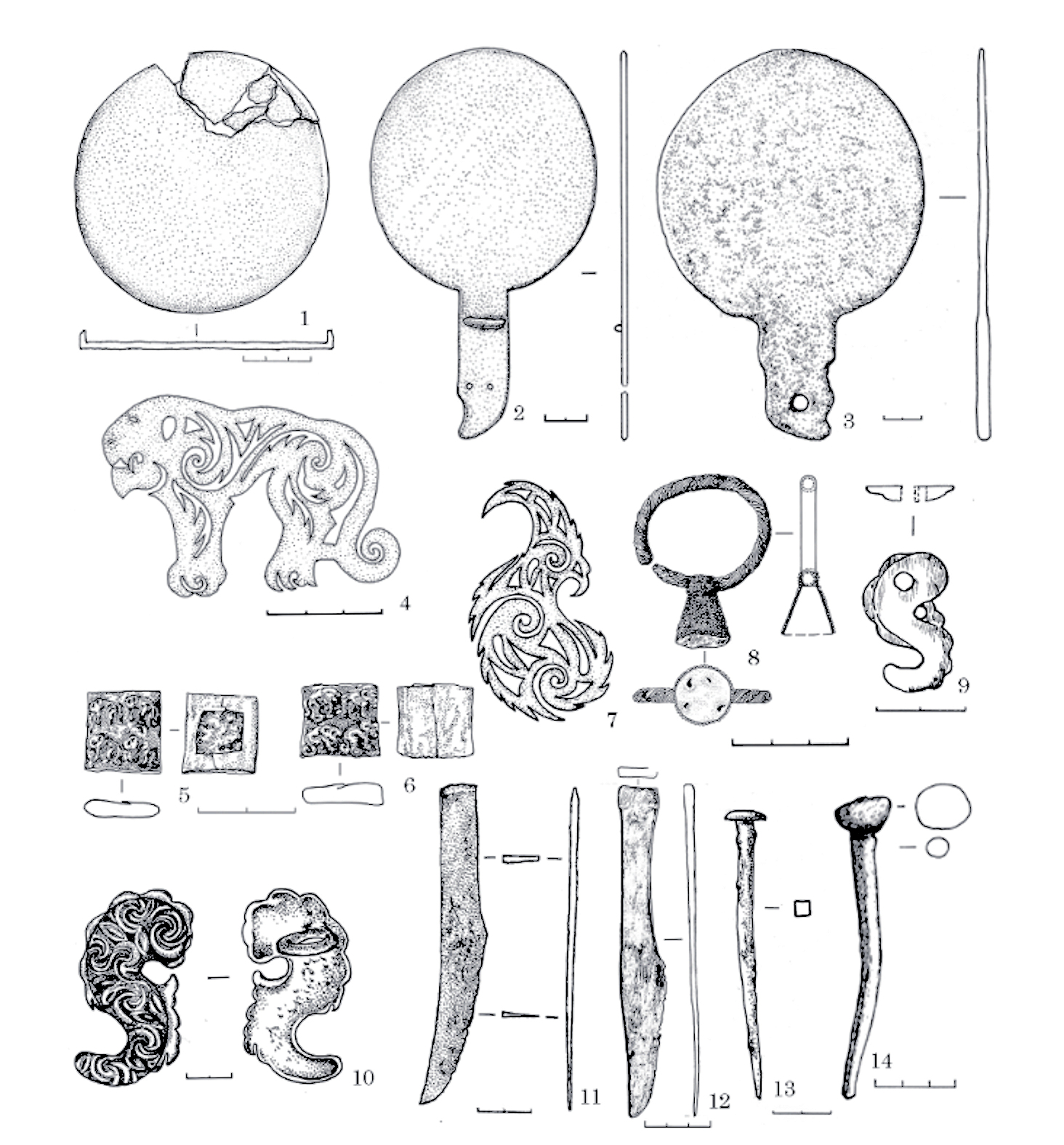
Tasmola culture artifacts

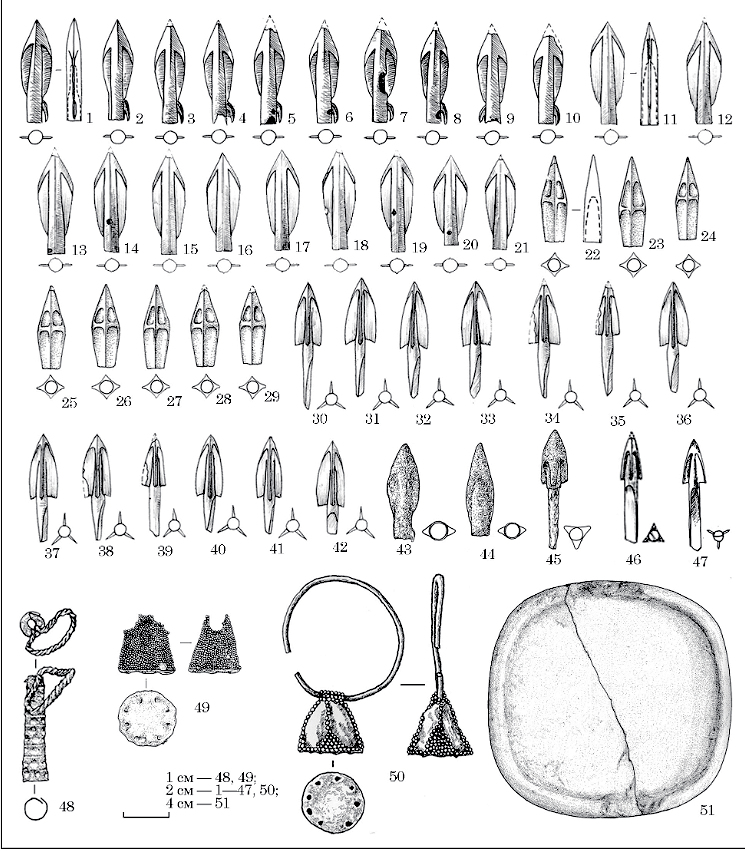
Tasmola culture arrowheads and artifacts

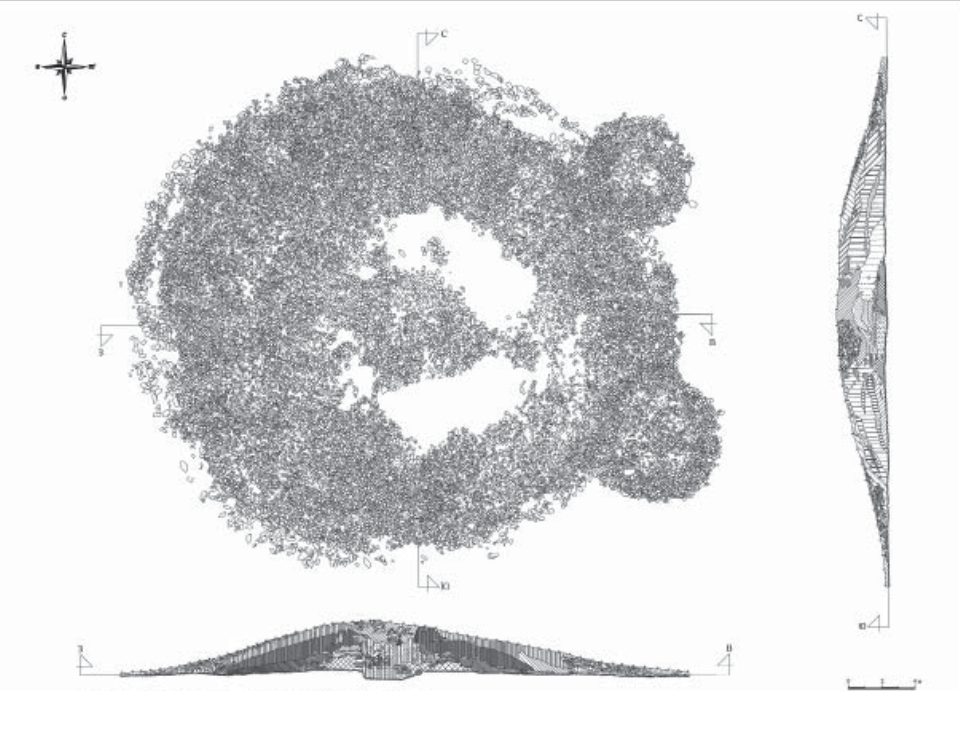
Kurgan, Karatorgay river valley, Kazakhstan, 7th–6th century BCE.

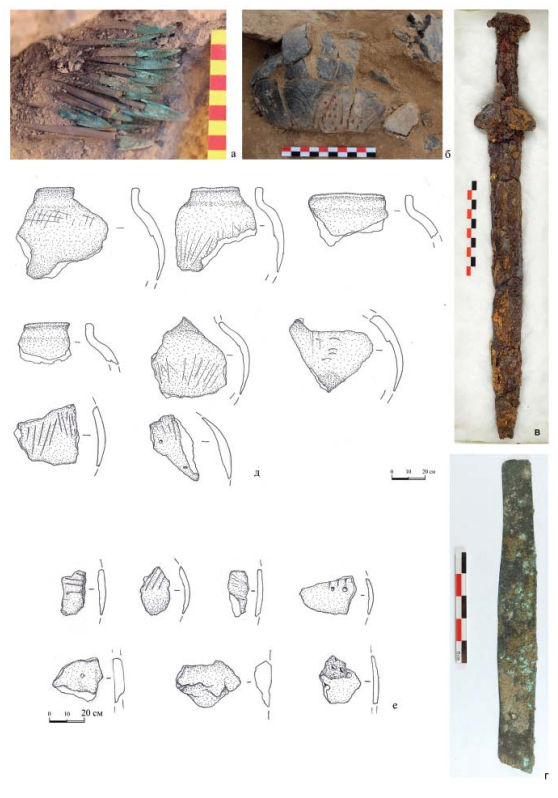
Kurgan, Karatorgay river valley Kazakhstan, 7th–6th century BCE (artifacts).

== Genetics ==
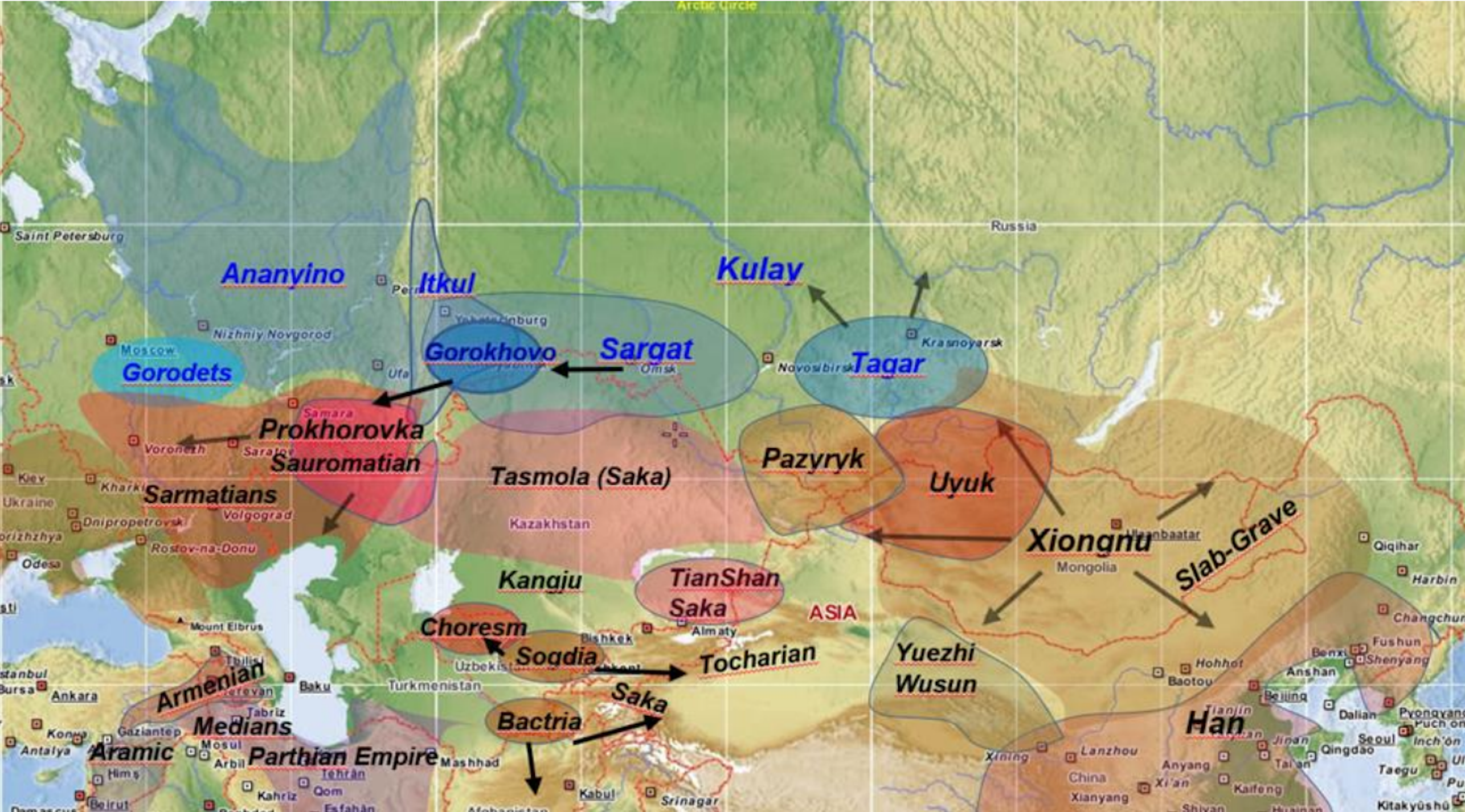
Eurasian archaeological cultures in the Iron Age (ca. 800–100 BCE) with their approximate ranges. Cultures in the Seima-Turbino zone are indicated with blue letters.

A genetic study published in Nature in May 2018 examined the remains of eight Sakas buried on the central steppe between ca. 900 BC and 500 BC, most of whom were ascribed to the Tasmola culture. The three samples of Y-DNA extracted belonged to the haplogroups R1 (two samples) and E. The eight samples of mtDNA extracted belonged to C4a1a, F1b1, A, H101, C4d, U2e, H10 and U7a4. The Sakas of the central steppe were determined to be of about 56% Western Steppe Herder (WSH) ancestry and 44% southern Siberian hunter-gatherer ancestry. They displayed a higher amount of southern Siberian hunter-gatherer admixture than other peoples of the Scythian cultures, including other Sakas. It was suggested that the Sakas of the central steppe were a major source of western Eurasian ancestry among the Xiongnu, and that the Huns emerged through the conquest of Sakas by the Xiongnu. Another study from 2021 modeled them as roughly 50% Khövsgöl LBA, 45% WSH, and 5% BMAC-like, with three outlier sample ("Tasmola Birlik") displaying c. 70% additional Ancient Northeast Asian ancestry represented by the Neolithic Devil's Gate Cave specimen, suggesting them to be recent migrants from further East. The same additional Eastern ancestry is found among the later groups of Huns (Hun Berel 300CE, Hun elite 350CE), and the Karakaba remains (830CE). The study found that the Tasmola Y-chromosome gene pool is dominated by R-M417 and Q-M242 lineages.

== See also ==
- Barrows of Tasmola
- Begazy–Dandybai culture
- Saka
- History of Kazakhstan

== Sources ==
- Damgaard, P. B.; et al. (9 May 2018). "137 ancient human genomes from across the Eurasian steppes". Nature. 557 (7705). Nature Research: 369–373. Bibcode:2018Natur.557..369D. doi:10.1038/s41586-018-0094-2. hdl:1887/3202709. PMID 29743675. S2CID 13670282.
