= Ancient Northeast Asian =

Human archaeogenetic lineage

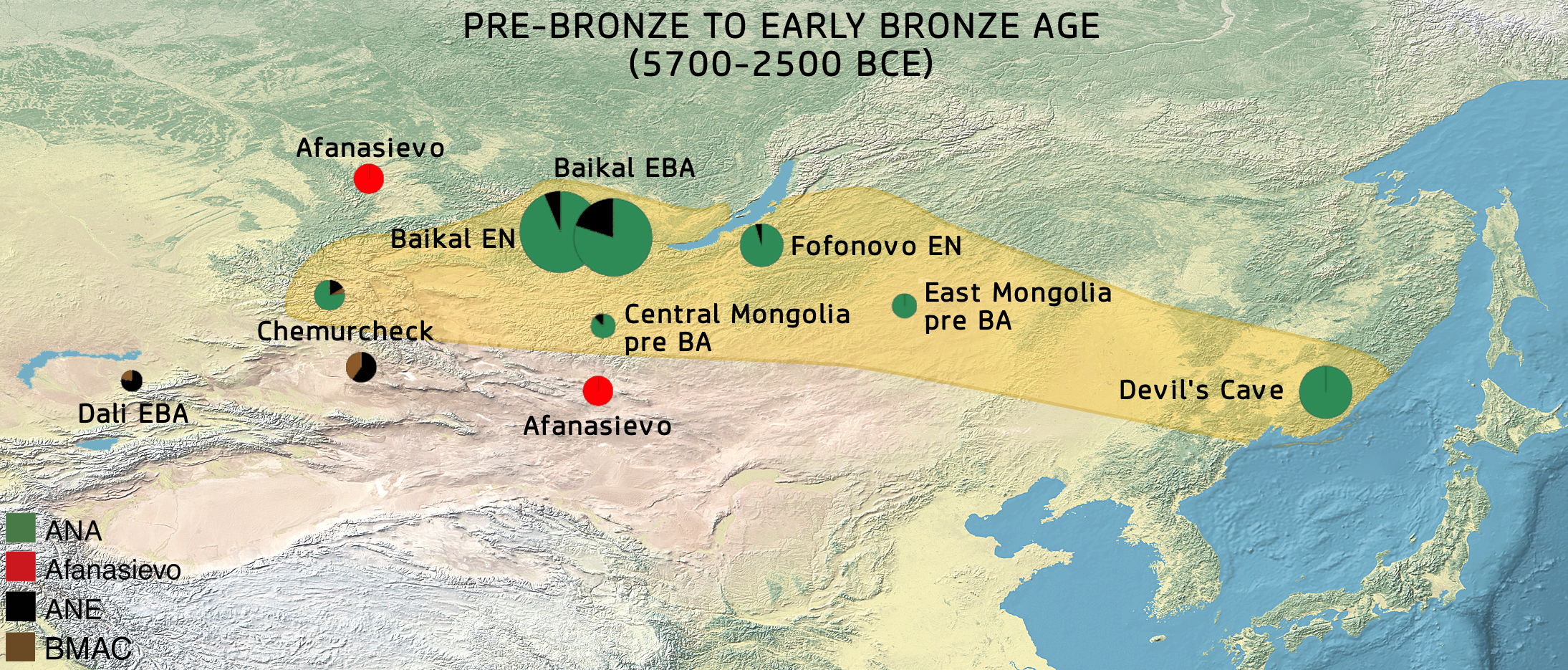
The Ancient Northeast Asians (ANA, green color) are defined as a cluster of Neolithic populations from the Altai Mountains to the Pacific coast. They were bordered by Western Eurasian populations to the west, which combined BMAC, Afanasievo and Ancient North Eurasian (ANE) ancestry.

In archaeogenetics, the term Ancient Northeast Asian (ANA), also known as Amur ancestry, is the name given to an ancestral component that represents the lineage of the hunter-gatherer people of the 7th–4th millennia before present, in far eastern Siberia, Mongolia, and the Baikal regions. They are inferred to have diverged from Ancient East Asians about 24kya ago, and are represented by several ancient human specimens found in archaeological excavations east of the Altai Mountains. They are a sub-group of the Ancient Northern East Asians (ANEA).

ANA ancestry is represented by hunter-gatherer remains from the Amur region, as well as remains found in present-day Mongolia.

== Origins ==
Ancient Northeast Asians, with contemporary cultures c. 3000 BCE

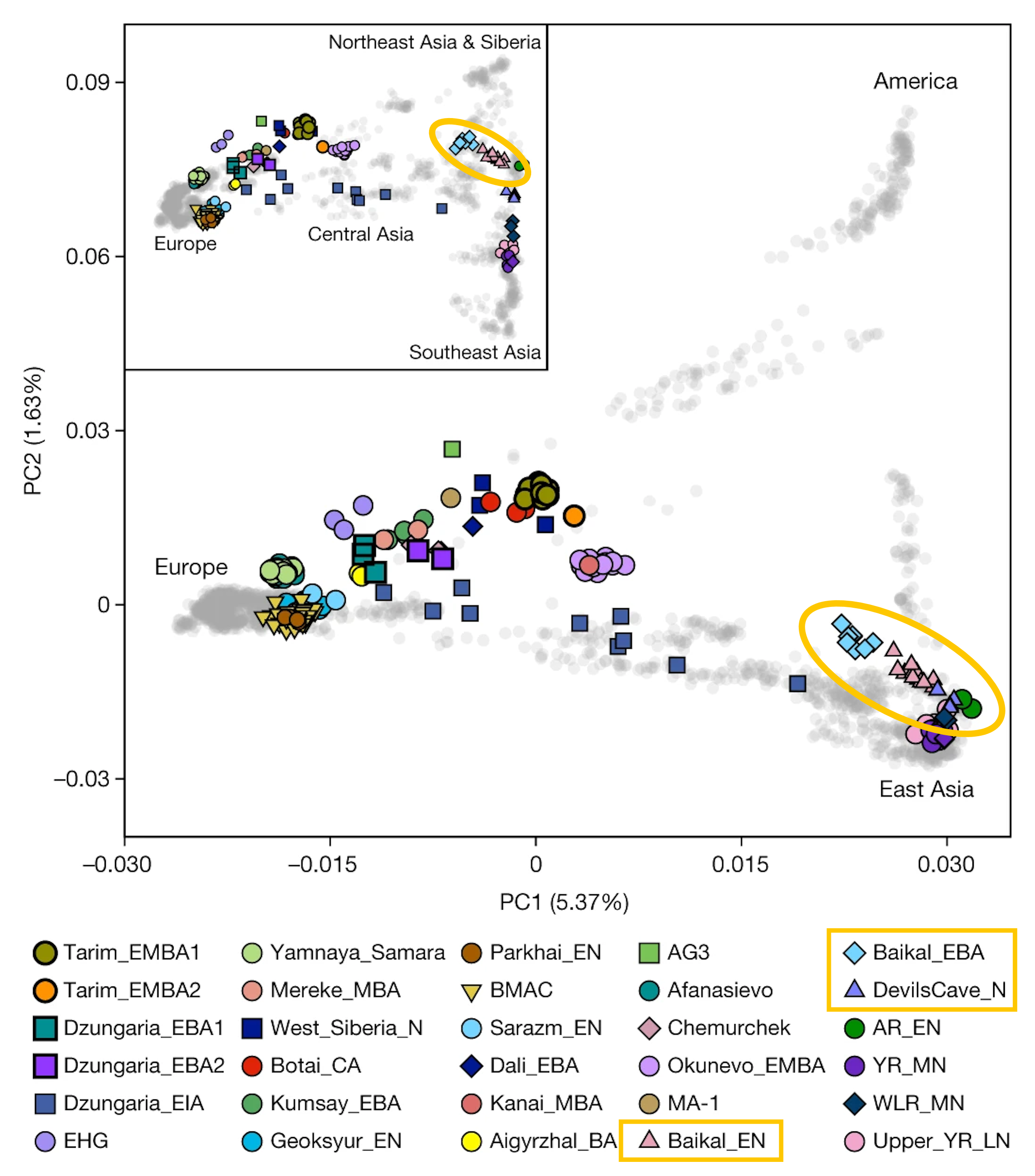
Position of Ancient Northeast Asians ( ) in a principal component analysis (PCA) of non-African modern human genomes (grey), and other ancient populations (colors).

The Paleolithic origins of Ancient Northern East Asians (ANEA) are not well understood, mainly due to the lack of archaeological specimens. So far, the oldest populations for which genomic data have been obtained are the "Basal East Asian" Tianyuan man (c. 39,000 BP), as well as the Amur33K (c. 33,000 BP) samples from Northern China and the Amur region respectively. These Basal East Asian populations are not directly ancestral to later Northern East Asians, but represent a deeply diverged branch, next to the Hoabinhian, Jōmon people, and Longlin/Guangxi ancestries. Ancient Northern East Asians are more related to Ancient Southern East Asians and diverged from them about 26,000 to 19,000 years ago. When and how this type of ancestry replaced the earlier Tianyuan-like ancestry is not known, but ANEA ancestry became dominant in the Amur region at least 19,000 years ago.

To the north and west, Upper Paleolithic Ancient North Eurasians (c. 32,000 to 24,000 BP) in north and central Siberia, were formed by the admixture of Tianyuan-like ancestry (around 1/3) with West Eurasian-related ancestry from Europe (around 2/3). These groups would later interact with ANEA and ANA-rich groups, before getting largely replaced in that region.

There is subsequently a large gap until the Neolithic period, where a specific ANA gene pool has been identified. Ancestry basal to the ANA gene pool, but significantly closer to them than to the Upper Paleolithic Tianyuan-related gene pool or other East Asian lineages (such as Southern East Asians), has been found among a sample in the Amur region (AR19K; c. 19 000 BP), suggesting that Ancient Northern East Asians diverged from other southern East Asian populations sometimes between 19kya and 26kya, with the specific ANA gene pool having emerged from local continuity in the Amur region (represented by the Amur14k specimen).

== Neolithic populations ==
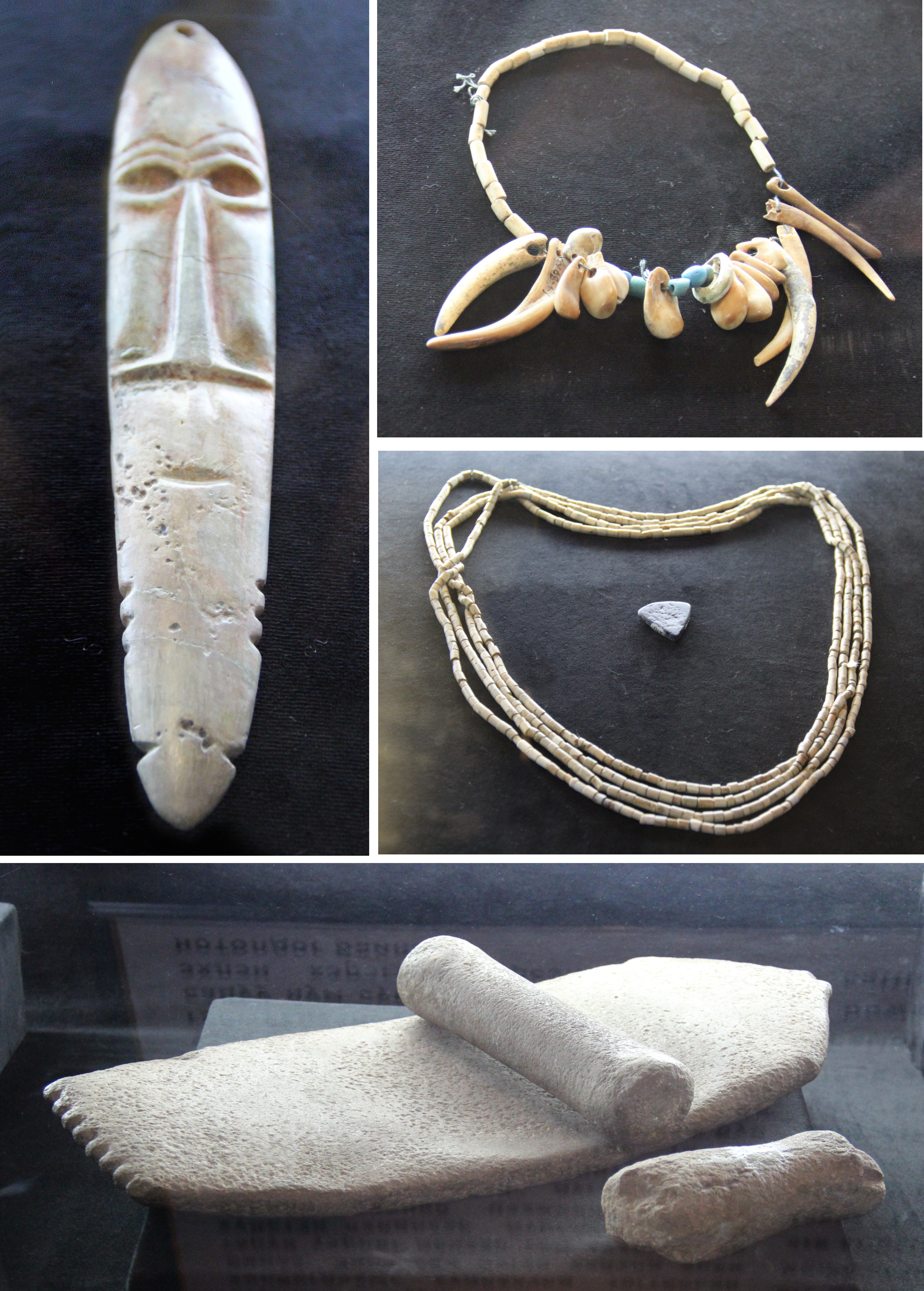
Neolithic artifacts, Eastern Mongolia, 4000-3000 BCE.

The first individual to be identified with the specific ANA gene pool came from the Russian Far East, near the Pacific coast, at the Devil's Gate Cave ("DevilsCave_N", c. 5700 BCE). More Neolithic individuals with the ANA/Amur-like gene pool have been identified in eastern Mongolia (SOU001, "EastMongolia_preBA" 4686–4495 cal. BCE), in central Mongolia (ERM003, "CentralMongolia_preBA" 3781–3639 cal. BCE).

The Devils_Cave_N sample was found to display genetic continuity with a c. 14kya old sample (AR14K) from the Amur region, suggesting that the specific ANA gene pool formed as early as 14,000 BP. Neolithic ANA remains have been found as far as the Altai Mountains, 1,500 km (930 mi) further to the west than previously understood.

The closely related hunter-gatherers from the Baikal region and adjacent regions of Siberia are associated with the Early Neolithic eastern Baikal Fofonovo culture ("Fofonovo_EN"), and the western Baikal Kitoi culture ("Baikal_EN", 5200–4200 BCE or Shamanka_EN), as well as in conjunction with Ancient Paleo-Siberians (APS), the Early Bronze Age Baikal populations associated with the Glazkovo culture ("Baikal_EBA", circa 2500 BCE or Shamanka_EBA) and Cisbaikal_LNBA. They cluster broadly with other ANA populations, but appear slightly differentiated due to genetic drift associated with an earlier inland expansion route and the presence of varying amounts of the ancestral component associated with Ancient North Eurasians (ANE). The proportion of ANE-related ancestry increases significantly over time, rising from a minimum of 14.3% in the Early Neolithic population of the Baikal region to 22.7% in Late Neolithic and Bronze Age populations. The ANE-like component is best explained by groups rich in Ancient Paleo-Siberian (APS) ancestry or, alternatively, by Altai hunter-gatherers formed through admixture between APS and ANE. They also display genetic affinities with the Yumin hunter-gatherers from Northeast China, as well as the Neolithic and Bronze Age groups in Yakutia (Yakutia_LNBA) and Krasnoyarsk (kra001) in the Altai-Sayan region. These populations are sometimes described as "Neo-Siberians" and can be differentiated from proper ANA/Amur populations represented by the Neolithic Devils Cave specimen, but share a common recent origin via their Ancient Northern East Asian ancestor. Neo-Siberians are inferred to have expanded prior to the expansion of Neolithic Amur ancestry.

A 2025 study detected APS ancestry in several ANA populations. For example, Early Neolithic Amur populations can be modeled as a mixture of Amur River ancestry (28.7%) and northern Mongolian Plateau-like (71.3%) ancestry. Ancient individuals from the northern Mongolian Plateau have high affinities with APS populations, with the oldest analyzed individual from the Early Holocene being modeled as a mixture of Early Holocene southeastern Mongolian Plateau ancestry (29.9%), who have more Yumin affinities, Amur River ancestry (47.6%) and APS ancestry (22.5%). About 5,700 years ago, populations from the southeastern Mongolian Plateau mixed with their northern neighbors. Yumin-hunter gatherers and Middle Neolithic Haminmangha (HMMH_MN) individuals can likewise be modeled as a mixture of Early Neolithic Shandongers and West Baikal-related populations, who have high APS affinities.

== Later populations ==
=== Ulaanzuukh and Slab Grave cultures ===
The people of the Ulaanzuukh (1450–1150 BCE) and Slab Grave (1100–300 BCE) cultures were closely associated with the Ancient Northeast Asians (Amur ancestry) and can be modeled as direct descendants of them. They largely replaced the previous Neolithic and Early Bronze Age Baikal hunter-gatherers, although geneflow between them has been proposed, particularly between a Neolithic Eastern Mongolian population (East_Mongolia_preBA) having primarily Amur_N-like ancestry and local Baikal hunter-gatherers (Baikal_EBA).

=== Altai MLBA and Khövsgöl LBA ===
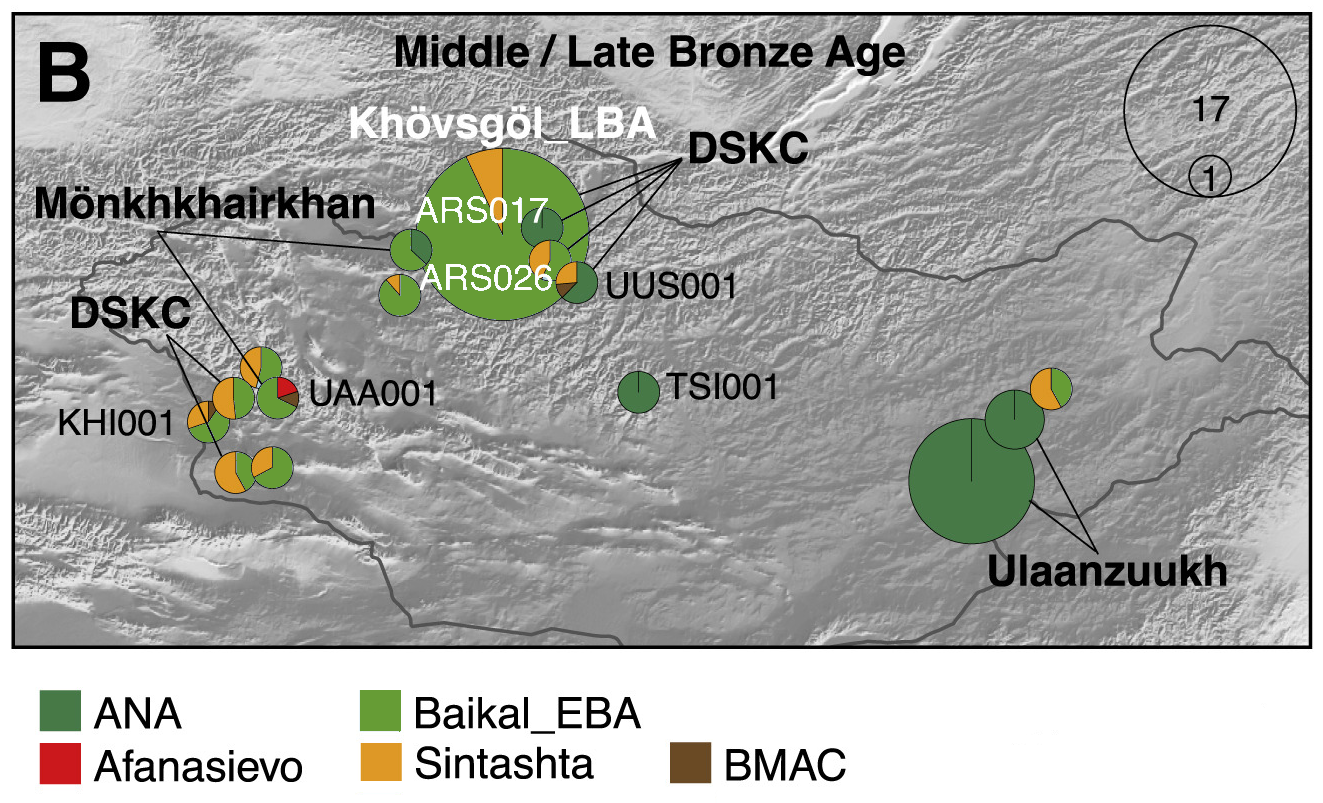
Khövsgöl LBA in the Middle-Late Bronze Age (1400 to 1100 BC) in Mongolia. Khövsgöl LBA is essentially composed of Baikal EBA ancestry (itself essentially Ancient Northeast Asian, ANA , with a small admixture from Ancient North Eurasian), and a relatively small admixture from a Sintashta-like source .

Several successor groups of the Neolithic and Early Bronze Age Baikal hunter-gatherers with varying degrees of Western Steppe Herders/Sintashta-like admixture started to appear in the Altai region during the Late Bronze Age. These groups formed from the Neolithic and Early Bronze Age Baikal populations from the Eastern Steppe and subsequent admixture from Western Steppe Herder migrant groups. This includes the Khövsgöl LBA herders from northern Mongolia and the Altai MLBA hunter-gatherers from the Altai region.

The Khövsgöl LBA herders are descended from Early Bronze Age Baikal hunter-gatherers (Baikal EBA or Shamanka EBA, c. 93–96%) with small amounts of admixture from Western Steppe Herders (Sintashta, c. 4–7%). Genetic analyses revealed that while dairy pastoralism seems to have been adopted by them from the Western Steppe Herders, they were primarily of local Northern East Asian origin, implying cultural transmission. Modern day Tuvans and Nganasans, followed by Nanais, Yukaghirs, Evens, Itelmens, Ulchis, Koryaks, Nivkhs, and Chukchis, are among the people sharing the highest genetic affinities with the Late Bronze Age herders of Khövsgöl, but are not identical to them.

The Altai MLBA gene pool further West can be associated with Eastern Scythians (Saka), who can be modeled as deriving significant amounts of ancestry (c. 40–55%) from the Baikal/Shamanka EBA groups, with the remainder being derived from Sintashta-like admixture (c. 45–60%) associated with early Indo-Iranians.

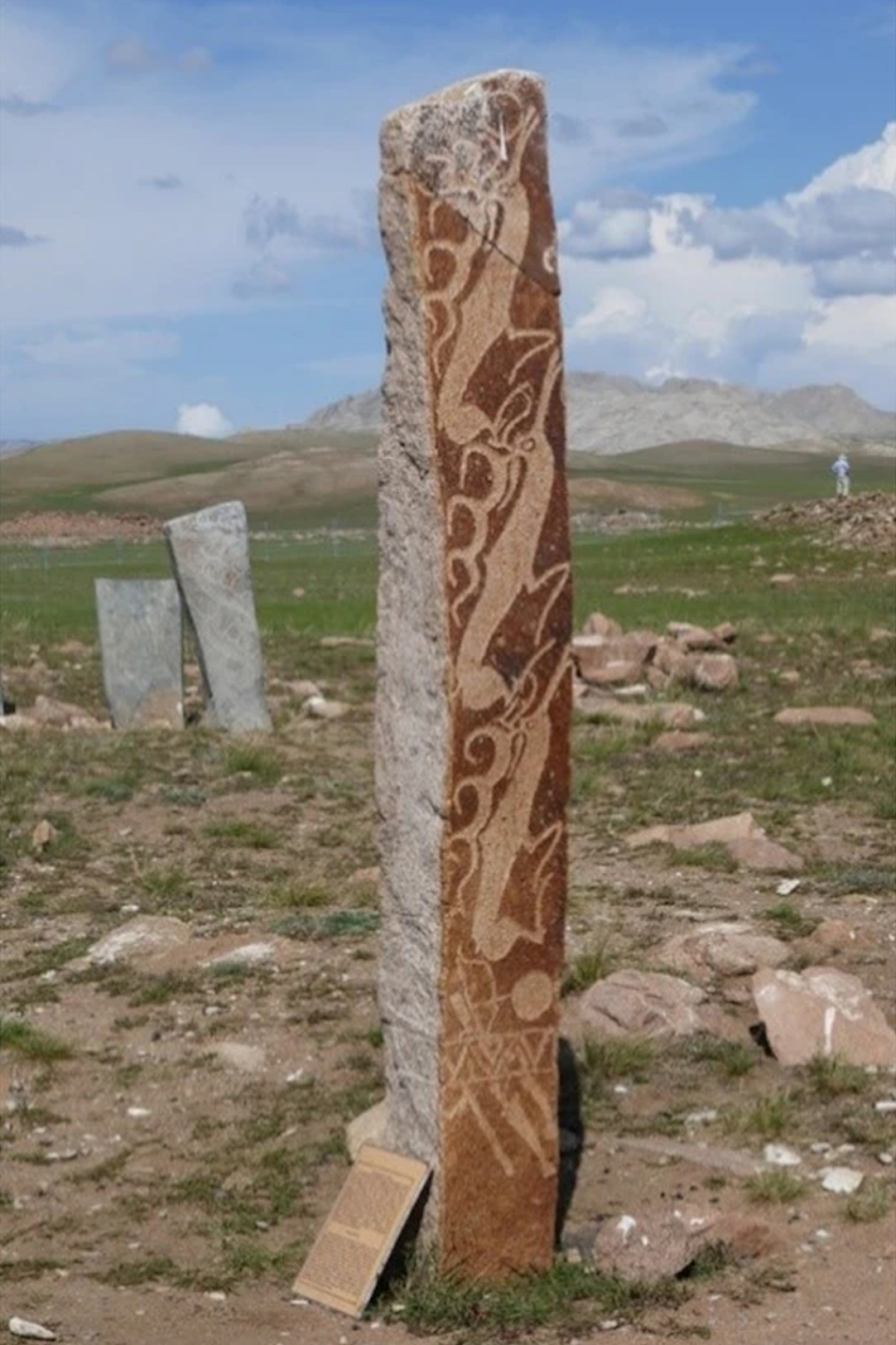
Deer stones are often associated with Khövsgöl LBA burials. Probably c.1400–1000 BCE.

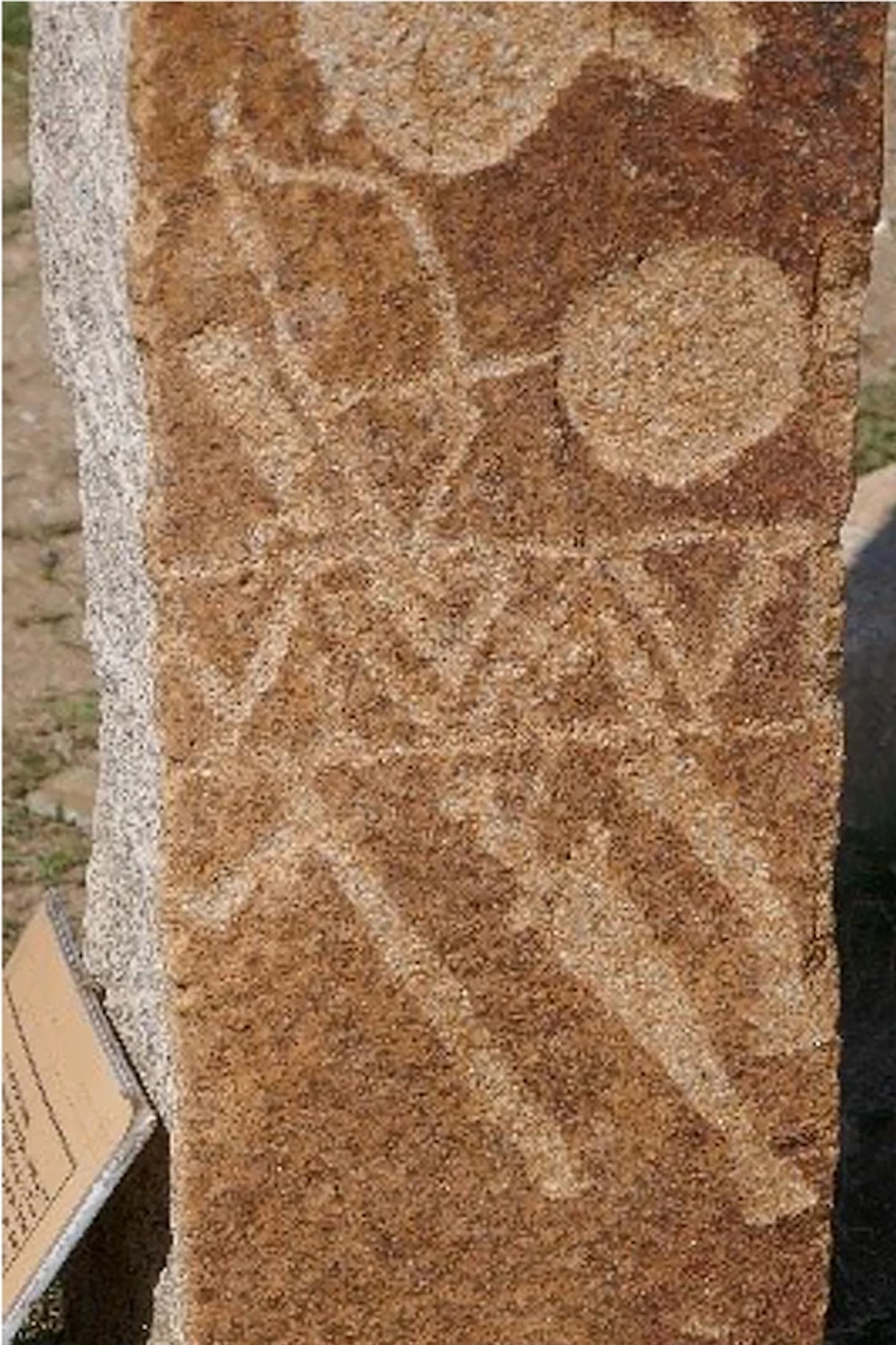
Detail of deer stone, with weapons

=== Tarim mummies ===
A genomic study published in 2021 found that the early Bronze Age Tarim mummies (dating from 2,135 to 1,623 BCE) had high levels of Ancient North Eurasian ancestry (c. 72%), with smaller admixture from Ancient Northeast Asians (particularly the Baikal_EBA, at c. 28%), but no detectable Western Steppe Herder-related ancestry. The demographic make-up of the Tarim Basin evolved from the Late Bronze Age, particularly in the western part: Zhang et al. (2025) investigated a Late Bronze Age site in the far west of the Tarim Basin, dated 1600 to 1400 BC, and found that its inhabitants overwhelmingly descended from the Sintashta and Andronovo population, with additional ancestry from BMAC (10%) and Tarim_EMBA (12%). Nearly all subjects belonged to Y-DNA haplogroup R-M17.

=== Sakas, Xiongnus, Huns, Avars ===
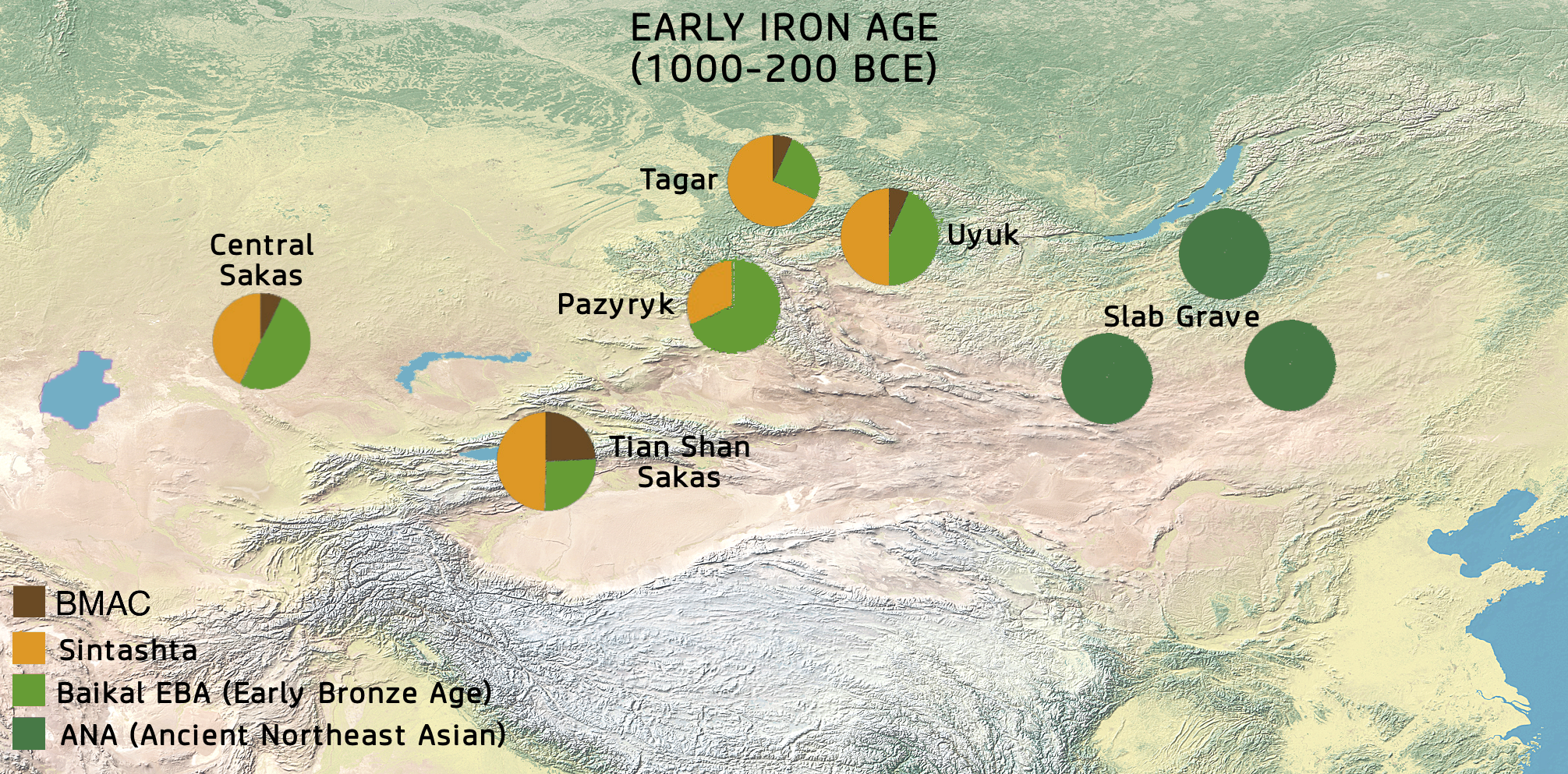
The Slab Grave culture was essentially Ancient Northeast Asian (ANA, ), while the neighbouring Sakas combined in almost equal parts Western Eurasian (Sintashta, ) with Ancient Northeast Asian (Baikal EBA, ) ancestry, with a smaller Iranian contribution (BMAC, ).

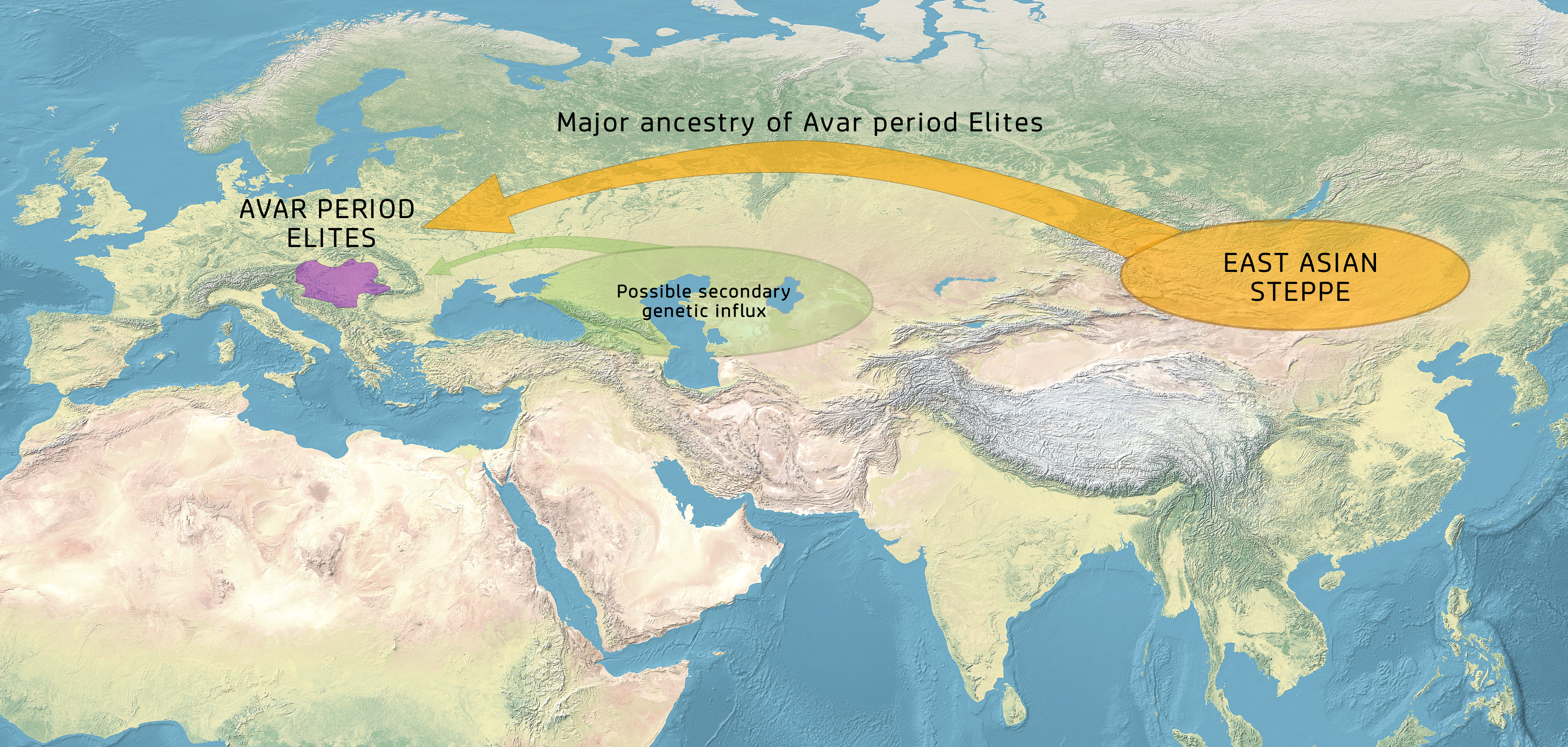
Genomic evidence from human remains shows that the Avars were essentially derived from Ancient Northeast Asians (ANA).

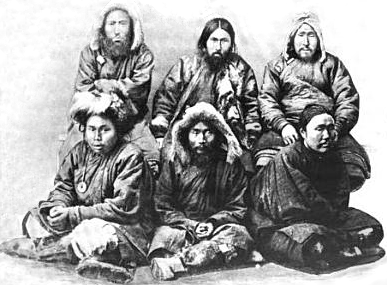
Nivkh people are closely related to Ancient Northeast Asians.

The Baikal EBA populations, also contributed to a large extent to the formation of the hybrid Eurasian Scytho-Siberian cultures, such as the Arzhan and Pazyryk (Eastern Saka) as well as the Tasmola (Central Saka) cultures of Central Asia from around 1000 BCE, contributing about half of their genetic profile (40-55%), highlighting the increase in genetic diversity during the late Bronze Age and the following Iron Age.

The hybrid Saka cultures in turn played an important role in the formation of the Xiongnu Empire (3rd century BCE – 1st century CE), which combined specific Saka ancestries (particularly Chandman/Uyuk-related ones), with Neolithic Amur-derived Ulaanzuukh and Slab Grave ancestries, to which Sarmatian and Han ancestry was further added at a later stage. High status Xiongnu individuals tended to have less genetic diversity, and their ancestry was essentially derived from the Eastern Eurasian Ulaanzuukh/Slab Grave culture, while low status individuals tended to be more diverse and having higher Saka-like ancestry. A likely chanyu, a male ruler of the Empire identified by his prestigious tomb, was shown to have had similar ancestry as a high status female in the "western frontiers", deriving about 39.3% Slab Grave genetic ancestry, 51.9% Han ancestry, with the rest (8.8%) being Saka (Chandman) ancestry.

A Xiongnu remain (GD1-4) analysed in a 2024 study was found to be entirely derived from Ancient Northeast Asians without any West Eurasian-associated ancestry. The sample clustered closely with a Göktürk remain (GD1-1) from the later Turkic period.

A later different Eastern influx is evident in three outlier samples of the Saka Tasmola culture (Tasmola Birlik) and one of the Pazyryk culture (Pazyryk Berel), which displayed c. 70–83% additional Amur-derived ancestry, suggesting them to be recent migrants from further East. The same additional Eastern ancestry is found among the later groups of Huns (Hun Berel 300 CE, Hun elite 350 CE), and the Karakaba remains (830 CE) and may be associated with the westwards expansion of Xiongnu tribes. A Hun individual from an elite burial of the mid-4th century CE in Budapest, Hungary, was reconstructed as 60% Ancient Northeast Asian/Amur (ANA) and 40% Saka.

The 7-8th century Avars in Europe, particularly as regards the Avar elite, were also confirmed to have essentially Ancient Northeast Asian ancestry (c. 90%), with some additions from other sources.

=== Göktürks ===
The Turkic princess Ashina (551–582 CE), whose remains were sequenced, was found to be genetically closely associated with Ancient Northeast Asians (with 97.7% Northeast Asian ancestry, 2.3% West Eurasian ancestry dating back to around 3,000 years ago, and no Chinese ("Yellow River" admixture), which according to Yang et al supports a Northeast Asian origin of the Ashina tribe and the Göktürk Khanate. These findings refute "the western Eurasian origin and multiple origin hypotheses" in favor of an East Asian origin for the Göktürks. The ruling clan of the Turkic peoples, the Ashina tribe, was found to display close genetic affinities with the earlier Slab Grave and Ulaanzuukh culture remains. However, the authors also observed that the population of the "Türkic Empire" as a whole, particularly Central Steppe and Medieval Türks, had a high but variable degree of West Eurasian admixture, suggesting genetic sub-structure within the empire: for example, the ancestry of early medieval Turks was derived from Ancient Northeast Asians for about 62,2% of their genome, while the remaining 37,8% was derived from West Eurasians (BMAC and Afanasievo), with the admixture occurring around the year 500 CE.

Two Türk remains (GD1-1 and GD2-4) excavated from present-day eastern Mongolia analysed in a 2024 paper, were found to display only little to no West Eurasian ancestry. One of the Türk remains (GD1-1) was derived entirely from an Ancient Northeast Asian source (represented by SlabGrave1 or Khovsgol_LBA and Xianbei_Mogushan_IA), while the other Türk remain (GD2-4) displayed an "admixed profile" deriving c. 48−50% ancestry from Ancient Northeast Asians, c. 47% ancestry from an ancestry maximised in Han Chinese (represented by Han_2000BP), and 3−5% ancestry from a West Eurasian source (represented by Sarmatians). The GD2-4 belonged to the paternal haplogroup D-M174. The authors argue that these findings are "providing a new piece of information on this understudied period".

== ANA ancestry today ==
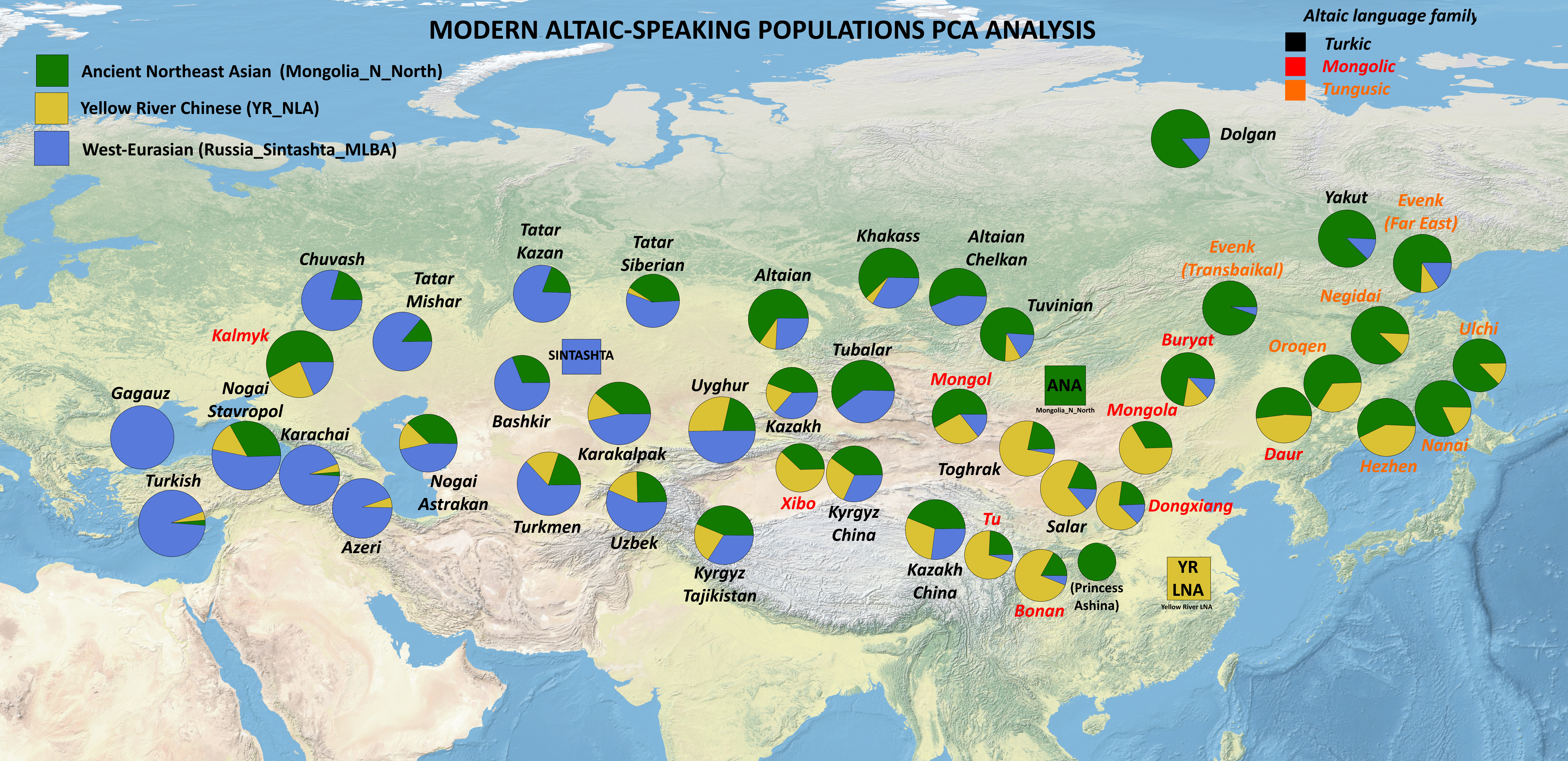
Ancestral composition of modern Altaic‐speaking populations based on supervised admixture, with modeled proportions of Ancient Northeast Asian ancestry (Mongolia_N_North and Ashina, ), as well as Chinese Central Plain millet farmers (YR_LN, ) and West Eurasian‐related ancestry (Russia_Sintashta_MLBA, ).

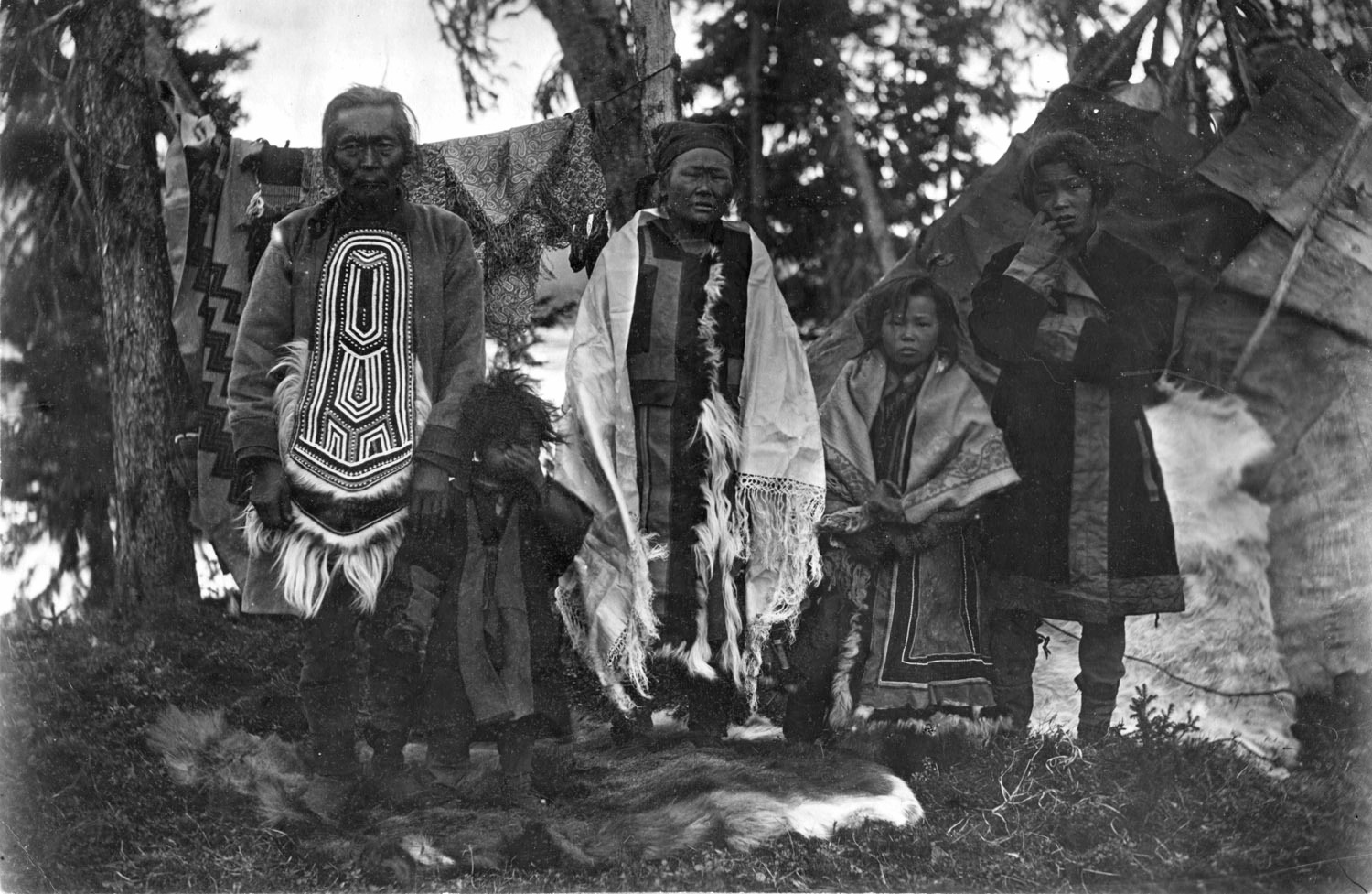
The Transbaikal Evenki people have 95% Ancient Northeast Asian ancestry.

Genetically, ANA/Amur ancestry peaks among modern Tungusic, Mongolic and Nivkh-speaking populations of Northeast Asia. ANA ancestry (represented by the Tungusic-speaking Ulchi people) overall forms the main ancestry of the early and contemporary speakers of Turkic, Mongolic and Tungusic languages, which supports their spread from Northeast Asia westwards, discernable in the Lake Baikal region since at least 6kya. An earlier wave of Northern East Asian ancestry into Siberia is associated with "Neo-Siberians" (represented by Uralic-speaking Nganasans), which may be associated with the expansion of Yukaghir and Uralic languages, and the partial displacement of Paleo-Siberians, starting around 11kya.

Modern day Turkic populations display a high level of genetic heterogeneity, with high proportions of Ashina-related Ancient Northeast Asian ancestry in the East, decreasing westward almost longitudinally to be overtaken by West Eurasian ancestry.

== See also ==
- Afanasievo culture
- Altaic languages
- Chemurchek culture
- Chertovy Vorota Cave
- Korgantas culture
- Lower Xiajiadian culture
- Okhotsk culture
- Okunev culture
- Pazyryk culture
- Tashtyk culture
- Tasmola culture
- Tagar culture
- Upper Xiajiadian culture
- Wusun

== Sources ==
- Jeong, Choongwon; Wang, Ke; Wilkin, Shevan; Taylor, William Timothy Treal; Miller, Bryan K.; Bemmann, Jan H.; Stahl, Raphaela; Chiovelli, Chelsea; Knolle, Florian; Ulziibayar, Sodnom; Khatanbaatar, Dorjpurev; Erdenebaatar, Diimaajav; Erdenebat, Ulambayar; Ochir, Ayudai; Ankhsanaa, Ganbold (12 November 2020). "A Dynamic 6,000-Year Genetic History of Eurasia's Eastern Steppe". Cell. 183 (4): 890–904.e29. Bibcode:2020Cell..183..890J. doi:10.1016/j.cell.2020.10.015. ISSN 0092-8674. PMC 7664836. PMID 33157037.
- Zhang, Fan; Ning, Chao; Scott, Ashley; Fu, Qiaomei; Bjørn, Rasmus; Li, Wenying; Wei, Dong; Wang, Wenjun; Fan, Linyuan; Abuduresule, Idilisi; Hu, Xingjun; Ruan, Qiurong; Niyazi, Alipujiang; Dong, Guanghui; Cao, Peng; Liu, Feng; Dai, Qingyan; Feng, Xiaotian; Yang, Ruowei; Tang, Zihua; Ma, Pengcheng; Li, Chunxiang; Gao, Shizhu; Xu, Yang; Wu, Sihao; Wen, Shaoqing; Zhu, Hong; Zhou, Hui; Robbeets, Martine; Kumar, Vikas; Krause, Johannes; Warinner, Christina; Jeong, Choongwon; Cui, Yinqiu (11 November 2021). "The genomic origins of the Bronze Age Tarim Basin mummies". Nature. 599 (7884): 256–261. Bibcode:2021Natur.599..256Z. doi:10.1038/s41586-021-04052-7. ISSN 1476-4687. PMC 8580821. PMID 34707286.
- Gnecchi-Ruscone, Guido Alberto; Khussainova, Elmira; Kahbatkyzy, Nurzhibek; Musralina, Lyazzat; Spyrou, Maria A.; Bianco, Raffaela A.; Radzeviciute, Rita; Martins, Nuno Filipe Gomes; Freund, Caecilia; Iksan, Olzhas; Garshin, Alexander; Zhaniyazov, Zhassulan; Bekmanov, Bakhytzhan; Kitov, Egor; Samashev, Zainolla; Beisenov, Arman; Berezina, Natalia; Berezin, Yakov; Bíró, András Zsolt; Évinger, Sándor; Bissembaev, Arman; Akhatov, Gaziz; Mamedov, Aslan; Onggaruly, Akhan; Voyakin, Dmitriy; Chotbayev, Aidos; Kariyev, Yeldos; Buzhilova, Alexandra; Djansugurova, Leyla; Jeong, Choongwon; Krause, Johannes (26 March 2021). "Ancient genomic time transect from the Central Asian Steppe unravels the history of the Scythians". Science Advances. 7 (13) eabe4414. Bibcode:2021SciA....7.4414G. doi:10.1126/sciadv.abe4414. ISSN 2375-2548. PMC 7997506. PMID 33771866.
