= Korgantas culture =

Iron Age culture in South Siberia

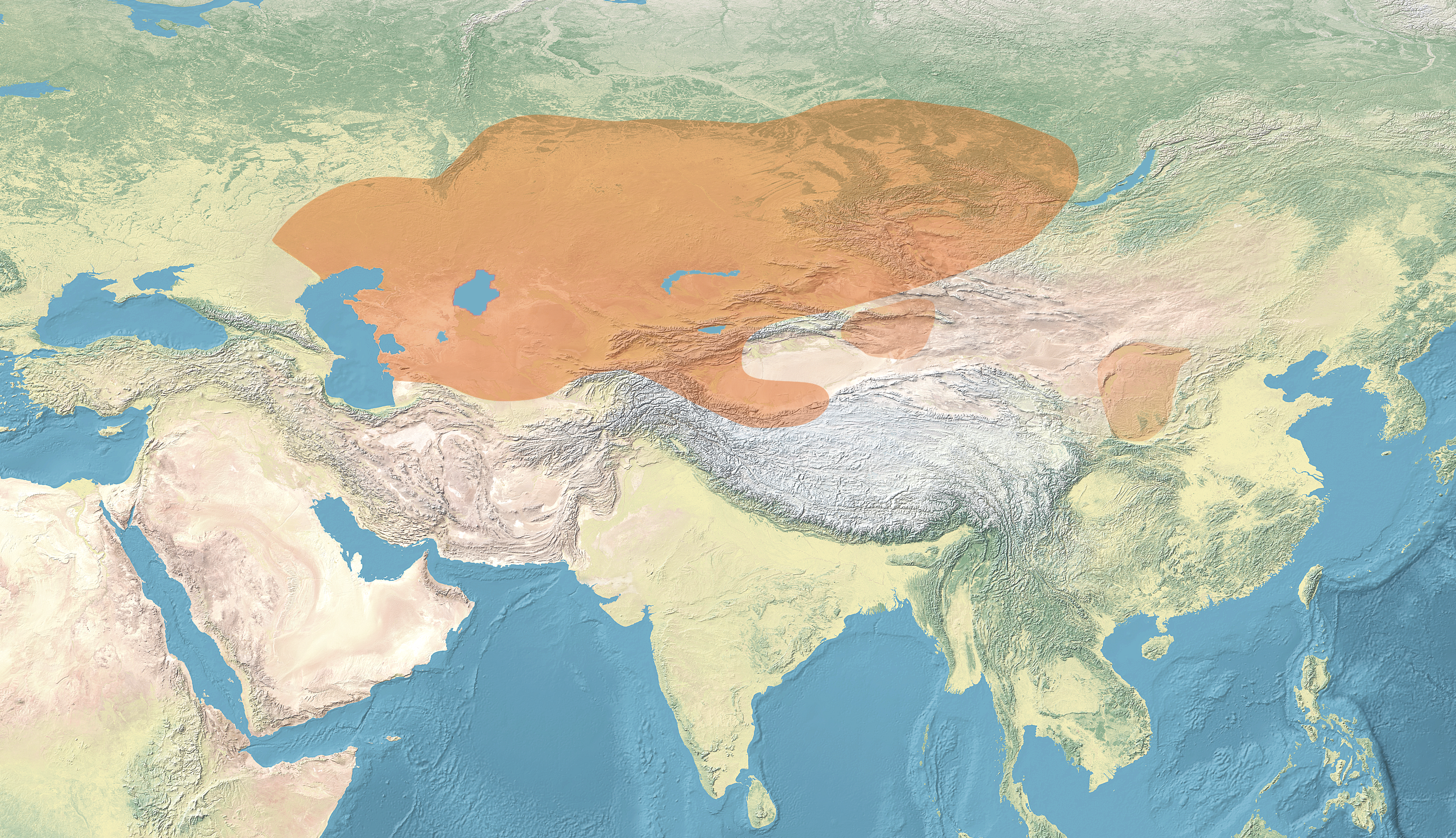
- The Korgantas culture within the Saka realm ( ), and contemporary Asian polities c. -325.
- Geographical range: South Central Siberia
- Period: Iron Age
- Dates: ca. 400–113 BCE
- Preceded by: Tasmola culture
- Followed by: Xiongnu Empire

The Korgantas culture (c. 400-113 BCE) replaced the Tasmola culture in central Kazakhstan. It is sometimes termed as the "Korgantas period" of the Tasmola culture.

The tombs of the Korgantas period differ significantly from those of the earlier Tasmola, lacking dromos passageways, and being smaller, with animal sacrifices arranged near the head. The burials are often covered with a chaotic assemblage of stones, and the dead were oriented to the East or the Northeast. Many characteristics of these burials, especially the heads of sacrificed animals, are similar to those of early Hunnic burials. In a recent study, various Korgantas period graves were carbon-dated to between 400 and circa 100 BCE cal.

Genetically, the Korgantas period seems to mark an influx of Ancient Northeast Asians (Devils_Cave_N profile) in Central Asia. Of four Korgantas individuals analysed in a recent study, three had about 50% Ancient Northeast Asians (Devils_Cave_N) ancestry combined with about 50% Central Saka ancestry (Tasmola_Pazyryk), while only one had a traditional Central Saka profile. The Korgantas people may have resulted from immigrations from the eastern regions of Central Asia, and may have come from the Ordos region of northern China.

The end of the Korgantas period is marked by the expansion of the Xiongnu. The Korgantas period is sometimes presented as the "later Korgantas phase of the early Hun period".

== Sources ==
- Gnecchi-Ruscone, Guido Alberto; Khussainova, Elmira; Kahbatkyzy, Nurzhibek; Musralina, Lyazzat; Spyrou, Maria A.; Bianco, Raffaela A.; Radzeviciute, Rita; Martins, Nuno Filipe Gomes; Freund, Caecilia; Iksan, Olzhas; Garshin, Alexander; Zhaniyazov, Zhassulan; Bekmanov, Bakhytzhan; Kitov, Egor; Samashev, Zainolla; Beisenov, Arman; Berezina, Natalia; Berezin, Yakov; Bíró, András Zsolt; Évinger, Sándor; Bissembaev, Arman; Akhatov, Gaziz; Mamedov, Aslan; Onggaruly, Akhan; Voyakin, Dmitriy; Chotbayev, Aidos; Kariyev, Yeldos; Buzhilova, Alexandra; Djansugurova, Leyla; Jeong, Choongwon; Krause, Johannes (26 March 2021). "Ancient genomic time transect from the Central Asian Steppe unravels the history of the Scythians". Science Advances. 7 (13) eabe4414. Bibcode:2021SciA....7.4414G. doi:10.1126/sciadv.abe4414. ISSN 2375-2548. PMC 7997506. PMID 33771866.
- Beisenov, Arman Z; Svyatko, Svetlana V; Kassenalin, Aibar Е; Zhambulatov, Kairat А; Duisenbai, Daniyar; Reimer, Paula J (March 2016). "First Radiocarbon Chronology for the Early Iron Age Sites of Central Kazakhstan (Tasmola Culture and Korgantas Period)" (PDF). Radiocarbon. 58 (1): 179–191. Bibcode:2016Radcb..58..179B. doi:10.1017/RDC.2015.18. S2CID 130995035.
