= Begazy–Dandybai culture =

Late Bronze Age culture

Begazy-Dandybai culture
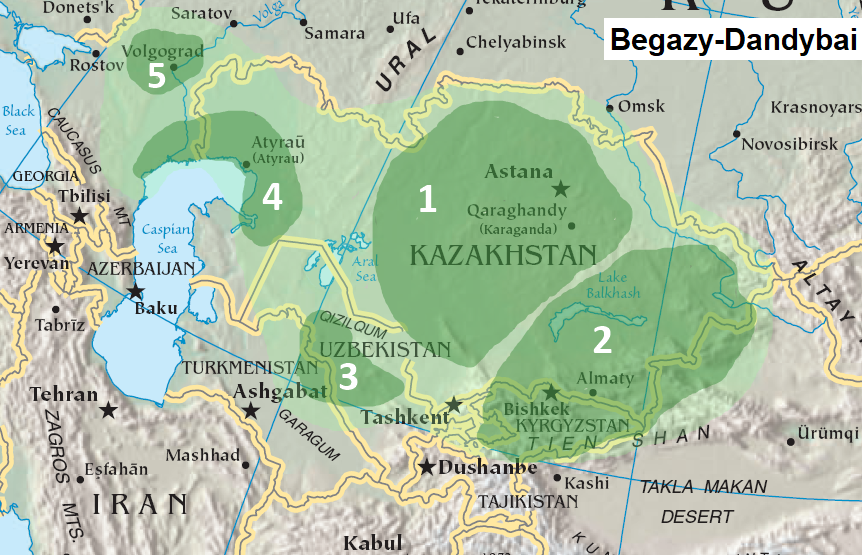
- Geographical range: Kazakhstan, Kyrgyzstan, and Uzbekistan
- Period: Late Bronze Age
- Dates: c. 1500 BC – 1100 BCE
- Preceded by: Andronovo culture
- Followed by: Tasmola culture

Begazy-Dandybai culture (c. 1500-1100 BCE), is a late Bronze Age culture of mixed economy in the territory of ancient central Kazakhstan, Kyrgyzstan, and Uzbekistan, centered at Saryarka region. The Begazy Dandybai Mausolea dates from c. 1350–1150 BCE, and was previously dated between the 12th and 8th centuries BCE, or from 13th to 10th centuries BCE. The culture was discovered, first excavated, and published in the 1930s–1940s by M.P. Gryaznov, who took it for a local version of the Karasuk culture. In 1979 the Begazy-Dandybai culture was described and analyzed in detail in a monograph by A.Kh. Margulan, who systematically reviewed accumulated material and produced description of the archeological culture. The most famous monuments of Begazy-Dandybai culture are Begazy, Dandybai, Aksu Ayuly 2, Akkoytas, and Sangria 1.3, it was named after the first two archeological sites.

Begazy-Dandybai culture is known from the 2nd millennium BCE with mining copper, tin, and gold ore deposits. At that time in steppe oases along small rivers lived fairly numerous Andronovo culture population with farming, pastoral animal husbandry, mining, metallurgy and metal processing economy. Prosperity of Central Kazakhstan Andronov culture was provided by livestock and bronze casting production. A rise of Bronze Age culture falls at the beginning of the 1st millennium BCE, 10th-8th centuries BCE, the highlight of the Begazy-Dandybai archaeological culture. It grew in vast hilly steppe, spread over approximately 2 million square kilometers, with immense pastures and numerous ore deposits.

Archeological research of the post-1980s expanded the known locations of Begazy-Dandybai culture to 60+ settlements and 200+ cemeteries. Archeological attention shifted from fairly well studied megalithic mausolea as main attraction to the settlements and kurgan cemeteries of the commoners. Excavated settlement area amounts to several tens of thousands square meters, burial kurgans of ordinary tribal people have been partially uncovered.

== Kurgan burials ==
Most of the Begazy-Dandybai burials are in kurgans. At present, the kurgan burials of the commoners are known from accompanying inventory. During Begazy-Dandybai era burial began appearing kurgans with single burial. The rich burials testify to income inequality and social stratification. By the same time are dated numerous mengirs.

== Megalithic mausolea ==
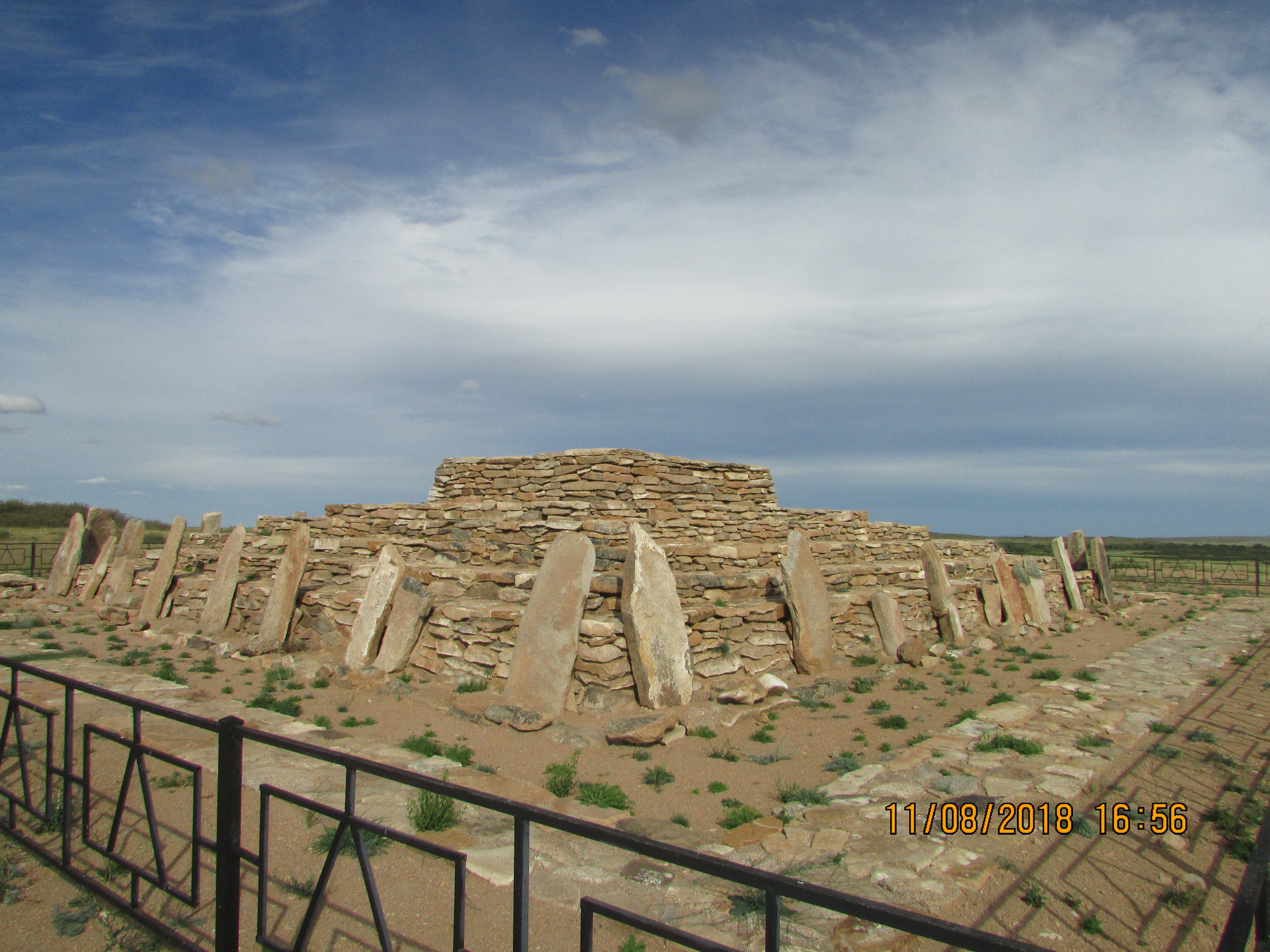
Karazhartas burial ground from afar. Bronze Age in the Shet region 15th century BC

Most visible monuments are about 20 constructively and architecturally unusual megalithic mausolea. As a rule, mausolea are fenced with square or oval layout of two or three stone masonry walls or stone slabs up to 3 tons each encircling a central room and covered by slabs as a perimeter gallery with diameter up to 30 m, and with occasional entrance chamber. The central roof-covered chamber is built with stones and multiple square pillars that support the roof, enclosing a massive sarcophagus. Mausolea are surrounded by ordinary kurgan burials. The cemeteries are close to large settlements extending to 10 ha., with housesbuilt of granite slabs, with pillars and thick walls, connected by corridors.

== Art ==
Begazy-Dandybai culture preserved artifacts of the Bronze Age, and at the same time forms archaeological features of the Early Iron Age. The accompanying burial inventory has richly decorated vessels notable for thin-wall pottery, polished surface, geometric ornamentation, and tamga-type characters on the surface, along with rough ceramics of proto-Tasmola type. The Begazy mausoleum produced tanged bronze arrowheads, which typologically indicated the upper date of the culture, its architecture and housing are notable for their innovations. Pottery, and bronze and golden ware deposited in mausolea found its influence in the succeeding nomadic Tasmola culture. Begazy-Dandybai people produced jewelry: silver and gold bracelets, rings, charms, pendants, earrings, buckles, and diadems (of approximately 86% gold, 13% silver and 1% copper).

== Population ==
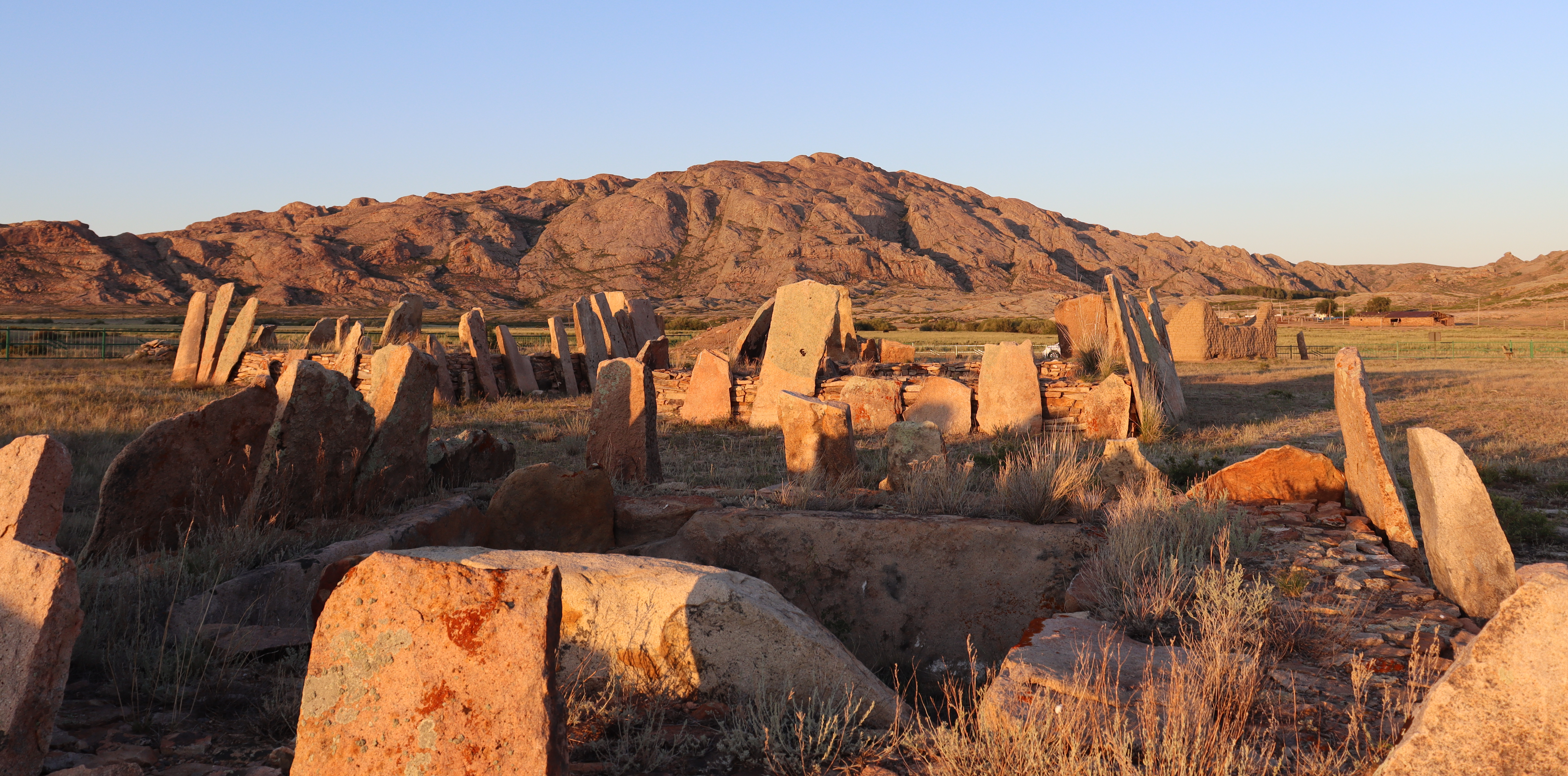
The Begazy Necropolis

Begazy-Dandybai villages were located at the feet of rocky hills, close to plentiful sources of water and fuel. In the Tokraun, Nura, Sary Su, Atasu, Ishim, Selety, and other valleys were densely located villages of ancient miners and metallurgists. Begazy-Dandybai people produced pots, pitchers, bowls, cups, vessels with spouts, etc. Ceramic pots were fired globular jugs with high neck and collar rim. Ceramic was made of clay mixed with granitic sand. Grave inventory and dwellings contain many metal and bone tools: bronze pins, needles, buttons, linings, bone needle boxes, and buttons. Large number of tools was used in mining: hammers, picks, hoes, graters, mortars, pestles, and stone molds.

== Economy ==
Evidence shows developed economy with hoe agriculture, irrigation, animal husbandry, and non ferrous metals production. It is thought that in the Late Bronze Age (20th — 8th centuries BCE) arose nomadic pastoralism of yaylaj type (distant summer pastures), which led to increase in livestock productivity, with grows of livestock herds. The population continued irrigation farming.

== Related cultures ==
The Begazy-Dandibay culture and main contemporary polities in continental Asia.

The Andronovo culture is held to be a predecessor of the Begazy-Dandybai culture, among others.

Begazy-Dandybai sites, usually located in mountainous areas surrounded by dry steppes, were succeeded in the same territory by pastoralist nomadic cultures. These included the:

- Tasmola culture, which was dispersed throughout central Kazakhstan in the Karaganda, Akmola, and Pavlodar provinces, and;
- Pazyryk culture of the Altay Mountains.

While the megalithic architecture of Begazy-Dandybai was unique, other aspects of its material culture were similar to the contemporaneous Karasuk culture and to that of Tasmola.

In the absence of further evidence, there is no consensus on the historic identity, cultural connections or genetics of the Begazy-Dandybai culture. Scholarly opinions are divided between theories of a predominantly indigenous origin and a predominantly external origin. The ancient tribes of the Kazakhstan Bronze Age were descendants of the Kazakhstan Neolithic population, and became ancestors of the Sakas, Wusun, and Kangju tribes.

== Literature ==
- Margulan A.H., Begazy-Dandybaevskaya Kultura Tsentralnogo Kazakhstana, Alma-Ata: Akademiya nauk Kazahskoj SSR, 1979.
