= ADD1 =

Protein-coding gene in the species Homo sapiens

Identifiers
- Aliases: ADD1, ADDA, adducin 1
- External IDs: OMIM: 102680; MGI: 87918; GeneCards: ADD1

Gene location (Human)
Chr.	Chromosome 4 (human)
Band	4p16.3	Start	2,843,844 bp
Band	4p16.3	End	2,930,076 bp

Gene location (Mouse)
Chr.	Chromosome 5 (mouse)
Band	5 B2|5 17.9 cM	Start	34,731,008 bp
Band	5 B2|5 17.9 cM	End	34,789,652 bp
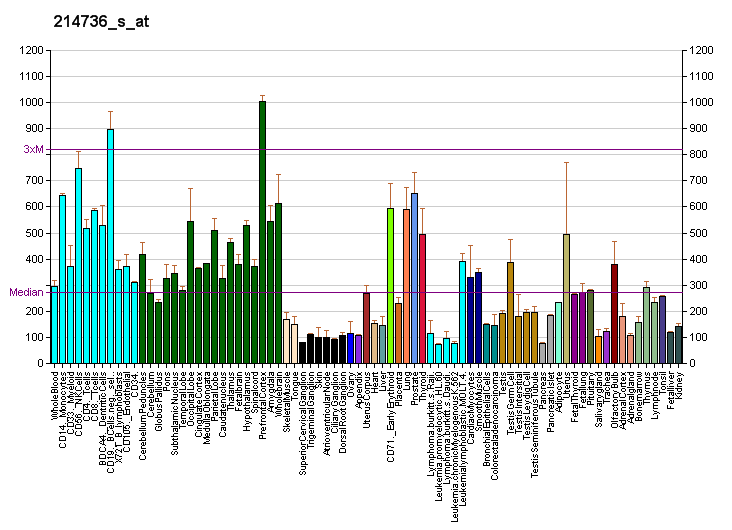

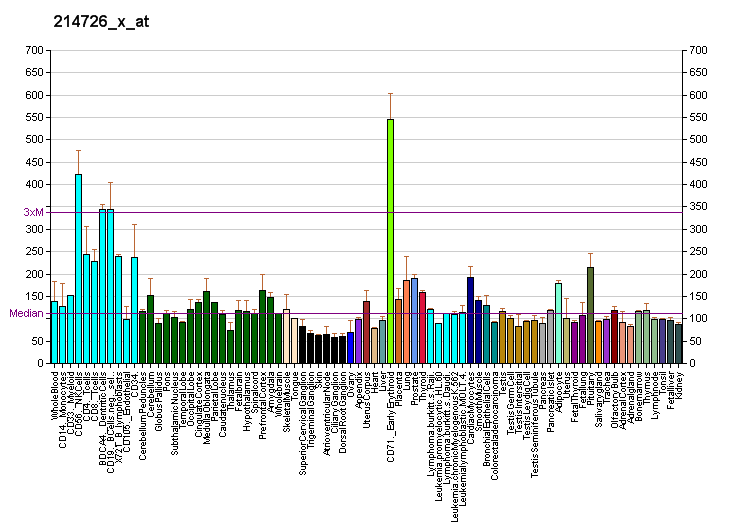

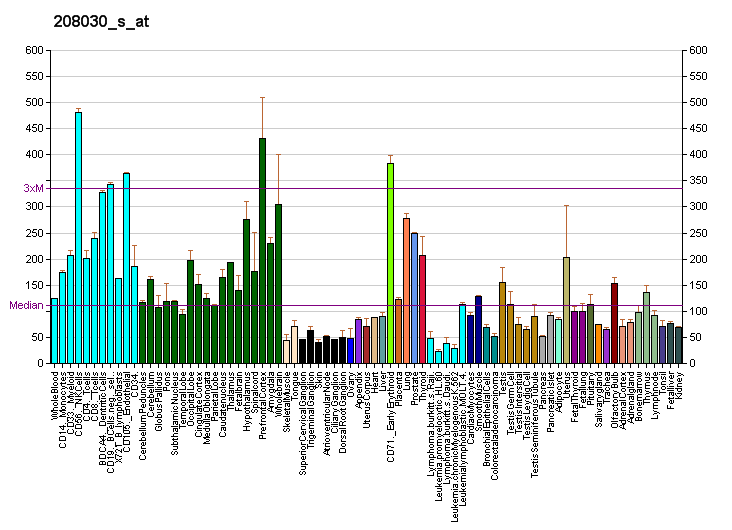
RNA expression pattern
Bgee	Human / Mouse (ortholog); Top expressed in: right hemisphere of cerebellum; tibial nerve; right frontal lobe; body of uterus; right ovary; left ovary; muscle layer of sigmoid colon; sural nerve; putamen; right lung / Top expressed in: neural layer of retina; dentate gyrus of hippocampal formation granule cell; superior frontal gyrus; external carotid artery; internal carotid artery; primary visual cortex; genital tubercle; tail of embryo; fetal liver hematopoietic progenitor cell; granulocyte; More reference expression data
BioGPS	More reference expression data
Gene ontology
Molecular function	spectrin binding; protein homodimerization activity; transcription factor binding; structural molecule activity; calmodulin binding; actin filament binding; protein binding; protein heterodimerization activity; actin binding; RNA binding; cadherin binding
Cellular component	F-actin capping protein complex; cytosol; membrane; focal adhesion; plasma membrane; nucleoplasm; cytoskeleton; nucleus; nuclear body; cytoplasm; postsynaptic density; plasma membrane raft
Biological process	cell volume homeostasis; multicellular organism growth; barbed-end actin filament capping; in utero embryonic development; actin filament bundle assembly; IRE1-mediated unfolded protein response; transmembrane transport; cell morphogenesis; erythrocyte differentiation; homeostasis of number of cells within a tissue; positive regulation of protein binding; actin cytoskeleton organization; hemoglobin metabolic process; cellular response to calcium ion; positive regulation of establishment of endothelial barrier; positive regulation of adherens junction organization
Sources:Amigo / QuickGO
Orthologs
Databases	NCBI: entry; OMA: entry
Species	Human	Mouse
Entrez	118	11518
Ensembl	ENSG00000087274	ENSMUSG00000029106
UniProt	P35611	Q9QYC0
RefSeq (mRNA)	NM_001119; NM_001286645; NM_014189; NM_014190; NM_176801 NM_001354754; NM_001354755; NM_001354756; NM_001354757; NM_001354759; NM_001354761; NM_001354762; NM_001354758	NM_001024458; NM_001102444; NM_013457; NM_001331080; NM_001331081 NM_001331082; NM_001331083; NM_001331084; NM_001331085; NM_001331086; NM_001331087
RefSeq (protein)	NP_001110; NP_001273574; NP_054908; NP_054909; NP_789771 NP_001341683; NP_001341684; NP_001341685; NP_001341686; NP_001341688; NP_001341690; NP_001341691; NP_001341687	NP_001019629; NP_001095914; NP_001318009; NP_001318010; NP_001318011 NP_001318012; NP_001318013; NP_001318014; NP_001318015; NP_001318016; NP_038485
Location (UCSC)	Chr 4: 2.84 – 2.93 Mb	Chr 5: 34.73 – 34.79 Mb
PubMed search
- Wikidata
View/Edit Human	View/Edit Mouse

Alpha-adducin is a protein that in humans is encoded by the ADD1 gene.

Adducins are a family of cytoskeleton proteins encoded by three genes (alpha, beta, gamma). Adducin is a heterodimeric protein that consists of related subunits, which are produced from distinct genes but share a similar structure. Alpha- and beta-adducin include a protease-resistant N-terminal region and a protease-sensitive, hydrophilic C-terminal region. Alpha- and gamma-adducins are ubiquitously expressed. In contrast, beta-adducin is expressed at high levels in brain and hematopoietic tissues. Adducin binds with high affinity to Ca(2+)/calmodulin and is a substrate for protein kinases A and C. Alternative splicing results in multiple variants encoding distinct isoforms; however, not all variants have been fully described. Polymorphism in ADD1 is associated with hypertension.
