= Barrows of Tasmola =

The Barrows (or Tumuli) of Tasmola are dispersed throughout central Kazakhstan in the Karaganda, Akmola, and Pavlodar regions.

== Site description ==
Originating in the Saka period (7th to 3rd Centuries BC), the various barrows of the Tasmola culture can be found throughout the valleys of central Kazakhstan. The sites are characterized by stone complexes with up to four stone barrows, menhirs (single or in groups), and two curved ranges that can each stretch 50 to 200 m long (unique to Tasmola structures). The ranges appear to line up in accordance to equinoctial, solstitial or midsummer sunrise points. Archaeological finds in the barrows themselves can include pottery, horse skeletons, and fire pit remains. Over 300 of such barrows have been identified in Kazakhstan, of which only a small number have been archaeologically excavated.

The last characteristic Tasmola kurgans seem to date to the 5th–4th century BCE.

== World Heritage Status ==
This site was added to the UNESCO World Heritage Tentative List on September 24, 1998 in the Mixed (Cultural + Natural) category. (see List of World Heritage Sites in Kazakhstan)

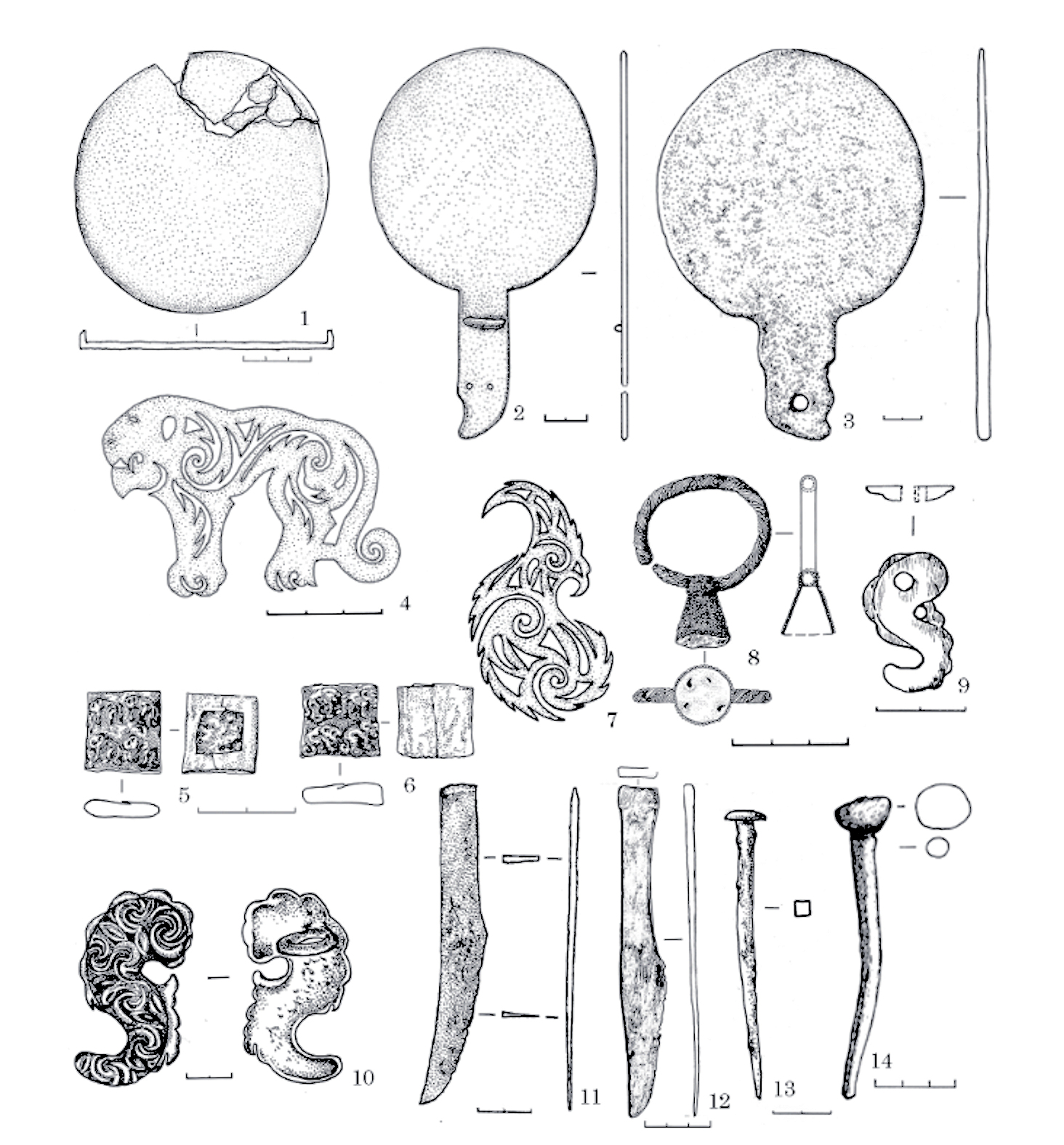
Tasmola culture artifacts

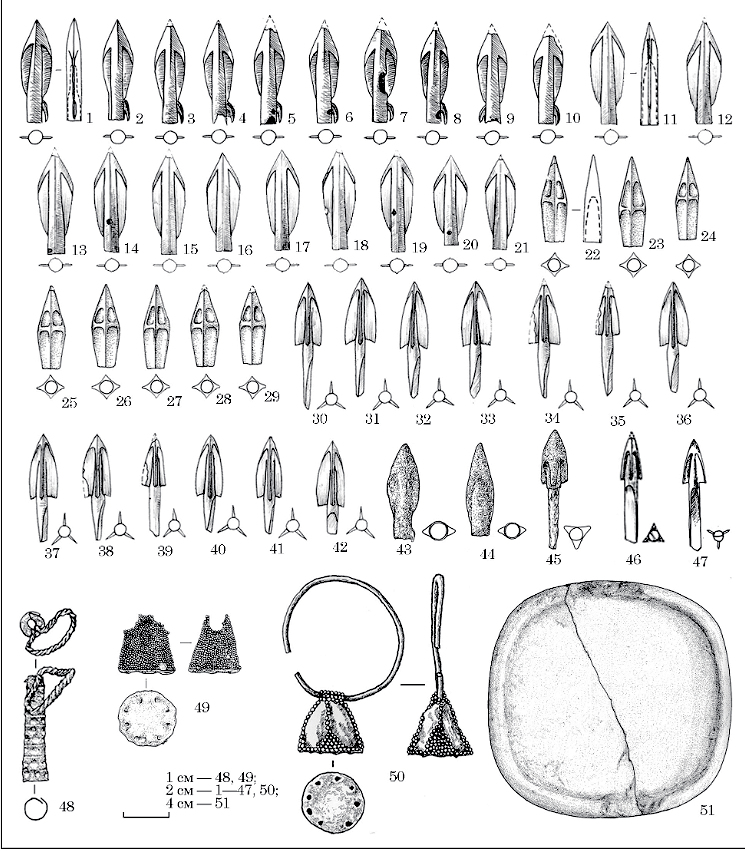
Tasmola culture arrowheads and artifacts

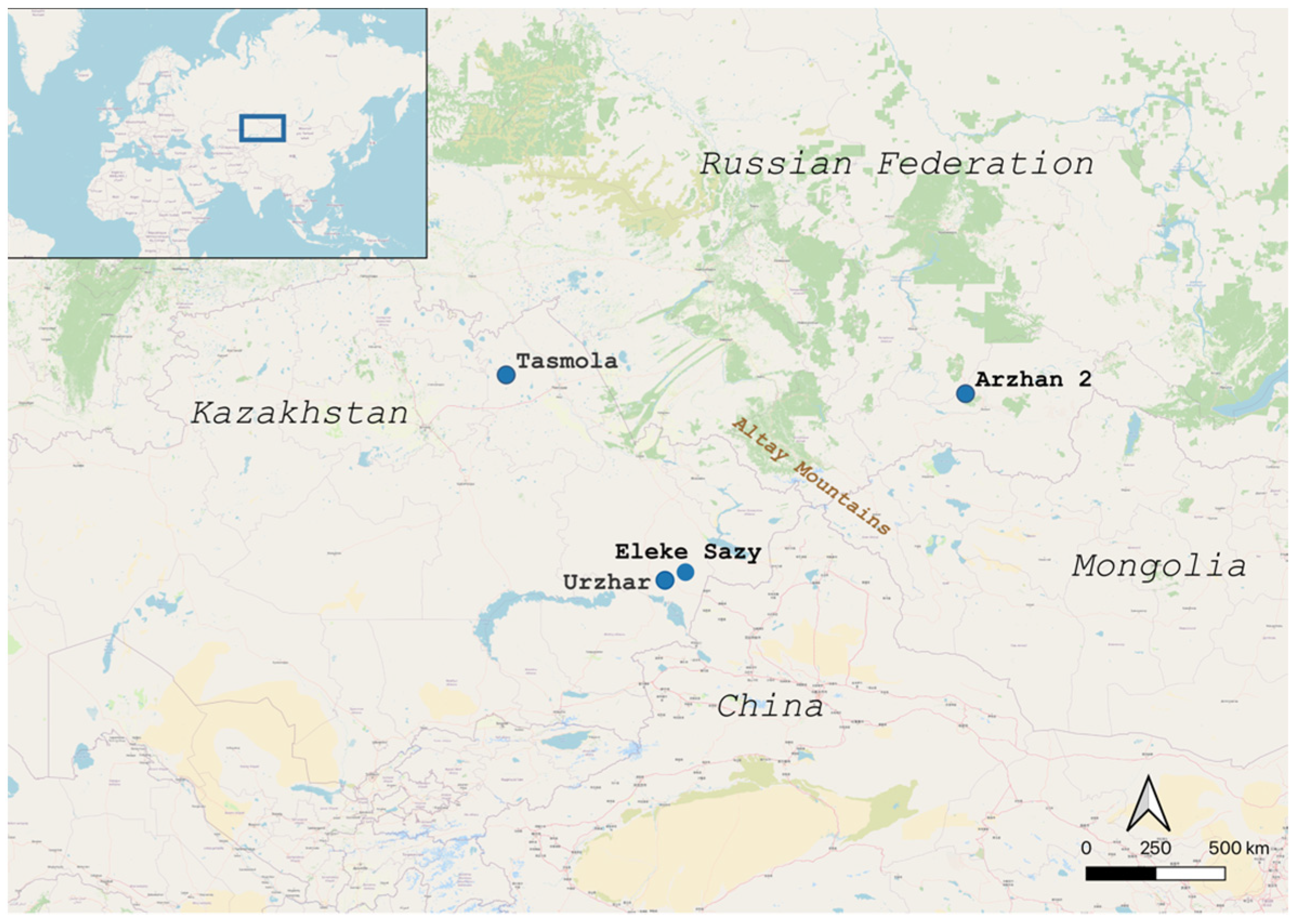
Location of the Tasmola kurgan
