= Fofonovo =

Fofonovo Фофоново
- Selo
- Location within Republic of Buryatia Location within Russia
- Coordinates: 52°03′N 106°45′E
- Country: Russia
- Region: Republic of Buryatia
- District: Kabansky District
- Time zone: UTC+8:00

Fofonovo (Russian: Фофоново) is a rural locality (a selo) in Kabansky District, Republic of Buryatia, Russia. The population was 279 as of 2010. There are 5 streets.

== Geography ==
Fofonovo is located 33 kilometres (21 mi) east of Kabansk (the district's administrative centre) by road. Beregovaya is the nearest rural locality.
