= ADD3 =

Protein-coding gene in the species Homo sapiens

Identifiers
- Aliases: ADD3, ADDL, adducin 3, CPSQ3
- External IDs: OMIM: 601568; MGI: 1351615; GeneCards: ADD3

Gene location (Human)
Chr.	Chromosome 10 (human)
Band	10q25.1-q25.2	Start	109,996,368 bp
Band	10q25.1-q25.2	End	110,135,565 bp

Gene location (Mouse)
Chr.	Chromosome 19 (mouse)
Band	19 D2|19 47.18 cM	Start	53,140,443 bp
Band	19 D2|19 47.18 cM	End	53,247,399 bp
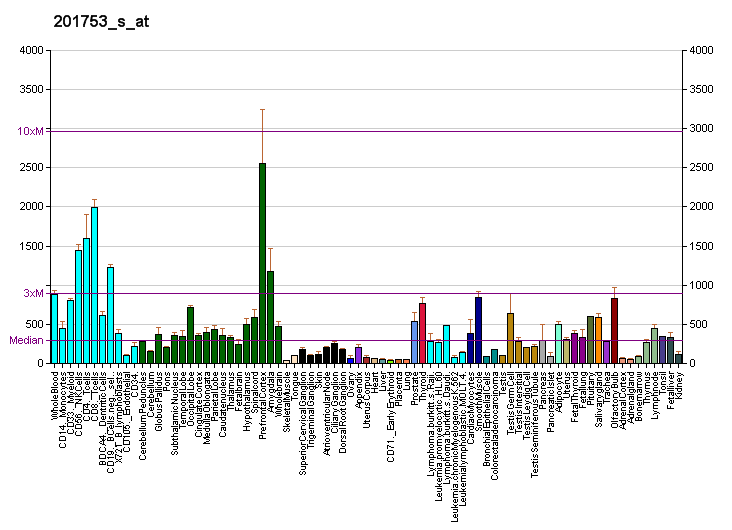

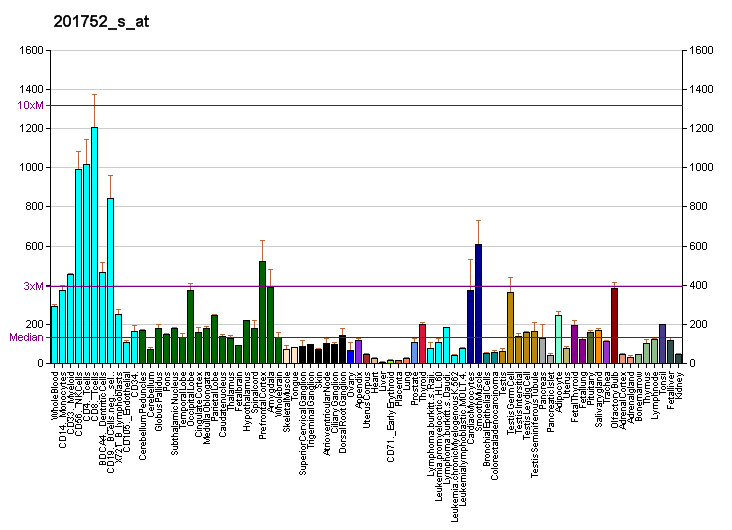

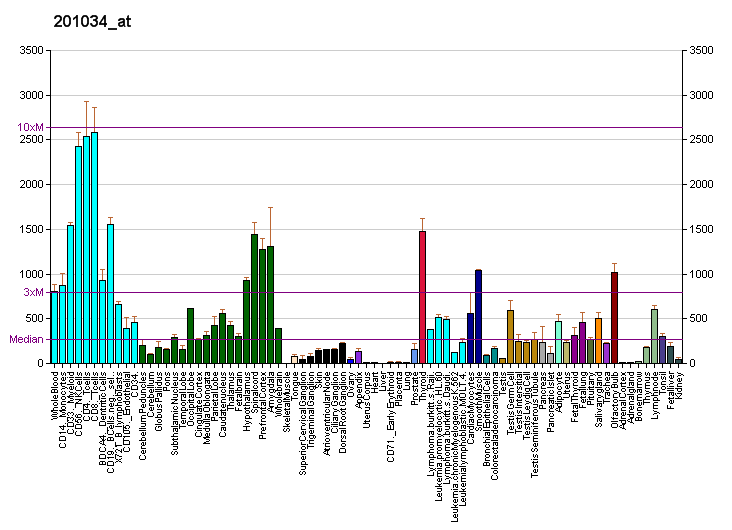
RNA expression pattern
Bgee	Human / Mouse (ortholog); Top expressed in: secondary oocyte; Region I of hippocampus proper; dorsal motor nucleus of vagus nerve; corpus callosum; external globus pallidus; corpus epididymis; trigeminal ganglion; retinal pigment epithelium; subthalamic nucleus; caput epididymis / Top expressed in: gastrula; transitional epithelium of urinary bladder; interventricular septum; stria vascularis; granulocyte; seminal vesicula; blood; neural layer of retina; vestibular membrane of cochlear duct; atrium; More reference expression data
BioGPS	More reference expression data
Gene ontology
Molecular function	structural molecule activity; actin binding; structural constituent of cytoskeleton; calmodulin binding; spectrin binding; actin filament binding
Cellular component	condensed nuclear chromosome; cytosol; plasma membrane; cell cortex; cytoskeleton; membrane; brush border; nucleoplasm; cell-cell junction; cytoplasm; postsynaptic density; plasma membrane raft
Biological process	transmembrane transport; cytoskeleton organization; barbed-end actin filament capping; actin filament bundle assembly
Sources:Amigo / QuickGO
Orthologs
Databases	NCBI: entry; OMA: entry
Species	Human	Mouse
Entrez	120	27360
Ensembl	ENSG00000148700	ENSMUSG00000025026
UniProt	Q9UEY8	Q9QYB5
RefSeq (mRNA)	NM_001121; NM_016824; NM_019903; NM_001320591; NM_001320592 NM_001320593; NM_001320594	NM_001164099; NM_001164100; NM_001164101; NM_001277100; NM_013758
RefSeq (protein)	NP_001112; NP_001307520; NP_001307521; NP_001307522; NP_001307523 NP_058432; NP_063968	NP_001157571; NP_001157572; NP_001157573; NP_001264029; NP_038786
Location (UCSC)	Chr 10: 110 – 110.14 Mb	Chr 19: 53.14 – 53.25 Mb
PubMed search
- Wikidata
View/Edit Human	View/Edit Mouse

Gamma-adducin is a protein that in humans is encoded by the ADD3 gene.

Adducins are heteromeric proteins composed of different subunits referred to as adducin alpha, beta and gamma. The three subunits are encoded by distinct genes and belong to a family of membrane skeletal proteins involved in the assembly of spectrin-actin network in erythrocytes and at sites of cell-cell contact in epithelial tissues. While adducins alpha and gamma are ubiquitously expressed, the expression of adducin beta is restricted to brain and hematopoietic tissues. Adducin, originally purified from human erythrocytes, was found to be a heterodimer of adducins alpha and beta. Polymorphisms resulting in amino acid substitutions in these two subunits have been associated with the regulation of blood pressure in an animal model of hypertension. Heterodimers consisting of alpha and gamma subunits have also been described. Structurally, each subunit is composed of two distinct domains. The amino-terminal region is protease-resistant and globular in shape, while the carboxy-terminal region is protease-sensitive. The latter contains multiple phosphorylation sites for protein kinase C, the binding site for calmodulin, and is required for association with spectrin and actin. Alternatively spliced adducin gamma transcripts encoding different isoforms have been described. The functions of the different isoforms are not known.
