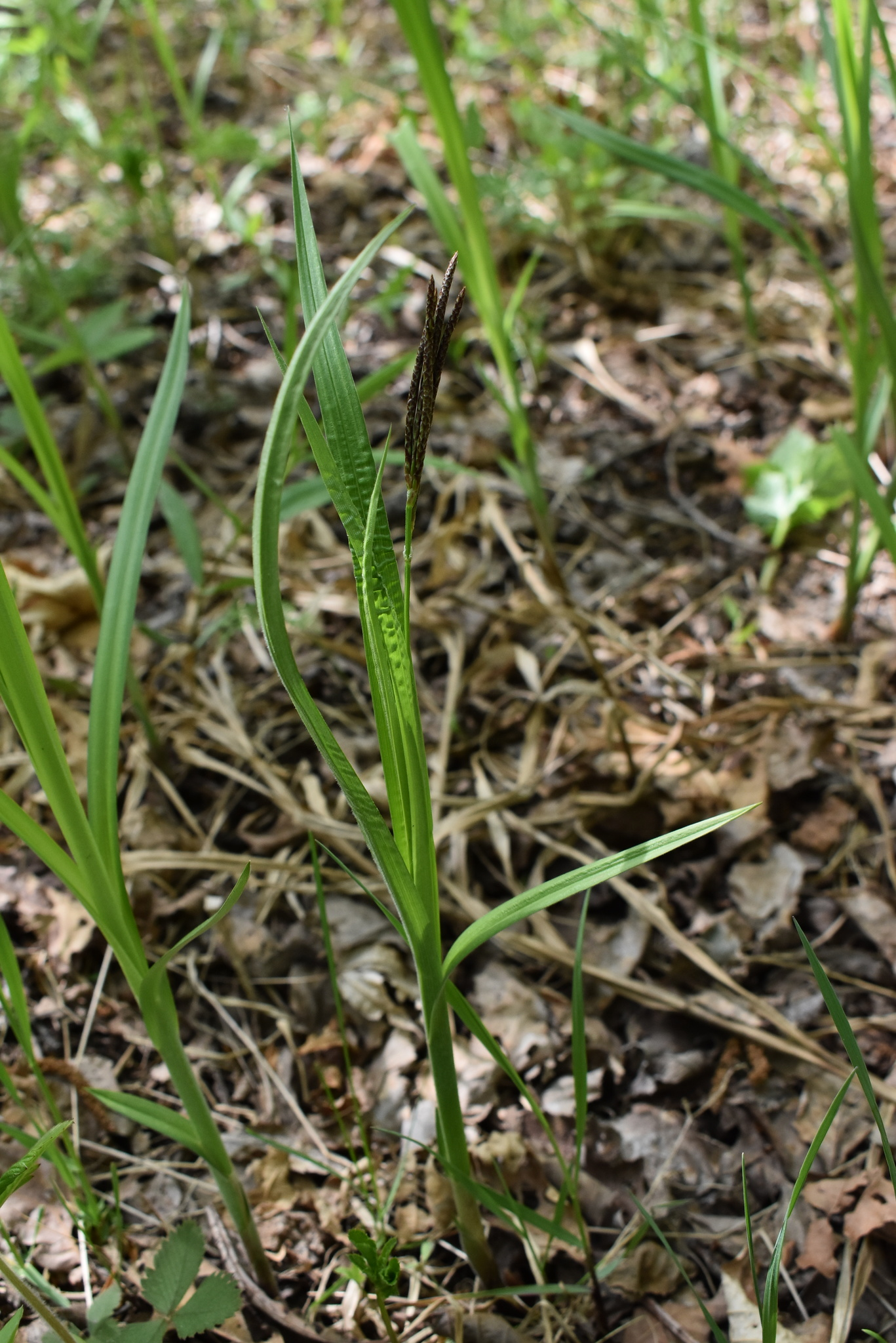
- Habit

Scientific classification
- Kingdom: Plantae
- Clade: Tracheophytes
- Clade: Angiosperms
- Clade: Monocots
- Clade: Commelinids
- Order: Poales
- Family: Cyperaceae
- Genus: Carex
- Species: C. sordida

Binomial name
- Carex sordida Van Heurck & Müll.Arg.

Synonyms
- Carex akanensis Franch.; Carex amurensis Kük.

= Carex sordida =

Species of grass-like plant

Carex sordida is a species of sedge (family Cyperaceae), native to southern Siberia, Mongolia, Manchuria, the Russian Far East, Korea, and Japan. Its chromosome number is 2n = 100.
