= Begazy Dandybai Mausolea =

Kazakh mausoleums of the Begazy-Dandybai culture

Coordinates: 48.267°N 75.346°E

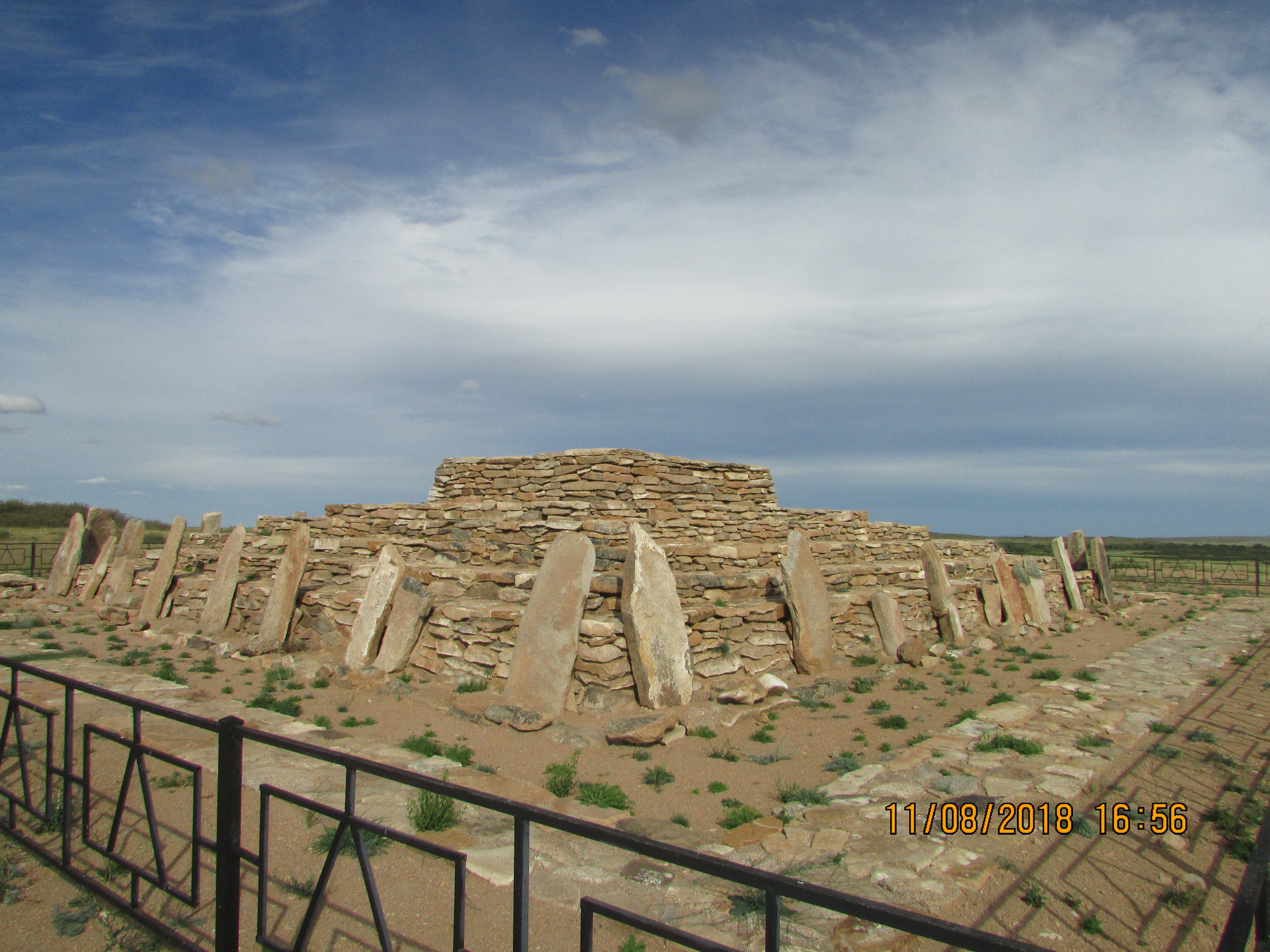
Karazhartas burial ground from afar. Bronze Age in the Shet region 15th century BC

The Mausolea of the Begazy–Dandybai culture are located in mountain valleys of Central Kazakhstan.

== Site description ==
The collection of 18 mausolea, dating from the 12th to 8th centuries BC, incorporates unique architectural and constructive style. The commonality between all examples is a central room surrounded by two or three perimeter walls made of stacked stone or large vertical stone slabs. The central rooms house sarcophagi and altars, which contrast the nearby burials outside the mausolea in the open. This fact hints at an embedded social stratification and hierarchy within Begazy–Dandybai society, and signifies those buried in the mausolea as royalty, noblemen, or priests.

The Mausolea usually occur within close range to ancient settlements of up to 10 hectares in area, which hints at a once flourishing economy based on agriculture, irrigation, domestication of animals, and use of precious metals found in nearby mines.

== World Heritage status ==
This site was added to the UNESCO World Heritage Tentative List on September 24, 1998, in the Cultural category.(see List of World Heritage Sites in Kazakhstan)
