= Akmol =

Akmol Ақмол
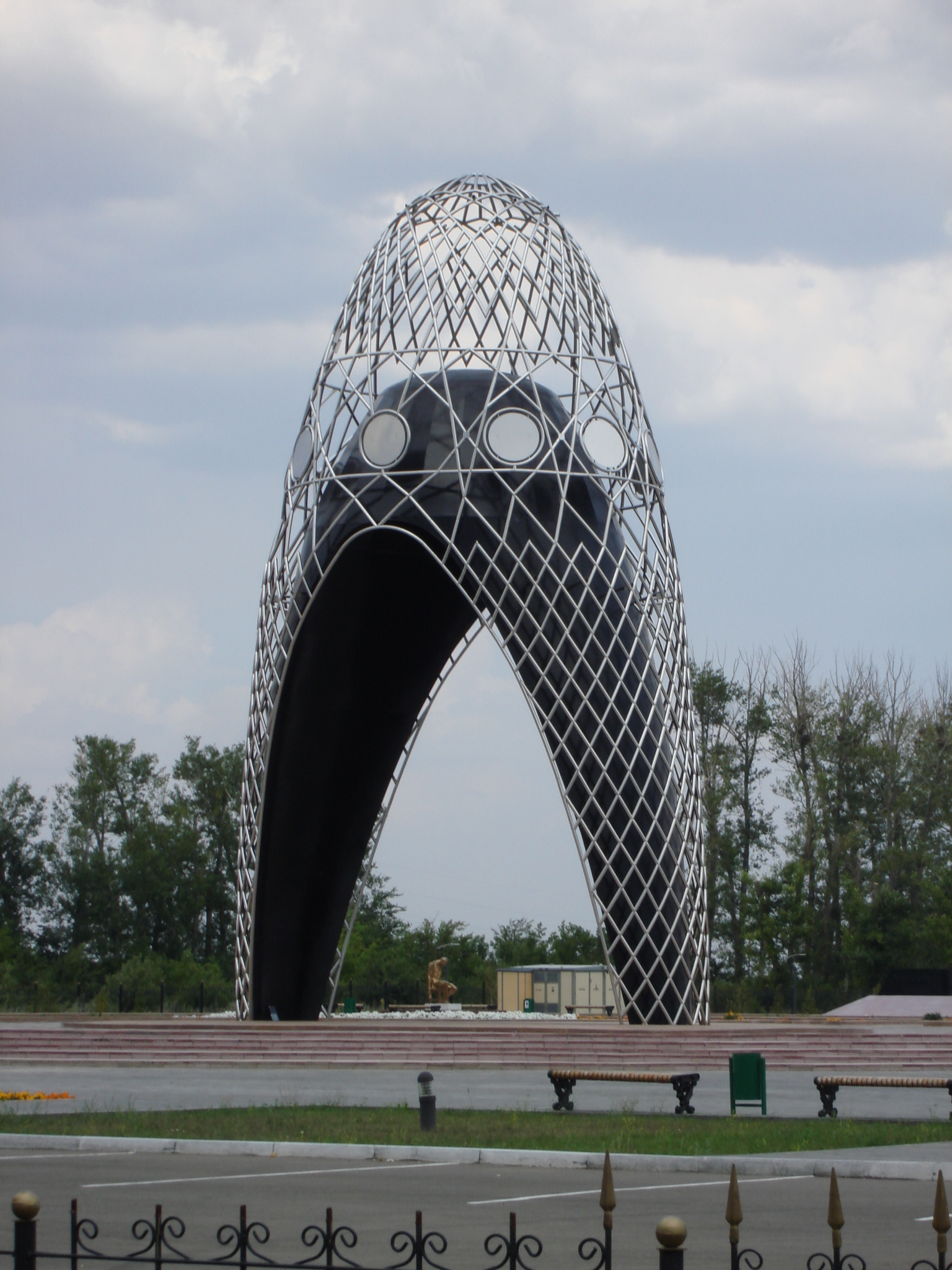
- Ķajġylary arch

- Location within Kazakhstan
- Coordinates: 51°04′23″N 70°58′45″E
- Country: Kazakhstan
- Region: Akmola Region
- District: Tselinograd District
- Established: 1938

Government
  - Akim: Malgazhdar Tatkeev

Population (2012)
  - Total: 5,769
- Time zone: UTC+6 (UTC+6)
- Postal code: 021800
- Area code: +71651

Akmol (Kazakh: Ақмол, Aqmol), formerly Malīnovka until 2007, is a rural locality (selo) and the administrative center of Tselinograd District, Akmola Region, Kazakhstan, roughly 17 kilometres (11 mi) west of Astana. Population: 5,711 (2009 census results); 4,835 (1999 census results). As of 2012, it had a population of 5769 people. As of 2015, Zhanat Beisekeyev is the local akim (mayor).

== Geography ==
The village is located on the bank of Lake Zhalanash, on the paved road which connects Astana and Korgalzhyn. Zhanazhol (5.4 km) and Rodionovka (5.7 km) are nearby. The closest railway station is in Astana. Akmol is east of the Korgalzhyn Nature Reserve, part of the UNESCO heritage site Saryarka — Steppe and Lakes of Northern Kazakhstan.

== History ==
The locality was founded in the 1930 as a settlement serving the prison camp. It was known as the 26-ya Tochka and was part of Akmolinsky District of Akmolinsk Region. In the 1960s, both the district and the region were renamed Tselinograd. In 1976, the settlement was officially renamed Malinovka. On 9 January 2007, the administrative center of the district was transferred into the selo of Malinovka, which was simultaneously renamed Akmol.

== Economy ==
Traditionally the local economy has been based on the poultry industry, with the prominent Akmola-Phoenix firm employing some 500 people. The Tekeli mining firm is also operational in granite mining in the area and runs a processing plant. The Akmol village has a regional telecommunication center, a cultural center, and a new regional court house.

== Landmarks ==
During the Stalin era, the locality became notorious for the presence of a labor camp for "wives and children of men who were interned elsewhere as 'betrayers of the motherland'" (Akmol Labour Camp for Wives of Traitors of the Motherland, abbreviated as ALZhIR). The Museum of the Victims of Repression in Akmol opened on 31 May 2007; it documents the events, and an arched monument commemorates the Great Patriotic War. A railway carriage depicting a deportation train stands alongside. Two fountains stand on the square in front of this monument. An alleyway behind the museum displays the names of locals who fell in the war.

The local theatre or "house of culture" has around 630 seats, and hosts various events, such as the Russian Folk Choir. The Malinowski Folk Choir was established in 1973. There is also a dance group and an orchestra of Kazakh folk instruments.

The mosque in the town was completed between 1995 and 1998. The 390.6 square metres (4,204 sq ft) building has two towers and a dome height of 9 metres (30 ft), and caters for more than 200 worshippers. There is also a Roman Catholic parochial church (Our Lady of the Rosary), within the Archdiocese of Astana.
