= Korgalzhyn (disambiguation) =

Korgalzhyn may refer to:

- Korgalzhyn, a village in Akmola Region, Kazakhstan
- Korgalzhyn District, a district in Kazakhstan
- Korgalzhyn (lake), a lake of the Tengiz basin, Kazakhstan
- Korgalzhyn Nature Reserve, a protected area in Kazakhstan
