= Sholakshalkar =

- Шолақшалқар
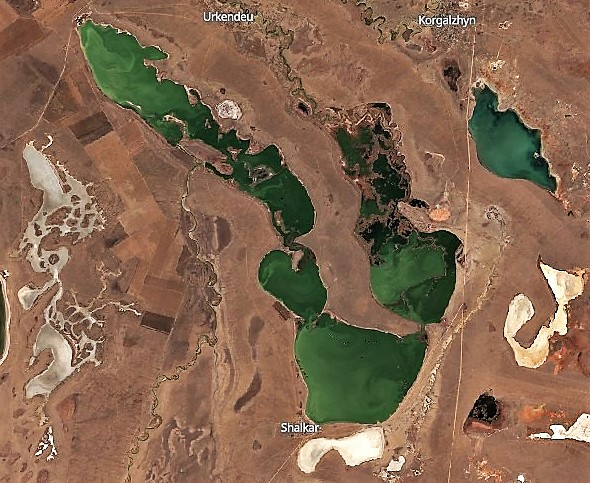
- Sholakshalkar Sentinel-2 image

- Location within Kazakhstan
- Location: Kazakh Uplands
- Coordinates: 50°32′50″N 69°50′08″E
- Type: Fluvial lakes
- Primary inflows: Nura
- Primary outflows: Nura
- Basin countries: Kazakhstan
- Max. length: 25 kilometers (16 mi) (Sholak and Shalkar)
- Max. width: 5.5 kilometers (3.4 mi) (Shalkar)
- Surface area: 70 square kilometers (27 sq mi) (total)
- Surface elevation: 317 meters (1,040 ft)
- Islands: yes

Sholakshalkar (Kazakh: Шолақшалқар; Russian: Шолакшалкар) is a lake group in Korgalzhyn District, Akmola Region, Kazakhstan.

Sholakshalkar is one of the main lakes of the Tengiz-Korgalzhyn Depression. It belongs to the Korgalzhyn group of lakes. The nearest settlements are Korgalzhyn village, located 5 kilometers (3.1 mi) to the NNE of the northern end of lake Koktal. and Urkendeu (Өркендеу), 3 kilometers (1.9 mi) to the northeast of the shore of lake Sholak. Shalkar village lies at the southern end of lake Shalkar.

== Geography ==
Sholakshalkar is a group of three connected freshwater lakes lying in a flat, swampy basin, close to the east of lake Korgalzhyn. The lakes are elongated, stretching roughly from northwest to southeast. The largest one is Sholak (31.9 square kilometers (12.3 sq mi)) in the northwest, followed by Shalkar (24.5 square kilometers (9.5 sq mi)) to the south of it. Lake Koktal (13.5 square kilometers (5.2 sq mi)), also known as Birtaban, lies to the east of Shalkar, separated from it by a short sound. The valley is flat and marshy and the shores of the lakes are generally rocky and steep.

The Nura river flows into the Koktal lakeshore from the northeast and exits the lake group from the western shore of lake Sholak, flowing southwestwards towards Korgalzhyn.

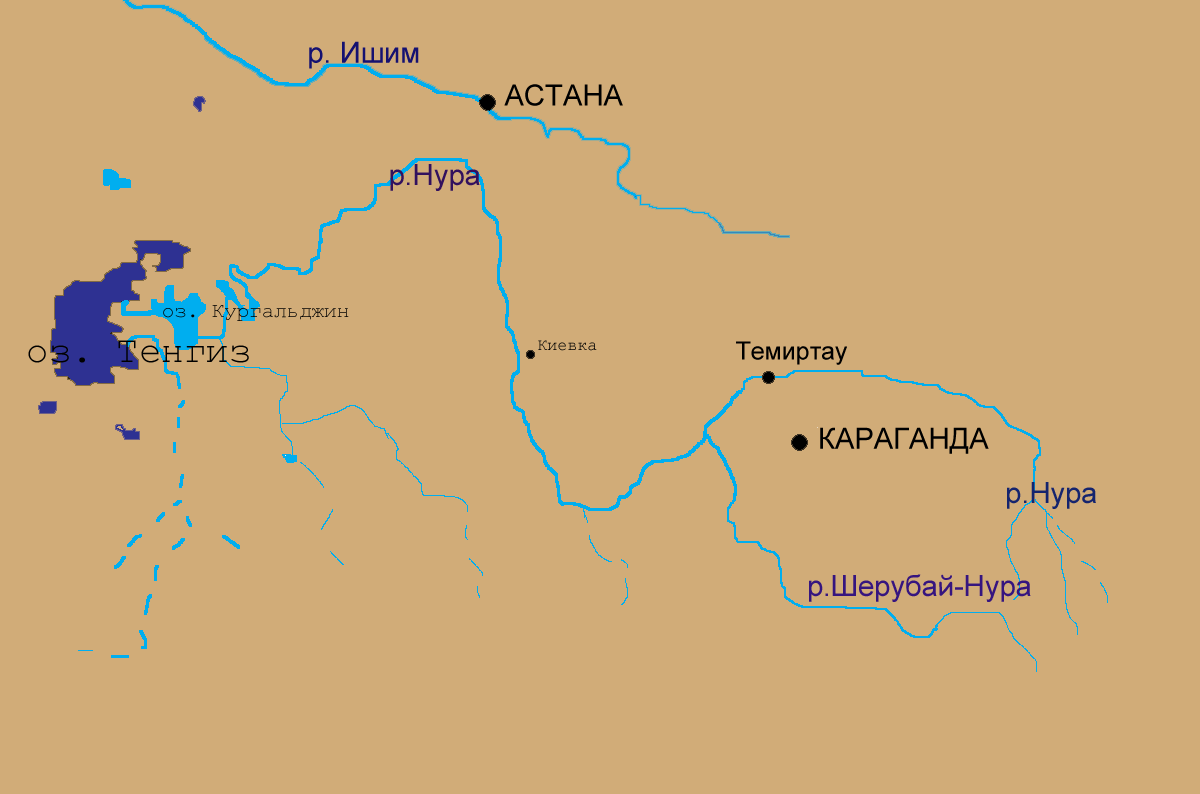
Course of the Nura with Korgalzhyn in pale blue and Sholakshalkar a little to the right of it.

== Fauna ==
The main fish species in the lake are crucian carp, pike, ide and carp.

== See also ==
- List of lakes of Kazakhstan
- Saryarka – Steppe and Lakes of Northern Kazakhstan
