= Kiyakty =

Lake in Kazakhstan

- Қияқты
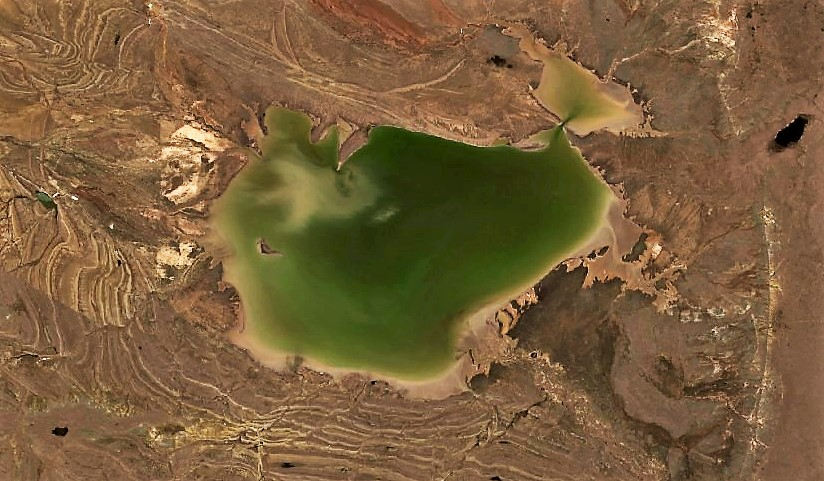
- Sentinel-2 image of the lake in April

- Location within Kazakhstan
- Location: Kazakh Uplands
- Coordinates: 50°00′00″N 69°30′09″E
- Type: endorheic
- Primary inflows: Kiyakty river
- Catchment area: 669 square kilometers (258 sq mi)
- Basin countries: Kazakhstan
- Max. length: 16.7 kilometers (10.4 mi)
- Max. width: 8.2 kilometers (5.1 mi)
- Surface area: 51.6 square kilometers (19.9 sq mi)
- Residence time: UTC+6
- Surface elevation: 398 meters (1,306 ft)
- Islands: one islet

Kiyakty (Kazakh: Қияқты; Russian: Киякты) is a salt lake in Nura District, Karaganda Region, Kazakhstan.

Kiyakty lies in the northwestern sector of the district. The nearest inhabited locality is Zhanbobek (Жанбөбек) located 23 kilometers (14 mi) to the southwest of the lakeshore.

== Geography ==
Kiyakty is an endorheic lake of the Kulanotpes basin that lies at 398 meters (1,306 ft) above sea level. It is located 16 kilometers (9.9 mi) to the south of the southern shore of Lake Tengiz. The Kiyakty, an intermittent river, flows into the southeastern corner. This river usually dries up in the summer. There is a 600 meters (2,000 ft) long islet off the western lakeshore.

The northern lakeshore is steep, between 1 meter (3 ft 3 in) and 1.8 meters (5 ft 11 in) high. The western, southern and eastern shorelines are flat and marshy. The lake is fed by snow, precipitation and groundwater. Its water level is usually at its highest in April and at its lowest in October. Lake Kerey lies 30 kilometers (19 mi) to the WNW and river Kon 10 kilometers (6.2 mi) to the east. In recent years, Kiyakty is turning into a sor.

== Flora and fauna ==
Lake Kiyakty is surrounded by steppe vegetation and its basin is a seasonal grazing ground for local cattle. In August 1985 there was reportedly a colony of about 300 greater flamingos in the lake.

== See also ==
- List of lakes of Kazakhstan
