= Shoshkakol =

Lake in Kazakhstan

- Шошқакөл
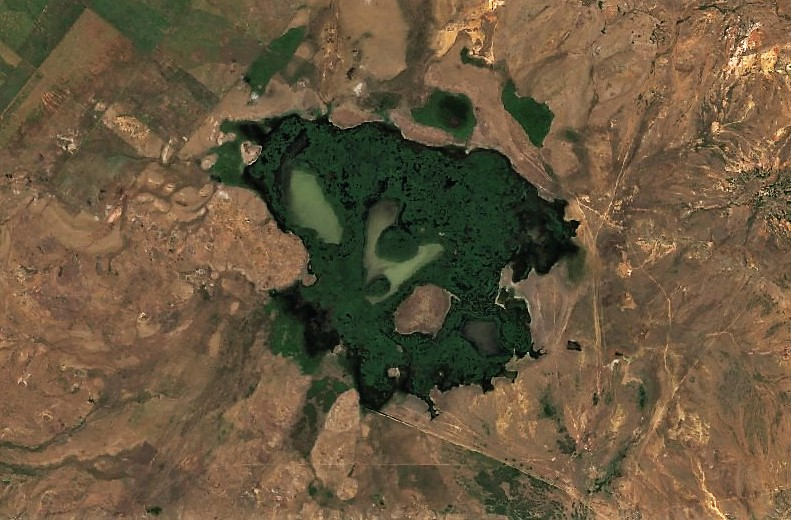
- Sentinel-2 image of the lake in late June

- Location within Kazakhstan
- Location: Kazakh Uplands
- Coordinates: 49°16′10″N 70°48′40″E
- Type: endorheic
- Catchment area: 360 square kilometers (140 sq mi)
- Basin countries: Kazakhstan
- Max. length: 8.5 kilometers (5.3 mi)
- Max. width: 6.7 kilometers (4.2 mi)
- Surface area: 32.7 square kilometers (12.6 sq mi)
- Average depth: 1 meter (3 ft 3 in)
- Max. depth: 9 meters (30 ft)
- Residence time: UTC+6
- Surface elevation: 458.5 meters (1,504 ft)
- Islands: Araltobe
- Settlements: Aynabulak

Shoshkakol (Kazakh: Шошқакөл; Russian: Шошкаколь) is a lake in Zhanaarka District, Ulytau Region, and Nura District, Karaganda Region, Kazakhstan.

The border between Ulytau and Karaganda regions runs across the lake from northwest to southeast. Aynabulak village is located 4 kilometers (2.5 mi) to the southeast of the lake.

== Geography ==
Shoshkakol is an endorheic lake. Two rivers of the Nura basin, the Kulanotpes and the Sonaly, flow northwards close to the lake basin. The lake is roughly square-shaped and has a fairly large island, —Araltobe with a length of 1.5 kilometers (0.93 mi) and a width of 1.1 kilometers (0.68 mi), in the southern half. The lakeshores are flat and sandy, overgrown with grass. Lake Sulukol lies 50 kilometers (31 mi) to the east.

Shoshkakol is a drying lake. Its water level has dropped significantly in recent decades and currently there are only two residual pools left. Most of the remaining surface of the lake is marshy, encumbered with aquatic vegetation. The lake water is saline and bitter.

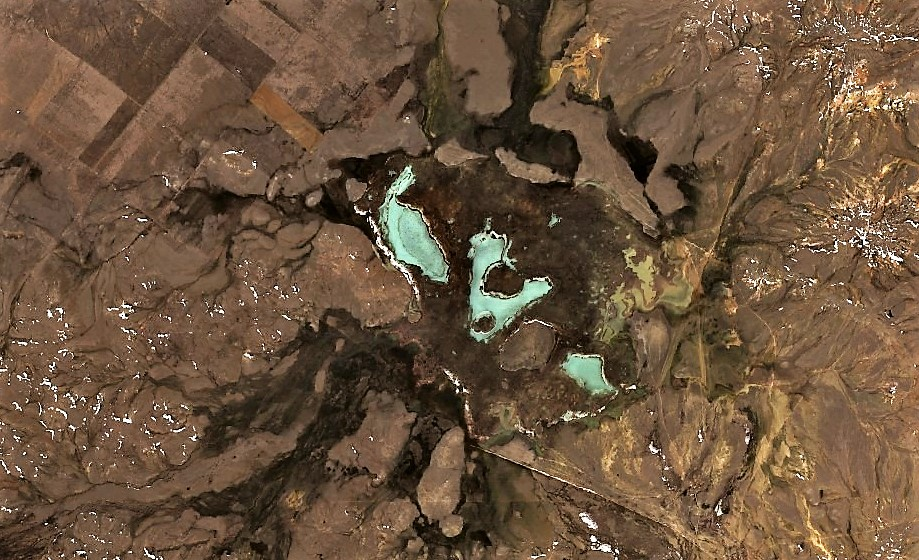
The frozen residual pools of the lake in April.

== Flora and fauna ==
Shoshkakol is surrounded by highland steppe. Reeds cover most of the shallow parts of the surface. Migratory birds, such as ducks, swans and geese, nest at the lake in the spring season.

== See also ==
- List of lakes of Kazakhstan
