= Ulken Kundyzdy =

River in Kazakhstan

Ulken Kundyzdy Үлкен Құндызды
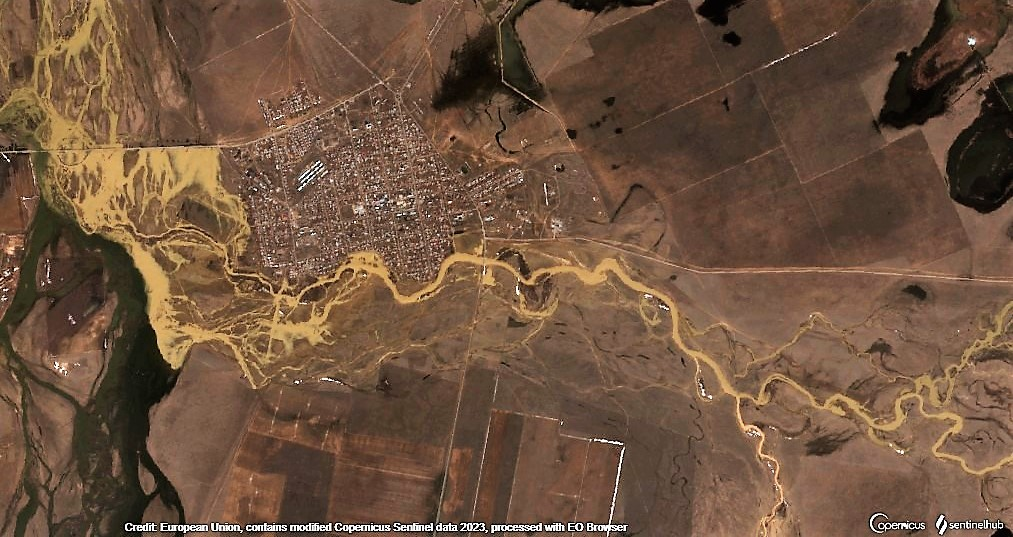
- Near Nura village during spring floods

- Mouth location in Kazakhstan

Location
- Countries: Kazakhstan

Physical characteristics
- Source: Mount Koyandy; Kazakh Uplands
  - coordinates: 50°25′39″N 72°30′21″E
- Mouth: Nura
  - coordinates: 50°15′29″N 71°30′17″E
- Length: 115 km (71 mi)
- Basin size: 3,150 km^{2} (1,220 sq mi)
- Discharge
  - average: 0.55 cubic metres per second (19 cu ft/s) at Sunkar

Basin features
- Progression: Nura → Tengiz

The Ulken Kundyzdy (Kazakh: Үлкен Құндызды) is a river in the Sarybel and Nura districts, Karaganda Region, Kazakhstan. It is 115 kilometres (71 mi) long and has a catchment area of 3,150 square kilometres (1,220 sq mi).

The Ulken Kundyzdy river is one of the main tributaries of the Nura. It freezes between November and April.

== Course ==
The Ulken Kundyzdy has its sources in the Kazakh Uplands, a little to the north of Kunduzdy village, northwest of Temirtau. It originates on the southern slopes of Mount Koyandy and flows roughly southwestwards and westwards along its course. Finally, it reaches the Nura and enters it from the right bank near Nura village (formerly Kievka), the district capital.

The Ulken Kundyzdy is fed mainly by precipitation and groundwater. Its valley is wide and there are many stretches with rocky banks. The river meanders in its middle and lower course. Its main tributaries are the Yeltok, Topan and Sabyrkozha.

== Fauna ==
Some of the fish species found in the Ulken Kundyzdy include crucian carp, perch and gudgeon.

== See also ==
- List of rivers of Kazakhstan
