= Tengizi Islands =

- Island group
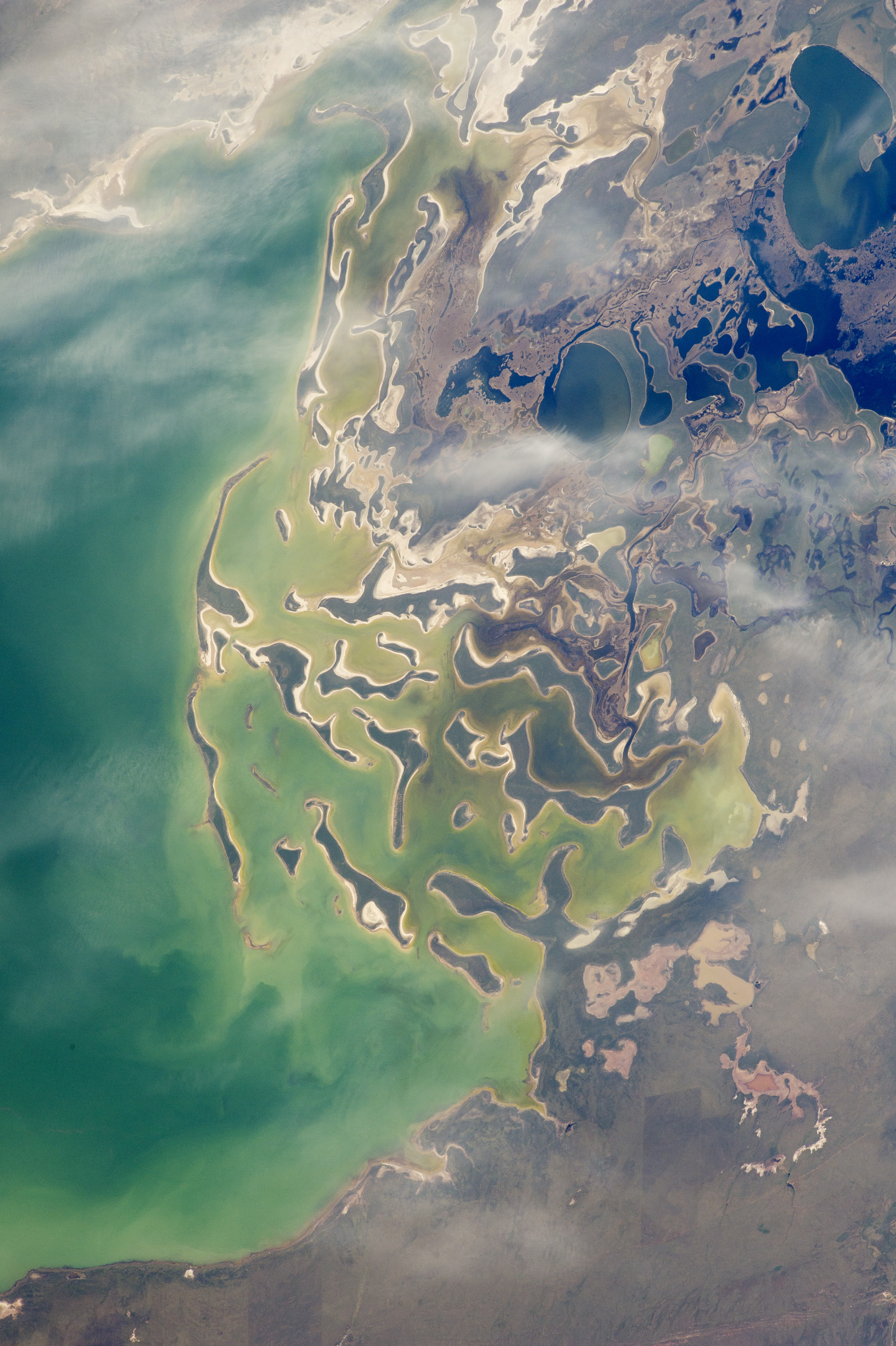
- NASA picture of eastern Tengiz Lake with the Tengizi Islands.

- Location within Kazakhstan
- Coordinates: 50°21′N 69°03′E

Population
  - Total: uninhabited

The Tengizi Islands (also Tengiz Islands) are an archipelago in Korgalzhyn District, Akmola Region, Kazakhstan.

Located in Lake Tengiz, the archipelago is about 37 kilometres (23 mi) long and 16 kilometres (10 mi) wide. It is formed by roughly 70 small and medium-sized islands. These form a compact cluster off the deeply indented eastern shore of the lake.

== Ecology ==
The Tengizi Islands are part of the Korgalzhyn Nature Reserve.
