= Kon (river) =

River in Kazakhstan

Kon Көң
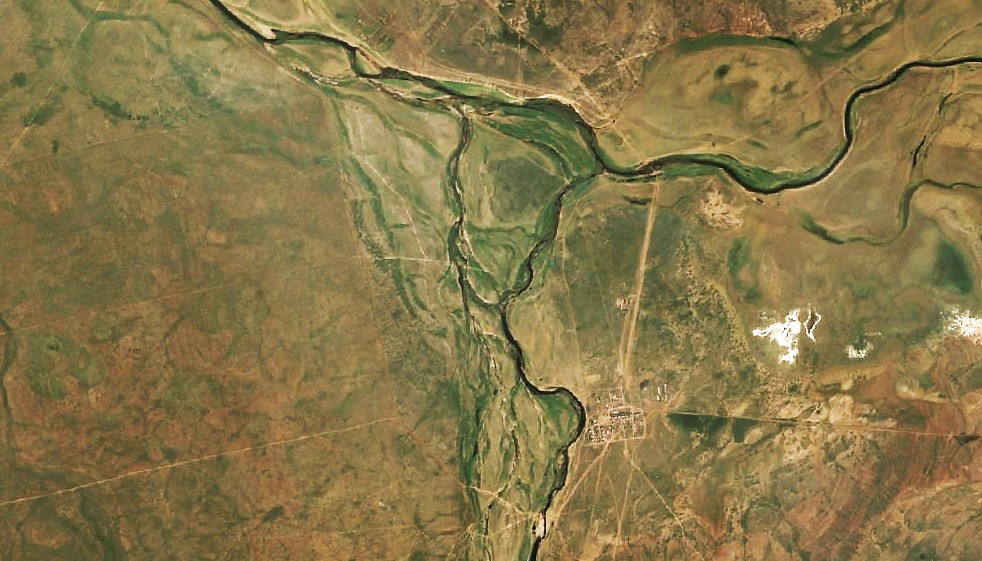
- Mouths of the Kon in the Kulanotpes (top) Sentinel-2 image

- Mouth location in Kazakhstan

Location
- Country: Kazakhstan

Physical characteristics
- Source: Zeldiadyr
  - coordinates: 49°22′13″N 67°44′06″E (Zhaksykon)
  - elevation: ca 700 m (2,300 ft)
- Mouth: Kulanotpes
  - coordinates: 50°11′29″N 69°30′03″E
  - elevation: 320 m (1,050 ft)
- Length: 160 km (99 mi)
- Basin size: 4,050 km^{2} (1,560 sq mi)
- Discharge
  - average: 0.82 m^{3}/s (29 cu ft/s)

Basin features
- Progression: Kulanotpes→Lake Tengiz

The Kon (Kazakh: Көң; Russian: Кон) is a river in the Nura District, Karaganda Region, Kazakhstan. It has a length of 160 km (99 mi) and a drainage basin of 4,050 km^{2} (1,560 sq mi).

The Kon is the most important tributary of the Kulanotpes, followed by the 106 km (66 mi) long Sonaly. 2.5 km (1.6 mi) to the south of its mouth lies Kulanotpes village.

== Course ==
The Kon river originates in the Zeldiadyr, a range of mountains located by the eastern part of the Ulytau Range, one of the main mountain groups of the Kazakh Uplands. In its upper course the river is known as Zhaksykon and flows within a narrow valley. It heads first roughly eastwards along the feet of the southern slopes of the Zeldiadyr, bending northeastwards at the eastern end of the range, while still as the Zhaksykon. Further downriver it bends northwards and is joined by the Zhamankon from the right, being known as the Kon after the confluence. The river flows then roughly northwards within a 2 km (1.2 mi) to 3 km (1.9 mi) wide floodplain all along its course, sometimes dividing into channels as a braided river. In its last stretch the Kon forks into two and joins the left bank of the Kulanotpes.

The river is surrounded by highland steppe. Its channel is often bound by not well-defined banks. North of the confluence of the Zhaksykon and Zhamankon the river has no significant tributaries. The annual water flow of the Kon is 53,000,000 m^{3} (1.9×10^{9} cu ft) and the seasonal fluctuation in water volume is very pronounced. In the spring the water level may rise between 4 m (13 ft) to 5 m (16 ft) and in the summer the river may stop flowing and splits into disconnected pools. The average duration of the dry period is 127 days, but in years of severe drought it may reach 250 days. Following the melting of the surrounding snows in the spring, the river water is fresh, but has a tendency to become brackish, with an increased mineralization especially towards the autumn.

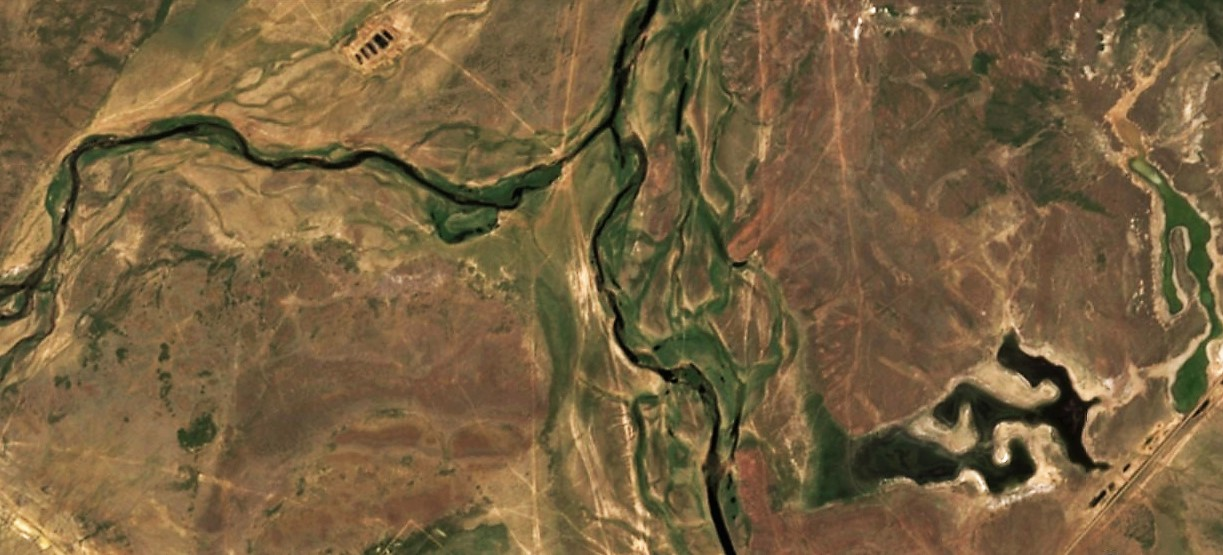
Confluence of the Zhaksykon (left) and Zhamankon (center) to form the Kon (top).

== See also ==
- List of rivers of Kazakhstan
