= Korgalzhyn =

Korgalzhyn Қорғалжын Коргалжын
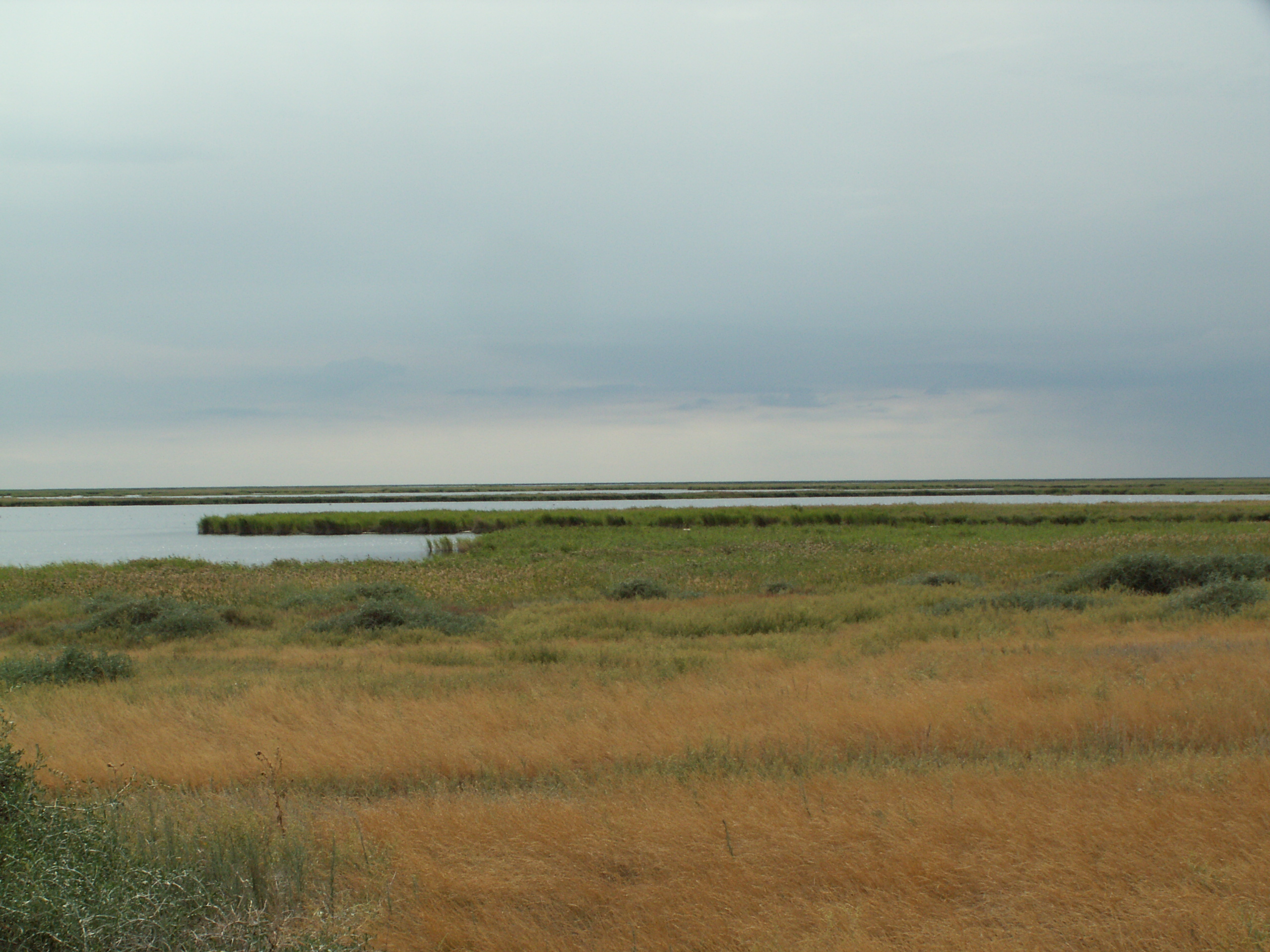
- Korgalzhinskiy Nature Reserve

- Location in Kazakhstan
- Coordinates: 50°34.929′N 70°00.819′E
- Country: Kazakhstan
- Region: Akmola Region

Korgalzhyn (Kazakh: Қорғалжын, Qorğaljyn) is a village in the Akmola Region, Kazakhstan. It serves as the administrative center of Korgalzhyn District. The Nura River slowly flows around the selo. It is situated 120 km south-west of Astana. Population: 4,161 (2009 census results);5,717 (1999 census results).

The selo serves as the main and only base for entering the Saryarka — Steppe and Lakes of Northern Kazakhstan Unesco World Heritage site with Lake Tengiz at its heart. Many foreigners, mostly birdwatchers from all over the world come to the selo.

== Geography ==
The village is located in the central part of the Korgalzhyn district, on the left bank of the Nura River, at a distance of approximately 302 kilometers (in a straight line) south of the regional center - the city of Kokshetau, and 117 kilometers southwest of the capital of Kazakhstan - the city of Astana.

The village is located on the Kazakh Uplands. The average altitude in the village is about 330 meters above sea level. The terrain is a continuous plain with small hills and water areas.

The village forms a kind of automobile hub: from the east there is the regional highway of KS-16 "Korgalzhyn - Arykty - Sabyndy", from the north - the KS-45 (access to the village of Korgalzhyn) which separates from the R-2 highway "Astana - Korgalzhyn". From the south there is a country road from Barshino, Nura District, Karaganda Region.

== Climate ==
The climate is cold-temperate, with good humidity. The average annual air temperature is positive and is about +4.6 °C. The average monthly air temperature in July reaches +21.4 °C. The average monthly temperature in January is about -14.3 °C. The average annual precipitation is about 360 mm. The bulk of precipitation falls between June and July.

Climate data for Korgalzhyn (1991–2020)
Month	Jan	Feb	Mar	Apr	May	Jun	Jul	Aug	Sep	Oct	Nov	Dec	Year
Mean daily maximum °C (°F)	−11.5 (11.3)	−10.0 (14.0)	−2.5 (27.5)	12.4 (54.3)	21.4 (70.5)	26.6 (79.9)	27.7 (81.9)	26.7 (80.1)	19.7 (67.5)	10.9 (51.6)	−1.3 (29.7)	−8.7 (16.3)	9.3 (48.7)
Daily mean °C (°F)	−16.0 (3.2)	−15.2 (4.6)	−7.6 (18.3)	6.0 (42.8)	14.5 (58.1)	19.8 (67.6)	20.9 (69.6)	19.5 (67.1)	12.6 (54.7)	4.7 (40.5)	−5.3 (22.5)	−13.0 (8.6)	3.4 (38.1)
Mean daily minimum °C (°F)	−20.6 (−5.1)	−20.2 (−4.4)	−12.4 (9.7)	0.3 (32.5)	7.6 (45.7)	12.9 (55.2)	14.4 (57.9)	12.5 (54.5)	6.0 (42.8)	−0.4 (31.3)	−9.3 (15.3)	−17.5 (0.5)	−2.2 (28.0)
Average precipitation mm (inches)	19.2 (0.76)	20.1 (0.79)	19.3 (0.76)	17.6 (0.69)	24.4 (0.96)	40.6 (1.60)	38.5 (1.52)	25.4 (1.00)	20.1 (0.79)	24.7 (0.97)	23.7 (0.93)	23.6 (0.93)	297.4 (11.71)
Average precipitation days (≥ 1.0 mm)	5.4	5.1	4.5	4.0	5.3	6.2	6.7	4.4	3.9	5.0	5.5	6.1	62.1
Source: NOAA
