= Conservancy areas of Kazakhstan =

Protected areas in Kazakhstan

In Kazakhstan, there are 25 specially protected areas, including 10 nature reserves and 11 national parks. These environmental institutions owned by the state.

- Aksu-Zhabagly State Nature Reserve
- Almaty State Natural Reserve
- Naurzum State Nature Reserve
- Barsakelmessky State Nature Reserve
- Korgalzhyn State Nature Reserve
- Markakolsky State Nature Reserve
- Ustyurt State Nature Reserve
- West-Altai State Nature Reserve
- Alakol State Nature Reserve
- Karatau State Nature Reserve

| No. | Picture | Name | Date of establishment | Area, ha | Region |
|---|---|---|---|---|---|
| 1 | | Aksu-Zhabagly State Nature Reserve | 1926 | 131,934 | South Kazakhstan Region and Jambyl Region |
| 2 | | Almaty State Natural Reserve | 1931 | 71,700 | Almaty Region |
| 3 | | Naurzum State Nature Reserve | 1931 | 191,381 | Kostanay Region |
| 4 | | Barsakelmessky State Nature Reserve | 1939 | 160,826 | Kyzylorda Region |
| 5 | | Korgalzhyn State Nature Reserve | 1968 | 543,171 | Akmola Region and Karaganda region |
| 6 | | Markakolsky State Nature Reserve | 1976 | 102,979 | East Kazakhstan Region |
| 7 | | Ustyurt State Nature Reserve | 1984 | 223,342 | Mangystau Region |
| 8 | | West-Altai State Nature Reserve | 1992 | 86,122 | East Kazakhstan Region |
| 9 | | Alakol State Nature Reserve | 1998 | 65,217.9 | East Kazakhstan Region and East Kazakhstan Region |
| 10 | | Karatau State Nature Reserve | 2004 | 34,300 | South Kazakhstan Region |
