= Sonaly =

River in Kazakhstan

Sonaly Соналы
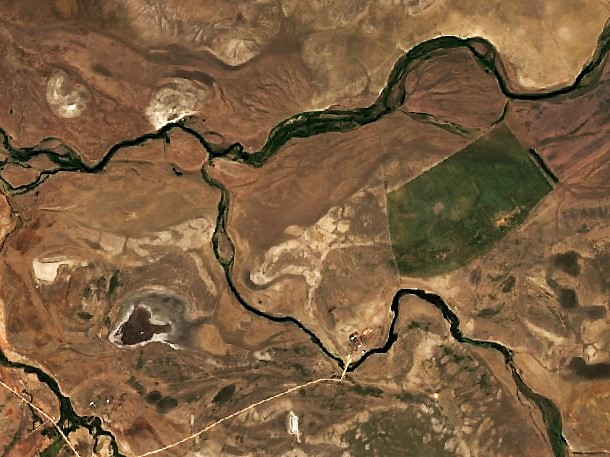
- Confluence of the Sonaly and the Kulanotpes (top) Sentinel-2 image

- Mouth location in Kazakhstan

Location
- Country: Kazakhstan

Physical characteristics
- Source: Amantau
  - coordinates: 48°58′14″N 71°16′30″E
  - elevation: ca 500 m (1,600 ft)
- Mouth: Kulanotpes
  - coordinates: 50°02′28″N 69°14′45″E
  - elevation: 340 m (1,120 ft)
- Length: 106 km (66 mi)
- Basin size: 334 km^{2} (129 sq mi)
- Discharge
  - average: 0.32 m^{3}/s (11 cu ft/s) (near the mouth)

Basin features
- Progression: Kulanotpes→Lake Tengiz

The Sonaly (Kazakh: Соналы) is a river in the Nura District, Karaganda Region, Kazakhstan. It has a length of 106 km (66 mi) and a drainage basin of 334 km^{2} (129 sq mi).

It is the second most important tributary of the Kulanotpes. Sonaly village is located 10 km (6.2 mi) upriver from its mouth.

== Course ==
The Sonaly river originates in the Amantau (Амантау), a small massif of the Kazakh Uplands. Its source is in the southeastern slopes, 106 km (66 mi) to the NNW of lake Shoshkakol. It heads first southwestwards and describes a wide arch bending westwards and northwestwards while still in its upper reaches. Then it heads roughly northwards all along its course. In its last stretch it bends northwestwards and joins the left bank of the Kulanotpes. The border of Korgalzhyn District, Akmola Region, stretches along the opposite bank.

The river valley is wide and its channel is bound by steep banks. In the summer the Sonaly usually stops flowing and splits into disconnected pools.

== See also ==
- List of rivers of Kazakhstan
