= Kertindi =

Kertindi Кертінді
- Selo
- Location in Kazakhstan
- Coordinates: 49°57′26″N 71°34′58″E
- Country: Kazakhstan
- Region: Karaganda Region

Population (2009)
  - Total: 1,020
- Postal code: 100915
- Area code: +7 72144

Kertindi (Kazakh: Кертінді, Russian: Кертинди, until 1999 - Kazgorodok) is a selo in the Nura District of the Karaganda Region in Kazakhstan. It is the administrative centre of the Kyzyltal Rural District.

== Geography ==
The selo is located on the right bank of the river Nura. The P-3 highway passes by the selo.

== Population ==
In the year 1999, the population of the selo was 1535 people (797 men and 738 women). According to the 2009 census, 1020 people lived in the village (528 men and 492 women).
