= Baitugan (Karaganda Region) =

Baitugan Байтуған
- Selo
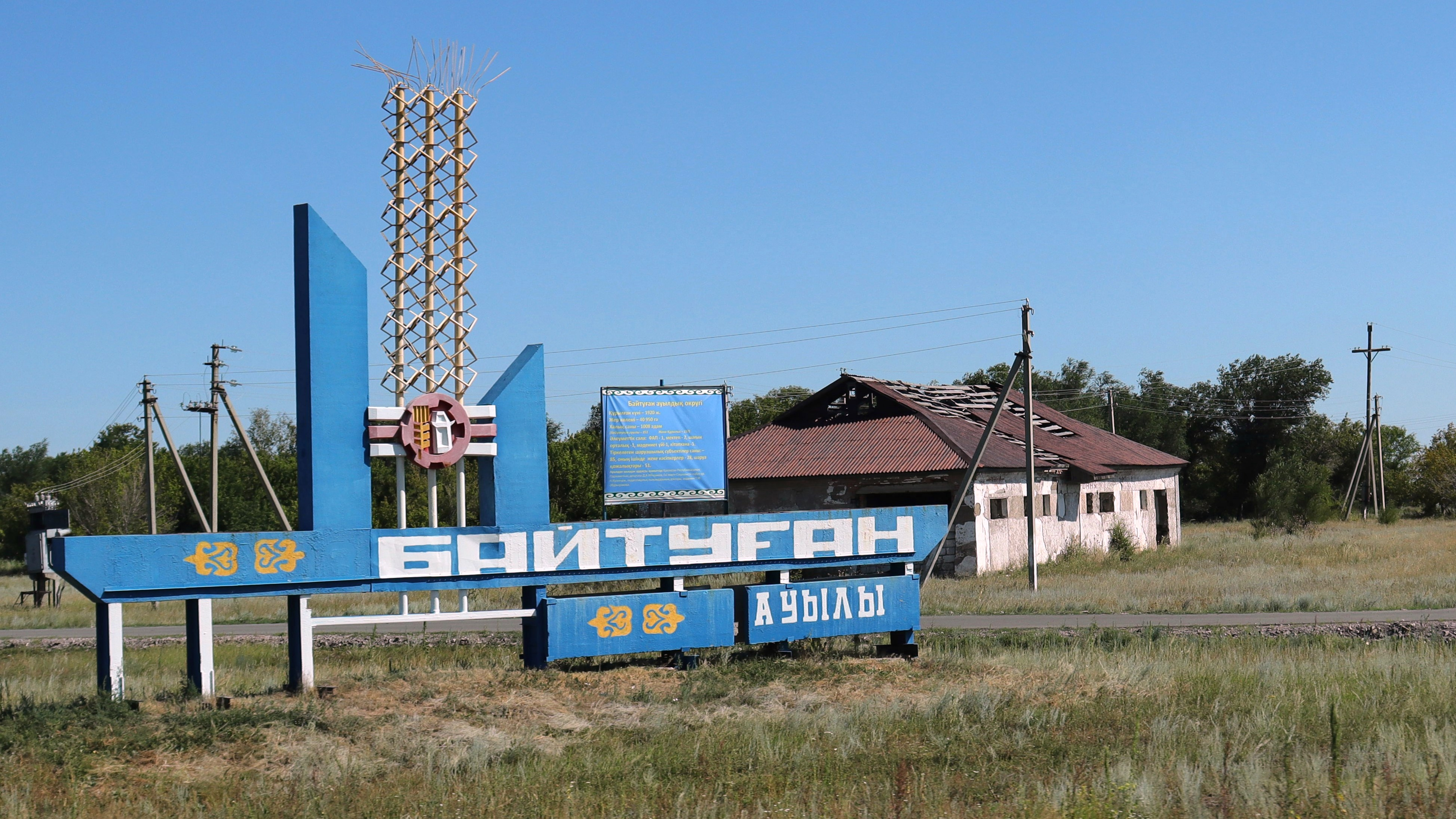
- Entry into Baitugan

- Location in Kazakhstan
- Coordinates: 50°21′51″N 71°26′50″E
- Country: Kazakhstan
- Region: Karaganda Region

Population (2009)
  - Total: 1,052
- Postal code: 100905
- Area code: +7 72144

Baitugan (Kazakh: Байтуған, Russian: Байтуган) is a selo in the Nura District of the Karaganda Region in Kazakhstan. It is the administrative centre of the Baitugan Rural District. It is located approximately 13 km to the north-west of the district capital, the town of Nura.

== History ==
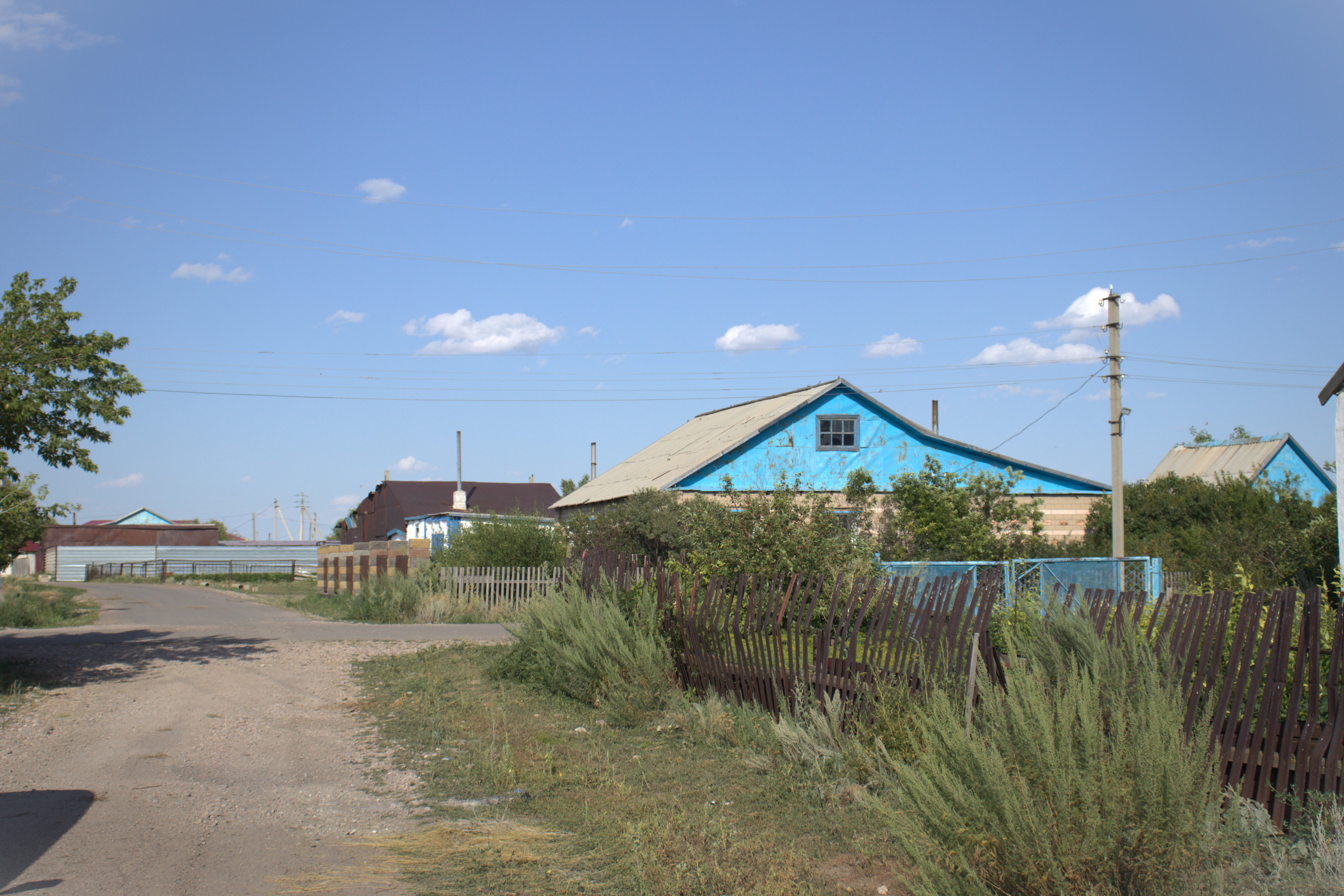
A street in Baitugan

Founded in 1920 as Novokarpovka. In June 1921, the village council conducted the first census of Novokarpovites. 32 houses and 204 residents were registered. In 1930 it was incorporated into the Nura District and on March 10, 1932, it was incorporated as a part of the Karaganda Region. On February 10, 1935, the Novokarpovsky Council was created.

In the beginning of 1930, the villagers of Novokarpovka created a kolkhoz and named it in honor of F.I. Goloshchekin.

In November 1935, Novokarpovka was renamed to Put' Lenina. And according to the report for 1936, there were 439 people on the kolkhoz and 105 households were inhabited. The kolkhoz had 5320 hectares of land.

A total of 82 people from the village went to the Great Patriotic War, from which more than 20 people returned disabled.

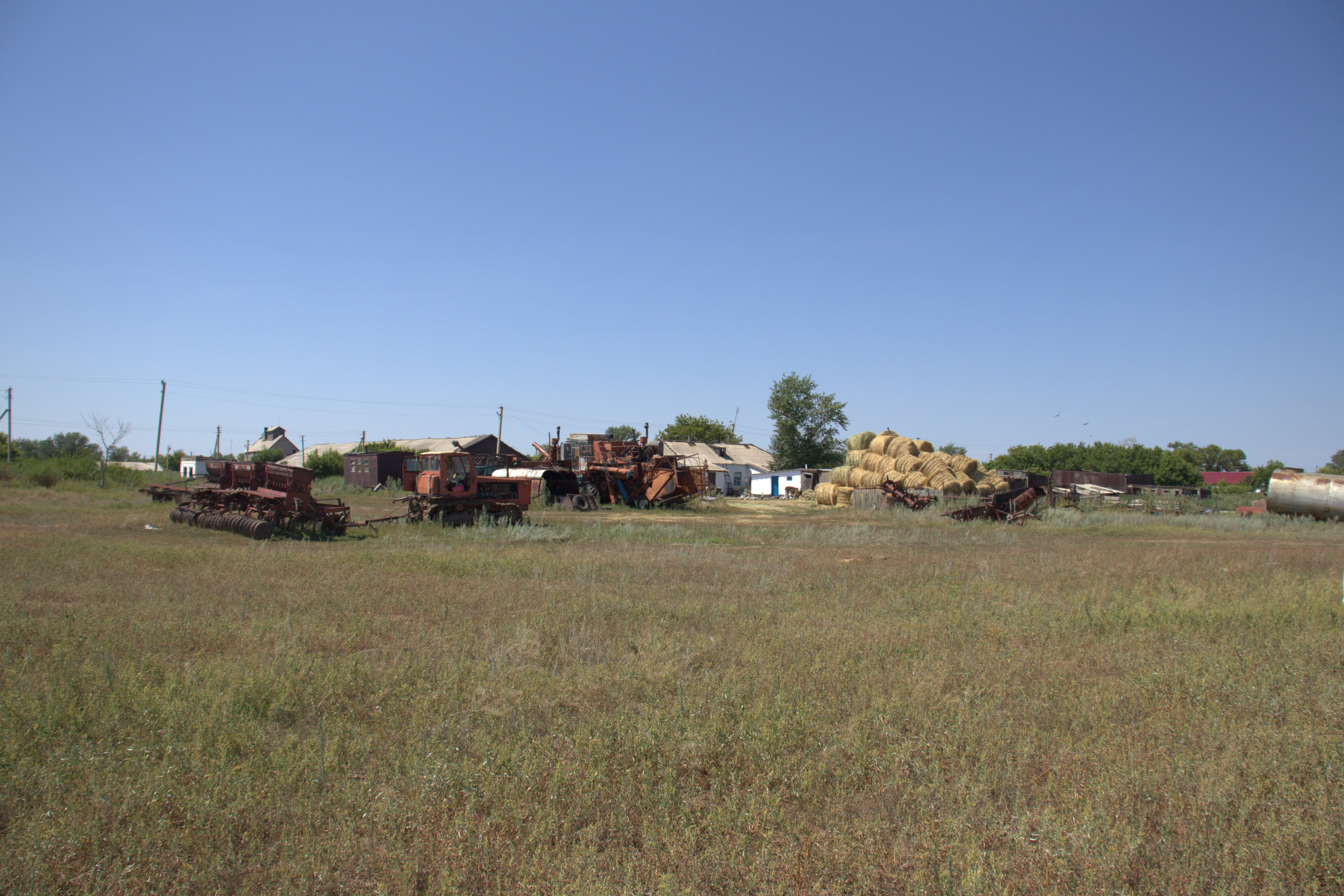
Machinery and houses in Baitugan

On November 2, 1950, the Put' Lenina kolhoz merged with the neighboring farm 'Zhana Kurulys' and the 'Kulan Otpes' farm.

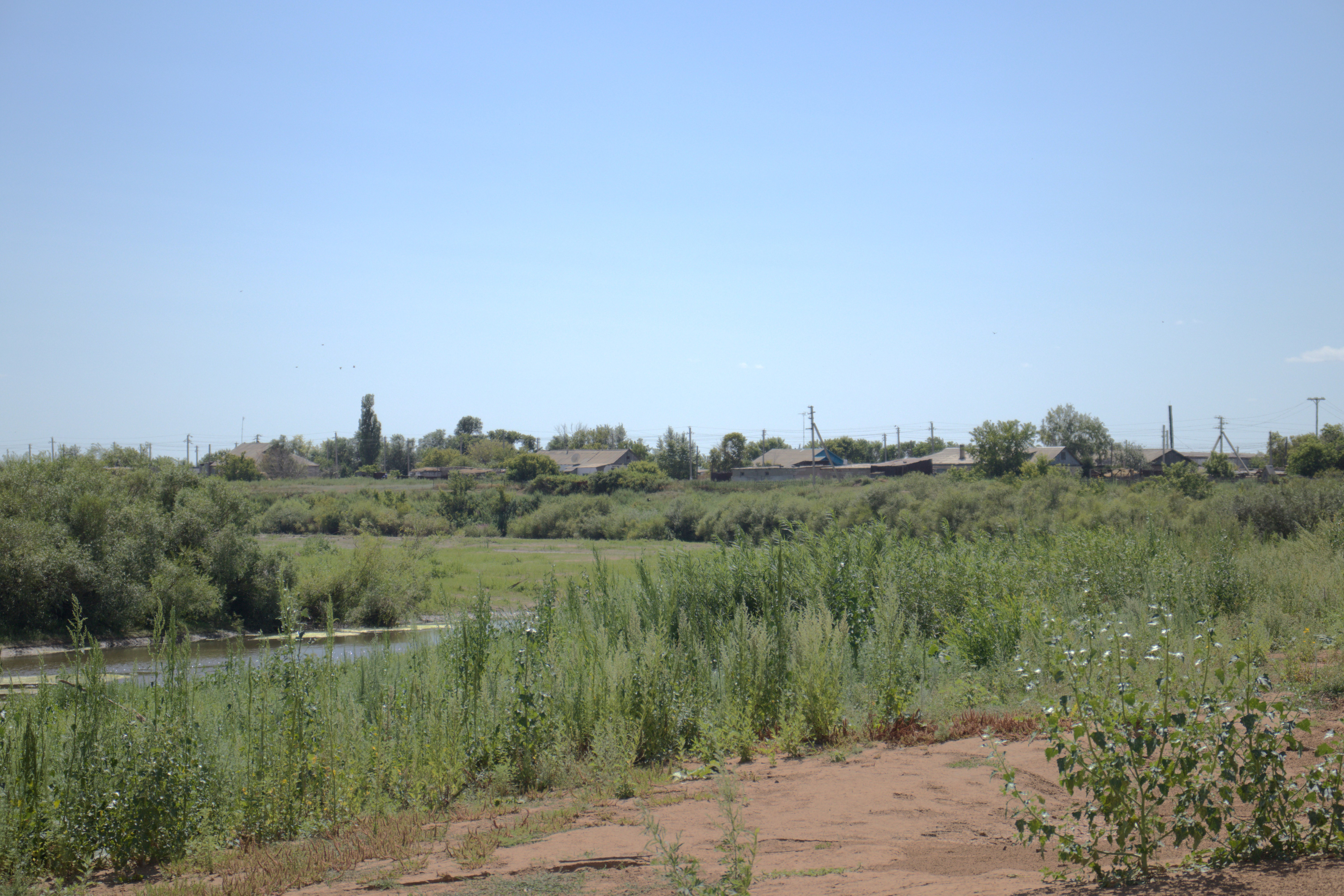
The Nura River and houses in Baitugan

In 1954, a new school was built. During the same period (1954–1956), a club, a banya, a bakery, a cowshed, and sheep sheds were built in the kolkhoz.

In 1959, 25 houses, a poultry house, a dormitory were built, and the foundation for a workshop was laid. By 1960, the kolkhoz had 466 able-bodied people. In the same year, evacuees from Belarus arrived.

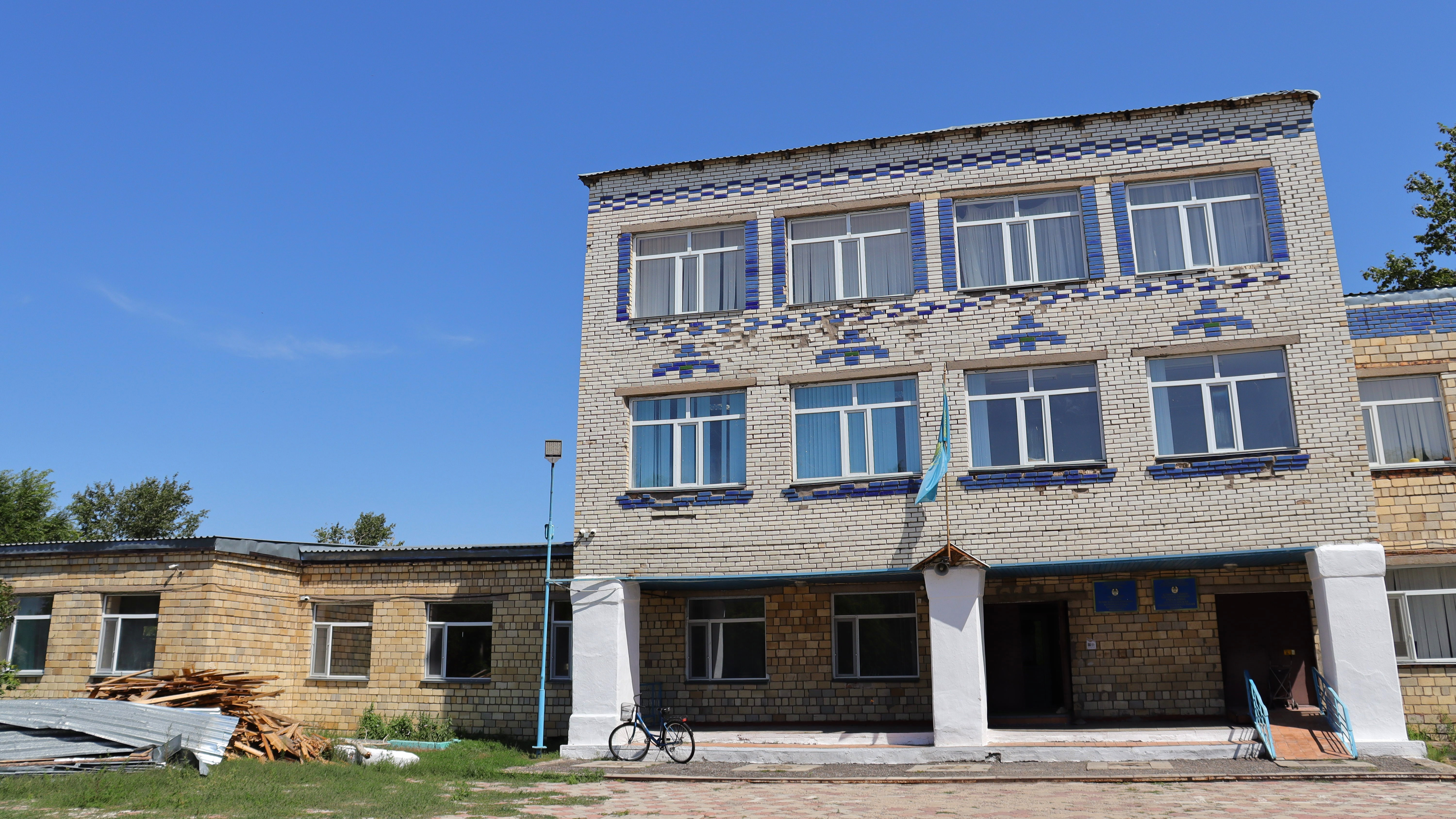
The school in Baitugan

On February 15, 1961, the general meeting of the Put' Lenina collective farm decided to join the sovkhoz.

In the eighties, a school for 464 students, a shopping center with a catering unit, hotel rooms, a consumer service point, a village council building, a production office, a communications house, a cultural center for 300 places and a clinic for 100 visits per shift with a mud bath and a gym were built.

In 1989, the state farm "Put' Lenina" split into a number of farms: PC "Kulager", PH "Baitugan" and LLP "Zhana Zhol". The rest were divided into 75 small villager farms.

== Population ==
In the year 1999, the population of the village was 1,359 people (688 men and 671 women). According to the 2009 census, 1052 people lived in the village (524 men and 528 women).
