= Baitugan Rural District =

Baitugan Rural District Байтуған ауылдық округі
- Rural district
- Country: Kazakhstan
- Region: Karaganda Region

Population (2021)
  - Total: 938

The Baitugan Rural District (Kazakh: Байтуған ауылдық округі, Russian: Байтуганский сельский округ) is a rural district in the Nura District in the Karaganda Region of Kazakhstan. Its administrative centre is the village of Baitugan.

In 1989, instead of the Baitugan Rural District, there was the Novokarpovsky Rural District (the villages of Baitugan, Zhanakurylys, Karaoi). Later, the village of Karaoi formed the separate Karaoi Rural District. Until 2018, the district was called the Novokarpovsky Rural District.

== Population ==
| Settlement | Population (1989) | Population (1999) | Population (2009) | Population (2021) |
|---|---|---|---|---|
| Baitugan (village) | 1472 | 1359 | 1052 | 823 |
| Zhanakurylys (village) | 294 | 309 | 245 | 115 |
