= Korgalzhyn (lake) =

Lake in Kazakhstan

- Қорғалжын
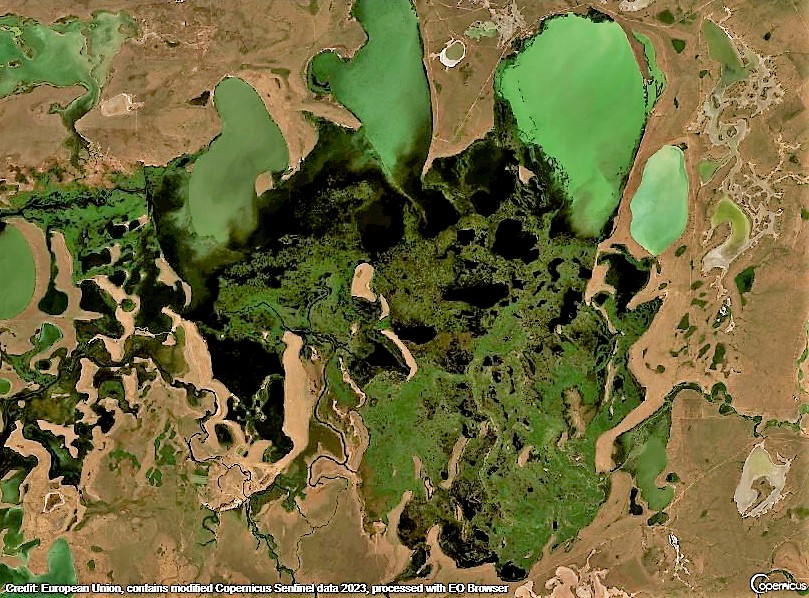
- Korgalzhyn Sentinel-2 image in June

- Location within Kazakhstan
- Location: Kazakh Uplands
- Coordinates: 50°25′05″N 69°31′23″E
- Type: endorheic
- Primary inflows: Nura
- Primary outflows: Nura
- Catchment area: 55,000 square kilometers (21,000 sq mi)
- Basin countries: Kazakhstan
- Max. length: 33 kilometers (21 mi)
- Max. width: 21 kilometers (13 mi)
- Surface area: 330 square kilometers (130 sq mi)
- Average depth: 1.6 meters (5 ft 3 in)
- Max. depth: 2 meters (6 ft 7 in)
- Shore length^{1}: 187 kilometers (116 mi)
- Surface elevation: 307.5 meters (1,009 ft)
- Islands: ca 40
- ^{1} Shore length is not a well-defined measure.

Designations

Ramsar Wetland
- Official name: Kourgaldzhin and Tengiz Lakes
- Designated: 11 October 1976
- Reference no.: 107

Korgalzhyn (Kazakh: Қорғалжын; Russian: Кургальджин) is a lake in Korgalzhyn District, Akmola Region, Kazakhstan. Korgalzhyn is the main body of water of the Korgalzhyn group of lakes, which includes Birtaban, Sholakshalkar, Shalkar, Zhanybekshalkar, Uialyshalkar and Zhandyshalkar.

Korgalzhyn is one of the main lakes of the Tengiz-Korgalzhyn Depression. The lake is part of the Korgalzhyn Nature Reserve, a 237,100 hectares (586,000 acres) protected area. It is also an Important Bird Area and Ramsar site with its wetlands and mostly muddy waterways which are the breeding site of 318 bird species, including 22 endangered birds.

== Geography ==
Korgalzhyn is a lake that lies at the bottom of the large Tengiz-Korgalzhyn Depression, close to the southeast of larger Lake Tengiz. Lake Sholakshalkar lies to the east. The lake is shallow, with a maximum depth of 2 meters (6 ft 7 in). Most of it is covered by reeds, except for a few lobes in the northwest and northeast, Kokai, Sultankeldy and Isey, where the surface is relatively free of vegetation. The northern and eastern shorelines are steep and rocky, reaching heights between 4 and 6 meters (13–20 ft), while the western and southern shores are gently sloping and overgrown with aquatic vegetation. The lake bottom is flat and clayey, covered with dark grey silt.

The Nura river flows into the eastern lakeshore from the northeast. During spring floods the overflow discharges into lake Tengiz from the northwestern end. River Kulanotpes flows along the western edge of Korgalzhyn. The water of the lake is fresh near the mouth of the Nura, becoming increasingly brackish towards the northern sector.

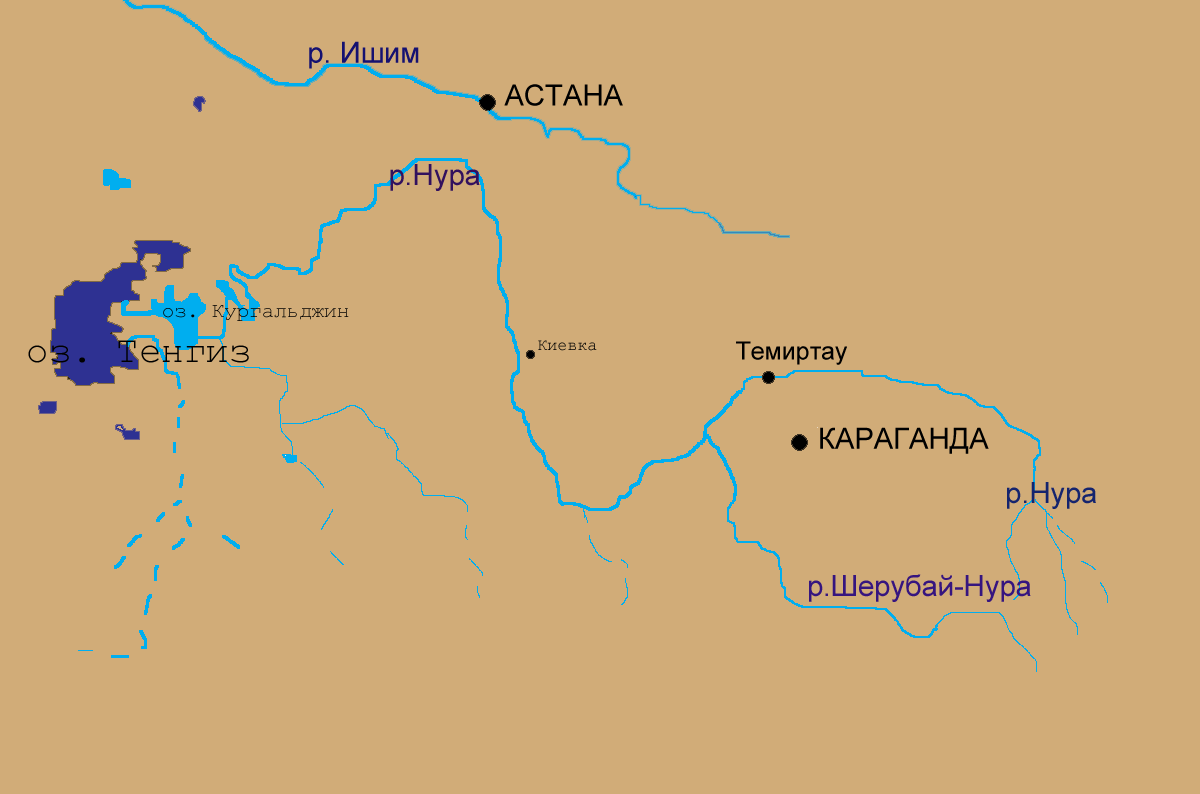
Course of the Nura with Korgalzhyn in pale blue.

== Flora and fauna ==
There are large reed beds scattered on mud islands almost completely covering the southern part with a mesh of open channels and ponds in between. Owing to these mud islands Korgalzhyn is an important wetland site for migratory water birds, such as different species of gulls, terns, ducks and grebes, including the northernmost colony of greater flamingo. The reed thickets also provide a habitat for the wild boar.

Unlike barren neighboring lake Tengiz, Korgalzhyn is abundant in fish fauna. The main species in the lake are crucian carp, mirror carp, tench, ide, pike and perch.

== See also ==
- List of lakes of Kazakhstan
- Saryarka – Steppe and Lakes of Northern Kazakhstan
