= Kulanotpes =

River in Kazakhstan

Kulanotpes Құланөтпес
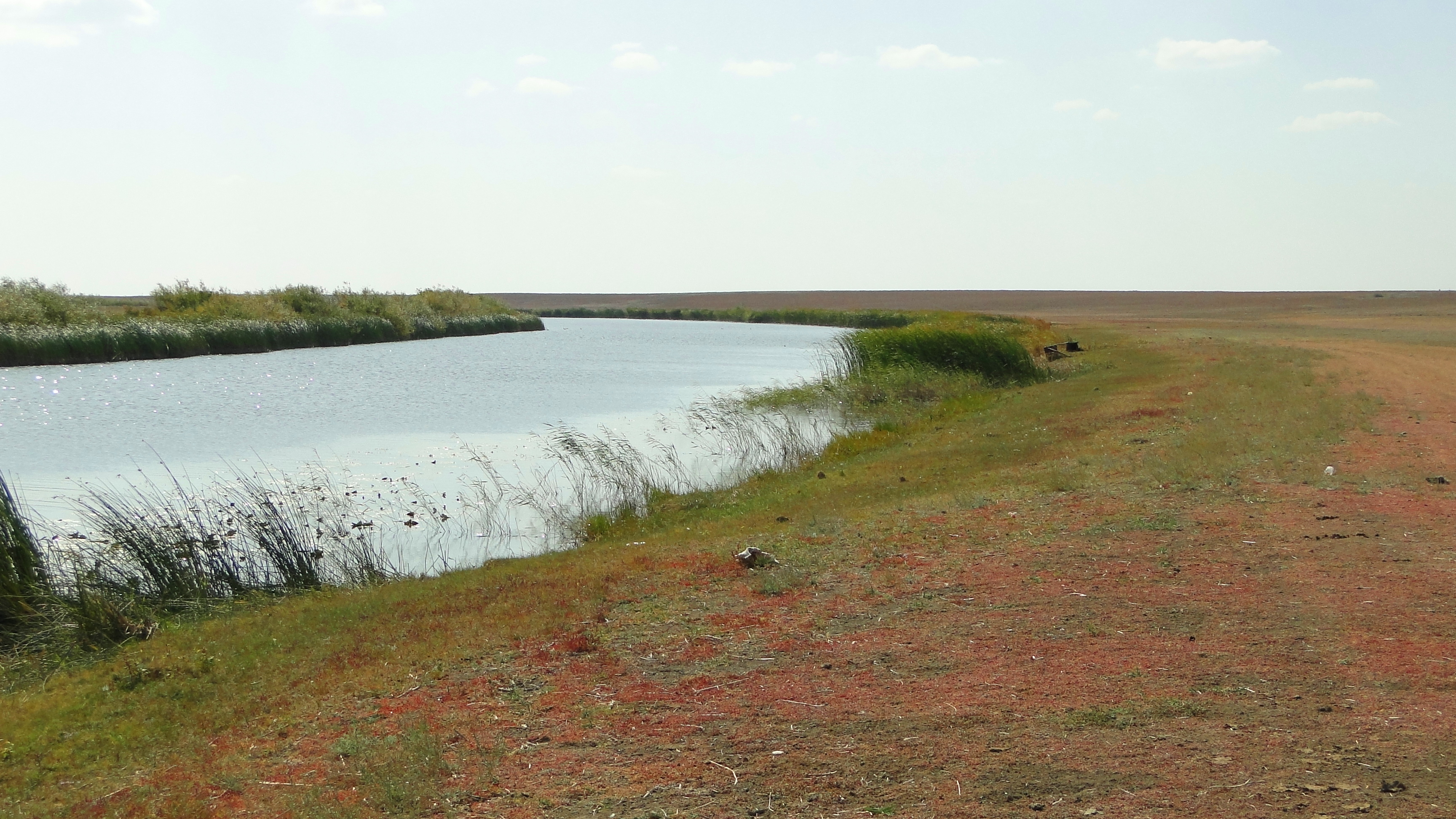
- Panorama of the Kulanotpes in its lower course.

- Mouth location in Kazakhstan

Location
- Country: Kazakhstan

Physical characteristics
- Source: Aigyrzhal
  - coordinates: 48°58′14″N 71°16′30″E
  - elevation: 606 m (1,988 ft)
- Mouth: Lake Tengiz
  - coordinates: 50°20′35″N 69°14′45″E
  - elevation: 305 m (1,001 ft)
- Length: 364 km (226 mi)
- Basin size: 25,900 km^{2} (10,000 sq mi)
- Discharge
  - average: 3 m^{3}/s (110 cu ft/s) (near Nygman)

The Kulanotpes (Kazakh: Құланөтпес; Russian: Куланотпес) is a river in the Nura District, Karaganda Region, Kazakhstan. It has a length of 364 km (226 mi) and a drainage basin of 25,900 km^{2} (10,000 sq mi).

It is the second most important river flowing into Lake Tengiz. There are a number of villages near its banks, including Kaynar, Kenzharak, Orazal, Kulanotpes, Kosaral, Kaskatau and Nygman. The mouth area of the Kulanotpes is part of the Korgalzhyn Nature Reserve, a protected area.

== Course ==
The Kulanotpes river originates in the Aigyrzhal (Айғыржал) range of the Kazakh Uplands. Its source is in the northeastern slopes, near Aymysyk in the Ulytau Region. It heads roughly northwestwards, with many bends and turns. The river meanders strongly in its lower course section to the west of the Nura. In its last stretch it bends westwards and again northwards, along the western end of lake Korgalzhyn, and crossing the border of Korgalzhyn District, Akmola Region. Finally it flows into Lake Tengiz from the east near its southernmost shores.

There is a bridge crossing the river near Nygman and another further upstream. The water of the river is soft and drinkable when the river flows in the spring. In the summer and in periods of drought the flow stops and the riverbed dries along most of its length, except for scattered pools. The river is fed mainly by snow and rainwater. There are a number of lakes in its basin, such as Izendi, Karatomar, Alabaital, Tuzkol, Alabas and Zharlykol. The main tributaries of the Kulanotpes are Kulshin, Ermek, Surteke, the 160 km (99 mi) long Kon, Karaozek, Kazygurt and the 106 km (66 mi) long Sonaly.

== Flora and fauna ==
The Kulanotpes is rich in fish, including pike, perch, crucian carp, carp and white bream. Reeds grow on certain stretches of the riverbank, providing a habitat for ducks and woodcocks, among other birds.

== See also ==
- List of rivers of Kazakhstan
