= Nura, Nura District =

Nura Нұра
- Village
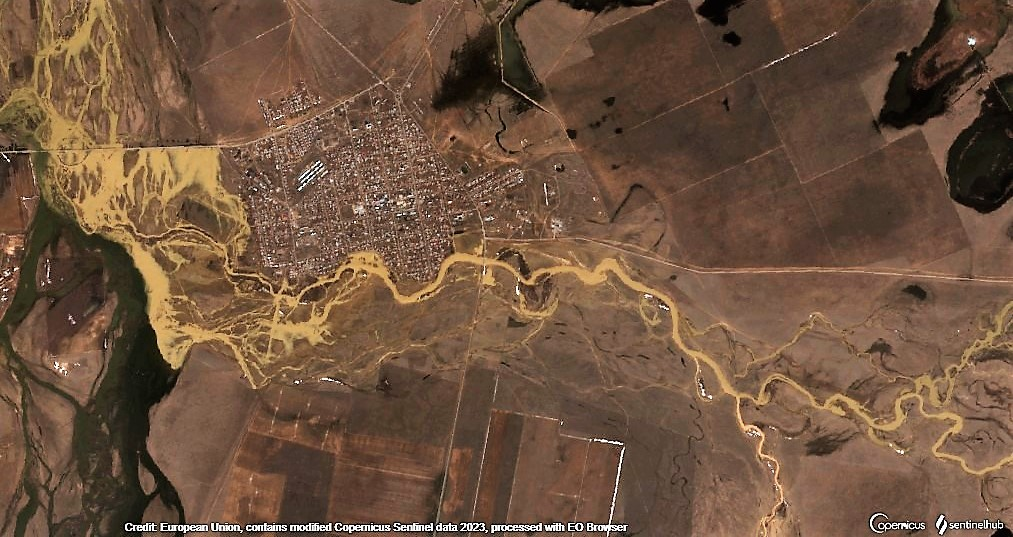
- View of Nura

- Location in Kazakhstan
- Coordinates: 50°15′46″N 71°33′10″E
- Country: Kazakhstan
- Region: Karaganda Region
- District: Nura District
- Settled: 1898
- Elevation: 1,293 ft (394 m)

Population (2009)
  - Total: 5,956
- Time zone: UTC+05:00 (Kazakhstan Time)
- Postcode: 100900

Nura (Kazakh: Нұра), until 2017 Kievka, is a village in Karaganda Region, Kazakhstan. It is the administrative center of the Nura District (KATO code 355230100). The settlement was established in 1898 and since 1928, it has been the district center. Population: 5,956 (2009 census results); 6,807 (1999 census results).

== Geography ==
Nura is located by the Ulken Kundyzdy river, close to its confluence with the Nura. It lies 165 kilometers (103 mi) to the northwest of Karaganda city and 90 kilometers (56 mi) southwest of Sarybel railway station (formerly Osakarovka), on the Karaganda — Astana line.
