= Tselinograd District =

Coordinates: 51°10′N 71°26′E

Tselinograd
- District
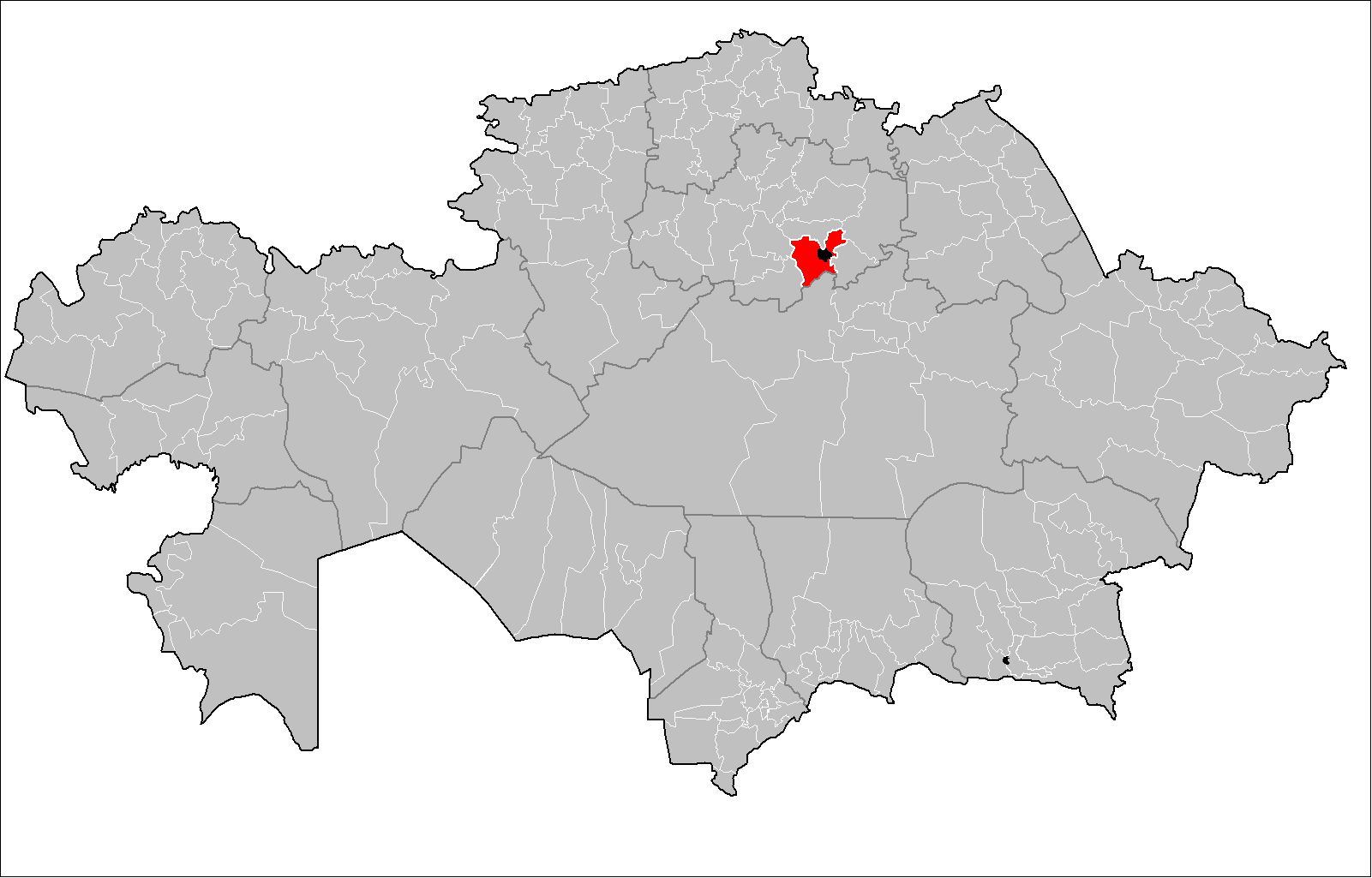
- Country: Kazakhstan
- Region: Akmola Region
- Founded: 1936

Government
  - Akim: Daryn Sabyrgali

Area
  - Total: 3,046 sq mi (7,888 km^{2})

Population (2013)
  - Total: 60,505
- Time zone: UTC+6 (East)

Tselinograd District (Kazakh: Целиноград ауданы, Tselinograd audany) is the district that surrounds the city and country capital of Astana in northern Kazakhstan. The administrative center of the district is the selo of Akmol. Population: 58,350 (2009 census results); 42,068 (1999 census results). The district is under the control of Akmola Region.
