= Zhanakurylys (Karaganda Region) =

Zhanakurylys Жаңақұрылыс
- Selo
- Jañaqurylys
- Location in Kazakhstan
- Coordinates: 50°16′54″N 71°21′28″E
- Country: Kazakhstan
- Region: Karaganda Region

Population (2009)
  - Total: 245

Zhanakurylys (Kazakh: Жаңақұрылыс) is a village in the Nura District of the Karaganda Region in Kazakhstan. It is a part of the Baitugan Rural District.

== Population ==
In the year 1999, the population of the village was 309 people (158 men and 151 women). According to the 2009 census, there were 245 people (121 men and 124 women).
