= Qarakolboldy =

- Qarakulboldy
- Location within Kazakhstan

Highest point
- Elevation: 1,083 m (3,553 ft)
- Prominence: 285 m (935 ft)
- Coordinates: 49°23′24″N 74°44′46″E

Dimensions
- Length: 5 km (3.1 mi)
- Width: 2.5 km (1.6 mi)

Geography
- Country: Kazakhstan

Qarakolboldy or Qarakulboldy (Kazakh: Қаракөлболды) is a mountain in the Kyzyltas mountain range, north of Hanqashty mountain.

== Geography ==
The mountain is located in the west of the Karkaraly District of the Karaganda Region, 4 km north of the source of the Nura River. It stretches for 5 km from northeast to southwest, is 2.5 km wide, and its highest point is 1083 m.

== Geology ==
Formed from Carboniferous and Permian granite.

== See also ==
- Geography of Kazakhstan
- Shunkyrkudyk
