= Kypshak =

Salt lake in Kazakhstan

- Қыпшақ / Әжібайсор
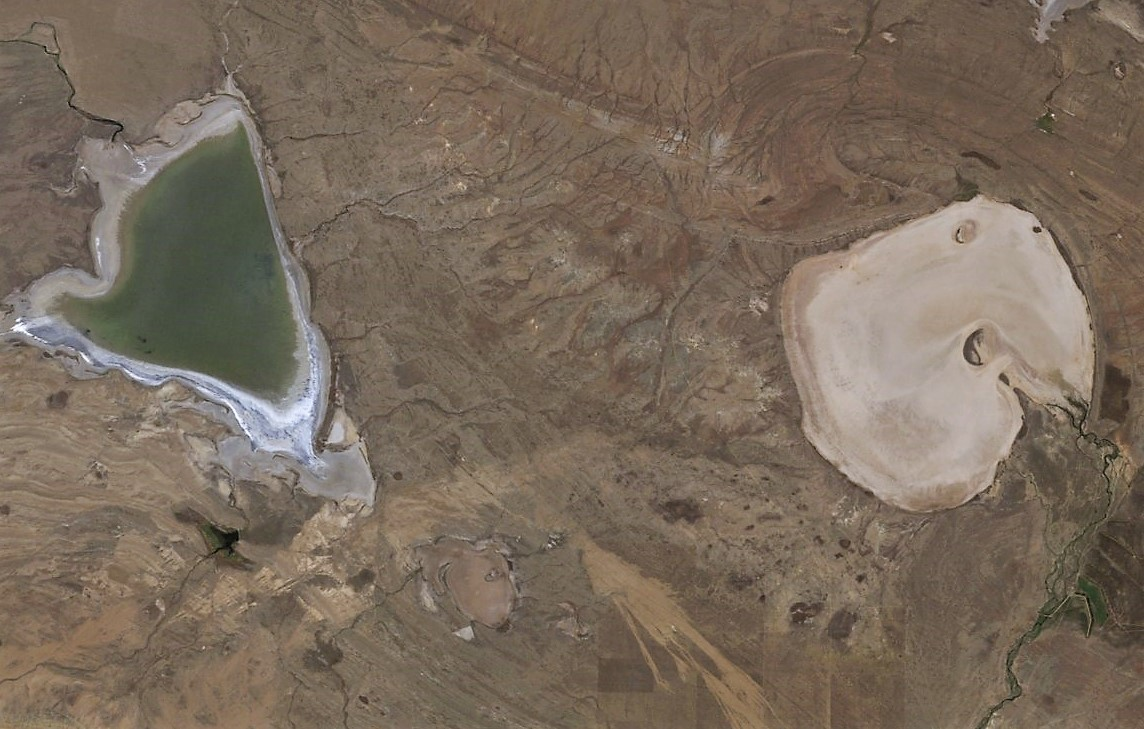
- 2011 Landsat-5 image of lakes Kypshak (left) and Kerey

- Location within Kazakhstan
- Location: Kazakh Uplands
- Coordinates: 50°08′N 68°23′E
- Type: endorheic
- Primary inflows: Kypshak, Akkoshkar
- Primary outflows: none
- Catchment area: 3,151 square kilometers (1,217 sq mi)
- Basin countries: Kazakhstan
- Max. length: 10.5 kilometers (6.5 mi)
- Max. width: 8.5 kilometers (5.3 mi)
- Surface area: 64.7 square kilometers (25.0 sq mi)
- Shore length^{1}: 37.2 kilometers (23.1 mi)
- Surface elevation: 318.9 meters (1,046 ft)
- Islands: none
- ^{1} Shore length is not a well-defined measure.

Kypshak (Kazakh: Қыпшақ), also known as Azhibeksor (Kazakh: Әжібайсор; Russian: Ажибексор), is a salt lake in Nura District, Karaganda Region, Kazakhstan.

In the 1930s Kypshak dried up and turned into a salt pan, but in the following decades it filled up once more and on the USSR topographic map of 1989 it was marked again as a lake.

== Geography ==
Kypshak is a roughly triangular-shaped lake that lies at 318.9 meters (1,046 ft) above sea level. It is located 23 kilometers (14 mi) to the southwest of Lake Tengiz and 12 kilometers (7.5 mi) to the west of lake Kerey. It is an endorheic lake, having no outflow. 111 kilometers (69 mi) long river Kypshak flows into the lake from the northwest, and smaller river Akkoshkar from the west.

== See also ==
- Sor (geomorphology)
- List of lakes of Kazakhstan
