= Rodionovka =

Rodionovka Родионовка
- Selo
- Location within Amur Oblast Location within Russia
- Coordinates: 50°01′N 129°46′E
- Country: Russia
- Region: Amur Oblast
- District: Bureysky District
- Time zone: UTC+9:00

Rodionovka (Russian: Родионовка) is a rural locality (a selo) in Rodionovsky Selsoviet of Bureysky District, Amur Oblast, Russia. The population was 249 as of 2018. There are 7 streets.

== Geography ==
Rodionovka is located on R297 highway, 31 km north of Novobureysky (the district's administrative centre) by road. Semyonovka is the nearest rural locality.
