= Esengeldi, Akmola Region =

Coordinates: 50°59′N 68°42′E

Esengeldi (Kazakh: Есенкелді, Esenkeldı), previously until 2001 Ladyzhenka, is a town in the Akmola Region in Kazakhstan. It is located about 120 miles south-west of Astana, about 650 miles north-west of Almaty, and 660 miles south-west of Novosibirsk, Russia.
