= Kerey (lake) =

Lake in Kazakhstan

- Керей
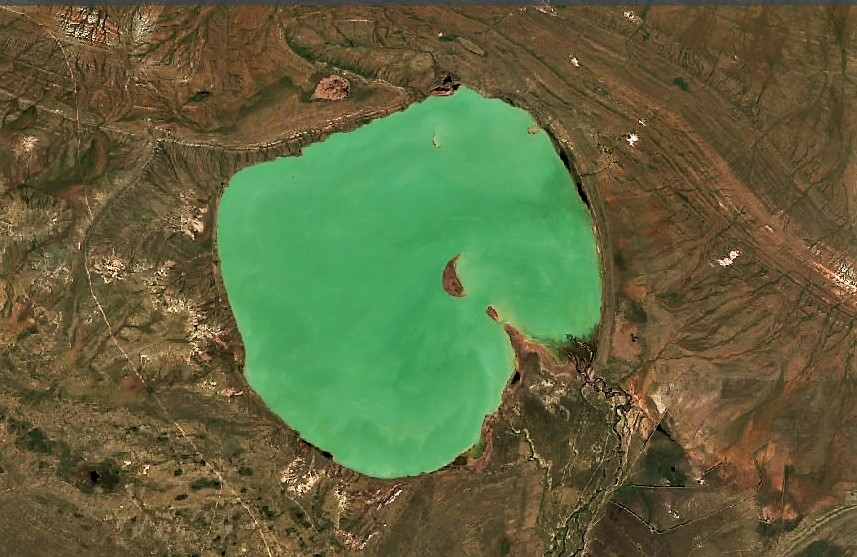
- Sentinel-2 image of lake Kerey

- Location within Kazakhstan
- Location: Kazakh Uplands
- Coordinates: 50°07′39″N 68°42′17″E
- Type: endorheic
- Primary inflows: Kerey river
- Primary outflows: none
- Catchment area: 3,680 square kilometers (1,420 sq mi)
- Basin countries: Kazakhstan
- Max. length: 9.6 kilometers (6.0 mi)
- Max. width: 8.4 kilometers (5.2 mi)
- Surface area: 62.8 square kilometers (24.2 sq mi)
- Average depth: 0.4 meters (1 ft 4 in)
- Shore length^{1}: 37.2 kilometers (23.1 mi)
- Surface elevation: 312 meters (1,024 ft)
- Islands: one
- ^{1} Shore length is not a well-defined measure.

Kerey (Kazakh: Керей) is a salt lake in Nura District, Karaganda Region, Kazakhstan.

The lake lies in the northwestern sector of the district. The nearest inhabited locality is Zhanbobek (Жанбөбек) located 27 kilometers (17 mi) to the SSE of the southern shore.

== Geography ==
Kerey is a roughly kidney-shaped lake that lies at 312 meters (1,024 ft) above sea level. It is located 6 kilometers (3.7 mi) to the southwest of the southern shore of Lake Tengiz, 12 kilometers (7.5 mi) to the east of lake Kypshak and 31 kilometers (19 mi) to the WNW of lake Kiyakty. The 100 kilometers (62 mi) long Kerey river flows from the south into the southeastern shore.

Kerey is shallow and its shores are marshy. It is an endorheic lake, having no outflow. A short spit projecting from the southeastern side divides the southern shore into two bays. There is a small island off the spit. Kerey is fed with snow, precipitation and groundwater. Its water level is usually at its highest in April and at its lowest in September. In years of drought the lake may dry up.

== See also ==
- Sor (geomorphology)
- List of lakes of Kazakhstan
