= Zhantayev Tolepbek =

1. REDIRECT Draft:Zhantayev Tolepbek
