= Korgalzhyn Nature Reserve =

Protected area in Kazakhstan

Korgalzhyn State Nature Reserve
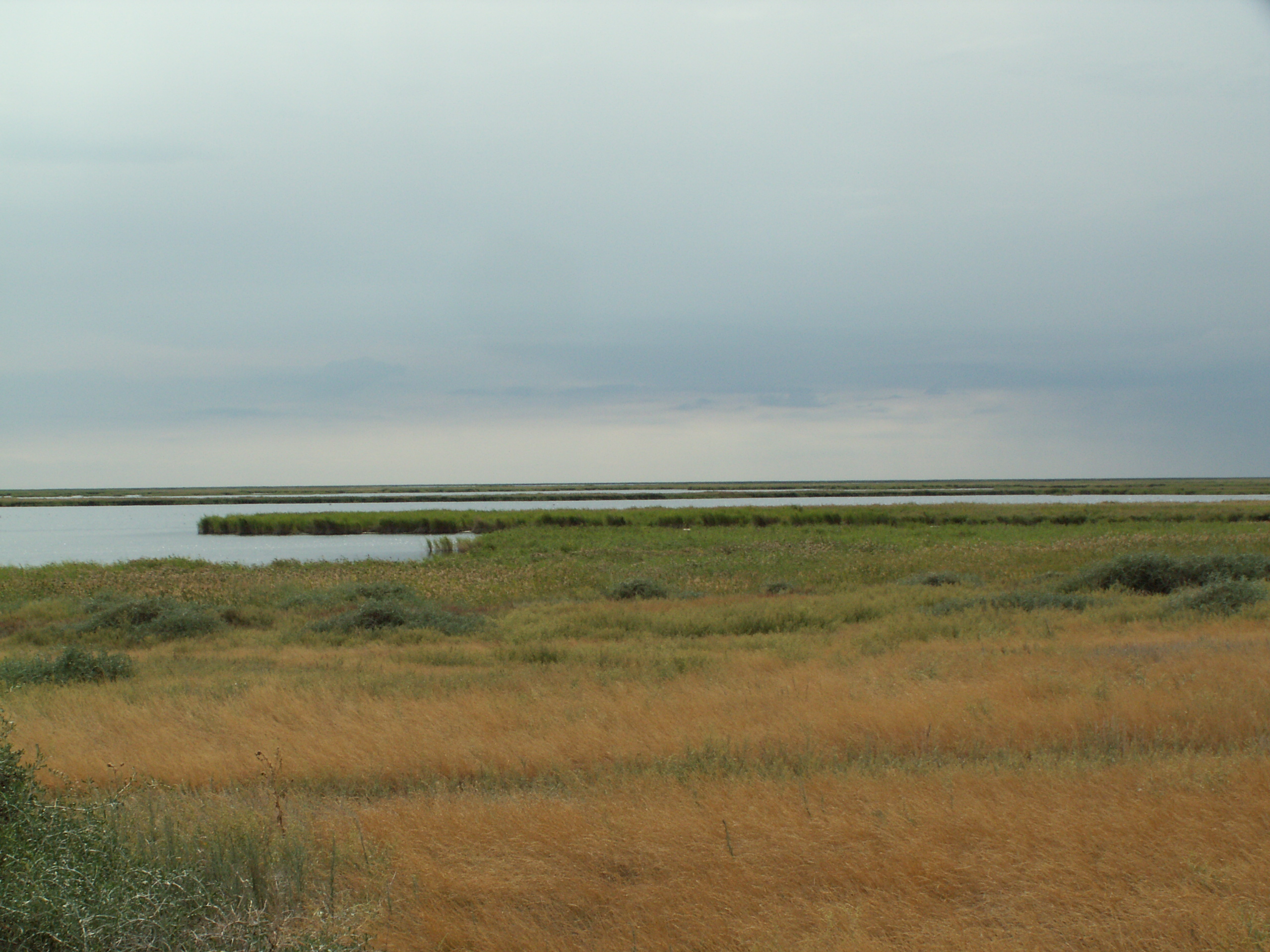

- Location within Kazakhstan
- Location: Akmola Region and Karaganda Region, Kazakhstan
- Nearest city: Astana
- Coordinates: 50°26′00″N 69°11′20″E
- Area: 5,431.71 km^{2} (1,342,200 acres)
- Established: 1968
- World Heritage site: 2008

Ramsar Wetland
- Official name: Kourgaldzhin and Tengiz Lakes
- Designated: 11 October 1976
- Reference no.: 107

Korgalzhyn State Nature Reserve (Kazakh: Қорғалжын мемлекеттік табиғи қорығы, Qorğaljyn memlekettık tabiği qoryğy) is a protected area in Aqmola and Karaganda regions of Kazakhstan, located west of the city of Astana. It is part of the UNESCO heritage site Saryarka – Steppe and Lakes of Northern Kazakhstan, Ramsar site and biosphere reserve.

The nature reserve is located in the steppe of central Kazakhstan, of the Indian and Siberian-East African migration routes of migratory birds and an important wetland of international importance. Extensive reserve waters provide the necessary living space in the largest Asian population of wetland birds.

== Geography ==
Korgalzhyn State nature reserve has an area of 543,171 hectares (1,342,200 acres). The territory is located in the steppes and semi deserts of the Kazakh Uplands. It includes numerous salt and fresh water bodies. The main rivers are the Nura and Kulanotpes, and the biggest lake is Lake Tengiz, followed by Korgalzhyn, after which the nature reserve is named. Other lakes of the protected area are Kerey, Kypshak, Asaubalyk, Zhamankol, Zhabay Tabankazy, Manat, Saumalkol and Toktamys.

== History ==
In 1976 Tengis - Korgalzhyn lakes have been included in the Ramsar list of wetlands of international importance. Vingue lake tengiz, as its shores, had never been exposed to anthropogenic impact, this lake in 2000a goal was included in the list of the international organization "Living Lakes", which includes the most unique lakes in the world in 2007, the area has also become part of worldwide network of places recognized as extremely valuable for the conservation of birds(IBA). In 2008 Korgalzhyn State Nature as part of the nomination "Saryarka- Steppe and Lake of Northern Kazakhstan" is included in the list of World Natural Heritage UNESKO. In 2012 Reserve UNESCO recognized as the first Biosphere Reserve in the Republic of Kazakhstan .

== Flora ==
In general, the biodiversity of the protected area includes more than 500 species of plant (a quarter of the entire Flora of Kazakh Upland) and more than 1400 species of aquatic and terrestrial animals, including 43 species of mammals, 350 species of birds (including nesting species -12). Wetland birds in the Tengiz-Korgalzhyn lake consists of 112 species, representing 87% of the wetland avifauna Kazakhstan. Also found here 2 species of amphibian, 4 species of reptiles, 14 species of fish. Insects are currently over 700 known species, although their diversity can reach more than 3000 species.

The steppe area is also important as a place of preservation of unique reference sites of natural steppe ecosystems subjected to degradation in other parts of Kazakhstan in its various degrees. Steppe ecosystems are habitats of conventional, as well as endemic, rare and endangered species.

== Fauna ==
The protected reserve territory is home to more than 60 species of animals and plants listed in the Red Book. For example, 41 species in the list of International Union for Conservation of Nature (IUCN). On the lakes, 10% of the global population of Dalmatian pelicans and up to 10–20% of the world population of the territory of food during the summer and autumn moult migration in belayet huge number of birds, tens of thousands of geese, hundred of thousands of dabbling and diving ducks and waders. Among the Red Book species of steppe and around water areas should be nofel steppe sandpiper sociable lapwing, bustard, little bustard, booted eagle, steppe eagle, white tailed eagle, pallid harrier, steppe pustelku, Demoiselle crane and others. 8 species of mammals included in the, including souga and marmot IUCN. The Red Book of Kazakhstan listed 5 plants species, including tulip schrenka, which is of great importance as a reserve fund of material selection. This species is the ancestor of some cultivated varieties of tulips bred in the Netherlands in the XVl Century. Preserving the natural state sites on its territory and adjacent areas is the main objective of the Korgalzhyn Nature Reserve. The wetlands are home to pelicans, cranes and the northernmost population of greater flamingos. Altogether there are more than 300 bird species in the reserve. The steppes of the reserve are home to wolves, saiga antelopes and bobak marmots.
