= Lake Tengiz =

Tengiz
- Теңіз көлі
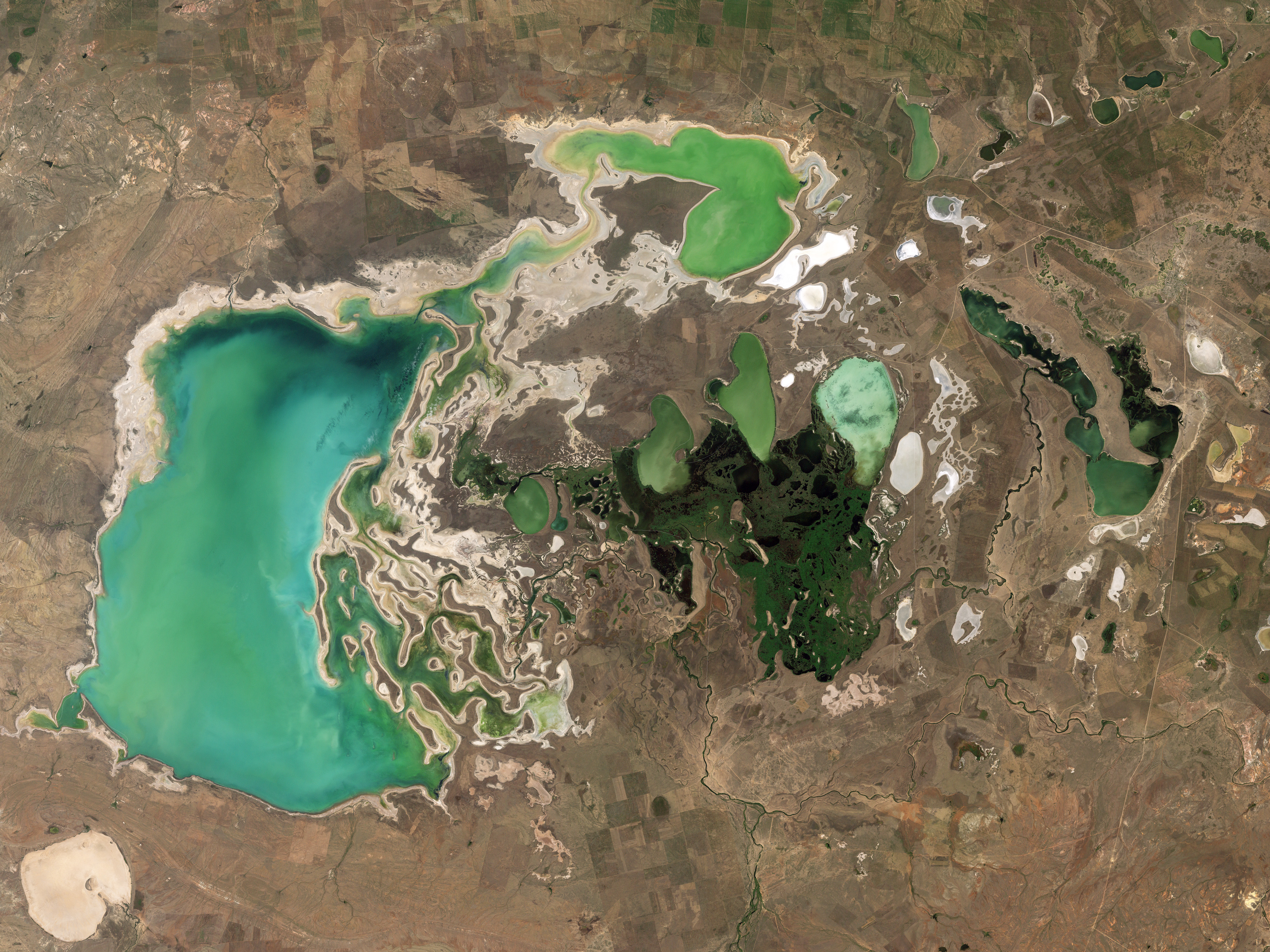
- 2008

- Location within Kazakhstan
- Location: Kazakhstan
- Coordinates: 50°26′23″N 68°54′0″E
- Type: Salt lake
- Primary inflows: Nura, Kulanotpes
- Basin countries: Kazakhstan
- Surface area: 1,382 km^{2} (534 sq mi)
- Average depth: 2.5 m (8 ft 2 in)
- Max. depth: 6.7 m (22 ft)
- Shore length^{1}: 470 km (290 mi)
- Surface elevation: 305 m (1,001 ft)
- Islands: Tengizi Islands

Ramsar Wetland
- Official name: Kourgaldzhin and Tengiz Lakes
- Designated: 11 October 1976
- Reference no.: 107
- ^{1} Shore length is not a well-defined measure.

Tengiz Lake (Kazakh: Теңіз көлі, Teñız kölı; Russian: Тенгиз^{[a]}) is a saline lake in Korgalzhyn District, Akmola Region, Kazakhstan.

The lake is part of the Korgalzhyn Nature Reserve, for which it was nominated in 2008 together with the Naurzum Nature Reserve as the first natural UNESCO World Heritage Site in Kazakhstan (Saryarka — Steppe and Lakes of Northern Kazakhstan).

On 15 October 1976, the Soviet spacecraft Soyuz 23 inadvertently made the Soviet Union's first splashdown into the northern part of the lake, which was frozen, crashing through the ice. The crew was saved thanks to a very difficult but successful rescue operation.

== Geography ==
Tengiz is a shallow lake, subject to seasonal variations in water level. Its eastern shore is deeply indented and includes the Tengizi Islands. The lake is located in an intermontane basin of the Kazakh Uplands and is the largest of the area. The deepest part of the lake reaches roughly 7 metres (23 ft).

The Nura and Kulanotpes are the main rivers flowing into the lake. Lake Korgalzhyn is located in the eastern part, Kiyakty to the southeast, Kozhakol to the north, and Kypshak and Kerey to the southwest of lake Tengiz.

== Ecology ==
The Lake Tengiz area is an important wetland site for birds. It is a part of a Ramsar wetland site of international importance, the Tengiz-Korgalzhyn Lake System, where 318 species of birds have been recorded, 22 of which are endangered. Lake Tengiz, along with neighboring lake Korgalzhyn, is the most northerly nesting site for the greater flamingo. In the years 2006-2008, around 14 000 breeding pairs were noted in the lake, with significant seasonal variation.

== Soyuz 23 splashdown incident ==
On October 15, 1976, following a docking malfunction with the Soviet space station Salyut 5, the Soyuz 23 mission, consisting of cosmonauts Valeri Rozhdestvensky and Vyacheslav Zudov, was aborted and returned to Earth. Due to high winds and blizzards, however, the capsule was blown 120 kilometres (75 mi) off course and landed in Lake Tengiz at 20:46 MSK, inadvertently performing the first Soviet splashdown. The capsule landed and floated on its side with the forward hatch in the water; the pressure equalization vent was above the waterline, allowing it to let in breathable air. Due to the salt in the lake, however, the reserve parachute's pyrotechnic charges corroded and activated, causing the parachute to deploy and take on water. Due to temperatures in the −20 °C (−4 °F) range, lake conditions were partially icy, causing attempts to rescue the cosmonauts using amphibious vehicles to fail to reach the capsule, which was 8 kilometres (5.0 mi) from the shore of the lake. Ultimately, a rescue helicopter was used to lift the capsule despite the winds and the waterlogged reserve parachute, and both cosmonauts were retrieved alive and safely.

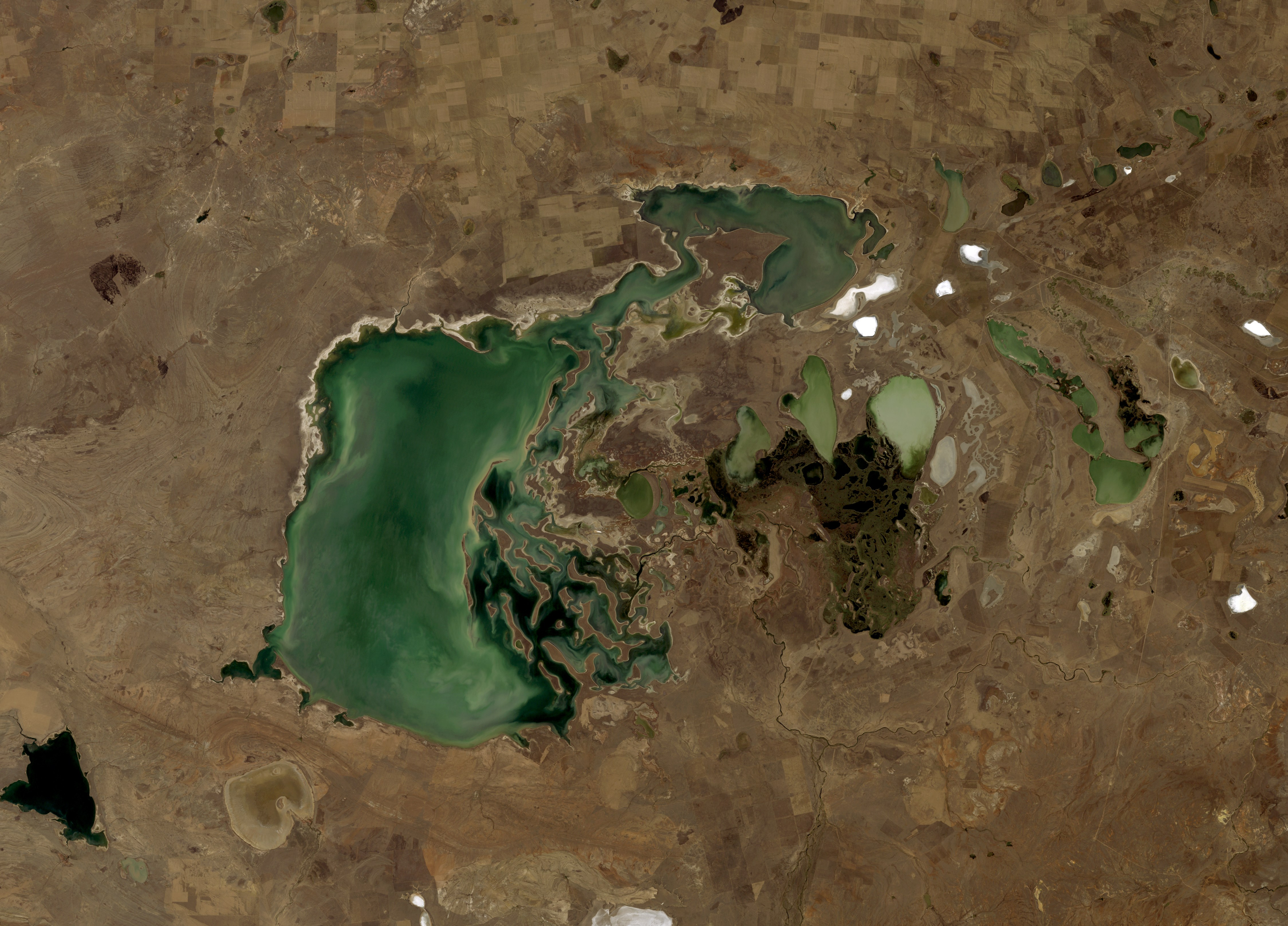
Tengiz Lake with a relative high level,
15 September 1998,
photo taken by Landsat 5 satellite.

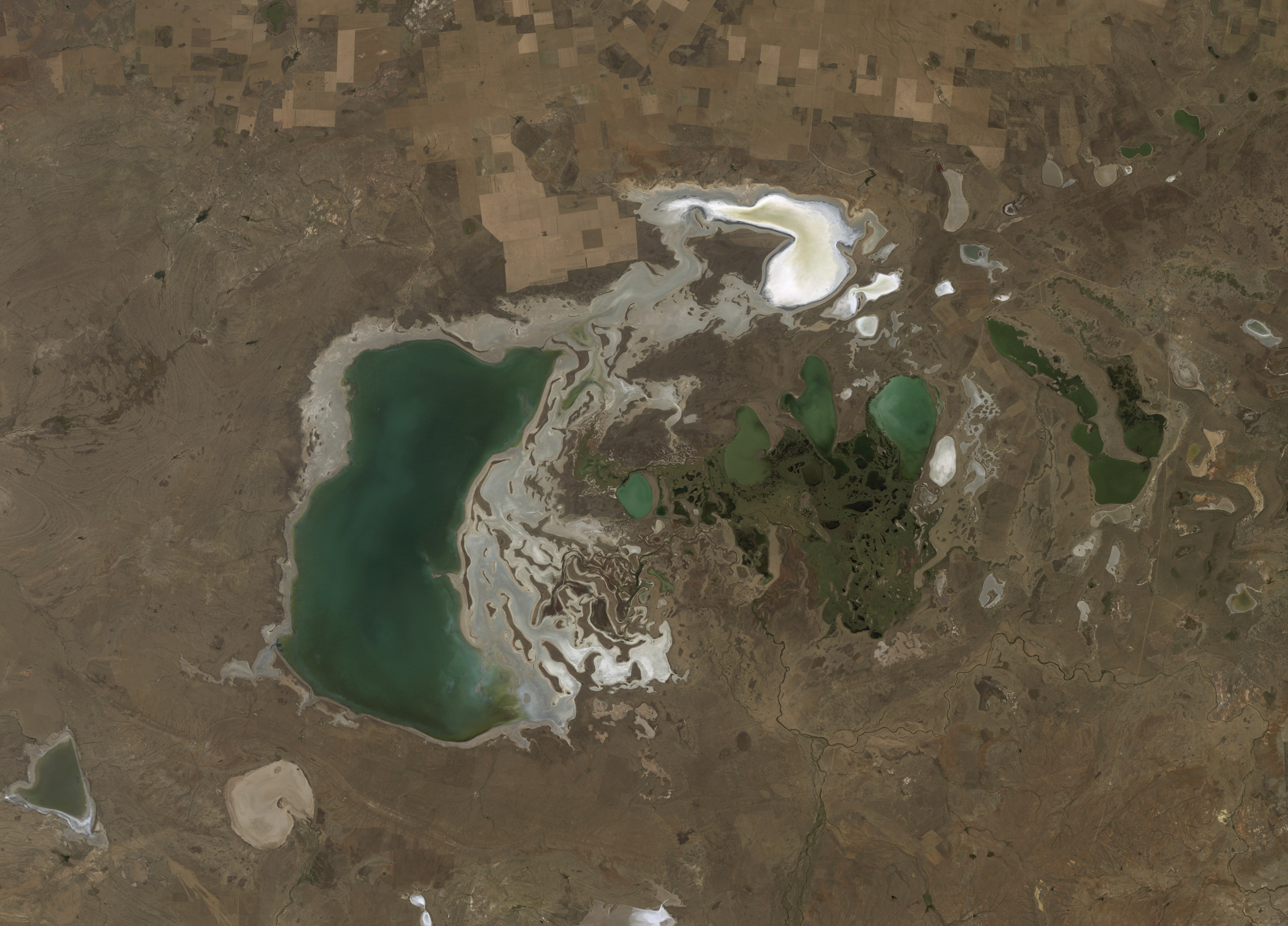
Tengiz Lake with a relative low level,
3 September 2011, north-east part and lake margins dried up,
photo taken by Landsat 5 satellite.

== Notes ==
a. ^{^} Tengiz, dengiz, deniz, etc. means "sea" in Turkic languages.
