= Saryarka – Steppe and Lakes of Northern Kazakhstan =

UNESCO World Heritage Site
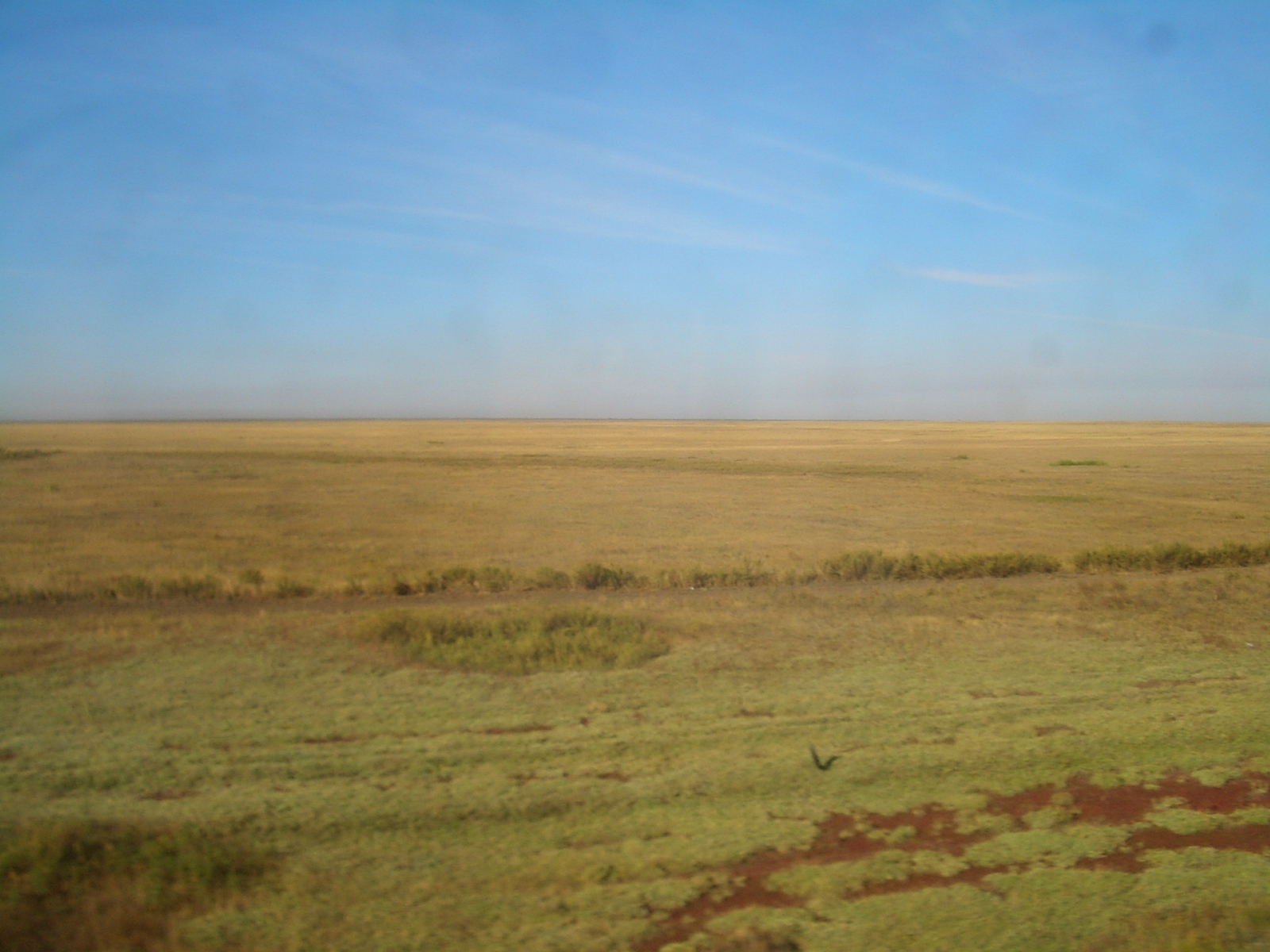
- Kazakh Uplands

- Location within Kazakhstan Location within West and Central Asia
- Location: Kazakhstan
- Includes: 1. Naurzum Nature Reserve; 2. Korgalzhyn Nature Reserve
- Criteria: Natural: (ix), (x)
- Reference: 1102rev
- Inscription: 2008 (32nd Session)
- Area: 450,344 ha (1,112,820 acres)
- Buffer zone: 211,147.5 ha (521,757 acres)
- Coordinates: 50°26′0″N 69°11′20″E

Saryarka – Steppe and Lakes of Northern Kazakhstan (Kazakh: Сарыарқа - Солтүстік Қазақстан даласы мен көлдері, romanized: Sarıarqa - Soltüstik Qazaqstan dalası men kölderi) is a part of the Kazakh Uplands (known in Kazakh as saryarka, or "yellow range") which has been designated a World Heritage Site by UNESCO. It was inscribed on July 7, 2008. (see List of World Heritage Sites in Kazakhstan) The site comprises the Naurzum State Nature Reserve (located in Kostanay Province) and Korgalzhyn State Nature Reserve (located in Aqmola Region). The two reserves contain wetlands which serve as important stop-over points for migrating birds from Africa, Europe, and South Asia. It is estimated that 15–16 million birds, including many endangered species, use the site as a feeding ground. The pink flamingos in particular are a major attraction within Korgalzhyn Reserve.

The site is also home to wildlife commonly found on the Kazakh steppe, including marmots, wolves, and the endangered saiga. Korgalzhyn nature reserve, being a part of World Heritage Site, is one of the most popular areas in Kazakhstan in terms of birdwatching
