= Nura District =

Coordinates: 50°15′36″N 71°33′00″E

Nura
- District
- Нұра ауданы
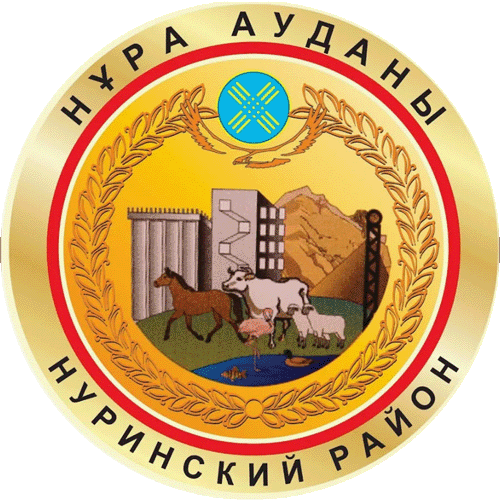
- Coat of arms

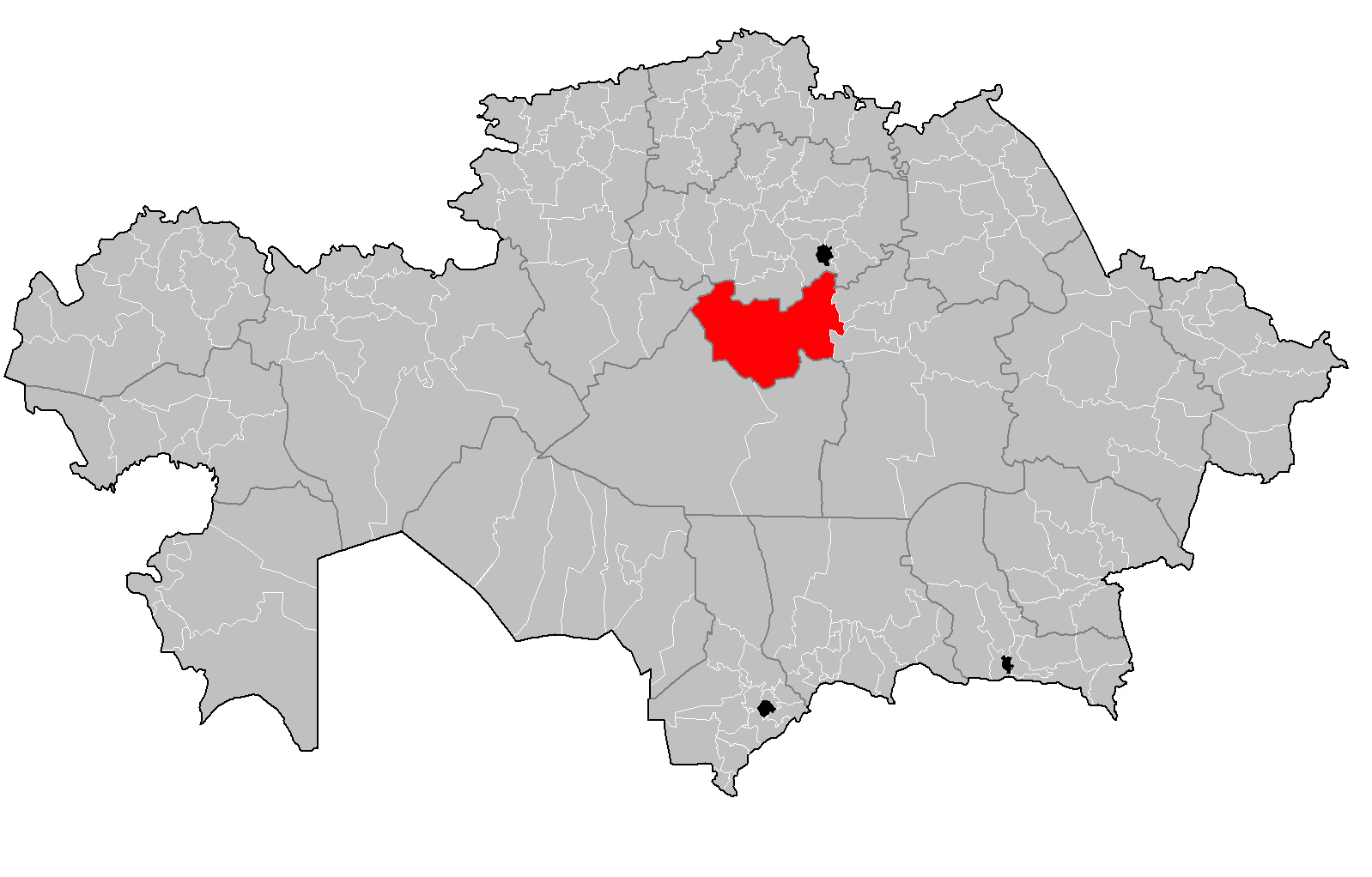
- Country: Kazakhstan
- Region: Karaganda Region
- Administrative center: Nura
- Founded: 1928

Government
  - Akim: Zhusup Zhumagulov

Population (2019)
  - Total: 22,569
- Time zone: UTC+6 (East)

Nura District (Kazakh: Нұра ауданы, Nūra audany) is a district of Karaganda Region in central Kazakhstan. The administrative center of the district is the settlement of Nura. The district has a population of 22,569 as of 2019.

== Geography ==
The district is located in the Kazakh Uplands. Rivers Kulanotpes and Sonaly, and lakes Kerey, Kypshak, Kiyakty and Shoshkakol are located in the district.

== History ==
During the 1890s, a number of Ukrainians, Russians, and Germans began constructing settlements in the area, which was already home to approximately 330 villages of the native Kazakh people. On April 19, 1923, by order of the Kirghiz SSR, the Nurinsk Volost was created as part of the Akmola Uyezd. On March 10, 1932, the Nurinsk Volost joined the newly created Karagandy Oblast. Nura became the district's administrative center in 1928.

The 1930s saw a number of modernization programs implemented in the district, with electricity, telephones, and postal services being introduced. 16 schools were erected as part of a wider Soviet program to combat illiteracy known as likbez.

During World War II, over 3,000 people from the district fought in the war, and 1,083 died in battle. Two residents of the district were awarded the Hero of the Soviet Union medal.

From 1954 to 1957, 7 state farms were created in the district as part of the Virgin Lands Program.

== Demographics ==
Historical population
Year	Pop.	±%
1999	38,649	—
2009	26,150	−32.3%
2019	22,569	−13.7%

Nura has suffered considerable population decline in post-Soviet times, with population falling from 38,649 (1999 census results), down to 26,150 (2009 census results), to 22,569 as of 2019.

=== Ethnic composition ===
Ethnic Groups of Nura District
Ethnic Group	Population (2019)	Percent of Total
Kazakhs	15,250	67.57%
Russians	3,901	17.28%
Ukrainians	1,286	5.70%
Germans	927	4.11%
Belarusians	377	1.67%
Tatars	305	1.35%
Chechens	55	0.24%
Mordvins	50	0.22%
Azeris	49	0.22%
Moldovans	45	0.20%
Chuvash	44	0.19%
Bashkirs	42	0.19%
Lithuanians	42	0.19%
Poles	41	0.18%
Koreans	32	0.14%
Uzbeks	11	0.05%
Greeks	5	0.02%
Others	107	0.47%
Total	22,569	100.00%

== Administrative divisions ==
Administrative divisions of the Nura District
Rural district/city	Population (2021)	Settlement(s)
Nura Rural Administration	6626	Nura
Kobetei Rural District	1302	Kobetei, Ondiris, Pervoe Maya
Ahmet Rural District	1221	Ahmet
Shubarkol Rural District	1142	Shubarkol
Kyzyltal Rural District	1036	Kertindi, Algabas
Tassuat Rural District	994	Kainar
Egindi Rural District	993	Egindi
Shahter Rural District	983	Shahterskoe
Baitugan Rural District	938	Baitugan, Zhanakurylys
Zarechnyi Rural District	871	Zarechnoe
Korganzhar Rural District	801	Karim Mynbaev
Industrialnyi Rural District	696	Tassuat
Muzbel Rural District	647	Muzbel
Barshin Rural District	641	Barshino, Bestamak
Akmeshit Rural District	614	Akmeshit, Kantai
Kenzharyk Rural District	548	Izendi, Kenzharyk, Toparkol
Karaoi Rural District	511	Karaoi
Zharaspai Rural District	394	Zharaspai
Karakoiyn Rural District	381	Zhanbobek, Akkolka
Kulanotpes Rural District	336	Kulanotpes, Aktubek, Nygman
Don Rural District	304	Kulanotpes
Saryozen Rural District	202	Tikenekti
Balyktykol Rural District	192	Balyktykol
Taldysai Rural District	160	Taldysai
Sonaly Rural District	122	Sonaly

== Notable people ==
- Nikolai Alexeyevich Kuznetsov, Soviet aviator
