= Nura (river) =

River in Kazakhstan

Nura Нұра
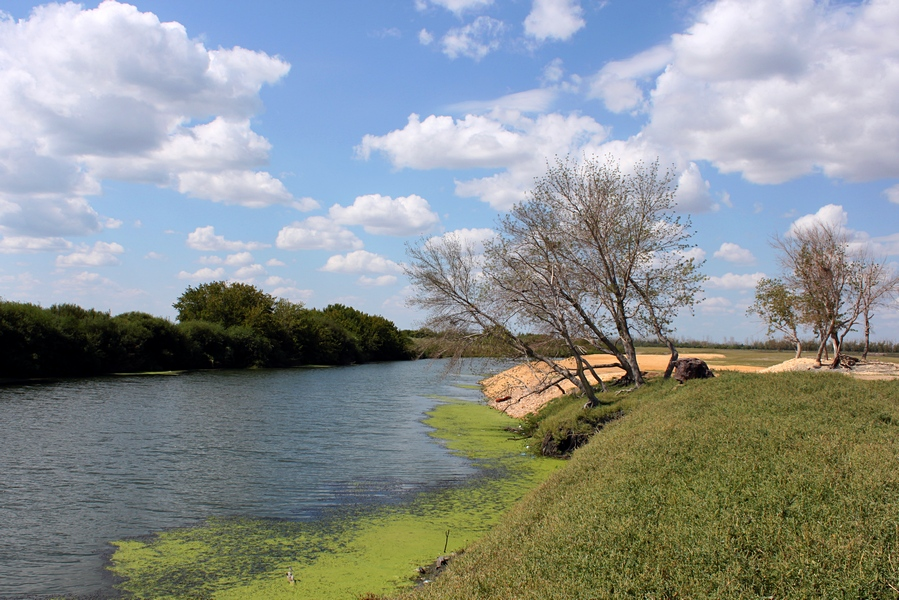

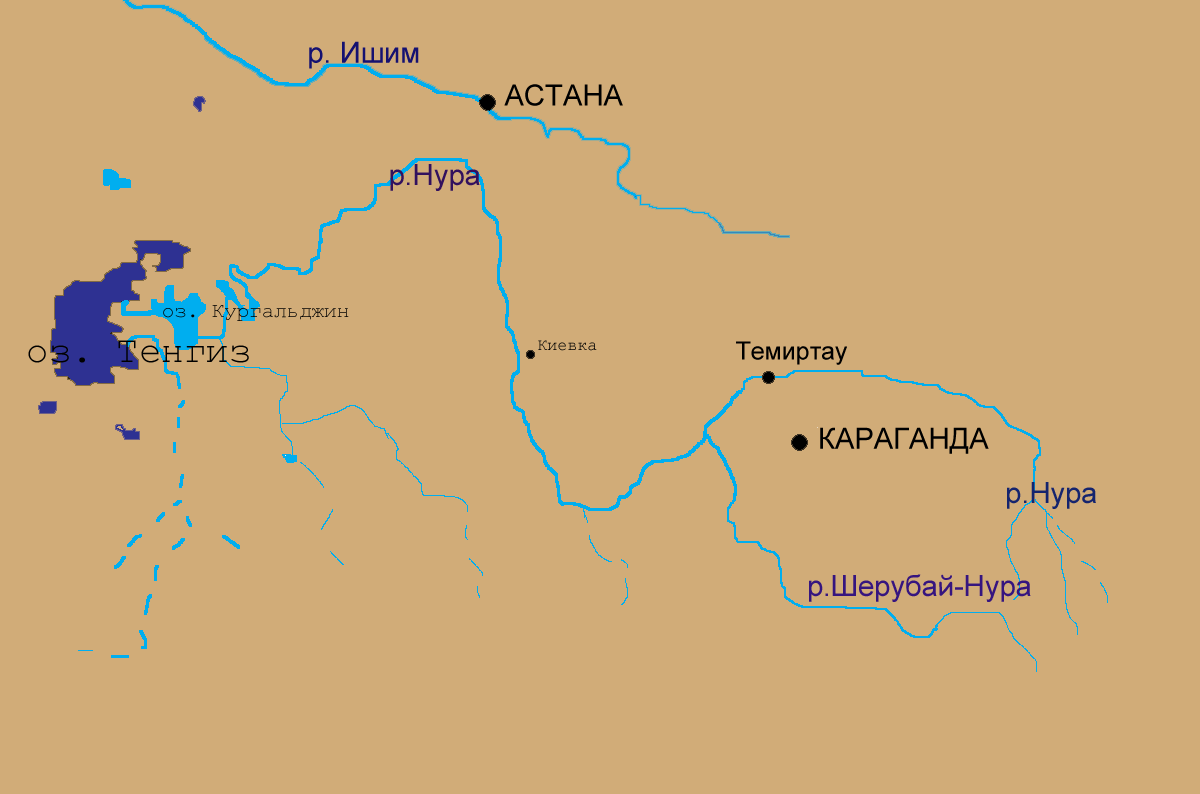
- Map of the general area

- Mouth location in Kazakhstan

Location
- Country: Kazakhstan
- Cities: Karaganda, Temirtau, Kyzylzhar, Saran, Astana

Physical characteristics
- Source: Kyzyltas; Kazakh Uplands
  - location: Near Besoba
  - coordinates: 49°20′30″N 74°44′11″E
  - elevation: 950 m (3,120 ft)
- Mouth: Lake Tengiz
  - coordinates: 50°20′34″N 69°08′21″E
  - elevation: 301 m (988 ft)
- Length: 978 km (608 mi)
- Basin size: 60,800 km^{2} (23,500 sq mi)
- Discharge
  - average: 28.39 m^{3}/s (1,003 cu ft/s)
  - minimum: 0 m^{3}/s (0 cu ft/s)

Basin features
- Tributaries
  - left: Sherubainura

The Nura (Kazakh: Нұра, Nūra; Russian: Нура) is a major watercourse of northeast-central Kazakhstan. It is 978 kilometres (608 mi) long and drains an area of 60,800 square kilometres (23,500 mi^{2}).

== Course ==
The river rises in the Kyzyltas mountains, 4 km south of Qarakolboldy, which is a subrange of the Kazakh Uplands and flows initially north-northwestwards for about 100 kilometres (62 mi). It then turns to the west and flows in that direction for 220 kilometres (140 mi), then southwest for 180 kilometres (110 mi). The Nura turns north near Esengeldi for about 200 kilometres (120 mi), eventually turning southwest as it draws close to Astana, near the river Irtysh. From there, it flows southwest for almost 300 miles (480 km) through a series of lakes, including Sholakshalkar and Korgalzhyn, finally ending in the endorheic Lake Tengiz. The river's largest tributaries are the Sherubainura, Ulken Kundyzdy, Akbastau and Ashchysu. It is heavily used for irrigation and municipal water supply. The average discharge at the mouth is 28.39 cubic metres per second (1,003 cu ft/s).

The Irtysh–Karaganda Canal crosses the Nura at 50°05′26″N 73°22′40″E, in what appears to be a tunnel. Some of the canal's water is directed into the Nura (a chute below the dam at 50°5′30″N 73°22′37″E), replenishing this river.

The Samarkand Reservoir is constructed on the Nura downstream from the canal crossing (the dam is at 50°06′17″N 72°55′08″E), providing a waterfront for the city of Temirtau.

== Pollution ==
In 1972, an acetaldehyde factory in the city of Temirtau began to discharge large quantities of mercury waste into the river. Although the factory closed in 1997, large amounts of mercury remain in the river and the area around it. Most of the mercury is spread in alluvial soils for a 25-kilometre (16 mi) stretch from Temirtau to the Intumak Reservoir, where most of the pollution was trapped. Despite that, significant levels of mercury are still found as far as 70 kilometres (43 mi) downstream and during high water, contaminants are spread all over the floodplain, creating a widespread problem. There is an estimated 1,500,000 cubic metres (53,000,000 ft^{3}) of contaminated soil surrounding the site. Ash from coal-fired power plants also pollutes the river.

== See also ==
- List of rivers of Kazakhstan
- Karasor Basin
