= Korgalzhyn District =

Coordinates: 50°28′48″N 70°13′12″E

Korgalzhyn
- District
- Qorğaljyn audany
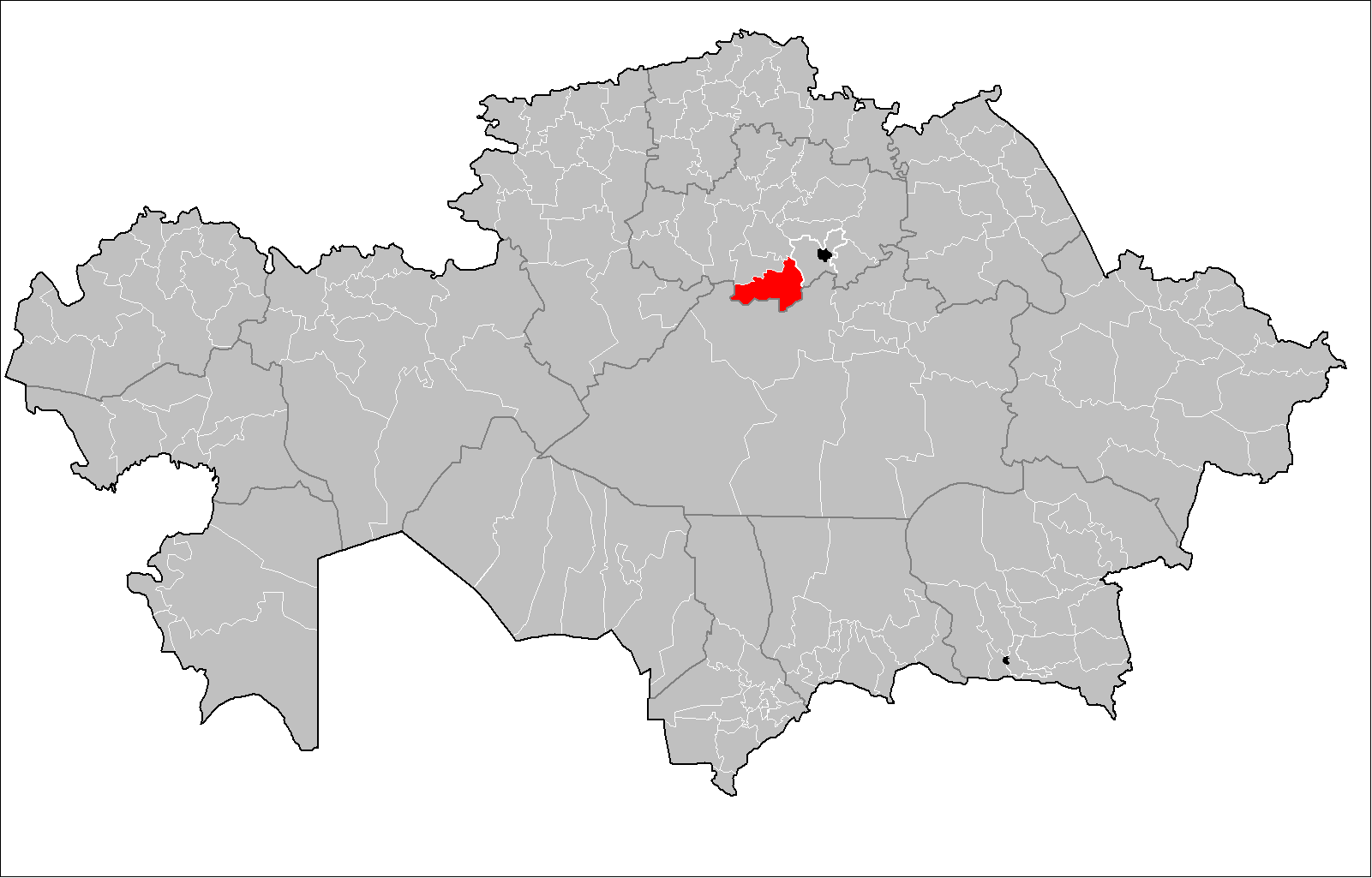
- Country: Kazakhstan
- Region: Aqmola Region
- Administrative center: Korgalzhyn
- Founded: 1918

Government
  - Akim: Alin Almas

Area
  - Total: 3,600 sq mi (9,300 km^{2})

Population (2013)
  - Total: 9,505
- Time zone: UTC+5 (East)

Korgalzhyn District (Kazakh: Қорғалжын ауданы, Qorğaljyn audany) is a district of Aqmola Region in northern Kazakhstan. The administrative center of the district is the selo of Korgalzhyn. Population: 10,289 (2009 census results); 16,705 (1999 census results).

== Geography ==
The district is located in the Kazakh Uplands. Lakes Zhalmankulak and Kozhakol are located in the district.

== History ==
Was founded in 1918 as a Sabundy district. First chairman was Zhantayev Tolepbek. In 1935 was refounded as Korgalzhyn district.
