= Hu (people) =

Chinese term for non-Sinitic peoples

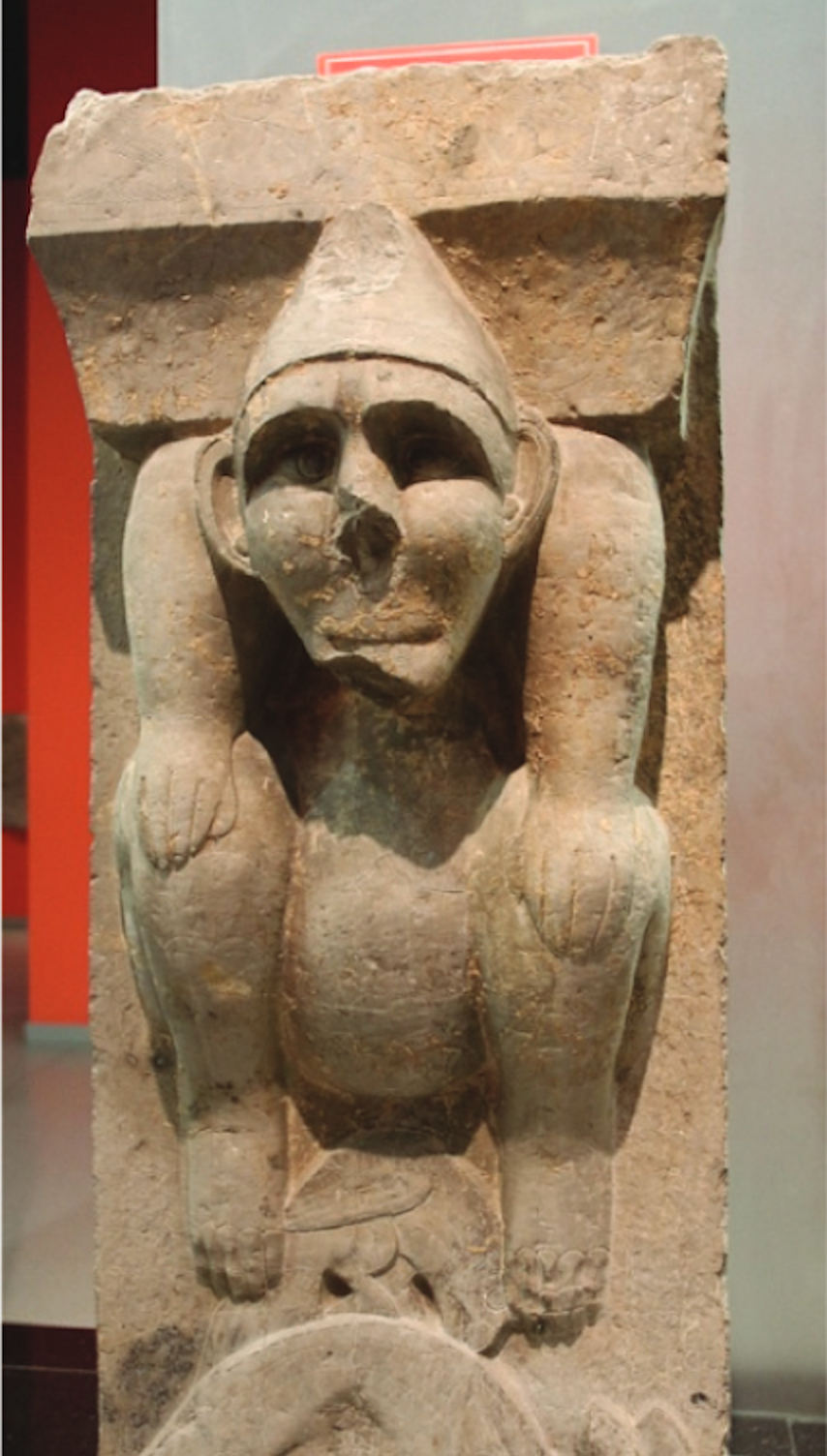
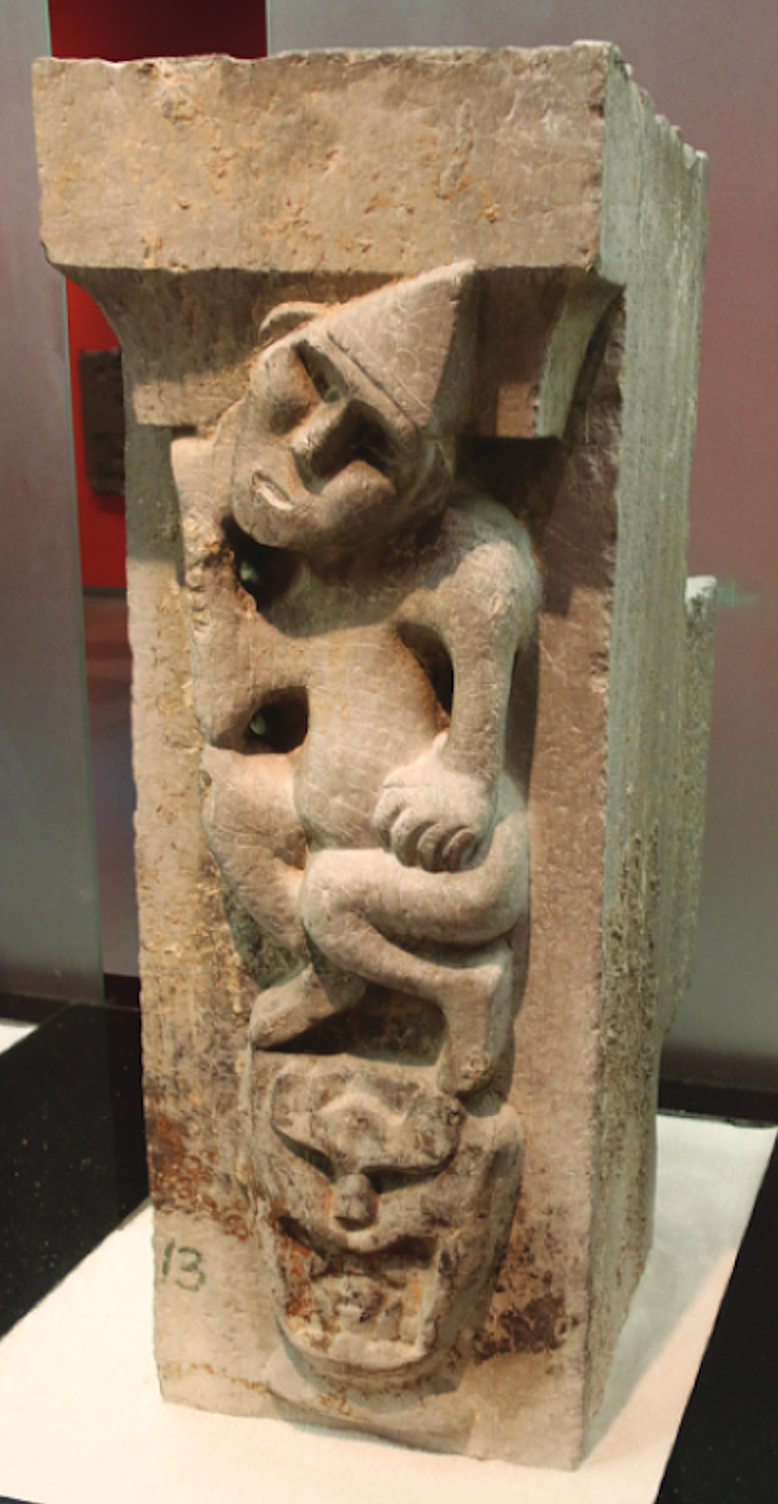
Hu statues from Wu Baizhuang tomb (吳白莊), late Eastern Han period (2nd century CE), Linyi, Shandong

Hu (Chinese: 胡; pinyin: Hú; Wade–Giles: Hu; IPA: [xǔ]), Huren (胡人; "Hu people") or Huzu (胡族; "Hu clans"), was a rather vague umbrella term used in imperial China to describe non-Sinitic peoples, particularly steppe nomads from Inner Asia. The Hu were usually tribal confederations from the great grasslands of the Mongolian Plateau and the Western Regions, with a nomadic pastoralist lifestyle and a strong militant horse culture specializing in mounted archery and light cavalry warfare.

According to Hill (2009):

The term hu 胡 was used to denote non-Han Chinese populations. It is, rather unsatisfactorily, commonly translated as 'barbarian'. While sometimes it was used in this general way to describe people of non-Han descent, and carried the same negative overtones of the English term, this was not always the case. Most frequently, it was used to denote people, usually of Caucasoid or partial Caucasoid appearance, living to the north and west of China.

According to Nicola Di Cosmo, the Chinese considered the Hu as "a new type of foreigner" and "this term, whatever its origin, soon came to indicate an 'anthropological type' rather than a specific group or tribe, which the records allow us to identify as early steppe nomads. The Hu were the source of the introduction of cavalry in China".

== History ==
Historical records from Bronze Age Chinese dynasties such as the Shang and Zhou dynasty, the latter of which included the Spring and Autumn and Warring States periods, recounted numerous encounters with the non-Huaxia tribes beyond the authority of the Son of Heaven. At that time, the preferred term to designate non-Sinitic peoples, whom the ancient Chinese regarded as culturally backward and barbaric, was "Four Barbarians" (Chinese: 四夷; pinyin: sìyí), each of which was named for a cardinal direction relatively to the Central Plains: the Dongyi (東夷; "Eastern Barbarians"), Nanman (南蠻; "Southern Barbarians"), Xirong (西戎; "Western Barbarians"), and Beidi (北狄; "Northern Barbarians").

=== Ancient Various Hu Peoples ===
During the Warring States period, the term "Hu" mainly referred to the Linhu, Loufan, and Donghu. Historian Xu Zhuoyun argues that the prolonged Hu–Han conflicts extending from the Wei, Jin and Northern Dynasties through to the An Lushan Rebellion made North China a long-term battleground for many Hu regimes. Listed below are the various ethnic groups referred to as "Hu peoples" in Chinese history.

| Ethnic group | Distribution area | Period of appearance in Chinese history | Name appearing outside China | Period of appearance outside China |
|---|---|---|---|---|
| Linhu (lín hú) | Northern Shanxi, eastern Ordos Plateau. | 7th century BC to 3rd century BC | N/A | N/A |
| Loufan (lóu fán) | Northwestern Shanxi, southern Inner Mongolia. | 7th century BC to 2nd century BC | N/A | N/A |
| Donghu (dōng hú) | Mongolia, Heilongjiang, Jilin, Liaoning, Inner Mongolia. After being defeated by Modu, they retreated to Wuhuan Mountain and Xianbei Mountain, becoming the Wuhuan and Xianbei. | 8th century BC to 2nd century BC | N/A | N/A |
| Yuezhi (yuè zhī; it has now been established that the old reading ròuzhī was a misreading — see the article) | Eastern Qinghai, western Gansu, Central Asia | 6th century BC to 162 BC; later driven out by the Xiongnu | Kushan Empire, Tocharians | In the 2nd century BC in the Central Asian region |
| Wuhuan (wū huán) | Inner Mongolia, Mongolia | 4th century BC to the end of the 3rd century CE; some later moved into Han areas, adopted local customs and became Sinicized, assimilating into the Han people. | Uncertain | N/A |
| Xianbei (xiān bēi) | Heilongjiang, Jilin, Liaoning, Inner Mongolia and Mongolia. Later migrated inward to the Yellow River basin in the north of Han-populated territory. | 4th century BC to the 6th century CE; some moved into Han areas and, following local customs, became Sinicized, though their numbers were too few to produce significant Han intermixing. | N/A | N/A |
| Xiongnu (xiōng nú) | Mongolia and Inner Mongolia, western Northeast China, Gansu, eastern Xinjiang. After the Southern Xiongnu migrated inward, they established regimes such as Former Zhao, Xia and Northern Liang in the northern Han regions. The Northern Xiongnu migrated westward, or relocated to Xinjiang, Central Asia, and Europe. | 3rd century BC to the 1st century CE | One theory links them to the Huns of Iran, Eastern Europe and elsewhere, though this remains disputed. | 3rd century BC to the 4th century CE |
| Qiang (qiāng) | Gansu, Qinghai, western Sichuan, eastern Xinjiang, northeastern Tibet | From the Warring States period to the present. Most Qiang who moved into Han areas were gradually assimilated into the Han during the Wei, Jin, and Northern and Southern Dynasties. The modern Qiang people are not the same ethnic group as the ancient Qiang. | Uncertain | N/A |
| Di (dī) | Gansu, Qinghai, western Sichuan | 2nd century BC to the 6th century CE; assimilated into the Han after moving into Han areas. | No corresponding name | N/A |
| Jie (jié) | Origin unknown; later moved into Shanxi | 2nd century CE to 4th century CE; perished in wars against the Han and other peoples after moving into Han areas. | Uncertain | N/A |
| Dingling (dīng líng), Gaoche (gāo chē), Shule (shū lè) | Shores of Lake Baikal, at today's Mongolia–Russia border; later relocated to Xinjiang. | 1st century BC to the 5th century CE; perished in wars with various peoples. | Uncertain | Uncertain |
| Rouran (róu rán) / 蠕蠕 (ruán ruán) / 茹茹 (rú rú) | Today's Mongolia, Inner Mongolia and eastern Xinjiang | Early 3rd century CE to early 6th century CE | The Avars of the Caucasus and Balkan Peninsula, still to be confirmed. | Appeared in the Central Asian region from the 6th to the 9th century CE |
| Turks (tū jué) | Today's Mongolia, Inner Mongolia, Xinjiang, Kazakhstan, Kyrgyzstan, Siberia in Russia, and eastern Eastern Europe | Late 5th century CE to the present | The various Turkic peoples of Central Asia; the titular nations of Azerbaijan and Turkey. | Mid-6th century CE to the present |
| Huige (huí hé) / Huihu (huí hú) | Today's Mongolia, Inner Mongolia, Gansu, Xinjiang, Siberia in Russia and elsewhere | Early 7th century CE to the mid-10th century CE | The Uyghur people of Central Asia | 9th century CE to the present |
| Tubo (tǔ fān or tǔ bō) | Today's Tibet, Qinghai, western Sichuan, Gansu and southern Xinjiang | 6th century CE to the present | The Tibetan Buddhist peoples of India and Nepal. | 6th century CE to the present |
| Khitan (qì dān) | Today's Mongolia, Inner Mongolia, Northeast China; some later also relocated to Xinjiang and Kazakhstan. Modern Kyrgyzstan has a Khitan-descended tribe of about 500,000 people. They once established the Liao and Western Liao regimes. | 388 CE to the present | Khitan (Chinese appellation) | Middle Ages to the present |
| Kumo Xi (kù mò xī) / Xi people | A branch of the Yuwen of the Xianbei; possibly of the same stock as the Khitan | 4th century CE to the mid-12th century CE | Uncertain | Uncertain |
| Shiwei (shì wéi) | Today's Mongolia, Inner Mongolia, western Northeast China, and southern Siberia in Russia | Late 6th century CE to late 10th century CE | One of the predecessors of the various Mongolic peoples. | N/A |
| Mongols (měng gǔ) | Before Genghis Khan, they dwelt in today's Mongolia, China's Eastern Four Leagues, eastern Xinjiang, and southern Siberia in Russia. They established the Mongol Empire and the Yuan dynasty. After withdrawing from Han lands and the fall of the Northern Yuan, they continued to live on the Mongolian steppe to this day. | Late 8th century CE to the present | The Proto-Mongols and others. | Late 12th century CE to the present |
| Tangut (dǎng xiàng) | Ningxia, Gansu, southwestern Mongolia, southeastern Xinjiang. They established the Western Xia regime. | Mid-8th century CE to early 13th century CE | None | Uncertain |
| Mohe (mò hé) | The Russian Far East and Northeast China, northeastern Inner Mongolia; they once established the Balhae and other regimes. | Early 7th century CE to early 10th century CE | Developed into the various Tungusic peoples of Northeast Asia. | N/A |
| Jurchen (nǚ zhēn) | Manchuria (excluding Liaodong and Inner Mongolia), northeastern Inner Mongolia, and Siberia in Russia | Early 10th century CE to the present; they once established the Jin and the Qing dynasty | Jurchen, Manchu | In the 17th century the name "Manchu" came into use; the Russians first made contact after reaching the Amur River region. |

=== Xiongnu ===
In the Qin state (before 221 BC), the term "Hu" came into designated usages to specifically describe the Xiongnu, who would be classified under the aforementioned Beidi concept. For example, the Xiongnu prince Jin Midi (134–86 BC), a naturalized prisoner of war later promoted as a confidant of Emperor Wu of Han, would be described as both a Hu person and a Yidi (夷狄). To the east of the Xiongnu were Proto-Mongol people known as the Donghu (東胡; "Eastern Hu"), whose descendants became the Xianbei and Wuhuan after the Xiongnu destroyed their confederation.

Increasing raids, lootings and abduction of civilians for slavery by the Xiongnu was a primary reason for the construction of elongated defensive walls (precursors of the Great Wall of China) by various ancient Chinese states such as Yan, Zhao and Qin, which culminated in a Qin expeditionary campaign in 215 BC that dealt heavy blow to the Xiongnu in the Hetao region around the Yellow River's Ordos Loop. However, during the civil war after the Qin dynasty's collapse, the Xiongnu were united into a powerful nomadic empire under Modu Chanyu, who defeated and purged rival steppes confederacies (such as Donghu and Yuezhi, the latter being permanently evicted into Central Asia), and also occupied the Hetao region, thus becoming a prominent threat to the Guanzhong heartland during the early Western Han dynasty. This prompted Emperor Gaozu of Han to sortie against the Xiongnu at the Battle of Baideng, but he was ambushed and trapped and only escaped after bribing the chanyu's wife. The Han was then forced to pay the Xiongnu tribute for the next seven decades through so-called "marriage alliances", a situation that lasted until the reign of Emperor Wu, the seventh Han emperor, who successfully waged a war against the Xiongnu that tipped the geopolitical landscape in favor of the Han, allowing new trade routes (i.e. the Northern Silk Road) and power projection into the Western Regions via the Hexi Corridor, which were previously monopolized by the Xiongnu.

Subsequent Han emperors such as Emperor Xuan and Emperor Ming further capitalized on the strategic advantages gained under Emperor Wu and established the Protectorate of the Western Regions and later the Chief Official of the Western Regions, the latter of which lasted until two centuries after Han dynasty's collapse. The Han hegemony in Inner Asia led many of Xiongnu's prior vassals and tributary states in Central Asia to turn against them, coupled with attacks from resurgent old foes such as the Donghu, causing the Xiongnu to fall into civil wars and fragmentate into two, namely the Northern Xiongnu and Southern Xiongnu. The Southern Xiongnu later subjected to the Han Empire as a vassal, while the Northern Xiongnu remained hostile and was evicted further west from Central Asia in 151 CE, eventually disappearing from historical records, leading many historian scholars to suspect them as the ancestors of the Huns.

=== Zahu and Five Barbarians ===
The fall of the Eastern Han dynasty during the turn of the 3rd century coincided with the disintegration of the Southern Xiongnu vassal state on the northern frontier. From then on, the Xiongnu identity gradually disappeared as their descendants were referred to as "Hu" instead. These miscellaneous Hu people (雜胡; záhú) were loosely grouped based on their shared geography or characteristics, such as the Lushuihu (盧水胡; "Black River Hu") in northwestern China and Shanhu (山胡; "Mountain Hu") in the mountainous regions of Shanxi. Many of these Hu intermingled among themselves and with tribes from other ethnic groups, eventually amalgamating into the Buluoji (步落稽) or Jihu (稽胡) that inhabited Shaanbei and western Shanxi by the 6th century CE. The Jihu disappeared by the late 7th century CE, presumably as they completed their assimilation into Chinese society.

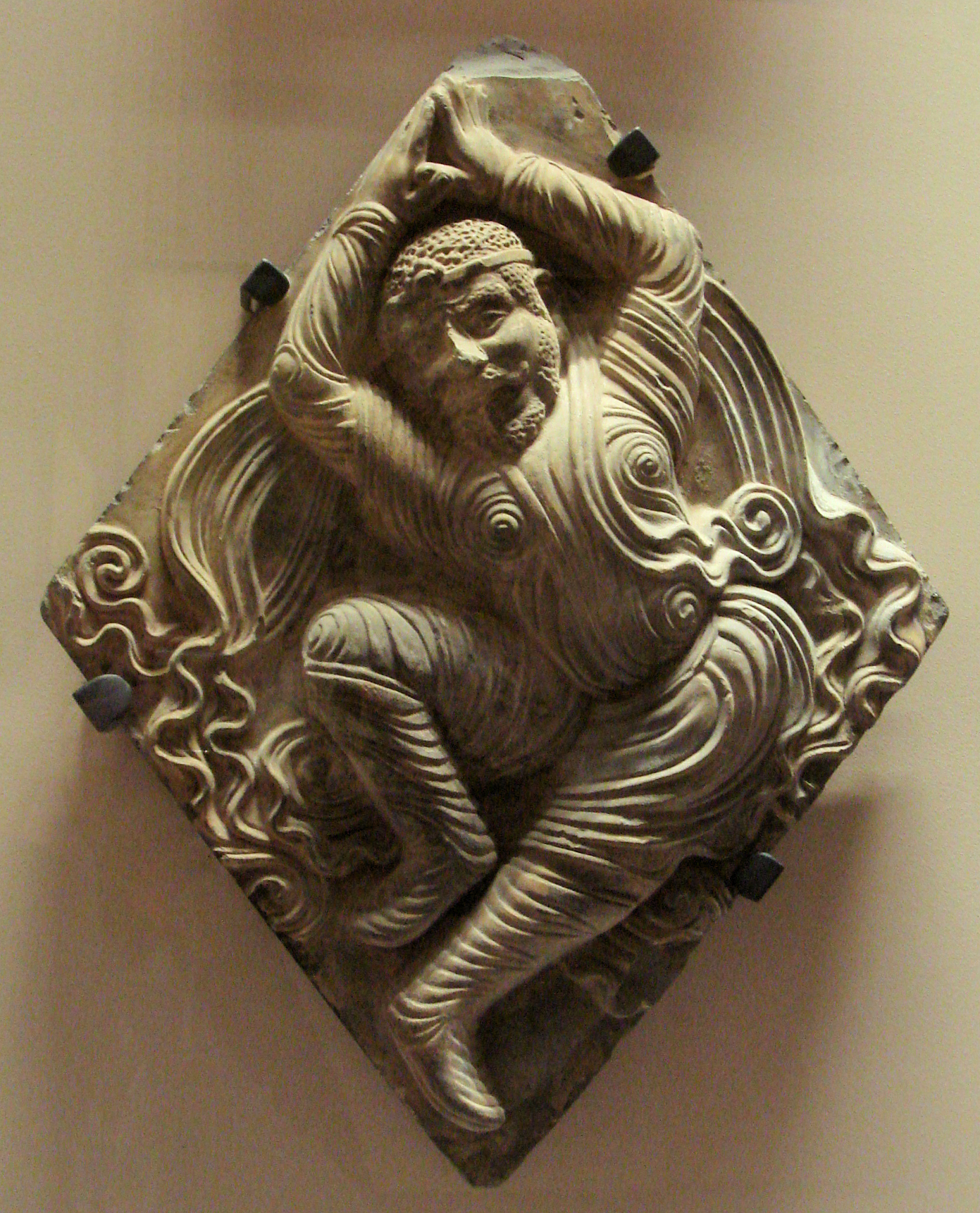
Sogdian Huteng dancer, Xiuding temple pagoda, Anyang, Henan, China, Tang dynasty, 7th century.

Hu was also used in a broad sense to refer to the non-Han groups that inhabited northern China during the Jin dynasty (266–420 CE) and Sixteen Kingdoms period, which later gave rise to the term "Five Barbarians". While the term first appeared in an edict in 357 CE, the most popular interpretation of the Five Barbarians only came about in the 13th century, that is they represented the Xiongnu, Jie, Xianbei, Di and Qiang. The origins of the Jie is still unclear (most scholars suggest that they originated from Central Asia), but they likely arrived in China through the Southern Xiongnu. The Di and Qiang, both Tibeto-Burman peoples from the Tibetan Plateau and Hexi Corridor in the west, were typically not referred to as Hu during their time.

Many tribes of the Five Barbarians had settled into the northern frontiers and Guanzhong heartlands by the Western Jin period, and took advantage of the political chaos after the War of the Eight Princes to launch rebellions in northern China from 304 to 316, culminating in the Disaster of Yongjia in 311 CE where the Xiongnu Han-Zhao state captured and sacked the Jin capital Luoyang. This Upheaval of the Five Barbarians caused the surviving Jin royal court to relocate to Jiankang (modern-day Nanjing) on the south bank of the Yangtze River and establish the Eastern Jin dynasty. The Five Barbarians then established the Sixteen Kingdoms, among whom total wars and ethnic cleansings were frequent until they were finally all conquered and unified under the Northern Wei in 439 CE, beginning the Northern and Southern dynasties period.

The Rouran Khaganate, a multi-ethnic tribal confederation comprising primarily Xiongnu and Donghu, was founded in the Mongolian plateau in 330 CE. They were involved in royal intermarriages (heqin) with the Northern Yan, the Northern Wei dynasty and Wei's warring successors Eastern Wei and Western Wei, before being overthrown by the Göktürk First Turkic Khaganate in 555 CE.

Later, "Hu" was also used to include various groups of Iranic peoples from Central Asia who settled in China for trade, especially the Sogdians. The Tang dynasty conquered the Eastern Turkic Khaganate and defeated the Western Turkic Khaganate, creating a hegemony in Inner Asia with the establishment of the Protectorate General to Pacify the West. Central Asian trading caravans and tributary convoys became common, and Central Asian cultural practices that spread into Tang heartlands would then be qualified as "Hu", such as their dance the "Huteng" (胡腾, "barbarian hopping"), or the Huxuan (胡旋, "barbarian whirling", also 胡旋舞, Húxuănwǔ, "barbarian whirling dance"), but known as "Sogdian Whirl dance" or simply "Sogdian whirl" to Western scholars.

=== Turkic peoples ===
During the Sui and Tang dynasty, "Hu" also included Turkic peoples along the Silk Road such as Göktürks, Uyghurs and Shatuo, in addition to the Sogdians. Some of these Hu people had been sinicized so much that they became a significant part of Tang court politics, taking over prominent military and administrative roles such as fanzhen jiedushi, allowing them to become powerful warlords and oligarchs that the Tang relied upon heavily to manage other Hu threats.

The defection of the Turkic Karluk mercenaries were instrumental to the Abbasid Caliphate and the Tibetan Empire defeating the Tang at the Battle of Talas in 751, which subsequently led to the loss of Tang control over Transoxiana and most of the Western Regions. Two naturalized Sogdian warlords, An Lushan and Shi Siming, waged a massive rebellion in 755 that almost toppled the Tang dynasty. As a result, the heavily sinicized Shatuo people were instead entrusted to guard the Tang Empire's northern borders, and one such clan was even bestowed the surname Li as a token for their loyalty, with Li Keyong being rewarded heavily for his contribution defeating the Huang Chao Rebellion in 884.

After Tang dynasty's collapse in 907, three of the Five Dynasties that ruled over northern China (Later Tang, Later Jin and Later Han) were headed by Shatuo sovereigns, who by this point were so completely sinicized that they were no longer regarded as Hu people, rather as Han Chinese. The "Hu" name was instead given to the newly arrived nomads to the north, the Khitans.

=== Mongolics and Tungusic peoples ===
The mountainous Sixteen Prefectures of Yan–Yun, which commanded the most important natural barriers that shielded the North China Plain from northerly invasions, were ceded to the Khitans in 938 by Later Jin founder Shi Jingtang in exchange of Khitan military aid in his selfish rebellion against his brother-in-law, Emperor Li Congke of Later Tang. The loss of this strategic region from Han Chinese control gave the Khitans a solid staging area for invading southwards, which proved decisive when the Khitan army under Yelü Deguang invaded and conquered the Later Jin in 947. In 958, Emperor Guo Rong of Later Zhou attempted to recapture the Sixteen Prefectures via a northern expedition while taking advantage of political chaos within the Khitan Liao dynasty, but despite many victories, his campaign had to be abandoned after he fell ill and died in 959.

After Later Zhou general Zhao Kuangyin usurped the throne of Guo Rong's 7-year-old heir Guo Zongxun to establish the Song dynasty in 960, he chose to wage war against the Ten Kingdoms to the south instead of continuing the late Guo Rong's northern campaign to reclaim the Sixteen Prefectures. However, by the time his brother and successor Zhao Guangyi finally decided to deal with the northern threat, the Khitans had already ended the two decades of infighting and stabilized politically. The Liao dynasty decisively defeated the Song dynasty's campaigns to recapture the Sixteen Prefectures twice in 979 and 986, but Liao's attempt to invade south was also defeated in 1004, resulting in the signing of the Chanyuan Treaty in 1005.

Due to the Song dynasty's inability to recapture either the Sixteen Prefectures or the Hexi Corridor, Han Chinese no longer had access to the Western Regions or the Liao region, and the only northern non-Sinitic peoples they knew for the next century and a half were the newly risen Tibeto-Burman Tanguts from the northwest, who occupied the Hexi Corridor and founded the Western Xia; and the Para-Mongolic Khitans from the northeast, who founded the Liao dynasty. These peoples became the new "Hu" peoples, even though they had little ethnolinguistic relations to the previous Hu groups in Chinese history. Frequent border disputes, raids and invasions would occur between the Song, the Liao and the Western Xia, most often waged by the latter two to extort tributes from the former. Song and Liao ceased large-scale military conflicts with each other after the Chanyuan Treaty (though favoring the Liao, who received annual tributes and still continued small-scale border raids), while open conflicts between Song and Western Xia persisted.

In 1114, the Tungusic Jurchens from Northeast Asia rebelled against the Khitans to establish the Jin dynasty. Seeing an opportunity to settle old grudges, the Song court made an Alliance Conducted at Sea with the Jurchen leadership in 1120 to attack the Liao together, resulting in the Jin conquering the Liao in 1125. However, seeing how poorly the Song army performed in battle, the Jurchens' ambition grew and the Jin–Song wars soon started. Now faced with a new and far more aggressive Hu threat, the Song court acted indecisively and cowardly, resulting in the humiliating Jingkang incident in 1127 that collapsed the Song dynasty. Surviving Song court who fled the capital Kaifeng established a rump state south of the Huai River based at Lin'an called the Southern Song dynasty. The loss of territories north of the Huai River also meant that Song no longer bordered its bitter rival Western Xia, who was defeated by the Jin dynasty and instead became a vassal state to the Jurchens. Despite a counteroffensive by General Yue Fei in 1140 almost successfully recapturing all lost territories, Emperor Gaozong and grand chancellor Qin Hui forcefully ordered Yue's retreat and later executed him under fabricated charges in order to sign the Treaty of Shaoxing. The Song and Jin then reached an uncomfortable stalemate across the Qin–Huai Line for the next nine decades.

In 1205, the newly established Mongol Empire led by Genghis Khan invaded Western Xia, and openly rebelled against the Jin dynasty in 1211. Genghis died three days before completing the conquest of Western Xia in 1227, and his son Ögedei Khan made an alliance with the Song in 1232 to attack the Jin together. This turned out to be a repeat of the strategic mistake that the Song made with the Liao dynasty, as the Ögedei soon turned against the Song after conquering the Jin in 1234. Now facing an even more ferocious Hu threat, the Southern Song dynasty would resist the Mongols bitterly for the next 45 years, defeating and allegedly killing Möngke Khan at the Siege of Diaoyucheng in 1259, until it was finally conquered by Kublai Khan in 1279.

After Yuan dynasty was established by Kublai, the Mongols now ruled over all of China and implemented a "four-class" sociopolitical system where the Mongols occupied the upper class, followed by the "Semu" peoples (the various older Hu peoples from Central Asia, who subjected to the Mongol conquest the earliest), the "Han" people (Han Chinese who were already ruled by the Liao and Jin dynasties) and the "Southerner" (subjects of Southern Song dynasty, who surrendered the last). This type of systemic racial discrimination and oppression further fueled ethnic tensions between the Han Chinese and all those Inner Asian ethnic groups that ruled above them, culminating in numerous rebellions and eventually the overthrow of the Yuan dynasty by Zhu Yuanzhang's Ming dynasty in 1368. By this point, the term "Hu" had already fallen out of popular usage, while the word "Tatars" (鞑靼) or "Dazi" (鞑子) had become the new derogatory generic term for nomads in the north.

== Influence ==
Due to the historical interaction with the Hu people, the character "Hu" has become a somewhat catch-all term in the Chinese language that can be used to describe many things of foreign origin. For example, many Chinese string instruments that were originally introduced from the Western Regions became collectively known as huqin (Chinese: 胡琴), literally meaning "Hu zither", the most famous example being the erhu. The black pepper, an Indian spice introduced into China in large quantities during the Tang dynasty, is still known as hujiao (胡椒) or "Hu pepper" today.

The sesame, an oilseed introduced via the Silk Road earlier during the Han dynasty, was once known as huma (胡麻) or "Hu hemp", and the sesame-topped shaobing was once known as hubing (胡饼) or "Hu flatbread", both later renamed due to naming taboos during the Sixteen Kingdoms period when Hu peoples were the upheaved rulers of northern China. Similarly, the cucumber, also introduced during the Han dynasty, was once known as hugua (胡瓜) or "Hu melon" and later renamed due to naming taboos.

Many Chinese words and idioms also use "Hu" to describe messy, unruly or dishonest behaviors, (Note: Examples being expressions such as 胡来, 胡说八道, 胡言乱语, 胡作非为, 胡搅蛮缠 and 胡吃海喝.) similar to the derogatory use of "Man" (蛮) to describe impulsive, reckless violent acts.

== See also ==
- Four Barbarians (四夷), a term used during the Shang and Zhou dynasty to describe various non-Huaxia peoples in the Far East.
- Fan (番), a Chinese term originally used to describe semi-agrarian mountain peoples from the south and southwest, now used as a term for "foreign" or "aboriginal".
- Tatars (韃靼 or 韃子), a Han Chinese ethnic slur for the Mongols during the late Yuan dynasty and the Ming dynasty, later also used to describe the Manchus during the early Qing dynasty.
- Yangren (洋人, lit. "ocean people") or derogatorily Yang guizi (洋鬼子, lit. "ocean devil-spawn"), a Modern Chinese term for foreigners, especially Westerners who historically came via maritime trade.
- Laowai (老外, lit. "old foreigner"), a Mandarin Chinese slang for foreigners.
- Gweilo (鬼佬, lit. "ghost boy"), a Cantonese slur for white people.
