= Ducun =

Ducun may refer to the following locations in China:

- Linhu, Suzhou, formerly Ducun (渡村镇), town in Wuzhong District, Suzhou, Jiangsu
- Ducun, Fuping County, Shaanxi (杜村镇), town in Fuping County, Shaanxi
- Ducun, Jiaozhou (杜村镇), town in Jiaozhou City, Shandong
