= Scytho-Siberian world =

Iron Age Eurasian steppe cultures

The spread of Scythian cultures 100 BC
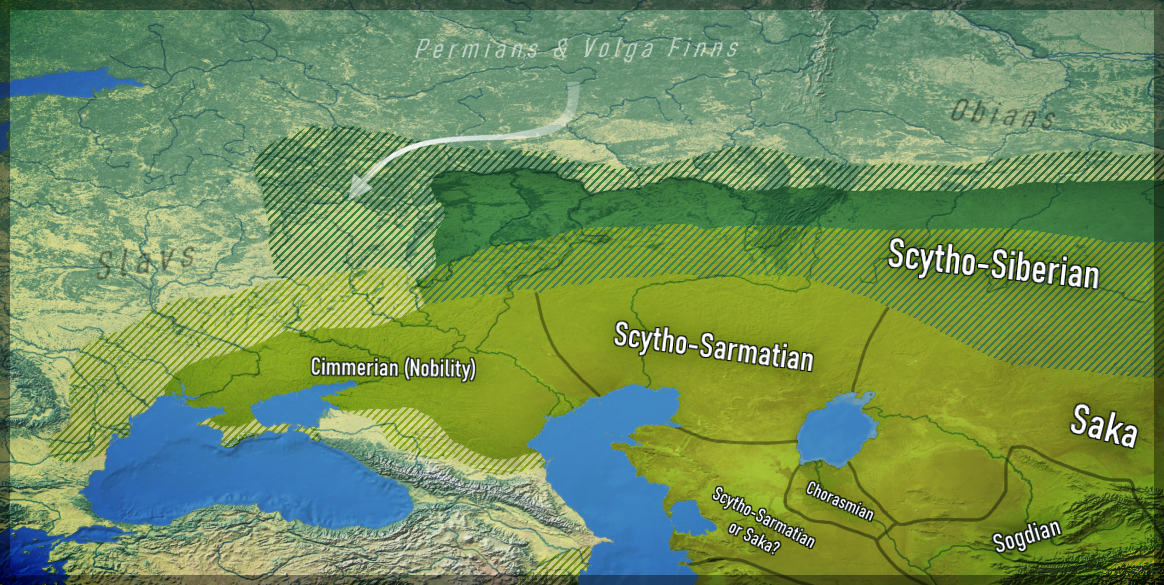
- Geographical range: Eurasian Steppe
- Period: Iron Age
- Dates: c. 900 BC–200 AD
- Preceded by: Srubnaya culture, Andronovo culture
- Followed by: Goths, Alans, Xiongnu, Circassians

The Scythian cultures (Note: Also referred to as the Scytho-Siberian world, Scythic cultures, Scytho-Siberian cultures, Early Nomadic cultures, the Scythian civilization, the Scythian horizon, the Scythian world, or the Scythian continuum.) was an archaeological horizon that flourished across the Eurasian Steppe during the Iron Age, from approximately the 9th century BC to the 2nd century AD. It included the Scythian, Sauromatian and Sarmatian cultures of Eastern Europe, the Saka-Massagetae and Tasmola cultures of Central Asia, and the Aldy-Bel, Pazyryk and Tagar cultures of south Siberia.

The Scythian-Siberian world was characterized by the Scythian triad, which are similar, yet not identical, styles of weapons, horses' bridles, and jewelry and decorative art. The question of how related these cultures were is disputed among scholars. Its peoples were of diverse origins, and included not just Scythians, from which the cultures are named, but other peoples as well, such as the Cimmerians, Massagetae, Saka, Sarmatians, and obscure forest-steppe populations. Mostly speakers of the Scythian branch of the Iranian languages, (Note: "[A] nomadic people made up of many different tribes thrived across a vast region that stretched from the borders of northern China and Mongolia, through southern Siberia and northern Kazakhstan, as far as the northern reaches of the Black Sea. Collectively they were known by their Greek name: the Scythians. They spoke Iranian languages ...") all of these peoples are sometimes collectively referred to as Scythians, Scytho-Siberians, Early Nomads, or Iron Age Nomads.

== Origins and spread ==
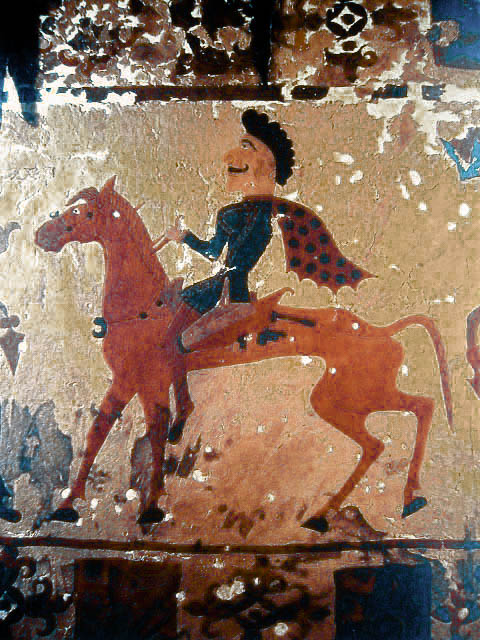
Horseman from the Pazyryk burials, c. 300 BC, one of the most famous archaeological discoveries from the Scytho-Siberian world. Equestrianism is one of the chief characteristics of the Scytho-Siberian world

The Scytho-Siberian world emerged on the Eurasian Steppe at the dawn of the Iron Age in the early 1st-millennium BC. Its origins have long been a source of debate among archaeologists. The Pontic–Caspian steppe was initially thought to have been their place of origin, until the Soviet archaeologist Aleksey Terenozhkin suggested a Central Asian origin.

Excavations at Arzhan in Tuva, Russia have uncovered the earliest Scythian-style kurgan yet found. Similarly the earliest examples of the animal style art which would later characterize the Scytho-Siberian cultures have been found near the upper Yenisei River and North China, dating to the 10th century BC. Based on these finds, it has been suggested that the Scytho-Siberian world emerged at an early period in southern Siberia. It is probably in this area that the Scythian way of life initially developed. Recent genetic studies have concluded that the Scythians formed from European-related groups of the Yamnaya culture and East Asian/Siberian groups during the Bronze Age and early Iron Age.

The Scytho-Siberian world quickly came to stretch from the Pannonian Basin in the west to the Altai Mountains in the east. There were, however, significant cultural differences between east and west. Over time they came in contact with other ancient civilizations, such as Assyria, Greece and Persia. In the late 1st millennium BC, peoples belonging to the Scytho-Siberian world expanded into Iran (Sakastan), India (Indo-Scythians) and the Tarim Basin. In the early centuries AD the western part of the Scytho-Siberian world came under pressure from the Goths and other Germanic peoples. The end of the Scythian period in archaeology has been set at approximately the 2nd century AD.

Recent archeological and genetic data confirmed that Western and Eastern Scythians of the 1st-millennium BC originated independently, but both formed from a combination of a Yamnaya-related ancestry component from the area of the European steppes, and an East Asian-related component most closely corresponding to the modern North Siberian Nganasan people of the lower Yenesei. Furthermore, archaeological evidence now tends to suggest that the origins of the Scytho-Siberian world, characterized by its kurgan burial mounds and its Animal style of the 1st-millennium BC, are to be found among Eastern Scythians rather than their Western counterparts: eastern kurgans are older than western ones (such as the Altaic kurgan Arzhan 1 in Tuva), and elements of the Animal style are first attested in areas of the Yenisei river and modern-day China in the 10th century BC. The rapid spread of the Scytho-Siberian world, from the Eastern Scythians to the Western Scythians, is also confirmed by significant east-to-west gene flow across the steppes during the 1st millennium BC.

== Peoples ==
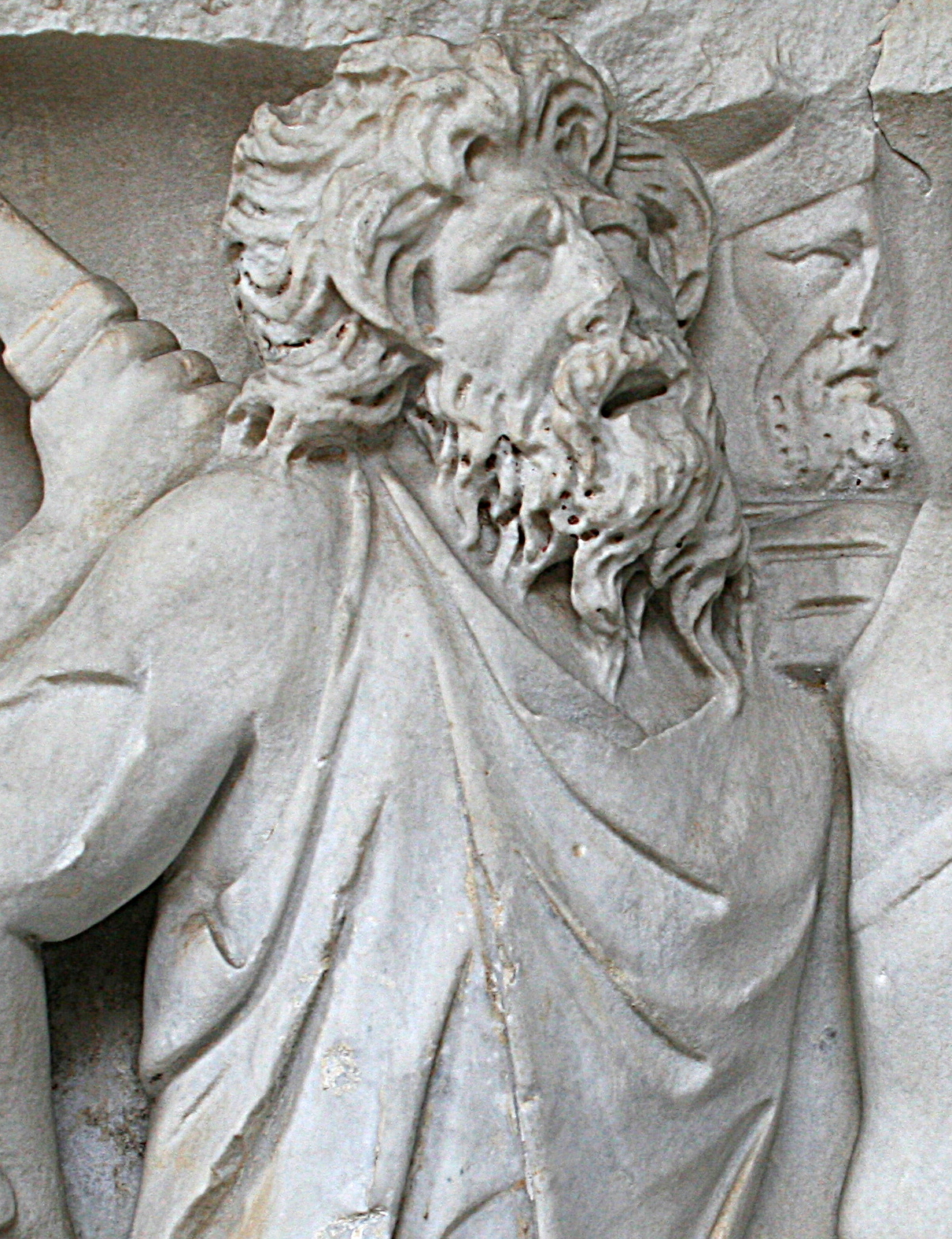
Depiction of a Sarmatian from a Roman sarcophagus, 2nd century AD. Although a different people than the Scythians, the Sarmatians were part of the Scytho-Siberian world.

=== Ethnicity ===
The peoples of the Scytho-Siberian world are mentioned by contemporary Persian and Greek historians. They were mostly speakers of Iranian languages. Despite belonging to similar material cultures, the peoples of the Scytho-Siberian world belonged to many separate ethnic groups. Peoples associated with the Scytho-Siberian world include speakers of the Scythian languages:

- Massagetae
- Sarmatians
- Saka
- Scythians
- Agathyrsi
- Sigynnae
- Cimmerians
- Forest steppe people

Although the peoples of the forest steppe were part of the Scytho-Siberian world, their origins are obscure; there might have been early Slavs, Balts, and Finno-Ugric peoples among them. The settled population of the Scytho-Siberian world areas also included Thracians.

=== Terminology ===
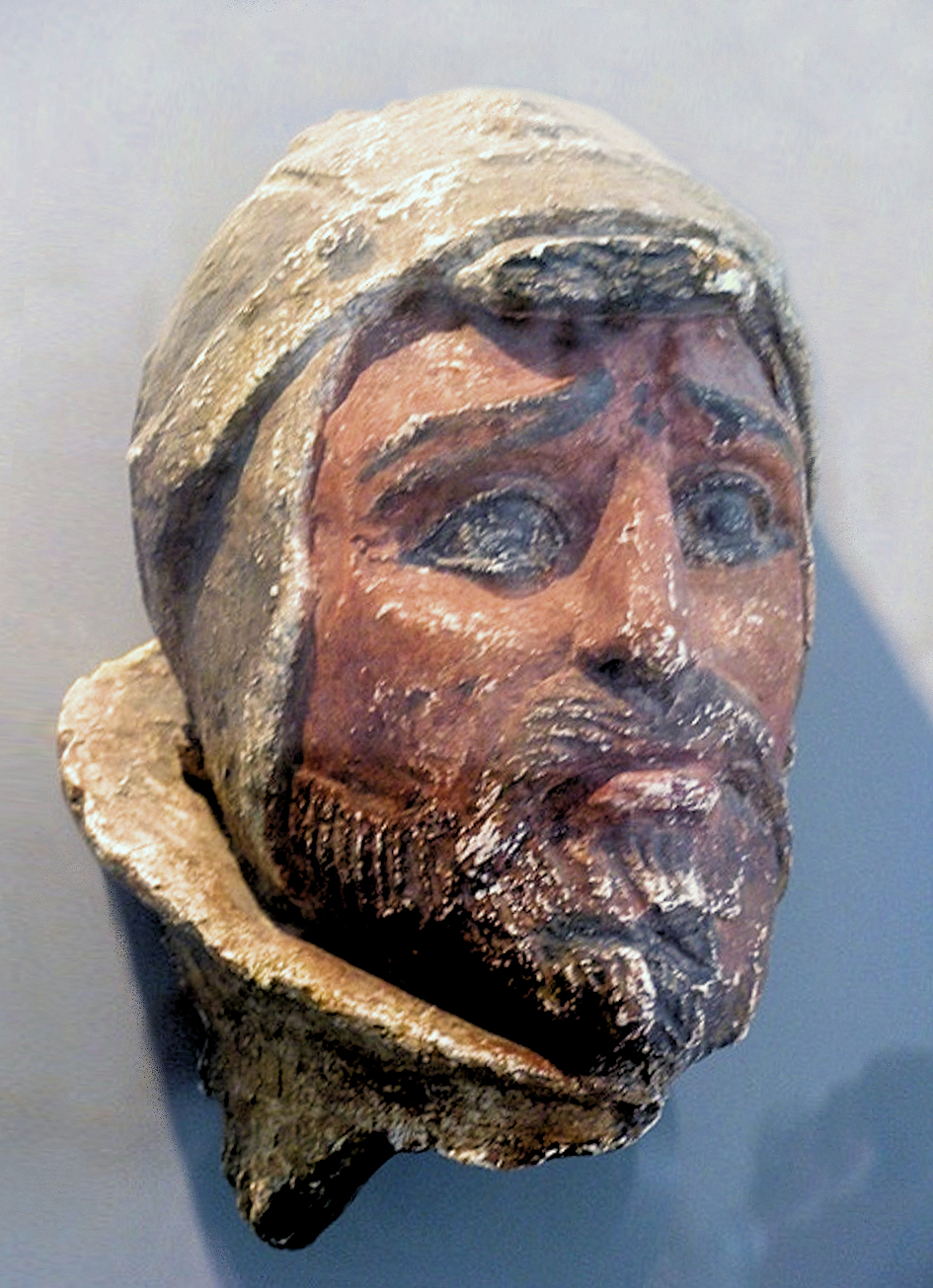
Head of a Saka warrior, as a defeated enemy of the Yuezhi, from Khalchayan, northern Bactria, 1st century BC.

Among the diverse peoples of the Scytho-Siberian world, the Scythians are the most famous, due to the reports on them published by the 5th century BC Greek historian Herodotus. The ancient Persians referred to all nomads of steppe as Saka. In modern times, the term Scythians is sometimes applied to all the peoples associated with the Scytho-Siberian world. Within this terminology it is often distinguished between "western" Scythians living on the Pontic–Caspian steppe, and "eastern" Scythians living on the Eastern Steppe. The term Scytho-Siberians has also been applied to all peoples associated with the Scytho-Siberian world. The terms Early Nomads and Iron Age Nomads have also been used. The terms Saka or Sauromates, and Scytho-Siberians, is sometimes used for the "eastern" Scythians living in Central Asia and southern Siberia respectively.

The ambiguity of the term Scythian has led to a lot of confusion in literature. (Note: "The Achaemenids called the Scythians 'Saka' which sometimes leads to confusion in the literature. The term 'Scythians' is particularly used for the representatives of this culture who lived in the European part of the steppe zone. Those who lived in Central Asia are often called Sauromates or Saka and in the Altai area, they are generally known as Scytho-Siberians.")

Nicola Di Cosmo (1999) questions the validity of referring to the cultures of all early Eurasian nomads as "Scythian", and recommends the use of alternative terms such as Early Nomadic. (Note: "Even though there were fundamental ways in which nomadic groups over such a vast territory differed, the terms 'Scythian' and 'Scythic' have been widely adopted to describe a special phase that followed the widespread diffusion of mounted nomadism, characterized by the presence of special weapons, horse gear, and animal art in the form of metal plaques. Archaeologists have used the term 'Scythic continuum' in a broad cultural sense to indicate the early nomadic cultures of the Eurasian steppe. The term 'Scythic' draws attention to the fact that there are elements – shapes of weapons, vessels, and ornaments, as well as lifestyle – common to both the eastern and western ends of the Eurasian steppe region. However, the extension and variety of sites across Asia makes Scythian and Scythic terms too broad to be viable, and the more neutral 'early nomadic' is preferable, since the cultures of the Northern Zone cannot be directly associated with either the historical Scythians or any specific archaeological culture defined as Saka or Scytho-Siberian.")

By ancient authors, the term "Scythian" eventually came to be applied to a wide range of peoples "who had no relation whatever to the original Scythians", such as the Huns, Goths, Turks, Avars, Khazars, and other unnamed nomads.

== Characteristics ==
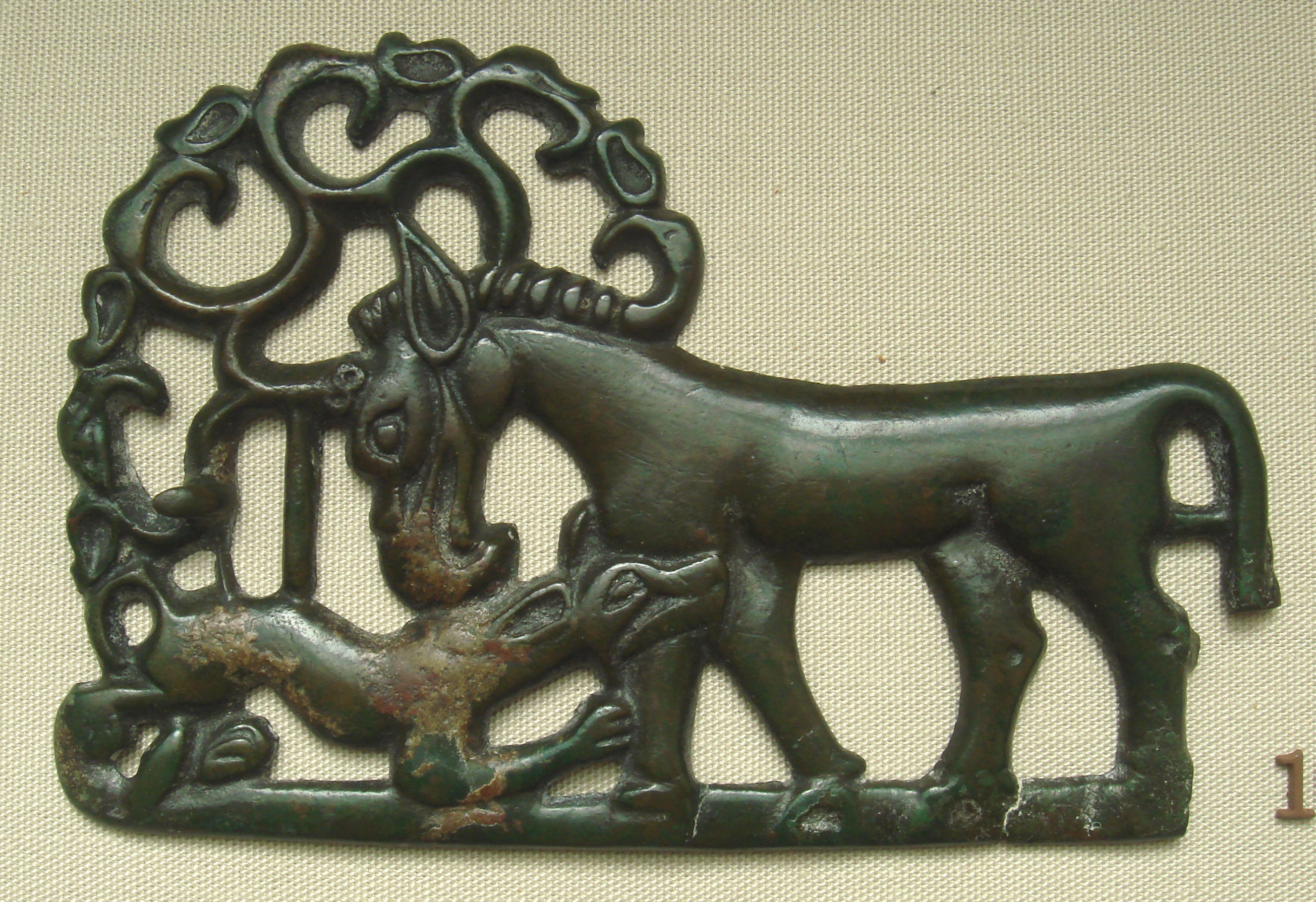
Horse attacked by tiger, Ordos culture, 4th–1st century BC. The cultures of the Scytho-Siberian world are characteristic for their art, which was made in the animal style.

The cultures of the Scytho-Siberian world are recognized for three characteristics known as the Scythian triad:

- similar, yet not identical, shapes for horses' bridles,
- their weapons, especially their distinct short, composite bows, and
- the styling on their jewelry and decorations.

Their art was made in the animal style, so characteristic that it is also called Scythian art.

=== Finds ===
In the beginning of the 18th century, Russian explorers began uncovering Scythian finds throughout their newly acquired territories.

Significant Scythian archaeological finds have been uncovered up to recent times. A major find are the Pazyryk burials, which were discovered on the Ukok Plateau in the 1940s. The finds are revealed the form of mummification practiced by the Scythians. Another important find is the Issyk kurgan.

=== Society ===
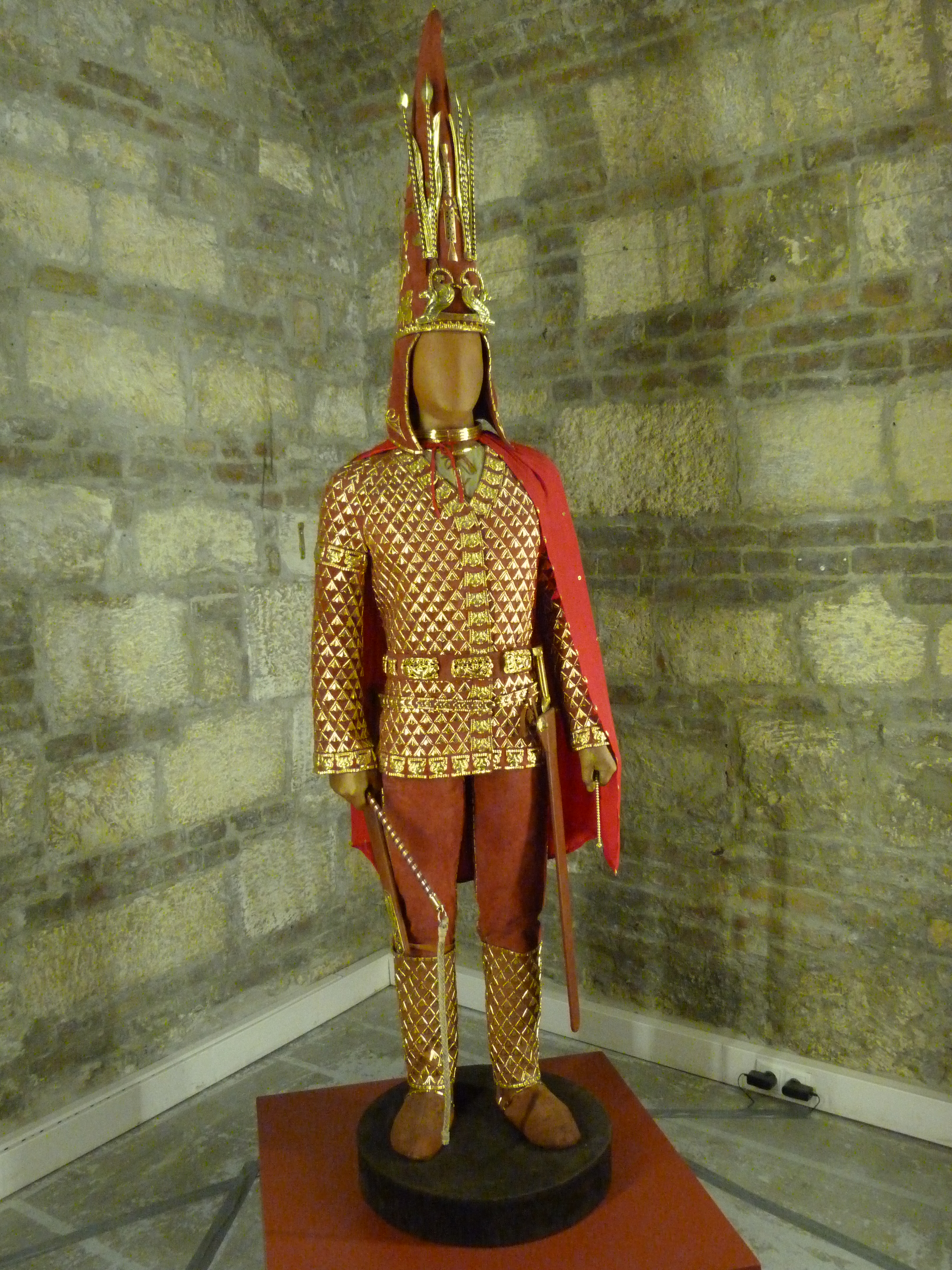
The Golden Man of Issyk Kurgan, c. 4th–3rd century BC

The Scythians were excellent craftsmen with complex cultural traditions. Horse sacrifices are common in Scythian graves, and several of the sacrificed horses were evidently old and well-kept, indicating that the horse played a prominent role in Scythian society. They played a prominent role in the network connecting ancient civilizations known as the Silk Road. The homogeneity of patrilineal lineages and contrasting diversity of matrilineal lineages of samples from Scythian burial sites indicate that Scythian society was strongly patriarchal.

Numerous archaeological finds have revealed that the Scythians led a warlike life: Their competition for territory must have been fierce. The numerous weapons placed in graves are indicative of a highly militarized society. Scythian warfare was primarily conducted through mounted archery. They were the first great power to perfect this tactic. The Scythians developed a new, powerful type of bow known as the Scythian bow. Sometimes they would poison their arrows.

=== Physical appearance ===
The Scythians were tall and powerfully built, even by modern standards. (Note: "[T]he [elite] Scythians were relatively tall. This tallness is particularly noticeable in warrior burials and those of men of the upper social stratum, who would seem tall even today ... [T]hese skeletons differ from those of today in their longer arm and leg bones and a generally stronger bone formation ... The physical characteristics of the Scythians correspond to their cultural affiliation: [T]heir origins place them within the group of Iranian peoples ... [W]e are dealing with a period in which huge areas of Siberia far into Mongolia were still inhabited by ancient Europoids.") Skeletons of Scythian elites differ from those of modern people by their longer arms and legs, and stronger bone formation. Commoners were shorter, averaging 10–15 cm (3.9–5.9 in) shorter than the elite.

Their physical traits are characteristic of Iranian peoples and support a common origin indicated by the linguistic evidence, however, people of mixed physical appearance are also indicated by the archaeological and historical evidence.

Numerous Eastern Scythian remains have been found in an excellent state of preservation in the Altai mountains, with soft tissues such as skin and hair preserved. From the Pazyryk valley, Scythian remains show a variety of hair colors, ranging from black to bright chestnut. Mummified Scythian warriors from the Ukok plateau and Mongolia had blond hair.

Preserved skin tissue also reveals that the eastern Scythians had tattoos. Tattooing is not thought to have been practiced by western Scythians.

== Genetics ==
The genetics of remains from Scythian-identified cultures show broad general patterns, among these are remarkably different histories for men and women. Significant genetic differences were found between the Eastern Scythians and the Western Scythians of the Pontic steppe. The two groups appear to have been of completely different paternal origins, with almost no paternal gene flow between them. On the other hand, there is strong evidence of shared maternal DNA between Scythian cultures, indicating maternal geneflow from East Eurasia to West Eurasia.

The Western Scythians had Y-DNA haplogroups such as R1a, R1b, E1b, I2a, Q1a and J2a, and the Eastern Scythians had R1a, N and Q1a.

The maternal lineages among Scythians are diverse, showing a mixture of Eastern and West Eurasian lineages, with increasing East Asian mixture in the Iron Age. In Western Scythians, West Eurasian maternal lineages are 62.5–82% of the total, while East Eurasian maternal lineages are 18–37.5%. In a sample of Eastern Scythians from Tuva, the maternal lineages are nearly equally divided between Western and East Eurasian sources. The East Eurasian maternal lineages were likely brought by individuals sharing affinities with modern-day Nganasan people, as well as the ancient Okunev culture.

=== Ethnogenesis ===
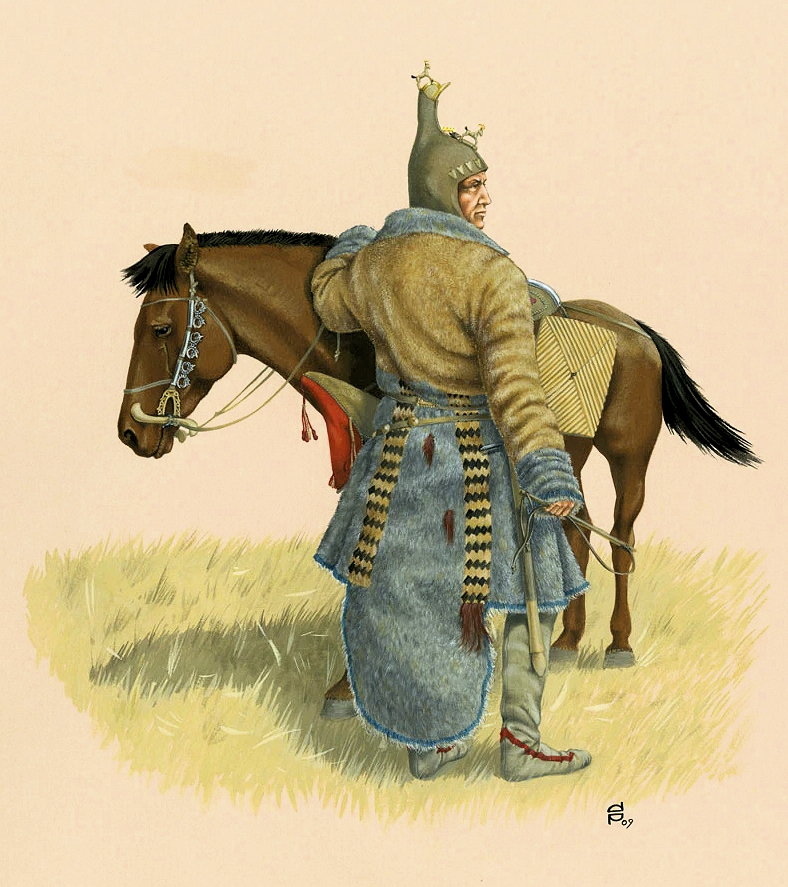
Reconstruction of a Saka Scythian, found in the kurgan Olon-Kurin-Gol 10 in Pazyryk, Altai Mountains, Mongolia.

The Scythians represent a "multitude of horse-warrior nomad" groups, which emerged from Bronze and Iron Age Central Asians (Western Steppe Herders or "Steppe_MLBA") who mixed with an East Asian-derived population represented by Khövsgöl LBA groups, giving rise to the various "Scythian cultures". Different Scythian groups arose locally, rather than through migration patterns. As a whole, Scythians can be modeled as a mixture between West Eurasian sources, primarily Western Steppe Herders and BMAC-like groups, with additional amounts of mixture from a population represented by the Khövsgöl LBA peoples of East Eurasian origin. Previous suggested mixture sources represented by other modern "East Eurasian proxies", such as Han Chinese or Nganasans, failed and were less reliable than Khövsgöl sources. Scythian Steppe populations display genetic heterogeneity along a west-to-east cline, with Eastern Scythians having higher genetic diversity. Eastern Scythians around the Altai Mountains were of multiple origins and originated from a mixture event in the Bronze Age. The Eastern Scythians genetically formed from mixture between Western Steppe Herder sources (which could be associated with different cultures such as Sintashta, Srubnaya, and Andronovo) and a specific East Eurasian source that was already present during the LBA in the neighboring northern Mongolia region. Eastern Scythians did not belong to a single genetic or cultural cluster, while Western Scythians fall in or close to the European cluster.

A later different Eastern influx, starting during the Middle Iron Age to post-Iron Age period, is evident in three outlier samples of the Tasmola culture (Tasmola Birlik) and one of the Pazyryk culture (Pazyryk Berel), which displayed c. 70–83% additional Ancient Northeast Asian ancestry represented by the Neolithic Devil's Gate Cave specimen, suggesting them to be recent migrants from further east. The same additional eastern ancestry is found among the later groups of Huns (Hun Berel 300CE, Hun elite 350CE), and the Karakaba remains (830CE). At the same time, western Sarmatian-like and minor additional BMAC-like ancestry spread eastwards, with a Saka-associated sample from southeastern Kazakhstan (Konyr Tobe 300CE) displaying around 85% Sarmatian and 15% BMAC ancestry. Sarmatians are modeled to derive primarily from the preceding Western Steppe Herders of the Pontic–Caspian steppe.

=== Western Scythian culture genetics ===
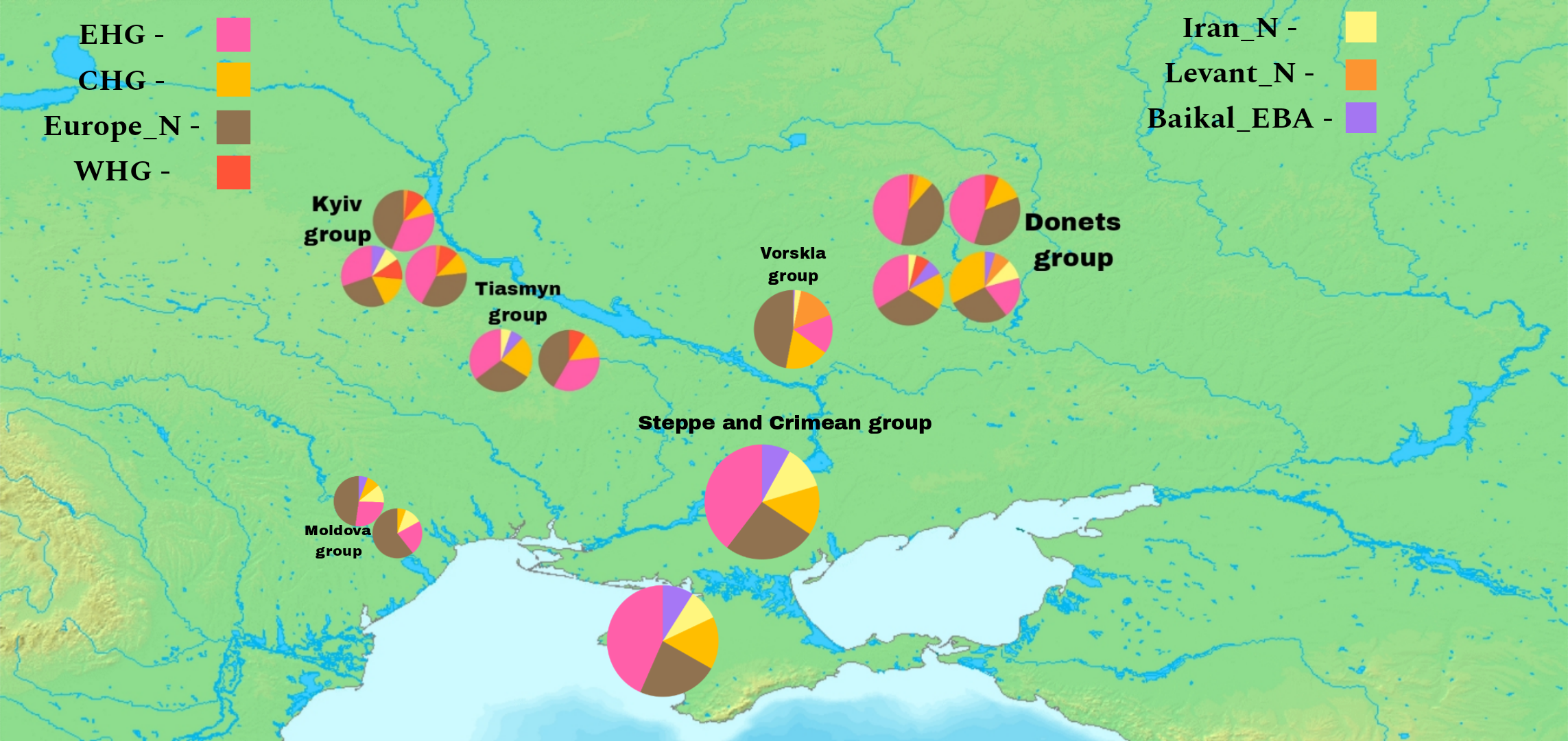
Autosomal DNA Western Scythians

Initially, the Western Scythians carried only West Eurasian maternal haplogroups, but the frequency of East Eurasian haplogroups rises to 18–26% in samples dated from the 6th-2nd centuries BC. Among the Western Scythians discovered at Rostov-on-Don, in European Russia, East Eurasian maternal haplogroups make up 37.5% of the total. These results possibly suggest the increasing presence of East Eurasian women in Western Scythian populations, although autosomal genetic evidence is needed to confirm this observation. In terms of paternal haplogroups, most Western Scythian remains from the North Pontic region have been observed to carry a specific clade haplogroup R1a, as well as Q1a, R1b, I2a, J2a and E1b.

Saag, et al. (2025) examined the remains of Iron Age Scythians obtained from archaeological sites of the area stretching from the northern Black Sea coast to the Middle Donets and Middle Dnieper. Similarly to Moldovan and Hungaryian Scythians, they were shown to carry admixture from earlier Lusatian, Hallstatt and Thracian ancestries. This Scythian-related gene pool remained generally homogeneous for almost 500 years, notwithstanding the sporadic presence of individuals of likely Ancient Northeast Asian ancestry represented by the Neolithic Devil's Gate Cave specimen, suggesting them to be recent migrants from further east.

Andreeva, et al. (2025) determined the paternal haplogroups of 36 Scythian males of the area stretching from the northern Black Sea coast to the Middle Don, dated the 7th century BC to the 1st century AD. 58.4% of the Y-DNA haplogroups belonged to varieties of haplogroup R1a (Y2631, Y934 and R-Y2) and R1b (R-Z2106). On the other hand, 22.2% belonged to haplogroup I2a (I-L801 and I-L702). The remaining individuals carried haplogroup G2a (G-S9409), J2a1 (J-Y26650 and J-FT72594), N1a (N-Z1934), and Q1a (Q-L940). Contrary to other more Eastern Scythian groups, these Pontic Scythian communities show continuity with different steppe-related Bronze Age groups, with minimal contributions from the Northeast Asian population represented by Khövsgöl LBA lineage. Specifically, the earliest Scythians, dating to the 7th to 5th centuries BC, overwhelmingly descended from the Andronovo culture populations, while later Scythians were closely associated with preceding steppe-related groups of Srubnaya culture and can be modeled as direct descendants of them.

Most of the Scythians were predicted to have brown or blond hair, with a notable proportion of blue-eyed individuals. Several Scythians had MC1R gene variants associated with red hair, freckles, and skin with a tendency to sunburn.

=== Eastern Scythian culture genetics ===
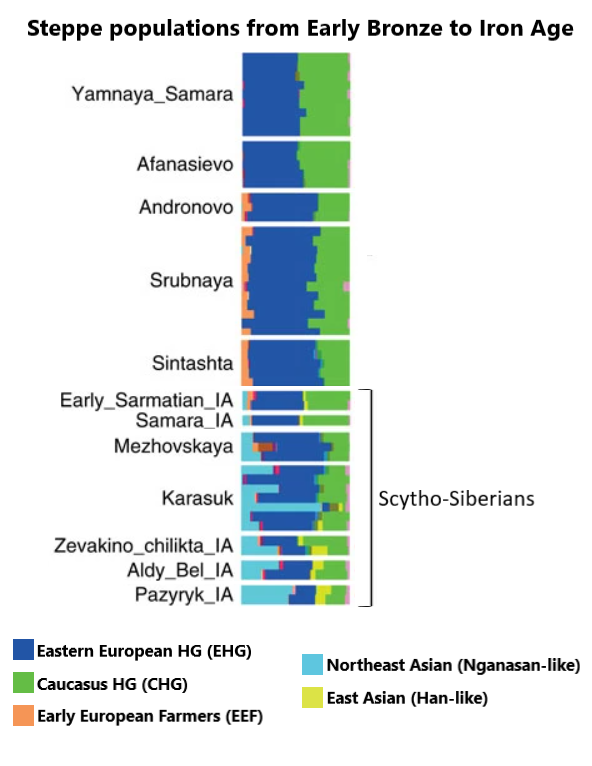
Genetic makeup of Bronze and Iron Age Steppe populations

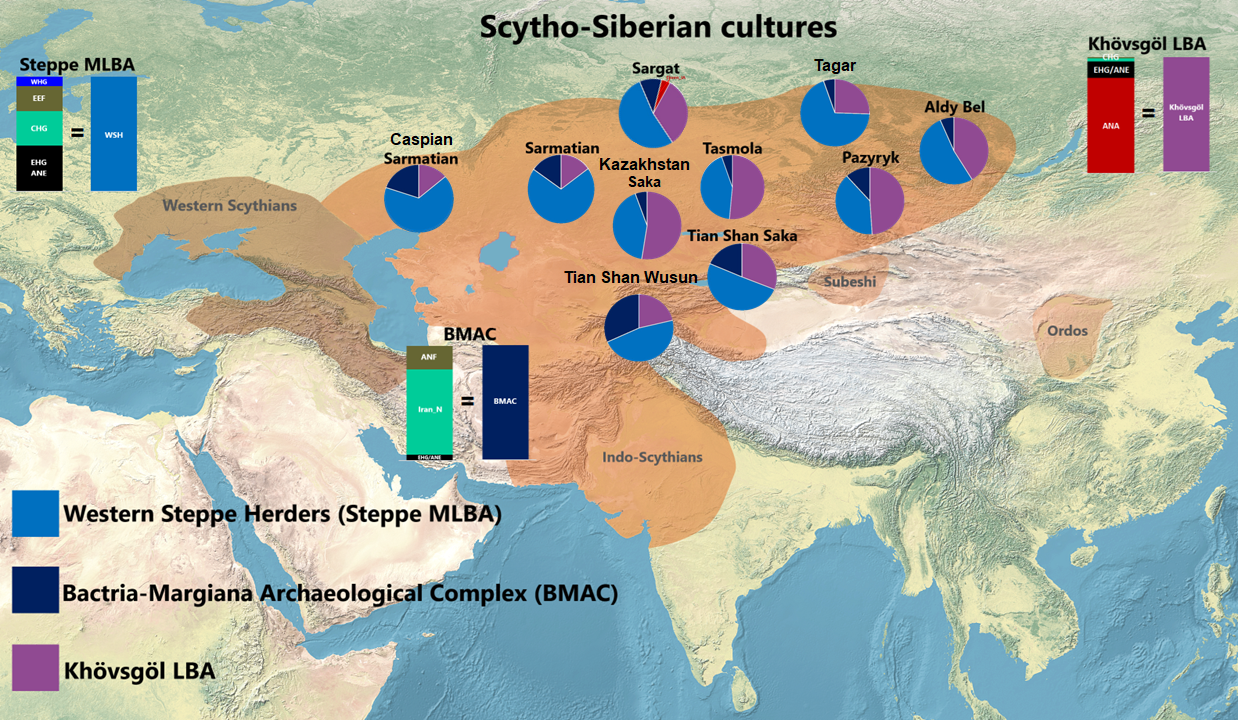
Map of Scythian cultures, including different Saka populations with genetic profiles, combining Steppe_MLBA, BMAC, and Khövsgöl LBA ancestries.

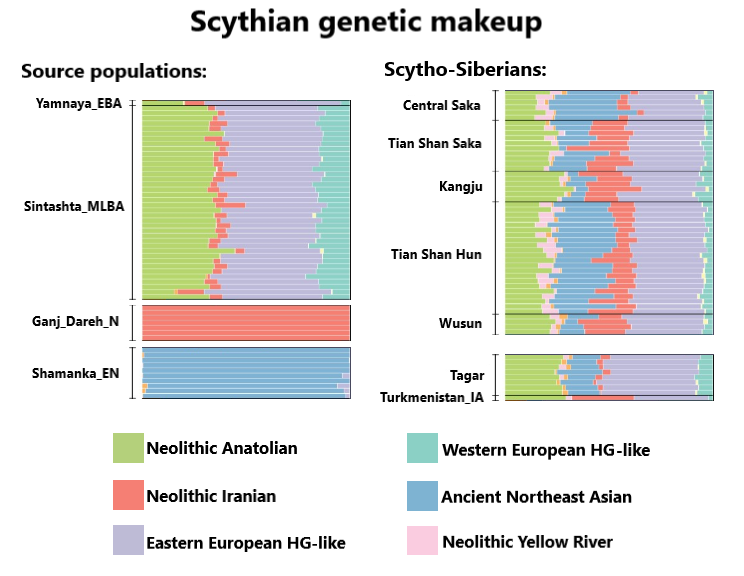
Genetic makeup of Iron Age Central Asian Scythians. The three main ancestry components are shown in green, red and violet representing the ancestries maximized in Anatolian farmers, Iranian farmers, and Hunter Gatherers from West Siberia, respectively.

Keyser et al. in 2009 studied the haplotypes and haplogroups of 26 ancient human specimens from the Krasnoyarsk area in Siberia dated from between the middle of the 2nd millennium BC and the 4th century AD (Scythian and Sarmatian timeframe). Nearly all subjects belonged to haplogroup R-M17. The authors suggest that their data shows that between the Bronze and the Iron Ages the constellation of populations known variously as Scythians, Andronovians, etc. were blue- (or green-) eyed, fair-skinned and light-haired people who might have played a role in the early development of the Tarim Basin civilisation. Moreover, this study found that they were genetically more closely related to modern populations in eastern Europe than those of central and southern Asia.

Pilipenko (2018) studied mtDNA from remains of the Tagar culture, which was part of the Scytho-Siberian world. Although found in Khakassia, at the eastern extreme of the Eurasian steppe, remains from the early stage of the Tagar culture were found to be closely related to those of contemporary Scythians on the Pontic-Caspian steppe far to the west, exhibiting both West Eurasian and East Eurasian lineages. However, the fossils from the middle stage of the Tagar culture showed a strong increase in East Eurasian maternal lineages, increasing from 35% to nearly 45% by the middle stage. The mtDNA haplogroups C and D increased from 8.7 to 37.8%.

In May 2018, a genetic study published in Nature examined the remains of twenty-eight Inner Asian Sakas buried between ca. 900 BC to AD 1, compromising eight Sakas of southern Siberia (Tagar culture), eight Sakas of the central steppe (Tasmola culture), and twelve Sakas of the Tian Shan. The six samples of Y-DNA extracted from the Tian Shan Saka belonged to the West Eurasian haplogroups R (four samples), R1 and R1a1. Four samples of Y-DNA extracted from central Steppe sakas belonged to haplogroup R1 and R1a, while one individual belonged to haplogroup E1b1b.

Mary, et al. (2019) studied the genetics of remains from the Aldy-Bel culture in and around Tuva in central Asia, adjacent to western Mongolia; the Aldy-Bel culture is considered one of the Scytho-Siberian cultures. The authors also analyzed the maternal haplogroups of 26 Siberian Scythian remains from Arzhan. 50% of the remains carried an East Eurasian haplogroup, while 50% carried a West Eurasian haplogroup. In contrast to the paternal lineages, the maternal lineages were extremely diverse. The most common lineages were variants of haplogroup C4.

Mary, et al. (2019) also determined the paternal haplogroups of 11 Siberian Scythian males of the Aldy-Bel culture. 82% of the haplogroups belonged to varieties of haplogroup R1a. On the other hand, 9% belonged to haplogroup Q1b, which was found in Bronze Age samples from the Altai Mountains. Additionally, one specimen (9%) carried haplogroup N-M231, which is associated with Neolithic remains from Northern China. The 5 male samples from the Sagly-Bazhy culture were found to be carriers of the East Eurasian haplogroups Q-L54.

The Scythian groups of the Pontic Steppe and South Siberia had significantly different paternal genetics, which suggests that the Pontic and South Siberian Scythians had completely different paternal origins, with almost no paternal gene flow between them. (Note: "The absence of R1b lineages in the Scytho-Siberian individuals tested so far and their presence in the North Pontic Scythians suggest that these two groups had a completely different paternal lineage makeup with nearly no gene flow from male carriers between them.")

Since the Middle Iron Age onwards, the Eastern Scythians received additional Northern East Asian geneflow, paralleling the emergence of Huns, which shared this newly arrived component. There was also an increase in Sarmatian and BMAC-like ancestries.

=== Modern groups with Scythian ancestry ===
Unterländer, et al. (2017) found that eastern Scythians share closest genetic similarities with modern-day speakers of Siberian Turkic languages, such as Telengits, Tubalars, and Tofalars, which supports a "multi-regional origin" of the eastern Iron Age Scythians. Eastern Scythians share partial ancestry with contemporary Turkic, Mongolian, and Siberian groups in eastern Eurasia, while evidence of genetic affinity with Scythians is strongest among modern speakers of the Kipchak languages. There is increasing evidence for a partial continuity from the eastern Scythians to the Turkic-speakers of the Altai region, as well as modern Uralic and Paleosiberian peoples. Turkic-speaking Central Asians can be described as having formed from mixture between local Scythian-like groups, displaying their highest genetic affinity to modern-day Tajiks, and "Eastern Steppe Xiongnu" groups during the Iron Age. The mixture with West Eurasian sources was found to be "in accordance with the linguistically documented language borrowing in Turkic languages".

Scythians can broadly be differentiated into "Western" and "Eastern" sub-groups. Contemporary descendants of western Scythian groups are found among various groups in the Caucasus, Russia and Central Asia (spread across many Iranian and other Indo-European speaking groups), while Eastern Scythian affinity is more widespread but nearly exclusively found among modern Turkic-speaking as well as Uralic and Paleosiberian peoples. Overall, modern Tajiks and Yaghnobis were found to display the strongest genetic continuity with the Bronze and Iron Age populations of Central Asia (Indo-Iranians).

Western Scythians of the area stretching from the northern Black Sea coast to the Middle Don, shared the highest levels of alleles with modern Eastern Baltic (Lithuanian, Estonian) and Northwestern Russian populations. Similarly, the Scythian maternal haplogroups are mostly found in modern carriers from Europe, predominantly in Poland, Denmark, and the northwestern part of Russia.

== See also ==
- Eurasian nomads
- Early Slavs

== Bibliography ==
- Alekseev, Andrei (2017). "8 The Scythians and their cultural contacts". Scythians: Warriors of ancient Siberia. The BP Exhibition. London, UK: British Museum; Thames & Hudson – via Academia.edu. — Good; free download (with registration).
- Di Cosmo, Nicola (1999). "The Northern Frontier in Pre-Imperial China (1,500–221 BC)". In Loewe, Michael; Shaughnessy, Edward L. (eds.). The Cambridge History of Ancient China: From the origins of civilization to 221 BC. Cambridge University Press. pp. 885–996. ISBN 0-521-47030-7.
- David, Bruno; McNiven, Ian J. (2018). The Oxford Handbook of the Archaeology and Anthropology of Rock Art. Oxford University Press. ISBN 978-0-19-060735-7.
- Davis-Kimball, Jeannine; Bashilov, Vladimir A.; Yablonsky, Leonid T. [in Russian] (1995). Nomads of the Eurasian Steppes in the Early Iron Age. Zinat Press. ISBN 978-1-885979-00-1.
- Ivanchik, Askold (25 April 2018). "Scythians". Encyclopædia Iranica.
- Jacobson, Esther (1995). The Art of the Scythians: The interpenetration of cultures at the edge of the Hellenic world. BRILL. ISBN 90-04-09856-9.
- Juras, Anna (7 March 2017). "Diverse origin of mitochondrial lineages in Iron Age Black Sea Scythians". Nature Communications. 7 43950. Bibcode:2017NatSR...743950J. doi:10.1038/srep43950. PMC 5339713. PMID 28266657.
- Järve, Mari (22 July 2019). "Shifts in the genetic landscape of the western Eurasian steppe associated with the beginning and end of the Scythian dominance". Current Biology. 29 (14): 2430–2441. Bibcode:2019CBio...29E2430J. doi:10.1016/j.cub.2019.06.019. PMID 31303491.
- Kennedy, Maev (30 May 2017). "British Museum to go more than skin deep with Scythian exhibition". The Guardian.
- Krzewińska, Maja (3 October 2018). "Ancient genomes suggest the eastern Pontic-Caspian steppe as the source of western Iron Age nomads". Nature Communications. 4 (10) eaat4457. Bibcode:2018SciA....4.4457K. doi:10.1126/sciadv.aat4457. PMC 6223350. PMID 30417088.
- Mary, Laura (28 March 2019). "Genetic kinship and admixture in Iron Age Scytho-Siberians". Human Genetics. 138 (4): 411–423. doi:10.1007/s00439-019-02002-y. PMID 30923892. S2CID 85542410.
- Mathieson, Iain; Reich, David (14 March 2015). "Eight thousand years of natural selection in Europe". bioRxiv 10.1101/016477.
- Mathieson, Iain (24 December 2015). "Genome-wide patterns of selection in 230 ancient Eurasians". Nature. 528 (7583): 499–503. Bibcode:2015Natur.528..499M. doi:10.1038/nature16152. PMC 4918750. PMID 26595274.
- Nicholson, Oliver (2018). "Scythians (Saka)". The Oxford Dictionary of Late Antiquity. Oxford University Press. pp. 1346–1347. ISBN 978-0-19-256246-3.
- Pilipenko, Aleksandr S. (20 September 2018). "Maternal genetic features of the Iron Age Tagar population from southern Siberia (1st millennium BC)". PLOS One. 13 (9) e0204062. Bibcode:2018PLoSO..1304062P. doi:10.1371/journal.pone.0204062. PMC 6147448. PMID 30235269.
- Rolle, Renate [in German] (1989). The World of the Scythians. University of California Press. ISBN 0-520-06864-5.
- Simpson, St. John (2017). "The Scythians: Discovering the nomad-warriors of Siberia". Current World Archaeology. 84: 16–21.
- Unterländer, Martina (3 March 2017). "Ancestry and demography and descendants of Iron Age nomads of the Eurasian Steppe". Nature Communications. 8 14615. Bibcode:2017NatCo...814615U. doi:10.1038/ncomms14615. PMC 5337992. PMID 28256537.
- Watson, William (October 1972). "The Chinese contribution to eastern nomad culture in the pre-Han and early Han periods". World Archaeology. 4 (2). Taylor & Francis: 139–149. doi:10.1080/00438243.1972.9979528. JSTOR 123972.
- West, Stephanie (2002). "Scythians". In Bakker, Egbert J.; de Jong, Irene J.F.; van Wees, Hans (eds.). Brill's Companion to Herodotus. Brill. pp. 437–456. ISBN 978-90-04-21758-4.
