= Shi Wei =

Shi Wei may refer to:

- Shi Wei (handballer) (born 1970), Chinese handball player
- Wei Shyy, President of the Hong Kong University of Science and Technology
- Chen Xuezhao, pen name Shi Wei

== See also ==
- Shiwei (disambiguation)
