= Linhu =

Línhú (临湖) may refer to the following locations in China:

- Linhu Subdistrict, Sujiatun District, Shenyang, Liaoning

Towns

- Linhu, Woyang County, Anhui
- Linhu, Suzhou, in Wuzhong District, Suzhou, Jiangsu
- Linhu, Yushan County, in Yushan County, Jiangxi

People

- Linhu (people) (林胡), a Xirong/Xiongnu tribe in Inner Mongolia at early Zhou Dynasty c. 1000 BC

== See also ==
- Lin Hu (disambiguation)
- Linghu
