= Lin Hu =

Lin Hu may refer to:

- Lin Hu (warlord) (1887–1960), warlord of the Old Guangxi clique
- Lin Hu (general) (1927–2018), deputy commander of the PLA Air Force

== See also ==
- Linhu (disambiguation)
