= Di people =

Di people may refer to:

- Di (狄), also called Beidi (北狄) or Northern Di, several Zhou Dynasty ethnic groups living in northern China
- Di (Five Barbarians) (氐), one of the Five Barbarians of the Sixteen Kingdoms period.
