= Shiwei =

Shiwei may refer to:

- Shiwei people, a historic Mongolic people
- Shiwei, Inner Mongolia, a township in Ergun City, Inner Mongolia

== Given names ==
- Che Shiwei (born 1996), Chinese footballer
- Chen Shiwei, Chinese track and field athlete
- Pan Shiwei (born 1955), politician in Taiwan
- Wang Shiwei (1906-1947), Chinese literary writer

== See also ==
- Shi Wei (disambiguation)
