= Xi people =

Xi people may refer to:

- Xianbei
- Xibe people
- Bái-Xí, ancient Turkic Tiele people, steppes people located in current northeast China. In 2017, Singaporean scholar Yang Shao-yun identified as Barsils.
- Kumo Xi, ancient Mongolic people, steppes people located in current northeast China
- Ancient relative of Kamboja people of Cambodia and India
