= Loufan =

Loufan may refer to:

- Loufan (tribe) (樓煩), a Xiongnu-associated nomadic tribe; see Loufan County, Shanxi Province, China
- Loufan Commandery (樓煩郡, part of modern Xinzhou), former commandery in what is now Xinzhou Prefecture, Shanxi, China; see Liu Wuzhou
- Loufan (town) (樓煩), the seat of Loufan Commandery; see Chen Xi (rebel)
- Loufan County (娄烦), a county of Taiyuan Prefecture, Shanxi, China

== See also ==
- Luopan (羅盤), a Chinese magnetic compass
- Louban (樓班), ruler of the Wuhuan tribes in northern China in the Eastern Han dynasty
