= Shule =

Shule may refer to:

- Shule Kingdom in Kashgar, an ancient kingdom in Xinjiang, China
- Shule County, a county in Xinjiang, China
- Shule, a minor figure in the Book of Mormon
- Synagogue (Shul or Shule), a Jewish house of worship
