= Nicola Di Cosmo =

American historian

Nicola Di Cosmo (Chinese: 狄宇宙; pinyin: Dí Yǔzhòu;) is the Luce Foundation Professor in East Asian Studies at the Institute for Advanced Study. His main field of research is the history of the relations between China and Inner Asia from prehistory to the modern period.

Di Cosmo earned a Ph.D. degree from the Department of Uralic and Altaic Studies of Indiana University in 1991. He was a research fellow at the University of Cambridge from 1989 to 1992, Rockefeller Fellow and lecturer at Indiana University from 1992 to 1993, assistant professor of Harvard University from 1993 to 1997, and taught at the University of Canterbury from 1998 to 2003. In 2003, he was appointed Luce Foundation Professor in East Asian Studies at the Institute for Advanced Study. In 2015, he taught as a visiting professor at New York University Shanghai. He is currently a faculty member of the Weatherhead East Asian Institute.

== Works ==
Di Cosmo has published on the early history of China's relations with steppe nomads and edited several books.

- (2002) "Ancient China and Its Enemies: The Rise of Nomadic Power in East Asian History," : Cambridge University Press.
- (2003) "Manchu-Mongol Relations on the Eve of the Qing Conquest," : Brill.
