= Linhu, Suzhou =

Town in Suzhou, Jiangsu, China

Coordinates: 31°7′26″N 120°27′58″E

Linhu Town (Chinese: 临湖镇; pinyin: Línhúzhèn) is located in the southern part of Suzhou City, China, bordered by Lake Tai to the east and west. It was formed in 2006 by the merger of the former Puzhuang (Chinese: 浦庄镇; pinyin: Pǔzhuāngzhèn) and Ducun (Chinese: 渡村镇; pinyin: Dùcūnzhèn) towns. Linhu covers an area of some 55.5 square kilometres (21.4 sq mi), and had a resident population of 43,000 in 2016.
