= Miners' Glory Monument =

Monument in Karaganda

- Шахтер даңқы монументі
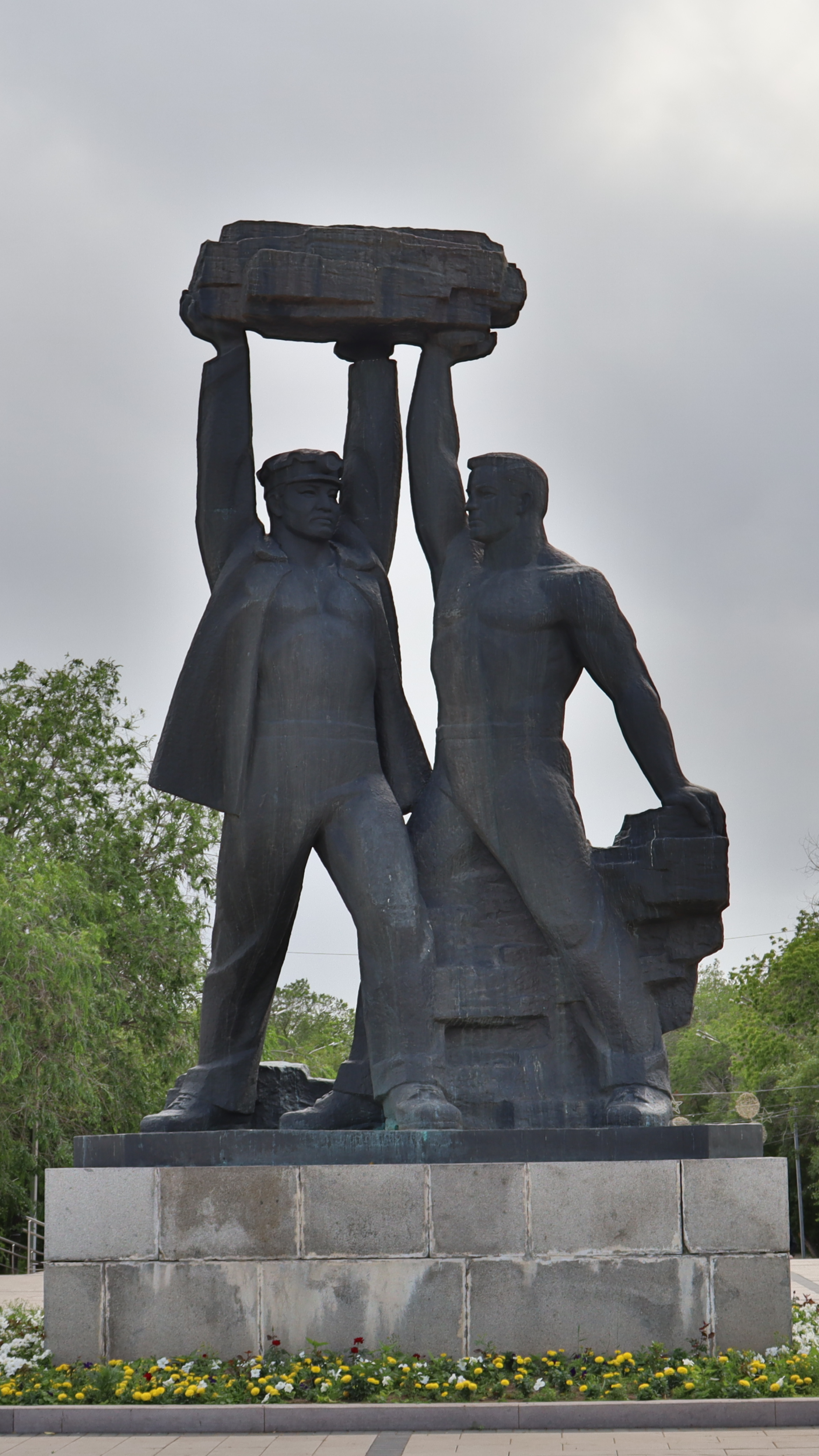
- An image showing the Miners' Glory Monument
- Interactive map of Miners' Glory Monument
- Location: Karaganda, Kazakhstan
- Coordinates: 49°48′32.6″N 73°04′57.6″E
- Designer: Anatolii Bilyk, Anatolii Malkov
- Height: 11 metres
- Completion date: 1974

The Miners' Glory Monument (Kazakh: Шахтер даңқы монументі) is one of the symbols of the city of Karaganda. It was erected to commemorate the 2 million tons of coal produced by the Karaganda coal basin. The monument is located opposite of the Miners' Palace of Culture, and is cast in bronze.

== History ==
In 1969, a competition for the best project of the future monument was announced. There were 11 contenders, including sculptors from Minsk, Sverdlovsk Oblast and Almaty. Sculptors Anatolii Bilyk and Anatolii Malkov won. Their project was taken as a base and minor revisions were implemented. Bilyk worked on the sculpture for a year in Moscow. Several years were spent on approvals, preparation and casting as well as installation.

The monument was erected in 1974. Images of the monument are often printed on headlines, cards and envelopes.

== Description ==
The monument weighs 20 tonnes and is cast in bronze from Saint Petersburg, while the pedestal is made of concrete, and is lined with granite blocks. The monument depicts two men, a Russian and a Kazakh lifting a seam of coal, representing the coal industry and friendship between peoples. The stone and concrete for the pedestal was processed in Almaty.

Bilyk's idea for the monument was formed from his impression of the work of the miners. On the 31st mine, Bilyk spoke with miners and made sketches for the monument.

== See also ==
- Miners' Palace of Culture
- Karaganda Regional Kazakh Drama Theatre named after Säken Seifullin
- Karaganda
