= List of most populous cities in Kazakhstan =

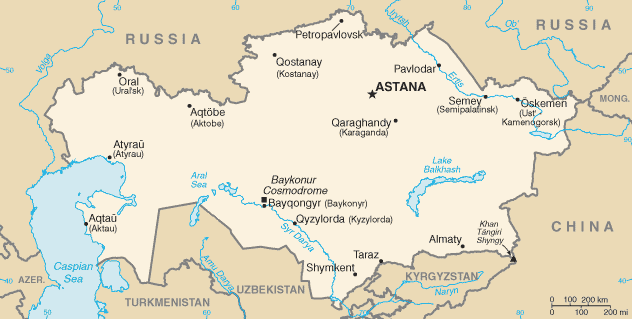
Cities in Kazakhstan

This is a list of all cities and settlements in Kazakhstan with a population of at least fifty thousand people as of official population estimates in 2023. The three largest cities are Almaty, Astana (the national capital), and Shymkent; as cities of republican significance, they are administratively independent and belong to no region. Two of the listed settlements, Zashagan and Beyneu, are officially designated as villages rather than cities.

== List ==
Rank	City or Settlement	Population (January 2023 estimate)	Population (October 2021 census)	Change	Region
1	Almaty	2,161,797	2,030,285	+6.48%	–
2	Astana	1,354,507	1,234,042	+9.76%	–
3	Shymkent	1,192,120	1,112,478	+7.16%	–
4	Aktobe	559,911	540,493	+3.59%	Aktobe
5	Karaganda	515,632	508,824	+1.34%	Karaganda
6	Taraz	427,356	418,368	+2.15%	Jambyl
7	Oskemen	352,894	349,463	+0.98%	East Kazakhstan
8	Pavlodar	334,096	333,190	+0.27%	Pavlodar
9	Atyrau	316,468	306,548	+3.24%	Atyrau
10	Semey	308,143	303,210	+1.63%	Abai
11	Kyzylorda	278,638	271,309	+2.70%	Kyzylorda
12	Kostanay	264,466	258,990	+2.11%	Kostanay
13	Aktau	263,893	251,855	+4.78%	Mangystau
14	Oral	253,773	247,467	+2.55%	West Kazakhstan
15	Petropavl	222,636	222,076	+0.25%	North Kazakhstan
16	Turkistan	220,159	207,605	+6.05%	Turkistan
17	Kokshetau	174,614	171,630	+1.74%	Akmola
18	Temirtau	171,893	171,019	+0.51%	Karagandy
19	Taldykorgan	168,686	165,325	+2.03%	Jetisu
20	Ekibastuz	129,000	129,748	−0.58%	Pavlodar
21	Rudny	112,078	112,052	+0.02%	Kostanay
22	Jezkazgan	89,092	88,320	+0.87%	Ulytau
23	Kaskelen	82,393	79,482	+3.66%	Almaty
24	Kentau	74,474	72,573	+2.62%	Turkistan
25	Zhanaozen	74,360	72,425	+2.67%	Mangystau
26	Balkash	73,730	73,785	−0.07%	Karagandy
27	Satbayev	68,395	67,456	+1.39%	Ulytau
28	Kulsary	65,963	64,458	+2.33%	Atyrau
29	Talgar	64,895	63,883	+1.58%	Almaty
30	Saryagash	61,485	59,606	+3.15%	Turkistan
31	Zashagan	61,224	58,356	+4.91%	West Kazakhstan
32	Beyneu	57,682	55,842	+3.30%	Mangystau
33	Qonayev	55,200	54,245	+1.76%	Almaty
34	Jarkent	52,819	52,361	+0.87%	Jetisu
35	Arys	51,996	50,370	+3.23%	Turkistan
36	Qosshy	51,664	48,630	+6.24%	Akmola
37.	Arys	43,912	23,567	+86.33%	Turkistan Province
38.	Talgar	43,190	43,353	−0.38%	Almaty Province
39.	Jarkent	42,598	32,656	+30.44%	Almaty Region
40.	Lisakovsk	40,440	35,161	+15.01%	Kostanay Province
41.	Baikonur	39,323	28,776	+36.65%	Kyzylorda Province
42.	Ayagoz	38,496	38,470	+0.07%	East Kazakhstan Region
43.	Shu	36,496	34,999	+4.28%	Jambyl Province
44.	Zyryanovsk	36,462	43,894	−16.93%	East Kazakhstan Region
45.	Kandyagash	35,392	25,553	+38.50%	Aktobe Province
46.	Aksay	35,341	28,953	+22.06%	West Kazakhstan Region
47.	Zhetikara	34,704	36,359	−4.55%	Kostanay Province
48.	Esik	33,731	31,254	+7.93%	Almaty Province
49.	Aral	32,991	30,801	+7.11%	Kyzylorda Province
50.	Tekel	31,784	23,982	+32.53%	Almaty Province
51.	Karatau	30,207	28,281	+6.81%	Jambyl Province
52.	Saryagash	30,146	25,914	+16.33%	Turkistan Province
53.	Atbasar	28,735	32,288	−11.00%	Akmola Province
54.	Arkalyk	28,384	45,736	−37.94%	Kostanay Province
55.	Abay	28,261	33,066	−14.53%	Karagandy Province
56.	Shardara	28,209	25,452	+10.83%	Turkistan Province
57.	Shalkar	27,913	26,329	+6.02%	Aktobe Province
58.	Khromtau	26,901	21,740	+23.74%	Aktobe Province
59.	Lenger	23,756	22,038	+7.80%	Turkistan Province
60.	Ushtobe	22,990	22,472	+2.31%	Almaty Province
61.	Janatas	22,307	25,927	−13.96%	Jambyl Province
62.	Alga	20,429	15,372	+32.90%	Aktobe Province
63.	Shemonaikha	18,212	19,924	−8.59%	East Kazakhstan Region
64.	Makinsk	17,761	18,540	−4.20%	Akmola Province
65.	Usharal	17,218	15,379	+11.96%	Almaty Province
66.	Zaisan	15,883	16,021	−0.86%	East Kazakhstan Region
67.	Akkol	13,690	15,682	−12.70%	Akmola Province
68.	Priozersk	13,308	11,033	+20.62%	Karagandy Province
69.	Kurchatov	12,372	9,305	+32.96%	East Kazakhstan Region
70.	Embi	11,768	12,345	−4.67%	Aktobe Province
71.	Sarkand	11,563	15,347	−24.66%	Almaty Province
72.	Taiynsha	11,422	13,233	−13.69%	North Kazakhstan Region
73.	Esil	10,584	13,096	−19.18%	Akmola Province
74.	Ereymentau	9,111	15,087	−39.61%	Akmola Province
75.	Serebryansk	8,581	11,903	−27.91%	East Kazakhstan Region
76.	Karkaraly	8,396	8,773	−4.30%	Karagandy Province
77.	Karazhal	8,358	12,658	−33.97%	Karagandy Province
78.	Bulayevo	7,723	9,638	−19.87%	North Kazakhstan Region
79.	Charsk	7,430	9,482	−21.64%	East Kazakhstan Region
80.	Sergeyev	7,344	9,470	−22.45%	North Kazakhstan Region
81.	Mamlyut	7,024	9,018	−22.11%	North Kazakhstan Region
82.	Kazaly	6,820	7,298	−6.55%	Kyzylorda Province
83.	Derzhavinsk	6,323	7,868	−19.64%	Akmola Province
84.	Fort-Shevchenko	5,559	3,624	+53.39%	Mangystau Province
85.	Stepnyak	3,738	5,329	−29.86%	Akmola Province
86.	Temir	2,162	2,310	−6.41%	Aktobe Province
87.	Zhem	1,761	1,142	+54.20%	Aktobe Province
