= Bugyly =

Mountain range in Kazakhstan

- Бұғылы
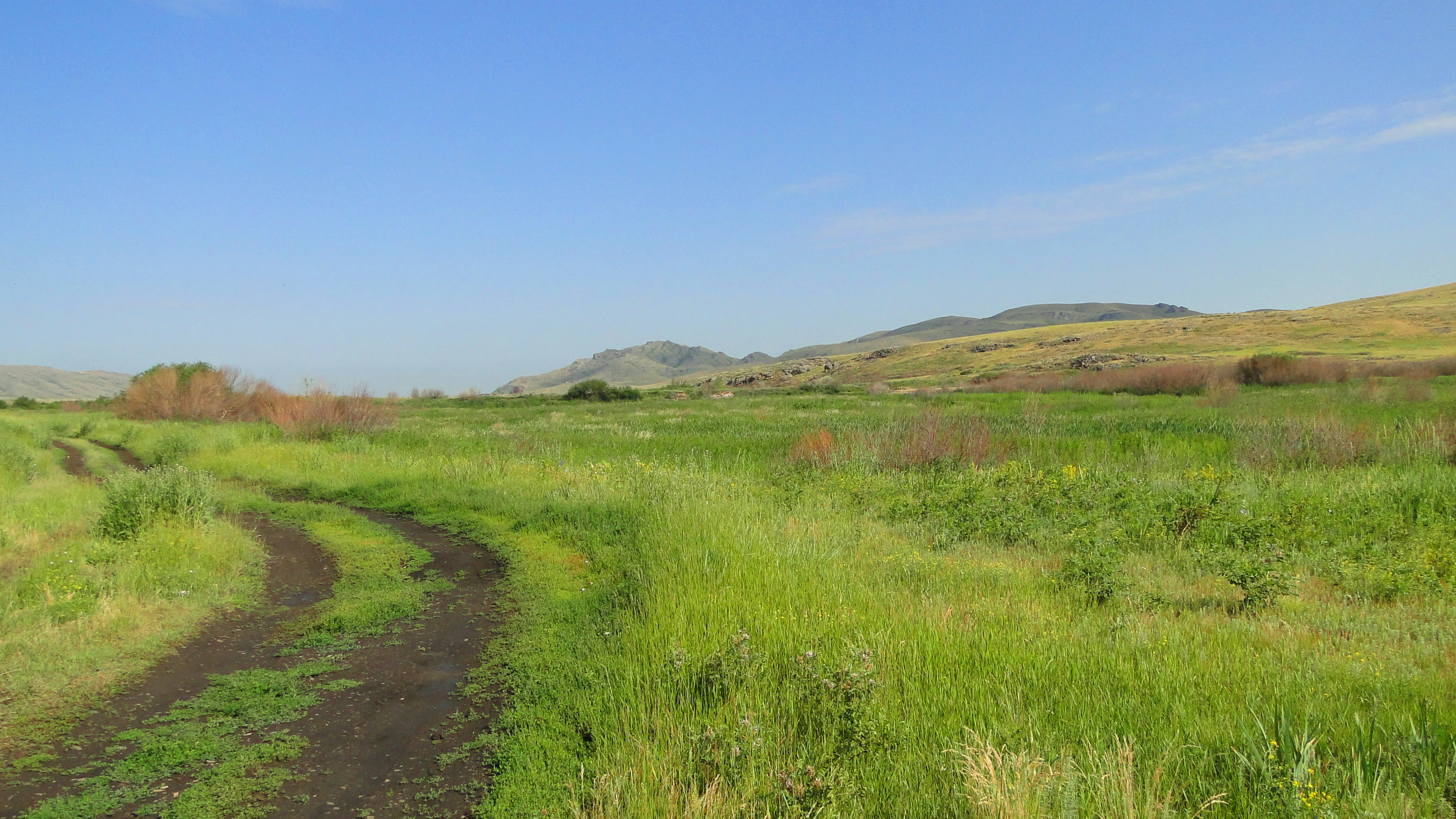
- Landscape of the range

Highest point
- Peak: Burkit
- Elevation: 1,184 m (3,885 ft)

Dimensions
- Length: 40 km (25 mi) NE / SW
- Width: 15 km (9.3 mi) NW / SE

Geography
- Location within Kazakhstan
- Location: Kazakhstan
- Range coordinates: 49°00′N 73°04′E
- Parent range: Kazakh Uplands

Geology
- Orogeny: Alpine orogeny
- Rock age: Carboniferous
- Rock type: Granite

Bugyly (Kazakh: Бұғылы) is a mountain range in Kazakhstan. Administratively the range is part of the Shet District, Karaganda region.

Bugyly is located near Saken Seifullin village (formerly named Zharyk). The range area is a weekend and leisure destination for Karaganda people. The Bugyly Nature Reserve is a 8,500 hectares (21,000 acres) protected area in the Bugyly and Zhaksy Tagyly ranges.

== Geography ==
Bugyly is one of the subranges of the Kazakh Upland system. The range stretches for a length of 40 kilometers (25 mi) from the southwest to the northeast. Its highest point is the 1,184 meters (3,885 ft) high Burkit. The mountains are of moderate height and have generally smooth, gentle slopes. River Sherubainura flows at the feet of the northeastern end of the Bugyly and some of its left tributaries originate in the range. The Zhaksy Tagyly (Жақсы Тағылы) range lies to the south of the southern end.

== See also ==
- Geography of Kazakhstan
