= Seal of Karaganda =

Symbol of city in Kazakhstan

- Adopted: 2007
- Designer: Aibek Begalin

The Seal of Karaganda (Kazakh: Қарағанды қаласының елтаңбасы) is the official symbol of the city of Karaganda, Kazakhstan. The author of the coat of arms is Aibek Begalin.

The first symbol of the city is associated with a mine. The next coat of arms of the city featured a marmot. In this form, the coat of arms existed until 2007. The new coat of arms was approved on July 18, 2007 at a meeting of the city maslikhat.

== Description ==
On the azure eastern shield in the center there is a soaring white golden eagle against the background of spoil tips and a shanyrak. On the inside of the shield there is a yellow ornament koshkar muiz. At the bottom under the golden eagle with a gold background there is an inscription with the name of the city in Kazakh. The inscription is made in red.

== Symbolism ==
The circle symbolizes infinity, perfection and completeness. The golden eagle on a blue background is the symbol of Saryarka. The golden eagle is a symbol of foresight, and the survey of vast spaces. The white color of the golden eagle signifies purity, sunlight and goodness.

The shanyrak symbolises peace and friendship between peoples. It also serves as the symbol of home and asylum.

Spoil tips are the symbol of the mines of Karaganda and the extraction of coal, as coal gave the opportunity for the city to develop.

== History ==
=== Seal in 1984 ===
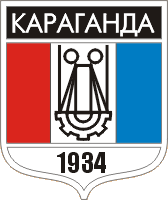
The first seal of Karaganda

For the 50th anniversary of the city of Karaganda, the city administration announced a competition to develop a series of seals. The work of graphic artist Nikolai Georgievich Rastopchin was chosen as the best. In 1984, a small edition of the anniversary badge was released.

The badge was a French shield divided into three in a column (red, white and blue) and inscribed in a rectangle. In the center of the shield is depicted a headframe with a gear, which is associated with the history of the emergence and development of the city. 1934 is the year when Karaganda received the status of a city.

=== Seal in 1991 ===
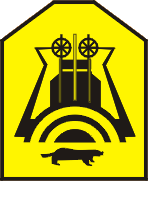
The seal of Karaganda from 1991 to 2007

In 1991, Karaganda got a new seal. The center also depicted a headframe, as well as a marmot running below. The colors of the emblem are gold and black. The author of the emblem is Tolegen Abylkasov, a member of the Union of Artists of Kazakhstan.

In the emblem, the author tried to reflect the legend that in pursuit of a marmot, a local shepherd boy, Appak Baizhanov, went far into the steppe and decided to warm himself by the fire, throwing a black stone lying on the ground into the fire, which turned out to be coal. The seal existed until 2007.

=== Seal in 2007 ===
The seal of Karaganda since 2007

In 2007, the Akimat announced a competition for the city's seal. The winner was Karaganda artist Aibek Begalin.

On July 18, 2007, the new seal was approved at a meeting of the Karaganda city maslikhat.

In 2014, a banner with the seal of Karaganda went into space and returned with the crew members of the Soyuz TMA-12M spacecraft.
