= Bugyly Nature Reserve =

Protected area in Kazakhstan

- Бұғылы қорықшасы
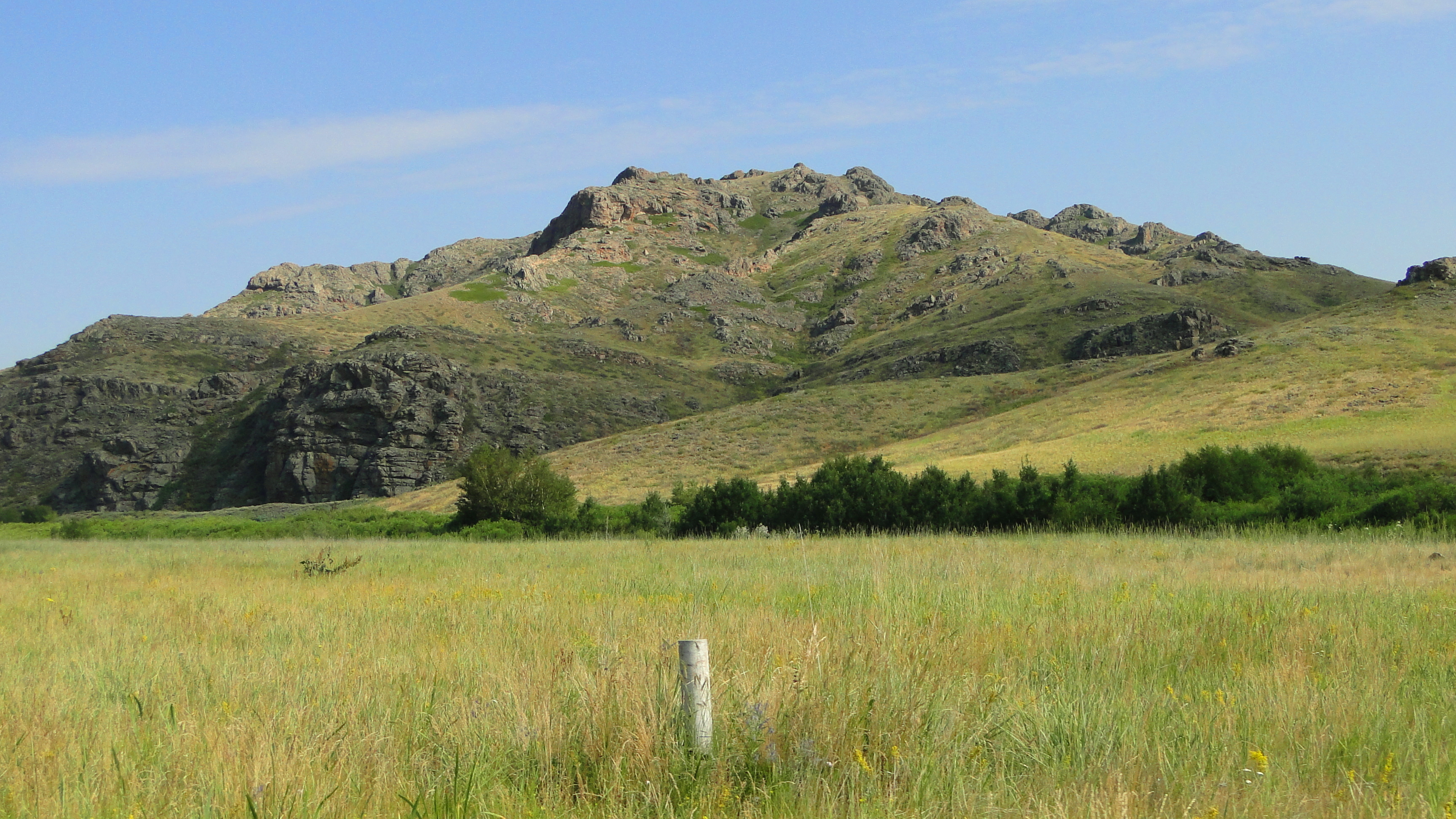
- Panorama of the nature reserve

- Location within Kazakhstan
- Interactive map of Bugyly Nature Reserve
- Type: Zoological reserve
- Location: Shet District, Karaganda Region, Kazakhstan
- Nearest city: Karaganda
- Coordinates: 49°00′N 73°04′E
- Area: 8,500 ha (85 km^{2})
- Created: 1976
- Operator: Main Department of Zapovedniks and Game Management - Republic of Kazakhstan

Bugyly Nature Reserve (Kazakh: Бұғылы қорықшасы, romanized: Būğyly qoryqşasy) is a protected area in the Kazakh Uplands, Kazakhstan. Administratively it is located in the Shet District of the Karaganda Region.

== Description ==
The Bugyly Nature Reserve protected area covers 8,500 ha (21,000 acres) of the Bugyly and Zhaksy Tagyly ranges. The landscape is made up of flat or undulating steppe, as well as two mountain ranges of moderate altitude. The vegetation includes low shrub and grasses, such as meadowsweet, Siberian peashrub, wormwood and feather grass. In the narrow river gorges birch, aspen, willow and raspberry thickets may be found. Among the animals protected by the reserve, the roe deer, deer, hare, badger, wolf, fox, grouse and partridge deserve mention.

== See also ==
- Kazakh Steppe
