= Sokyr =

River in Kazakhstan

Sokyr Соқыр
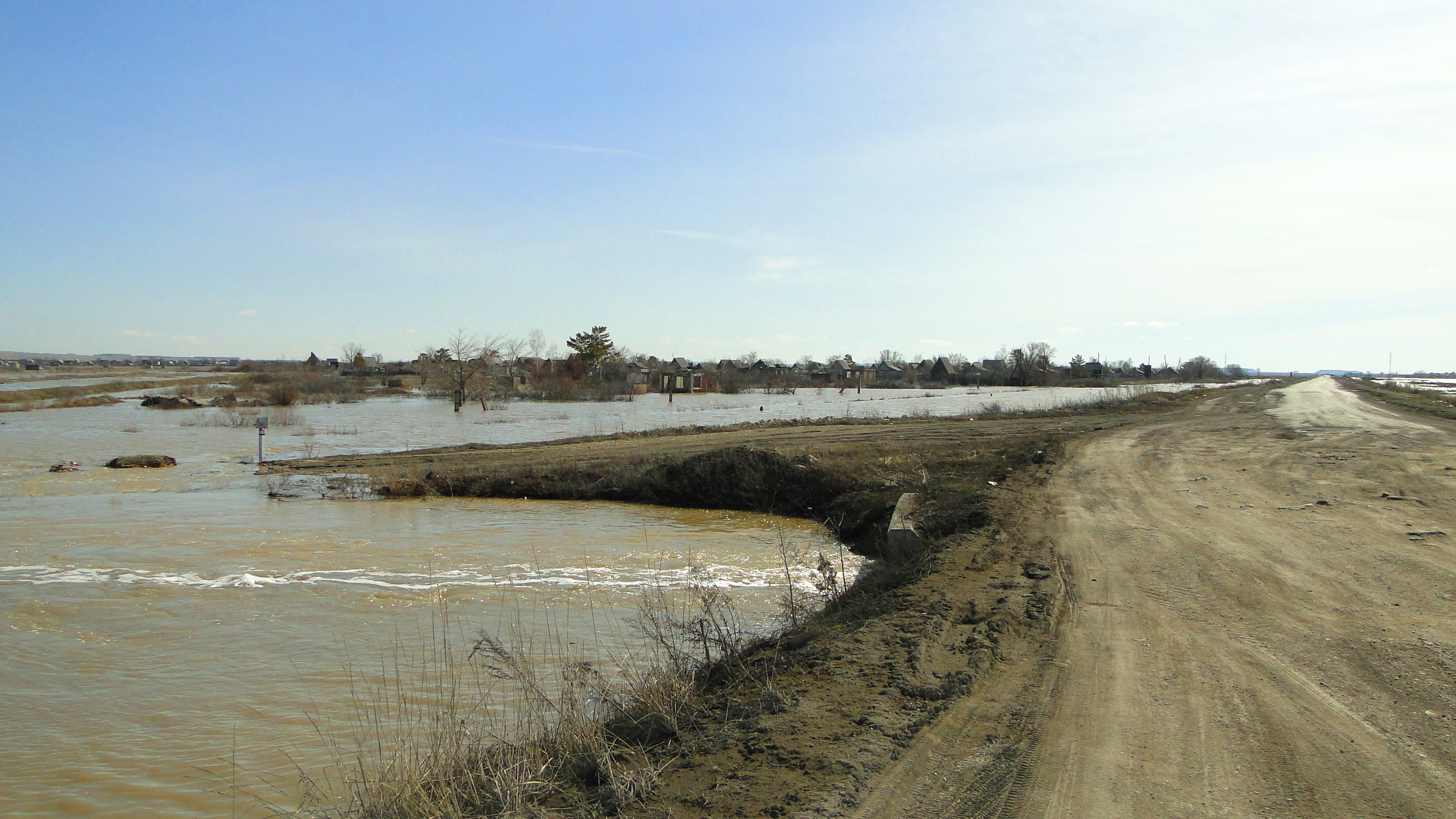
- View of the riverbank

- Mouth location in Kazakhstan

Location
- Countries: Kazakhstan

Physical characteristics
- Source: Kumiskudyk; Kazakh Uplands
  - coordinates: 49°47′05″N 73°33′51″E
- Mouth: Sherubainura
  - coordinates: 49°52′54″N 72°34′04″E
- Length: 102 km (63 mi)
- Basin size: 3,220 km^{2} (1,240 sq mi)
- Discharge
  - average: 0.70 cubic metres per second (25 cu ft/s) at Karyli

Basin features
- Progression: Sherubainura → Nura → Tengiz

The Sokyr (Kazakh: Соқыр) is a river in the Karaganda Region, Kazakhstan. It is 102 kilometres (63 mi) long and has a catchment area of 3,220 square kilometres (1,240 sq mi).

The river is one of the main tributaries of the Sherubainura, Nura basin. It flows across Bukhar-Zhyrau District in the Karaganda coal basin area. Its water is not suitable for drinking, but it serves the purpose of watering local livestock.

== Course ==
The Sokyr has its sources in an artesian aquifer near Kumiskudyk, 6 km (3.7 mi) to the east of Karakudyk (Қарақұдық) village. It heads initially southwestwards with low hills rising above its right bank and a plain on the left bank. Midway through its course it bends roughly to the WNW, flows past the southern outskirts of Karaganda city and bends to the northwest. Its main tributaries are the Bukpa, Ashchylayrik and Karagandinka. Finally, the Sokyr reaches the Sherubainura and enters it from the right bank near Karazhar (Қаражар). The last stretch of the river often stops flowing, splitting into disconnected pools before it dries up.

The Sokyr freezes between early November and April. The valley is between 2 km (1.2 mi) and 5 km (3.1 mi) wide in its upper stretch, widening further to almost 8 km (5.0 mi) near its mouth. The river channel has a width of 30 m (98 ft) to 40 m (130 ft) in the upper course and 50 m (160 ft) to 60 m (200 ft) in the lower reaches. The 4 km (2.5 mi) long and 2 km (1.2 mi) wide Fedorov Reservoir, built in 1941 by filling with river water a coal mine pit, is located in the lower course of the Sokyr. The river is fed by rainfall and snow.

== Fauna ==
The main fish species in the Sokyr include crucian carp, pike, perch, roach and karabalik.

== See also ==
- List of rivers of Kazakhstan
