= Karaganda Regional Kazakh Drama Theatre named after Säken Seifullin =

- Сәкен Сейфуллин атындағы Қарағанды облыстық қазақ драма театры
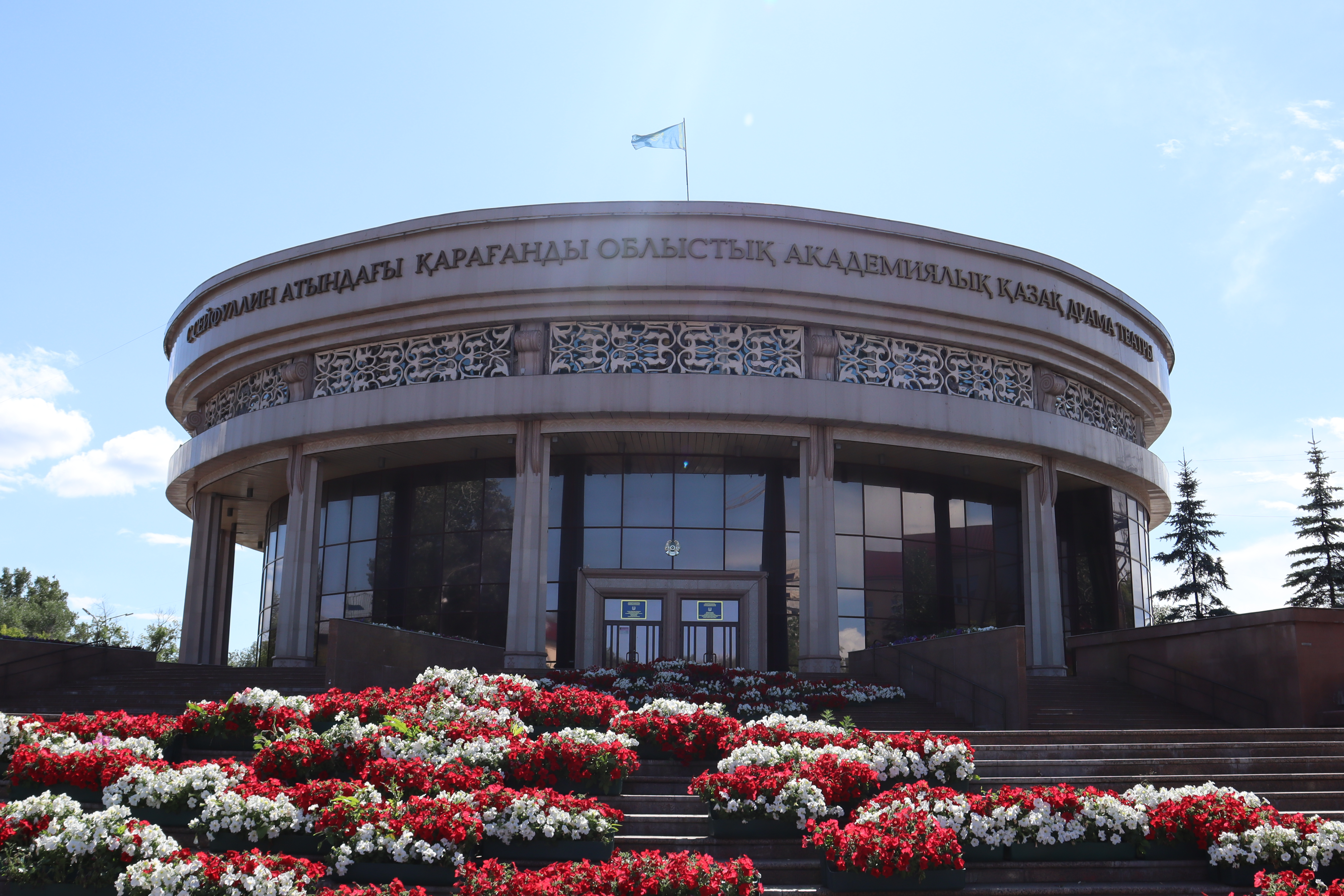
- The building of the theatre.

General information
- Address: Byqar Jyrau Ave. 25
- Town or city: Karaganda
- Country: Kazakhstan
- Coordinates: 49°48′41″N 73°4′48″E

The Karaganda Regional Kazakh Drama Theater named after Säken Seifullin (Kazakh: Сәкен Сейфуллин атындағы Қарағанды облыстық қазақ драма театры, romanized: Säken Seifullin atyndağy Qarağandy oblystyq qazaq drama teatry) is a theater in the city of Karaganda, one of the oldest Kazakh drama theaters.

== History ==
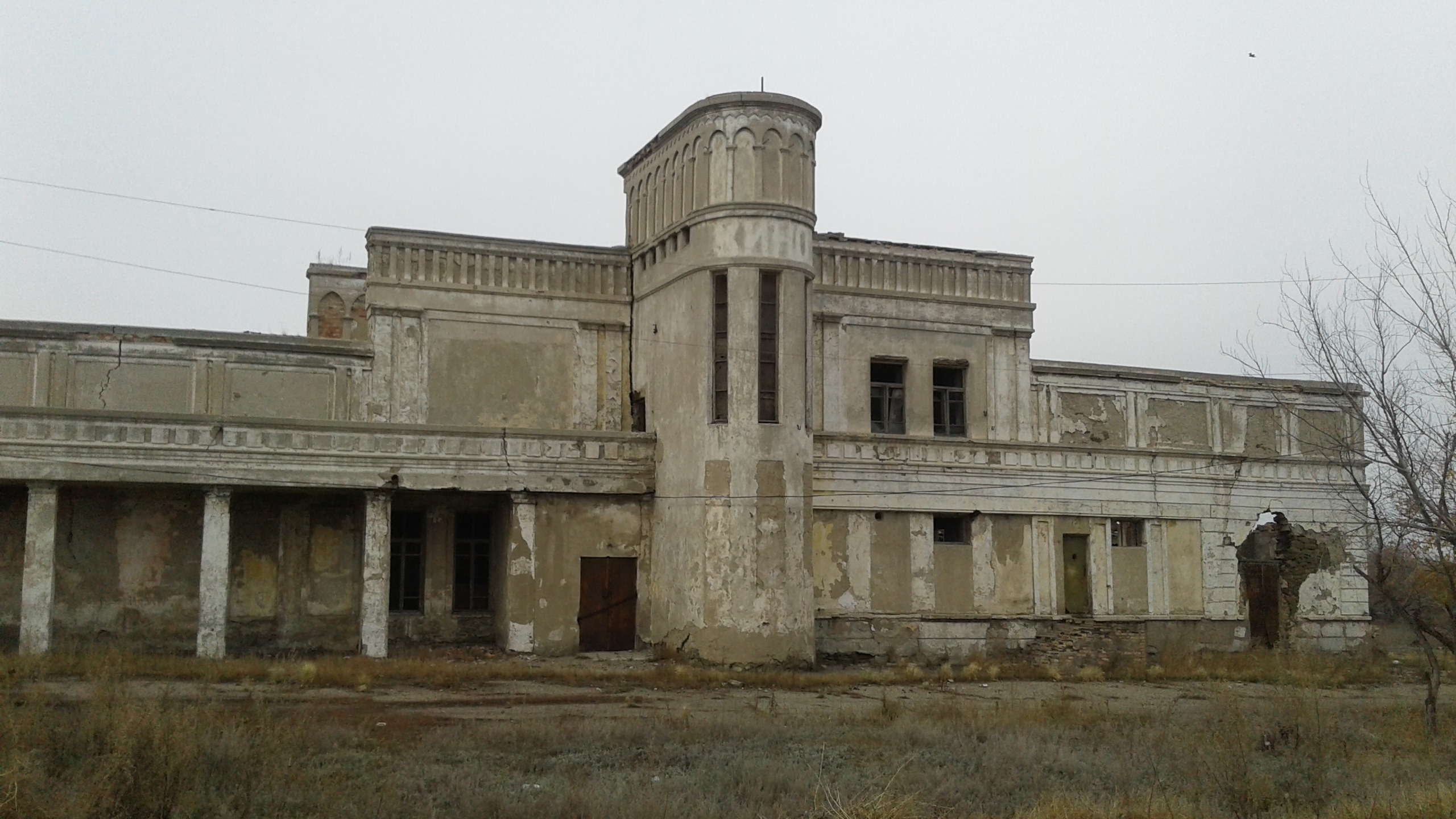
The old theater building in the Old Town of Karaganda.

The history of the Kazakh Drama Theatre dates back to 1932, and in the first years of its existence the theatre was located in the area now called the "Old Town". It was founded in 1932 on the basis of an amateur circle as a theatre of working youth (TRAM, 1932–1934, among the founders was People's Artist of the Kazakh SSR Seifolla Telgarayev), then – the city theatre of working youth (1934–1936) and since 1936 the regional drama theatre, since 1939 – the musical and drama theatre. In 1951–1964 – the united Kazakh and Russian drama theatre. In 1964 the theatre was named after the outstanding figure of Kazakh literature Säken Seifullin.

=== Management ===
From 2020:

Director - Q. Qalymov

From 2021

Artistic director: A. Salban.

== Performances ==
The theater staged plays by M. Auezov, G. Musirepov, S. Mukanov and other Kazakh playwrights.

The theatre opened in 1932 with the play "Zaure" by K. Baiseitov and A. T. Shapip. The theatre staged plays by Kazakh authors ("Orders of Taltanbai" and "Front" by B. Mailin, "Enlik-Kebek" and "Night Robbers" by M. Auezov), works of classical drama ("Servant of Two Masters" by K. Goldoni, "Marriage" by N. V. Gogol), heroic and patriotic ("In the Hour of Trials" and "Guard of Honor" by M. Auezov, "Russian People" by M. Sholokhov), historical-biographical and historical-folklore themes ("Akai Seri - Acts" by G. Musrepov, "Chokan Valikhanov" by S. Mukaiov, "Aldar Kose" by Sh. Khusainov), etc.

The play "Lonely Apple Tree" (directed by A. Orazbekov) received 2nd prize at the International Festival of Folk Theatres. The productions "Zamana netken tar edsh" by K. Zhumabekov (1995), "Bir tup alma agashy" by A. Orazbekov (1996), "Zhan pida" by Ch. Aitmatov (1998), "Forget Herostratus..." by G. Gorin (1999), "Domalaq ana" by Sh. Murtaza (2001) received prizes at theatre festivals of the republican and international level. At the International Festival of Experimental Theatres (Cairo, 2000), the play "Road to Kyoto" by M. Gapparov and G. Gapparova won a special prize from the Ministry of Culture of Egypt.

== Building of the theatre ==
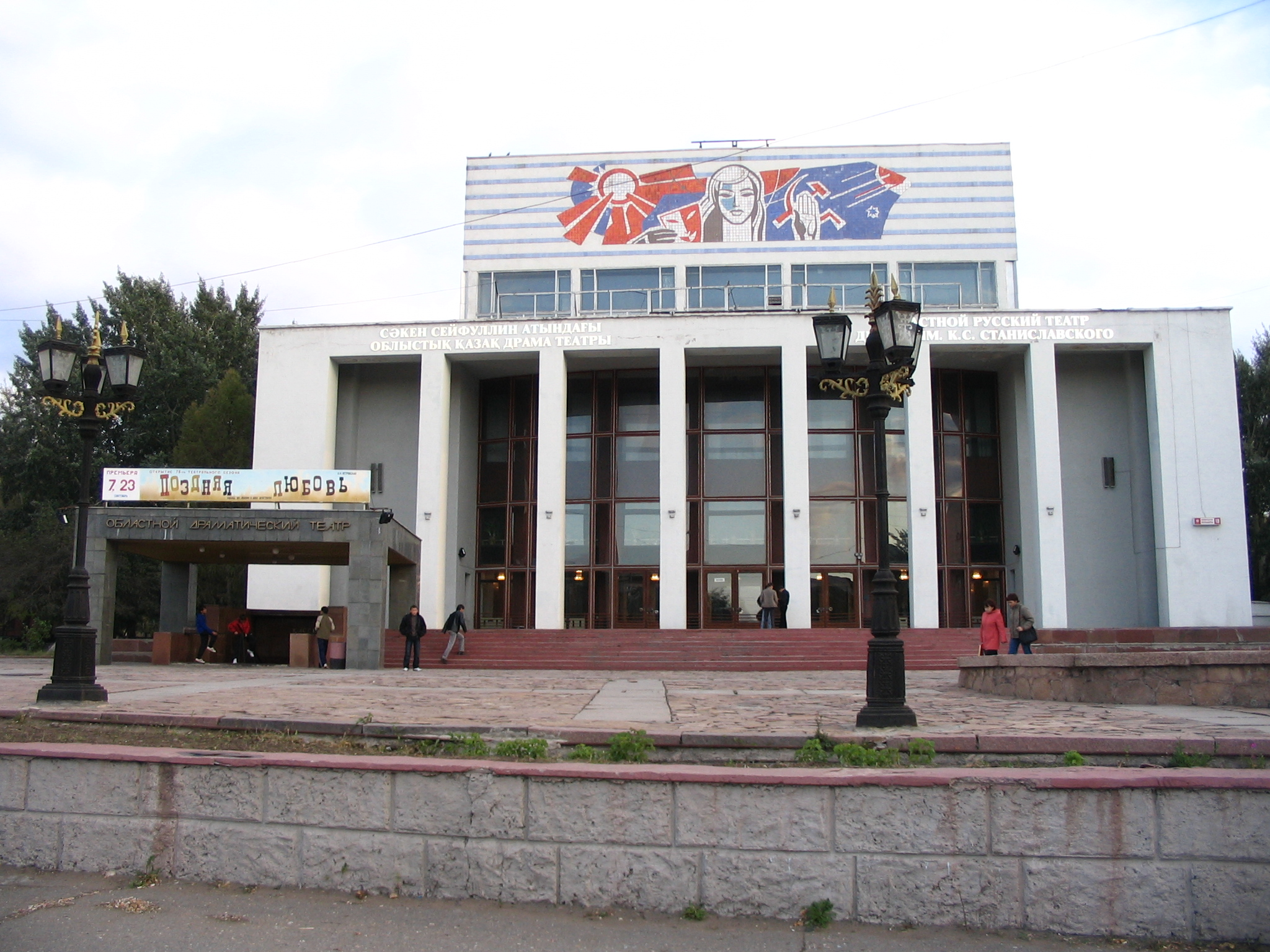
Former theater building

For many years, the Drama Theatre was the main centre of cultural life, and after the city was moved to a new location, the Kazakh Drama Theatre also moved to the new building. The old building of the theatre was not destroyed, but due to the lack of proper maintenance, it fell into disrepair and is currently on the verge of collapse. However, despite the serious damage, the old building of the Kazakh Drama Theatre is one of the most important historical monuments of the Karaganda Region. It is not only the oldest stone building in Karaganda, but also a very rare example of constructivist architecture for Kazakhstan. It is located in the area of the Parkhomenko Plant. Since its inception, the theatre did not have its own building and was based in the building of the Karaganda Regional Russian Drama Theatre named after K.S. Stanislavsky. In December 2008, a new building was opened on Bukhar-Zhyrau Avenue. The new theatre was built on the site of the old Summer Theatre at the intersection of Bukhar-Zhyrau Avenue and Mira Boulevard.

== Awards ==
In 1982, the theater was awarded the Order of Friendship of Peoples. At the IV Republican Festival in 1996, the Karaganda Kazakh Drama Theater took second place. At the VII Republican Festival, the Karaganda Kazakh Drama Theater won the ''Grand Prix'' for the play based on G. Gorin's play "Atyn shykpasa". Currently, the theater employs 8 leading stage masters and 12 top-category actors.
