= Qosshy =

City in Kazakhstan

Qosshy Qosşy / Қосшы
- City
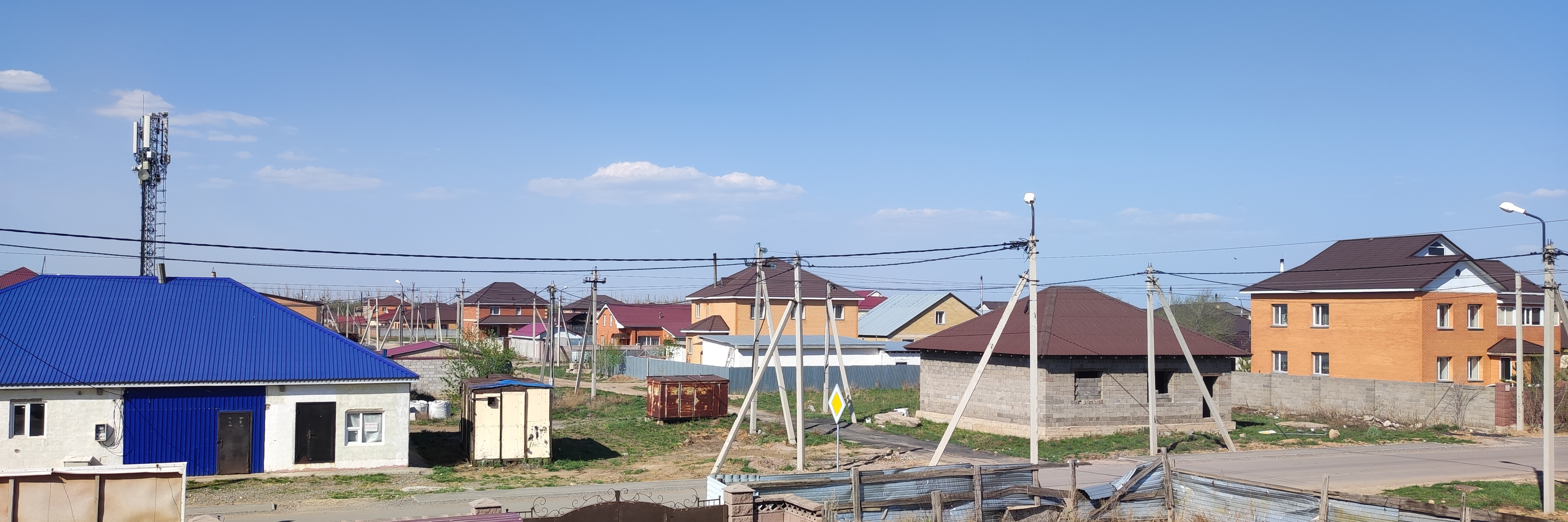
- View of the city

- Location in Kazakhstan
- Coordinates: 50°58′32″N 71°20′58″E
- Country: Kazakhstan
- Region: Akmola
- Established: 27 July 2021

Government
  - Äkim: Azamat Qapyşev

Area
  - Total: 52 km^{2} (20 sq mi)
- Elevation: 360 m (1,180 ft)

Population
  - Total: 58,198
  - Density: 1,100/km^{2} (2,900/sq mi)
- Time zone: UTC+05:00 (Kazakhstan Time)
- Website: Official website

Qosshy (Kazakh: Қосшы, romanized: Qosşy) is a city of regional significance and a rapidly growing southern suburb of Astana, the capital of Kazakhstan. It is located in Akmola Region and had an estimated population of 58,198 in 2024.

== Geography ==
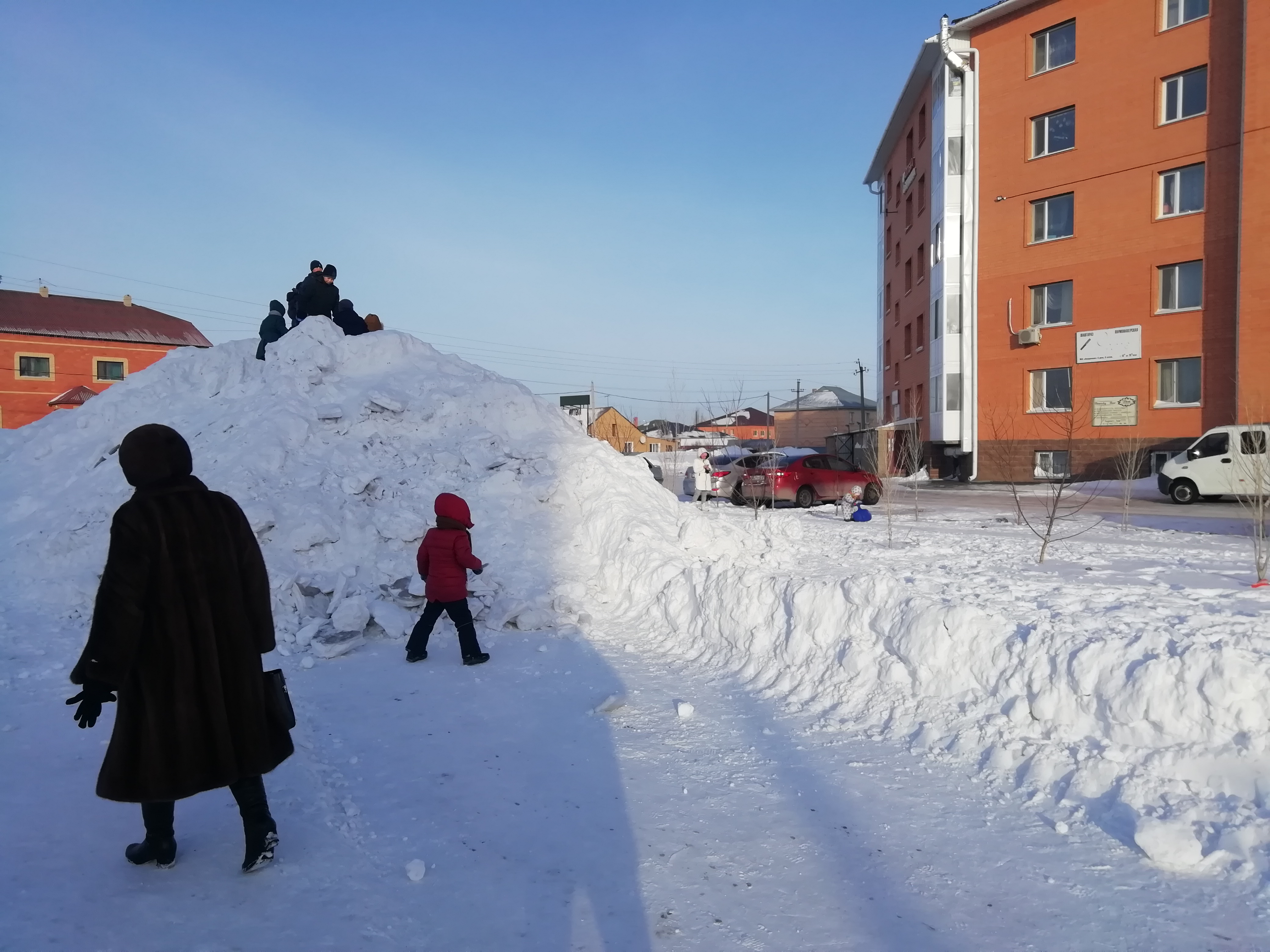
Winter in Qosshy

Qosshy is located on the Kazakh Uplands of central Kazakhstan. It borders the city of Astana to the north, and is surrounded by Tselinograd District on its other sides. The city covers an area of 52 square kilometres (20 sq mi) and includes the village of Taytöbe located 2 kilometres (1.2 mi) west of Qosshy's city centre, which has its own village administration. Outside of the settlements of Qosshy and Taytöbe, the lands controlled by the city administration are mainly agricultural lands used for grazing.

Qosshy is located in the interfluve between the Nura and Esil rivers; the first of these forms Qosshy's southern border with Tselinograd District. The main waterways in the city are the temporary Sarkyrama channel, which discharges overflow spring runoff from the Nura into the Esil; and the Nura–Esil canal, which forms Qosshy's eastern border with Tselinograd District.

Qosshy has a cold semi-arid climate, with long winters (November–March) and short summers (June–August). The warmest month is July, with an average temperature of 20.7 °C (69.3 °F), while the coldest month is January, with an average temperature of −15.1 °C (4.8 °F). The average frost-free period is 132 days. Qosshy receives an average of 2532 hours of sunlight in a year. The average annual rainfall is 342 millimetres (13.5 in). Relative humidity ranges from 53 to 68% in summer to 77–80% in winter.

== History ==
The territory where Qosshy is located was most recently settled in the 1890s under the colonization policies of the Russian Empire, although it has been inhabited for a much longer period. In Taytöbe a kurgan from the Tasmola culture was partially excavated in 2002, and the place name of Taytöbe is also recorded in a folk legend collected by Grigory Potanin involving Qobylandy Toqtarbaiūly.

The village of Qosshy was founded on 23 April 1926, when seven families in the area joined the Koshchi peasant union and adapted its name as the name of their settlement.

After Astana was made the capital of Kazakhstan, Qosshy began to receive an influx of migrants seeking lower property prices near the new capital. The village's infrastructure was insufficient to handle the large increase in population, including a lack of paved roads, electricity, water outages, gas, garbage collection, schools, hospitals, and amenities. Qosshy's residents demanded that the village be annexed by Astana, but this was not done. Instead, on 27 July 2021, the rural district of Qosshy, including the villages of Qosshy and Taytöbe, was made a city of regional significance and separated from Tselinograd District.

== Demographics ==
As Astana's population has grown in recent years, Qosshy has also experienced a population boom, becoming a commuter town for the capital. Qosshy recorded a population of 4527 people in the 2009 census. By 2023 the recorded population had reached 51,664, and it is projected to reach 150,000 by 2038.

== Economy and infrastructure ==
The majority of Qosshy's labour force commutes to Astana for work. As Qosshy continues to grow rapidly, construction and related manufacturing activities form the backbone of the local economy. CTS (City transportation System) is planning to build the new Astana Light Metro Line connecting city to Astana. Local sand and gravel deposits are also mined for use in the construction industry.

Qosshy is located on the P3 highway between Astana and Temirtau. Astana's Nursultan Nazarbayev International Airport is located adjacent to the northeast corner of Qosshy's city limits.
