= Karaganda =

City in Karagandy Region, Kazakhstan

Karaganda Қарағанды Qarağandy
- City
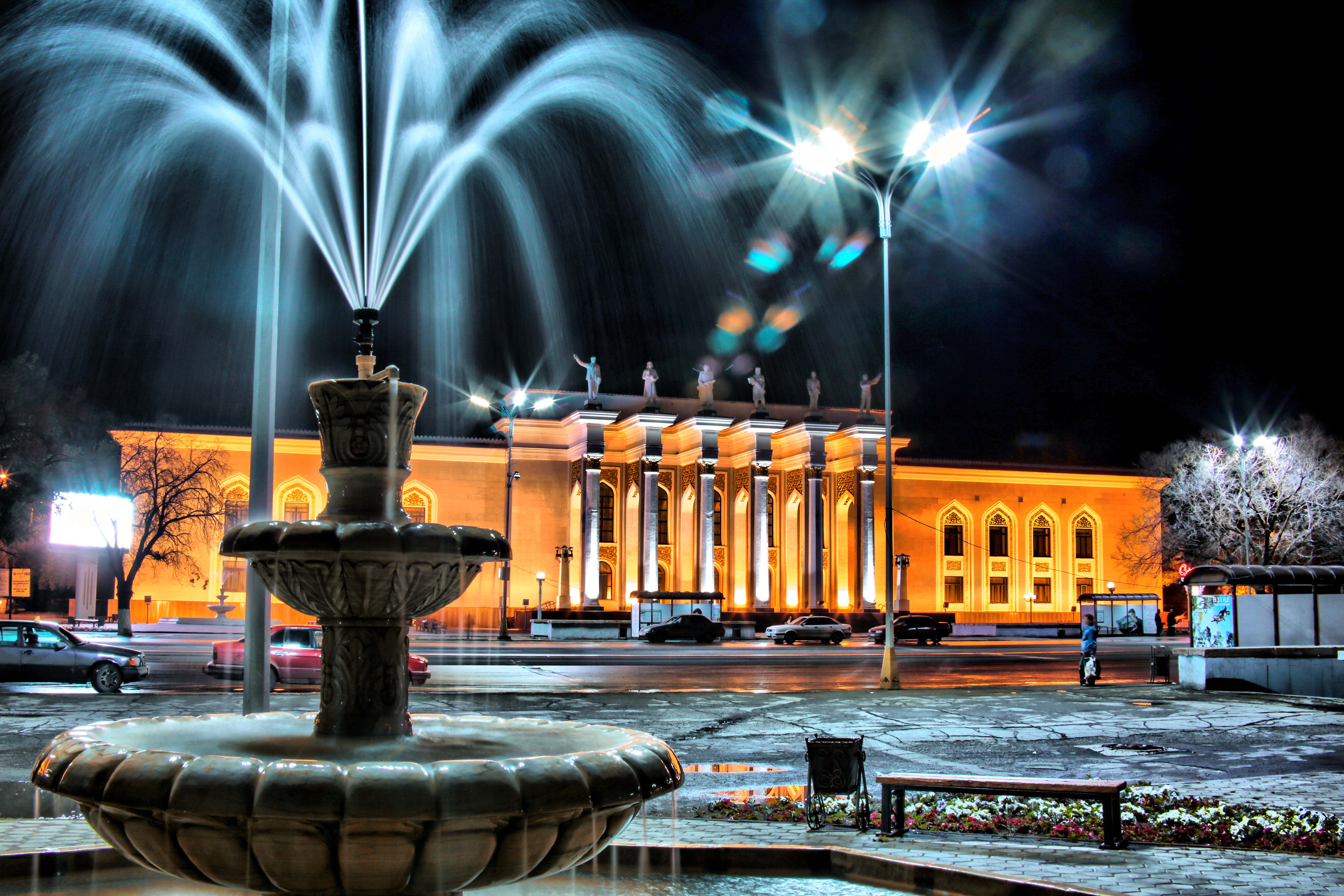
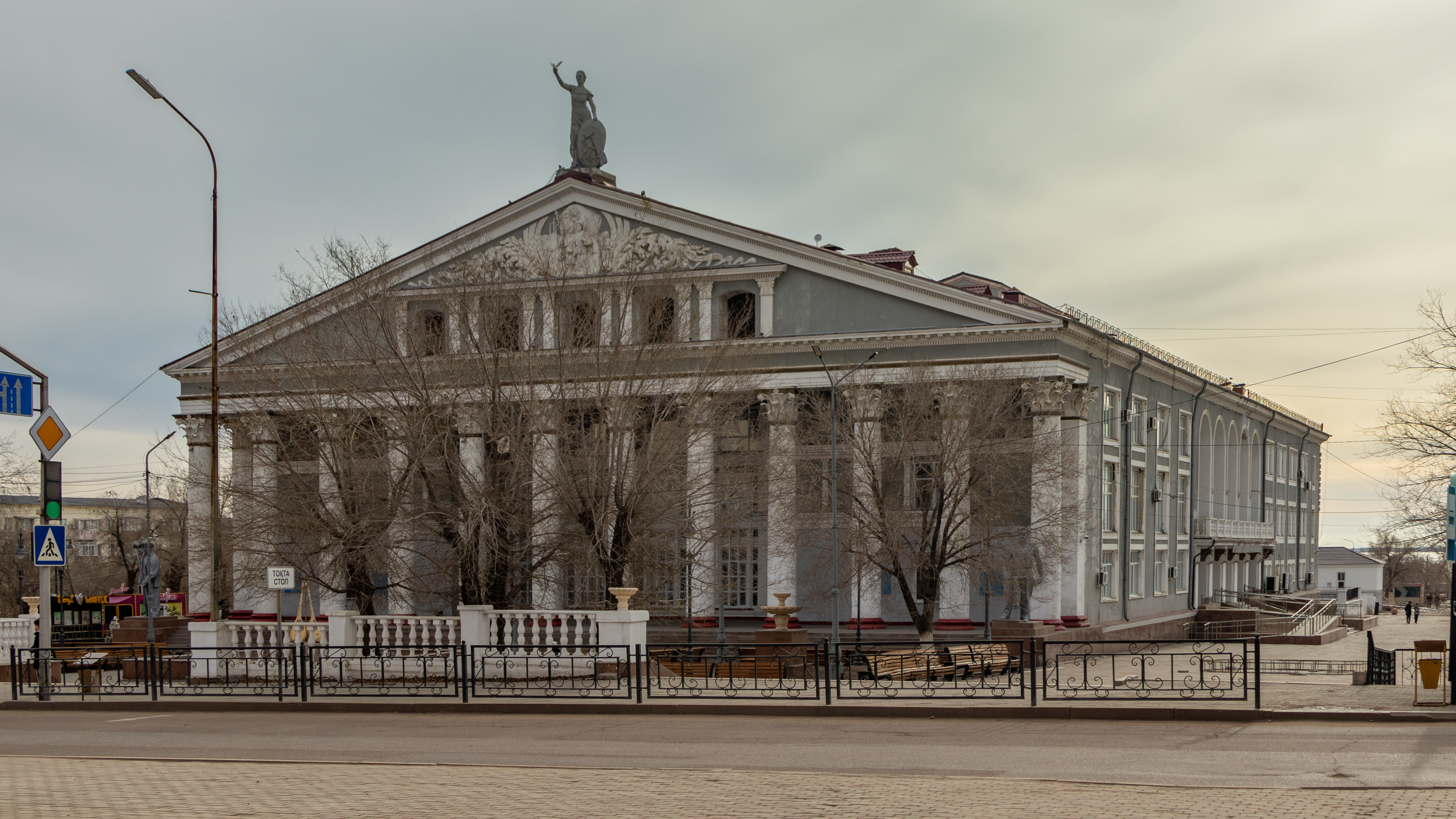
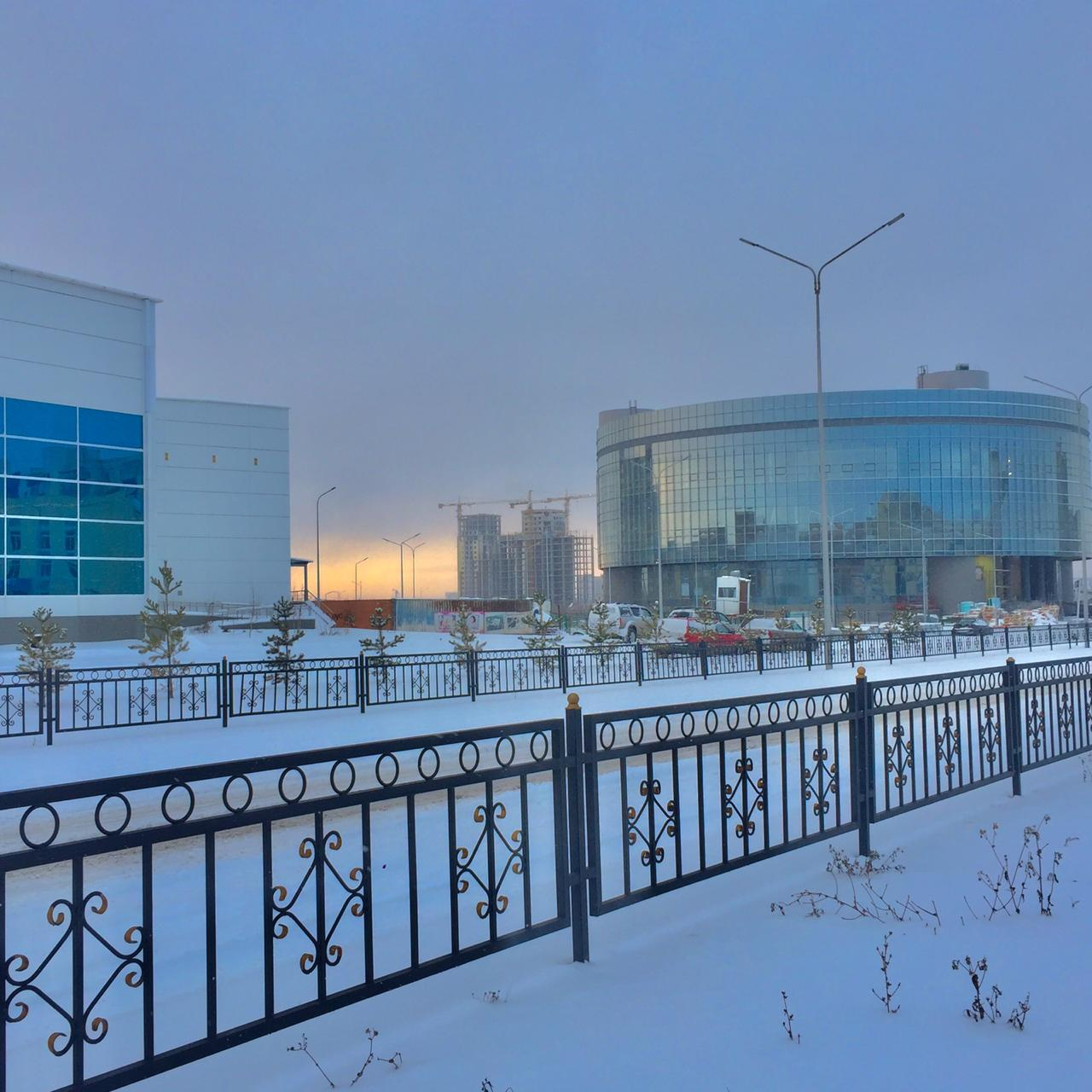
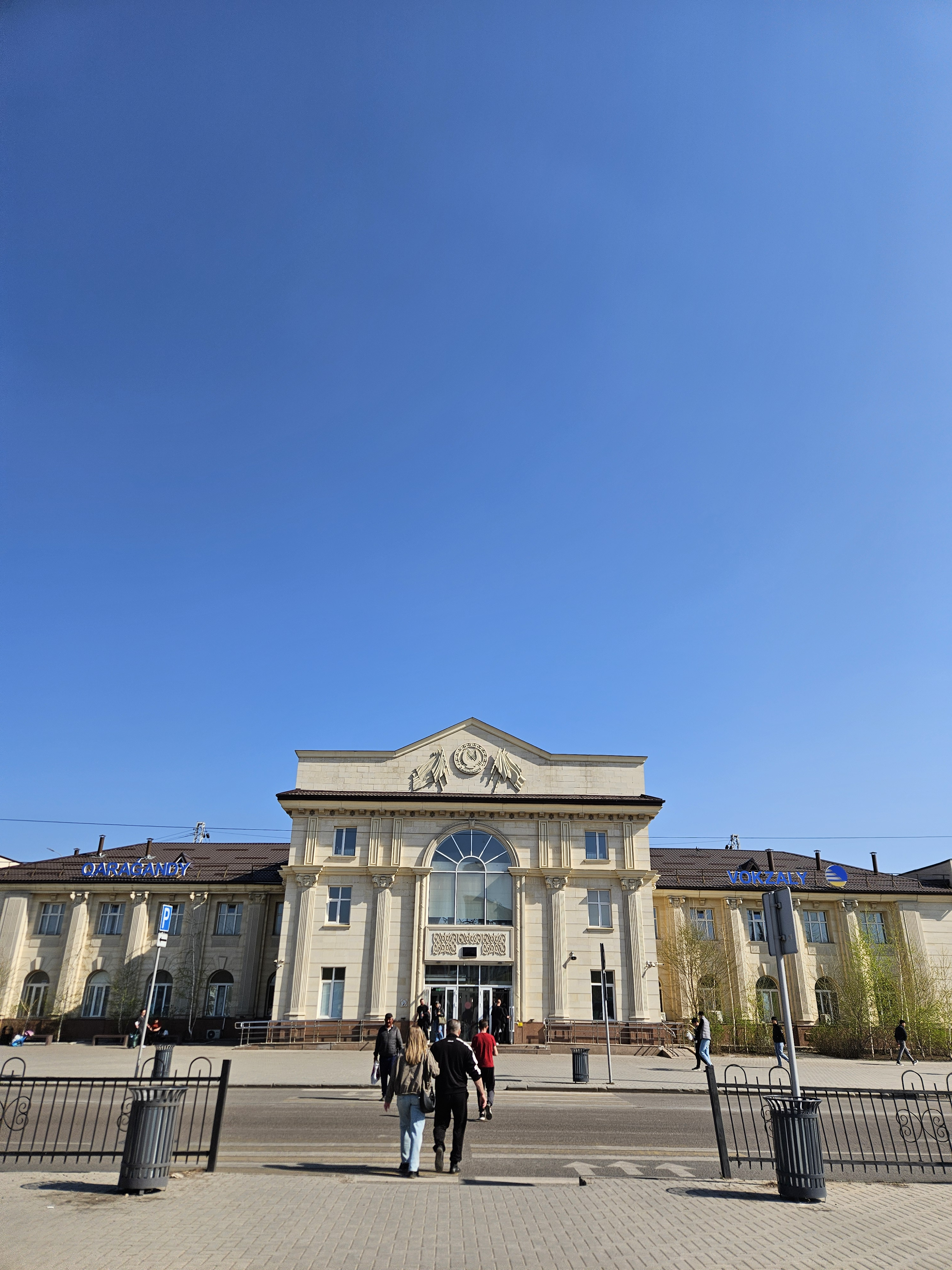
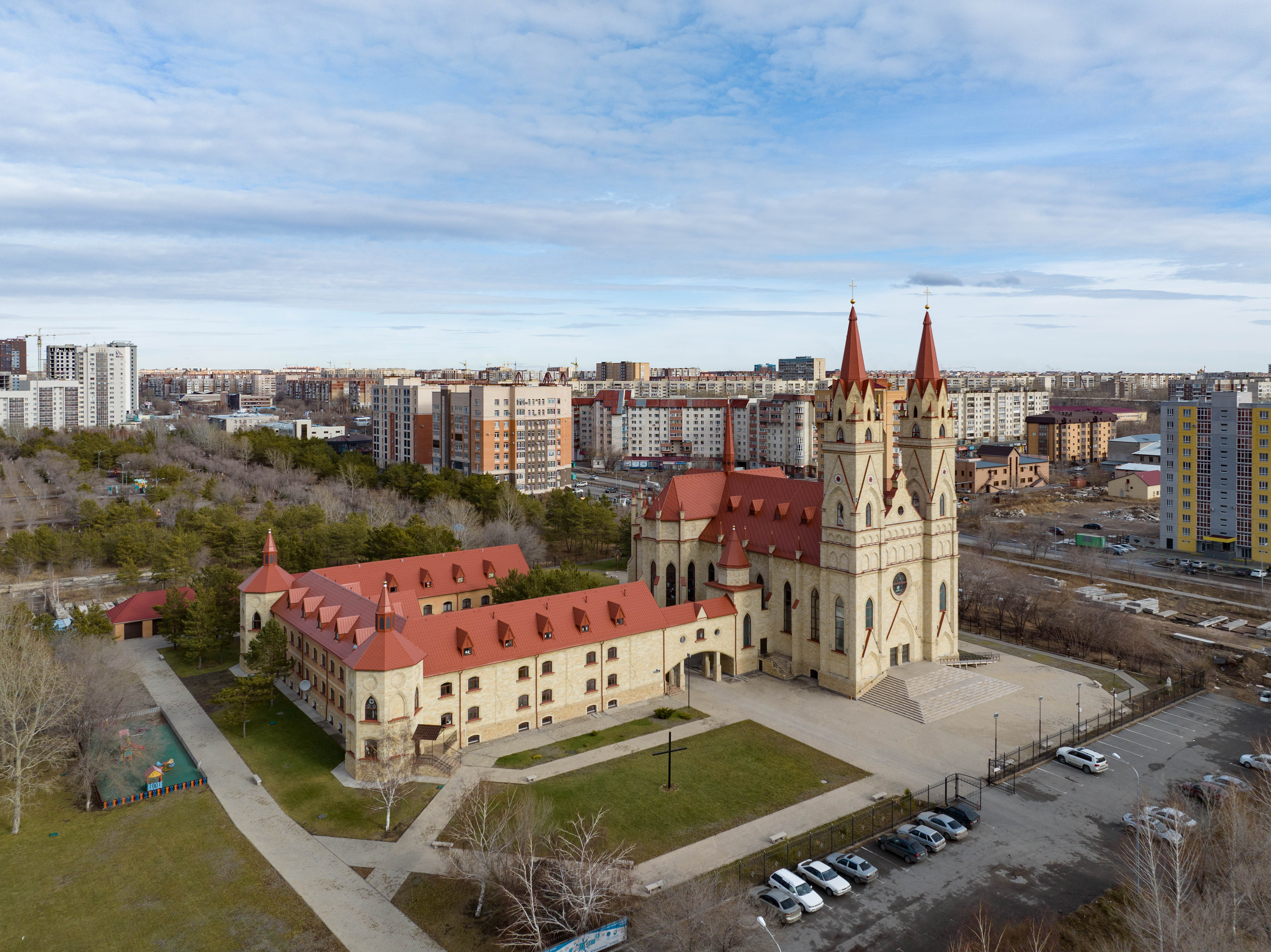
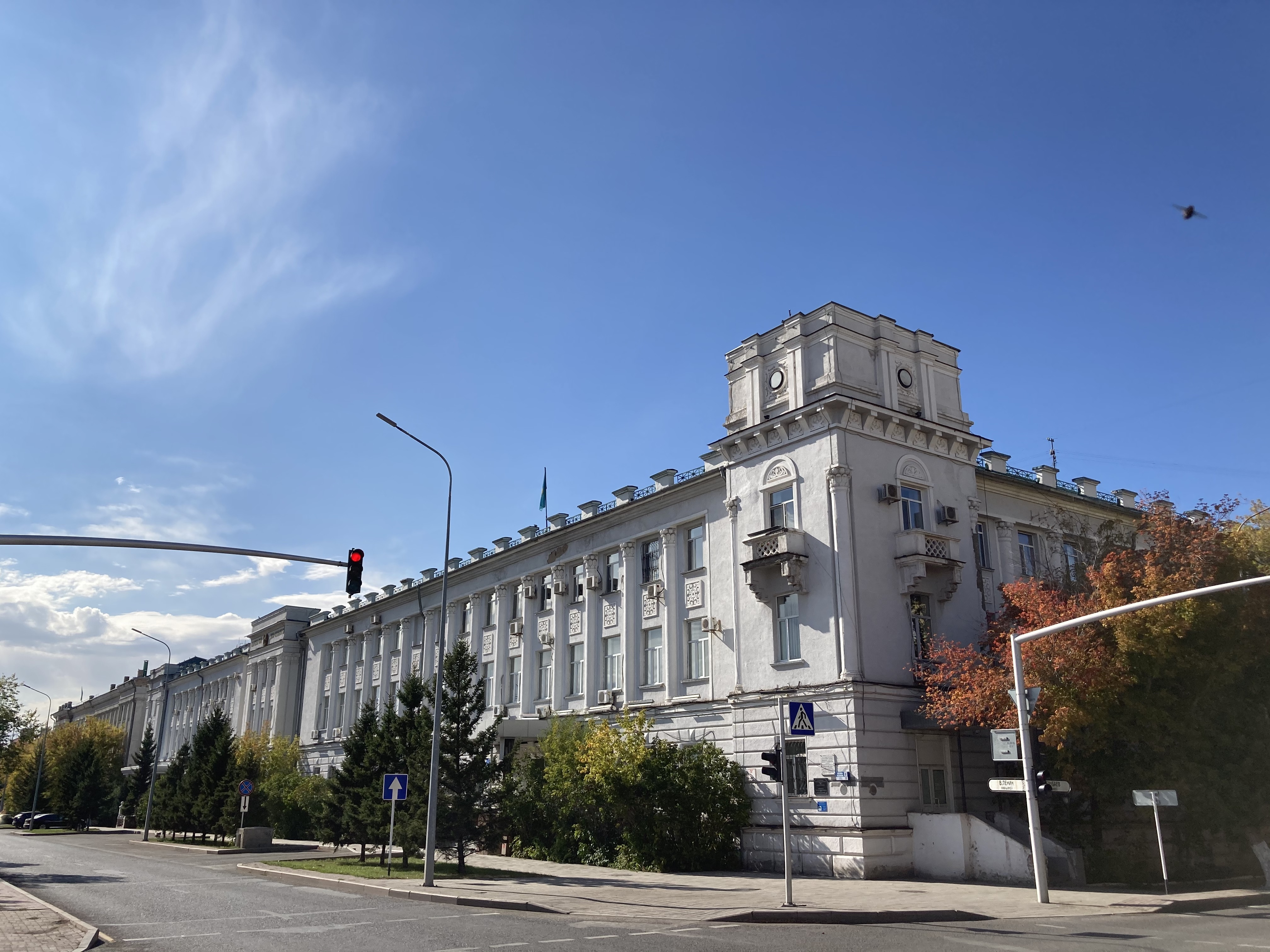

- Seal

- Location in Kazakhstan
- Coordinates: 49°48′10″N 73°06′20″E
- Country: Kazakhstan
- Region: Qaraghandy Region
- Founded: 1931

Government
  - Akim (mayor): Meiram Kozhukhov

Area
  - Total: 497.8 km^{2} (192.2 sq mi)
- Elevation: 546 m (1,791 ft)

Population (2020)
  - Total: 497,777
  - Rank: 5th in Kazakhstan
  - Density: 1,000/km^{2} (2,590/sq mi)
- Time zone: UTC+5 (Time in Kazakhstan)
- Postal code: 100000 - 100030
- Area code: +7 7212
- Vehicle registration: M and 09 (region)
- Climate: Dfb
- Website: karaganda-akimat.gov.kz

Karaganda (Note: UK: /ˌkærəˈɡændə/ KARR-ə-GAND-ə, US: /ˌkɑːrəˈɡɑːndə/ KAHR-ə-GAHND-ə; Russian: Караганда [kɐˌraɡɐnˈda]) or Karagandy (Note: UK: /ˌkærəˈɡændi/ KARR-ə-GAND-ee, US: /ˌkɑːrəˈɡɑːndi/ KAHR-ə-GAHND-ee; Russian: Караганды [kɐˌraɡɐnˈdɨ]; Kazakh: Қарағанды, romanized: Qarağandy, pronounced [qʰɑrɑ́ʁɑnd̥ə́]) is a major city in central Kazakhstan and the capital of the Karaganda Region. It is the fifth-most populous city in the country, with a population of 497,777 as of the 2020 Census, marking an increase from 459,778 in 2009 and 436,864 in 1999. Karaganda is located approximately 230 kilometers (140 miles) southeast of Kazakhstan's capital city, Astana.

Historically, Karaganda has been a central hub for coal mining, which has shaped its economy and development. The city saw significant growth during the Soviet Union, driven by the expansion of its coal industry. Coal remains a key sector in the city's economy, with mining continuing to be a significant contributor to its industrial base.

In addition to its industrial roots, Karaganda is home to a growing population and a rich cultural heritage. The city hosts several educational institutions, such as Karaganda State University, which support its role as an academic and research center in central Kazakhstan. Karaganda's infrastructure and economy have been evolving, with modernization efforts in various sectors, including transportation, healthcare, and housing.

Karaganda is also known for its historical significance, having played an important role in the industrial development of the Soviet Union. Today, it stands as a key city in Kazakhstan, contributing to the country's economy while maintaining its historical and cultural heritage.

== Etymology ==
The name Karaganda is derived from "caragana" bushes (Caragana arborescens, Caragana frutex), which are abundant in the area.

== History ==
=== Old Town ===
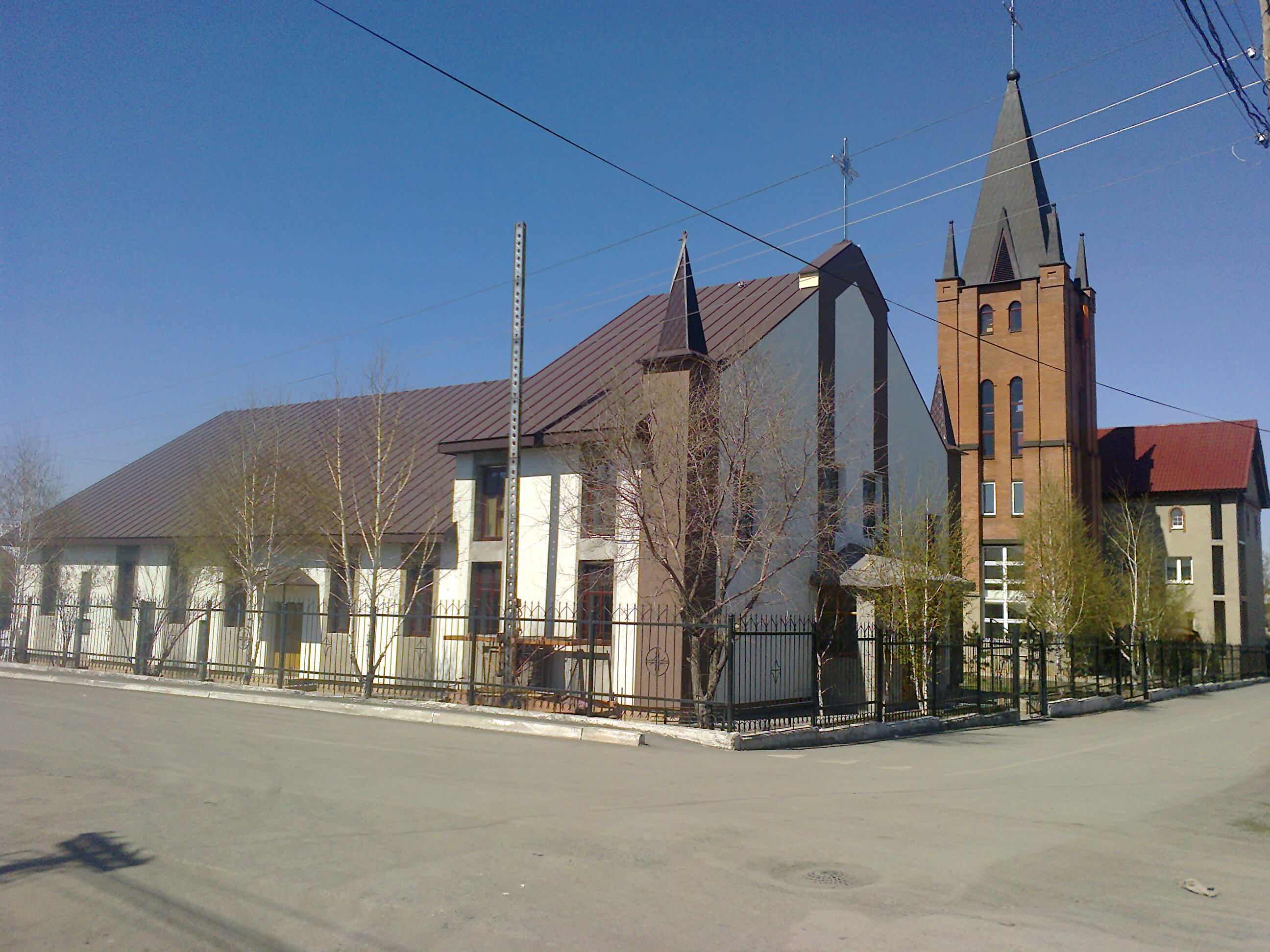
Saint Joseph Cathedral

Modern-day Karaganda dates back to 1833, when local shepherd Appak Baizhanov allegedly found coal on the site of the city, prompting a coal mining boom. By the late 19th century, the local mines had attracted workers from nearby villages, Russian merchants, and entrepreneurs from France and England. After this initial boom, the mines were abandoned; they are often still labeled on city maps as the "Old Town", but almost nothing remains on that site.

=== 20th century ===
In the late 1920s, Soviet geologists examined the region's coal deposits, prompting Soviet authorities to establish the Karaganda Coal Trust, and plan for the creation of coal mines and a mining town in the area. Planners set out to create a dozen coal mines, and drafted blueprints for a city to house an estimated 40,000 workers. Coal mining in the area resumed in 1930, and temporary structures were built for miners and their families. The new area for the city was to the south of the initial mines. Initially, Karaganda suffered from an inadequate amount of supplies, and living conditions in the settlement were often poor. In 1930, coal production was below expectations. In February 1931, the area was connected via railroad, bringing in a wealth of supplies and highly-qualified personnel. Later that year, NKVD officials established the Karlag Prison. Upon the establishment of the Karlag Prison, authorities began to import labor into the region en masse. During the 1930s, the area experienced rapid growth. In 1931, Karaganda was incorporated as a village, and in 1934, was declared a city. Led by planner Alexander Ivanovich Kuznetsov, masters plans for Karaganda were laid out from 1934 until 1938. During the Stalinist purges, peoples from many nationalities, including Germans, Karachais, Kalmyks, Chechens, Ingush, Greeks, and Crimean Tatars were sent to Karlag. By 1939, Karaganda had a population of about 100,000, about half of which were prisoners.

In the 1940s, up to 70% of the city's inhabitants were ethnic Germans. Most of the ethnic Germans were Soviet Volga Germans who were collectively deported to Siberia and Kazakhstan on Stalin's order when Hitler invaded Soviet-annexed eastern Poland and the Soviet Union proper in 1941. Until the 1950s, many of these deportees were interned in labor camps, often simply because they were of German descent. The population of Karaganda fell by 14% from 1989 to 1999 following the dissolution of the Soviet Union; it was once Kazakhstan's second-largest city after Almaty. Over 100,000 people have since emigrated to Germany. There is also a concentration of ethnic Poles in the city.

Robert F. Kennedy (later US Attorney General and US Senator), alongside US Supreme Court Justice William O. Douglas, visited "five Soviet Central Asian Republics": Turkmenistan, Uzbekistan, Tadzhikistan, Kirghizia, and Kazakhstan. While on the six week trip (e.g., Bukhara, 300 to 1 mosque after Soviet rule), his biographers reported that their delegation was not allowed to visit the city of Karaganda which was one of the sites of the most notorious labor camps within the confines of the Soviet Union. The delegation was diverted to Siberia after four denials of visas.

==== 1962 electromagnetic pulse incident ====
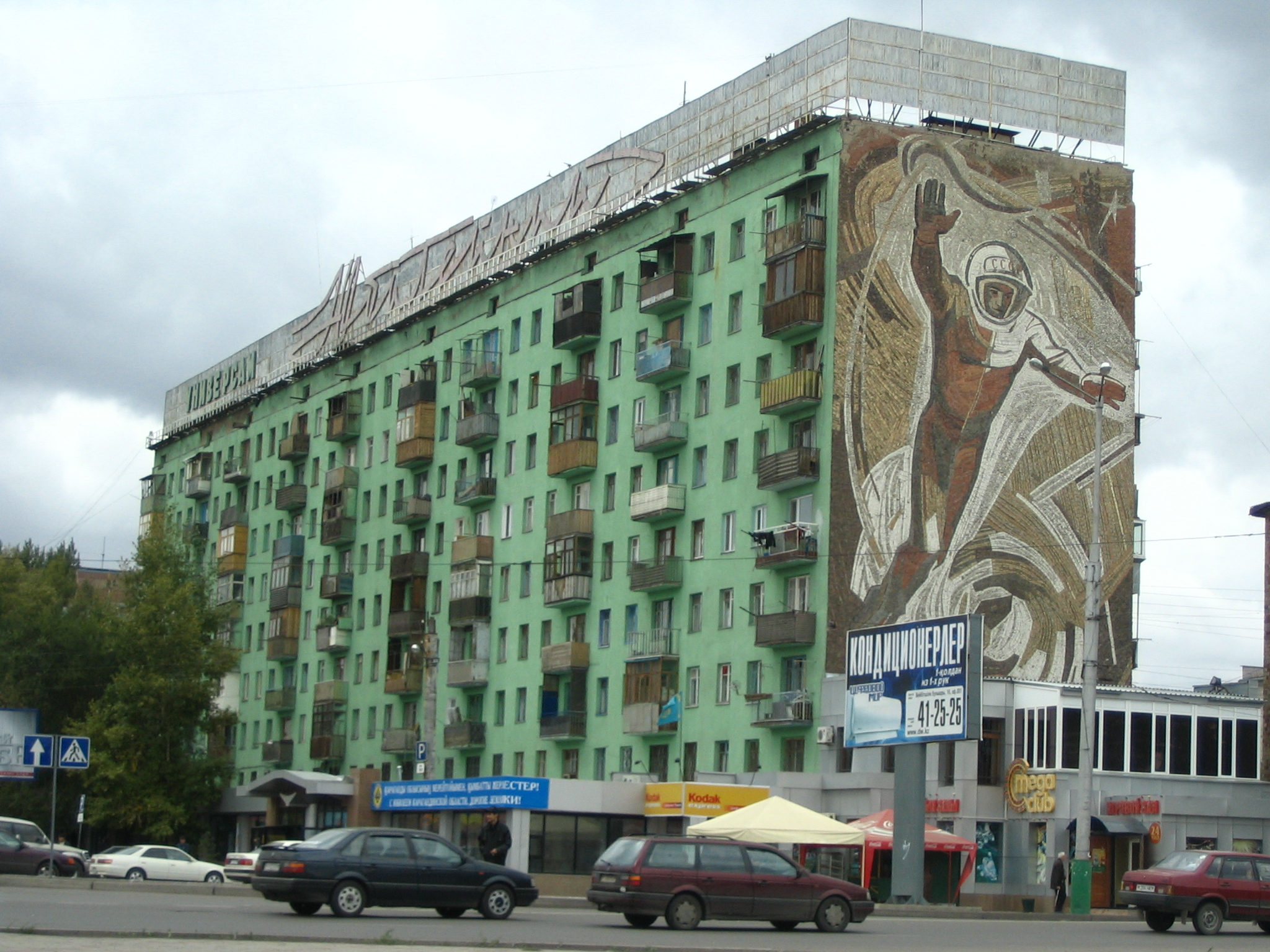
Nurken Abdirov Street at the corner of Gogol Street.

Karaganda suffered the most severe electromagnetic pulse effects ever observed when its electrical power plant was set on fire by currents induced in a 1,000 km (620 mi) long shallow buried power cable by Soviet Test ‘184’ on 22 October 1962. The test was part of the Soviet Project K nuclear tests (ABM System A proof tests), and consisted of a 300-kiloton high-altitude nuclear explosion at an altitude of 290 km (180 mi) over Zhezkazgan.

Prompt gamma ray-produced EMP induced a current of 2,500 amps measured by spark gaps in a 570 km (350 mi) stretch of overhead telephone line to Zharyq, blowing all the protective fuses. The late-time MHD-EMP was of low enough frequency to enable it to penetrate 90 cm (35 in) into the ground, overloading a shallow buried lead and steel tape-protected 1,000 km (620 mi) long power cable between Aqmola (now called Astana) and Almaty. It fired circuit breakers and set the Karaganda power plant on fire.

==== Late 20th century ====
Kuznetsov's master plan for the city was intended to accommodate 300,000 inhabitants, which was surpassed by the late 1960s. This prompted planners to devise a new plan with the goal of accommodating 600,000 people. By the 1980s, the city's population surpassed 600,000, creating the need for further expansion. In 1983, the Karaganda Circus was constructed, which was criticized for its high cost.

In the early 1990s, Karaganda was briefly considered as a candidate for the capital of the (then) newly independent Republic of Kazakhstan, but its bid was turned down in favour of Astana.

=== 21st century ===
==== 2019 archaeological findings ====
In July 2019, remains of a young couple buried face to face dated 4,000 years back were unearthed in Karaganda Region by a group of archaeologists led by Igor Kukushkin from Saryarka Archaeological Institute in Karaganda. It is assumed that the Bronze Age couple were 16 or 17 years old when they died. From the buried gold and jewelry artifacts, ceramic pots, woman's two bracelets on each arm beads, remains of horses and knives found in the grave, Kukushkin supposes that they were from a noble family.

==== 2023 Kostenko mine fire ====
On 28 October 2023 the Kostenko mine, a coal mine in Karaganda run by ArcelorMittal Temirtau, the local unit of ArcelorMittal, caught fire, killing at least 32 people. In weeks prior to the fire, the Kazakhstani government announced it was in talks to take over part of ArcelorMittal Temirtau's operations, in part due to its dissatisfaction by ArcelorMittal's failure to invest more in its operations, including equipment upgrades and safety precautions.

== Geography ==
Karaganda is located in a steppe area of the Kazakh Uplands at an elevation of 546 m (1,791 ft). To the northeast flows the Nura river and to the west the Sherubainura, its main tributary. In the southern part of the city lies the Fedorov Reservoir, built in 1941 by filling a coal mine pit with the water of river Sokyr that flows along the southern limit. The Bugyly Range (Бұғылы), reaching a height of 1,187 m (3,894 ft), rises about 60 km (37 mi) to the south of the city. The Bugyly Nature Reserve is located in the range.

=== Climate ===
Karaganda has a Continental climate (Köppen climate classification Dfb) with warm summers and very cold winters. Precipitation is moderately low throughout the year, although slightly heavier from May to July. Snow is frequent, though light, in winter. The lowest temperature on record is −42.9 °C (−45.2 °F), recorded in 1938, and the highest temperature is 40.2 °C (104.4 °F), recorded in 2002.

Climate data for Karaganda (1991–2020, extremes 1932–present)
Month	Jan	Feb	Mar	Apr	May	Jun	Jul	Aug	Sep	Oct	Nov	Dec	Year
Record high °C (°F)	6.2 (43.2)	7.0 (44.6)	22.3 (72.1)	30.8 (87.4)	35.6 (96.1)	39.1 (102.4)	39.6 (103.3)	40.2 (104.4)	37.4 (99.3)	27.6 (81.7)	18.4 (65.1)	11.5 (52.7)	40.2 (104.4)
Mean daily maximum °C (°F)	−9.2 (15.4)	−7.6 (18.3)	−0.6 (30.9)	12.9 (55.2)	20.4 (68.7)	25.4 (77.7)	26.4 (79.5)	25.5 (77.9)	19.0 (66.2)	10.9 (51.6)	−0.6 (30.9)	−7.1 (19.2)	9.6 (49.3)
Daily mean °C (°F)	−13.4 (7.9)	−12.5 (9.5)	−5.4 (22.3)	6.4 (43.5)	13.5 (56.3)	18.8 (65.8)	20.0 (68.0)	18.6 (65.5)	12.1 (53.8)	4.8 (40.6)	−5.0 (23.0)	−11.2 (11.8)	3.9 (39.0)
Mean daily minimum °C (°F)	−17.7 (0.1)	−17.2 (1.0)	−9.8 (14.4)	0.8 (33.4)	6.9 (44.4)	12.3 (54.1)	13.9 (57.0)	12.1 (53.8)	5.9 (42.6)	−0.1 (31.8)	−8.7 (16.3)	−15.3 (4.5)	−1.4 (29.5)
Record low °C (°F)	−41.7 (−43.1)	−41.0 (−41.8)	−34.7 (−30.5)	−23.9 (−11.0)	−9.5 (14.9)	−2.3 (27.9)	3.2 (37.8)	−0.8 (30.6)	−8.4 (16.9)	−19.3 (−2.7)	−38 (−36)	−42.9 (−45.2)	−42.9 (−45.2)
Average precipitation mm (inches)	25.1 (0.99)	23.6 (0.93)	27.0 (1.06)	30.1 (1.19)	36.8 (1.45)	43.3 (1.70)	51.4 (2.02)	28.6 (1.13)	20.6 (0.81)	29.5 (1.16)	32.8 (1.29)	30.8 (1.21)	379.6 (14.94)
Average extreme snow depth cm (inches)	21 (8.3)	26 (10)	17 (6.7)	1 (0.4)	0 (0)	0 (0)	0 (0)	0 (0)	0 (0)	0 (0)	4 (1.6)	13 (5.1)	26 (10)
Average rainy days	1	1	4	9	14	12	14	10	9	9	6	2	91
Average snowy days	20	19	15	6	1	0	0	0	1	7	15	19	103
Average relative humidity (%)	79	78	78	61	54	50	55	52	53	66	77	78	65
Mean monthly sunshine hours	106	142	189	231	297	335	330	303	247	141	108	99	2,528
Mean daily sunshine hours	3.4	5.0	6.1	7.7	9.6	11.2	10.7	9.8	8.2	4.6	3.6	3.2	6.9
Source 1: Pogoda.ru.net
Source 2: NOAA (sun, 1961–1990), Deutscher Wetterdienst (daily sun 1961-1990)

=== Pollution ===
Due to the prominence of heavy industry in Karaganda, the city experiences a high level of air pollution. Air pollution tracking company IQAir found it to have Kazakhstan's highest level of PM2.5 concentration among cities measured from 2017 to 2022, and the 23rd highest in the world among cities measured.

According to the World Air Quality Report 2024, Karaganda is one of the world's most polluted cities.

== Economy ==
Karaganda is a largely industrial city, and coal mining is a major component of its economy. As of 2023, the city hosts 8 coal mines, and during the times of the Soviet Union, hosted as many as 26.

Since local water resources are not sufficient for the needs of a major industrial city, the Irtysh–Karaganda Canal was constructed in the 1960s, to supply the Karaganda metropolitan area with water from the Irtysh River more than 400 kilometres (250 mi) away.

== Culture ==
=== Religion ===
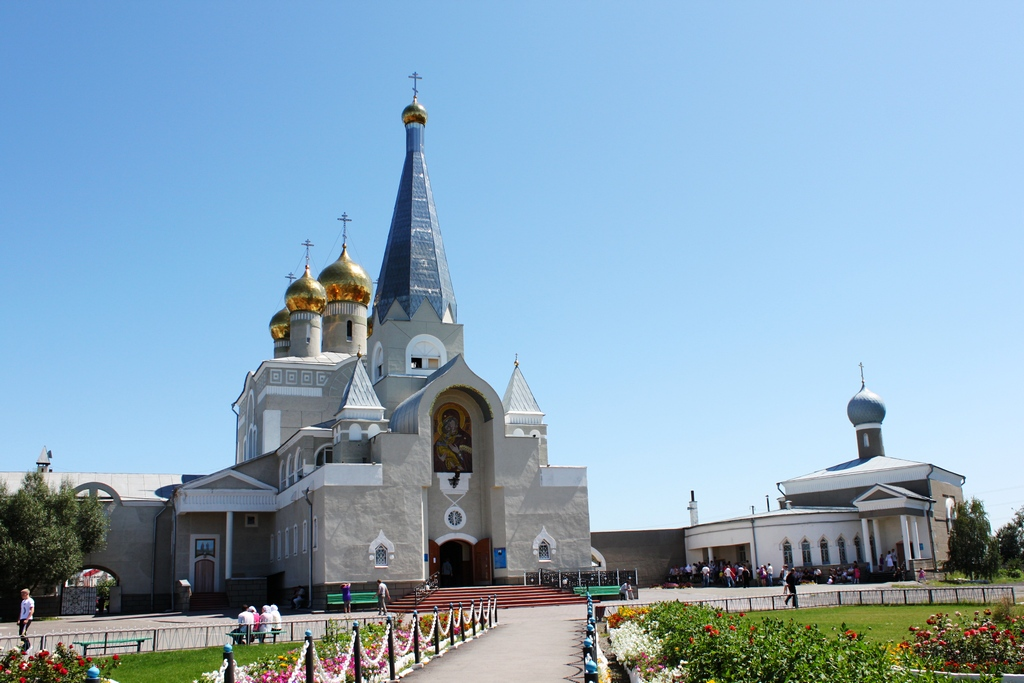
Russian Orthodox Church in Karaganda

The city is the seat of the Roman Catholic Diocese of Karaganda. In 2012, the Catholic Cathedral of the Blessed Virgin Mary of Fatima was opened.

=== Theater ===
The city is home to the Miners' Palace of Culture, a large theater.

=== Sports ===
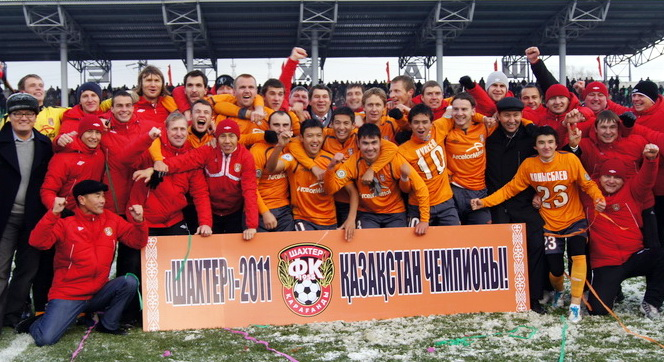
FC Shakhter Karagandy players

FC Shakhter Karagandy is a football club based in the city who play at Shakhtyor Stadium. They finished 7th in the Kazakhstan Premier League in 2022. They last won the competition in the 2012 season and also won the Kazakhstan Cup in 2013. One of the biggest accomplishments of the club is a victory against Celtic from Scotland in the Champions League qualifying rounds in 2013. The score was 2–0. Saryarka Karagandy is an ice hockey team which competes in the Kazakhstan Hockey Championship, and used to play in the Russian-based Supreme Hockey League (VHL)

=== Monuments ===
On 28 May 2011 a monument to a popular catchphrase "Where-where? In Karaganda!" was created.

On 31 May 2022, the Day of Remembrance of the Victims of Political Repressions in the Karaganda Ethnopark, a new monument to the victims of the Holodomor was opened. The monument is located near the mosque on the territory of the Ethnopark, created from granite by Zharmukhamed Tlegenuly. The height of the monument on the pedestal is 1.2 m.

=== Parks ===
The Central Park serves as Karaganda's main park. It was built from 1935 to 1941 and covers an area of 150 hectares (370 acres).

=== Other ===
- Qaraghandy Zoo

=== Education ===
- Karaganda Technical University
- Karaganda University
- Karaganda State Medical University

=== Transport ===
Sary-Arka Airport is 20 kilometers south-east of the city. The city is also served by trains with all of them stopping at Karaganda railway station.

== In popular culture ==
Karaganda was often used as the punchline in a popular joke in the former Soviet Union. Karaganda is fairly isolated in a vast area of uninhabited steppe, and is thought by many to be "the middle of nowhere". When used in the locative case (Караганде), the final syllable rhymes with the Russian word for "where" (где), as well as with a Russian obscenity used to answer to an unwanted question "Where?". Thus the exchange: "Где?" — "В Караганде!" ("Where?" — "In Karaganda!"). In 2011 an art-installation was installed in Karaganda, dedicated to this phrase.

Author Flora Leipman, a British resident who moved to the Soviet Union during the 1930s, wrote about her time in the Karlag Prison near Karaganda, and her subsequent decades where she lived in Karaganda, in her book The Long Journey Home. The labor camp described in One Day in the Life of Ivan Denisovich where the author Aleksandr Solzhenitsyn had served some time was located near Karaganda.

== Notable residents ==
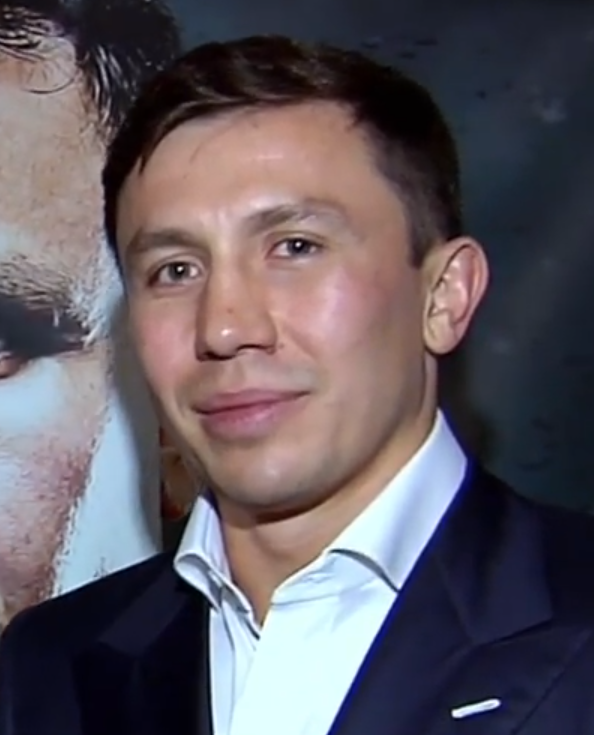
Gennady Golovkin, 2017

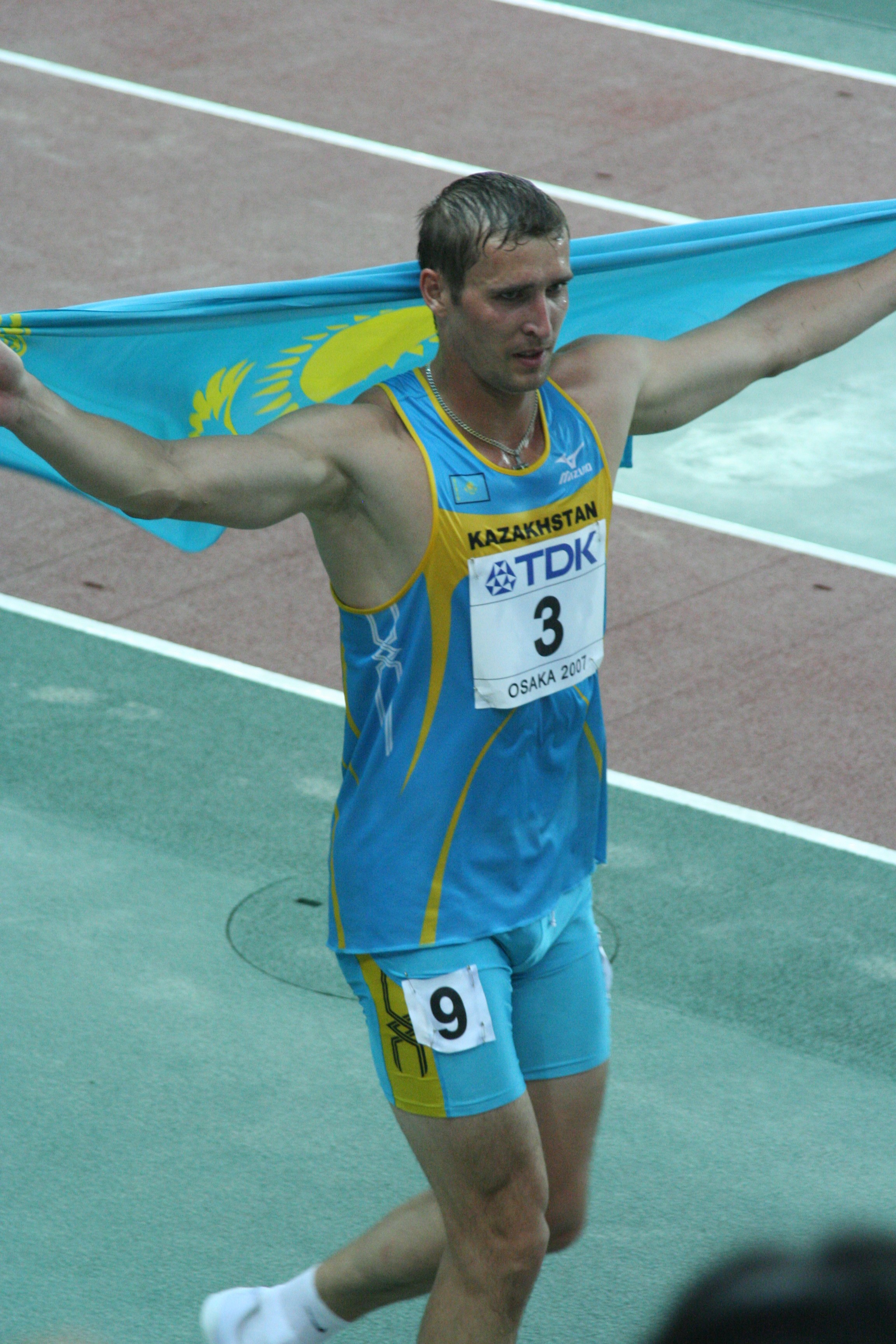
Russian Kazakhstani athlete Dmitriy Karpov

- Gennady Golovkin, boxer, former WBA, WBC, IBF and IBO Middleweight Champion, holds the greatest knockout ratio in middleweight championship history and silver medalist in the 2004 Summer Olympics
- Nurken Abdirov, Soviet World War II pilot and Hero of the Soviet Union. A statue in Abdirov's honor is in the center of the city.
- Anjelika Akbar, pianist
- Toktar Aubakirov, former cosmonaut (Soyuz TM-13) and member of Kazakhstan parliament
- Boris Avrukh, chess grandmaster
- Alexander Dück, professional ice hockey player
- Konstantin Engel, professional football player
- Inna German, female volleyball player.
- Akhmad Kadyrov, former President of the Chechen Republic
- Dimitri Kotschnew, professional ice hockey player
- Andrei Krukov, Olympic figure skater (1998 Winter Olympics)
- Juri Litvinov, Olympic figure skater (1998 Winter Olympics) and national champion
- Aslan Maskhadov, third President, Chechen Republic of Ichkeria
- Valery Oisteanu, writer, photographer, and performance artist
- Aleksandr Shustov, gold medal-winning high jumper
- Dmitriy Karpov, bronze medal-winning decathlon and heptathlon athlete (2004 Summer Olympics)
- Aleksei Grigorievich Stakhanov, Director of Number 31 mine (1943-1957) and Hero of the Soviet Union as a folk hero mine worker with 14 times quota production
- Pavel Vorobiev, professional ice hockey player
- Joseph Werth, Bishop of Transfiguration, Novosibirsk, Russia
- Anatoli Zarapin, Russian professional football coach and former player

== Sister cities ==
- Songpa-gu, South Korea (since 1994)
- Kamianske, Ukraine
- Arak, Iran (since 2008)

== See also ==
- Karlag
- Karaganda Region
