= Miners' Palace of Culture =

Palace of Culture in Karaganda, Kazakhstan

- Кеншілер мәдениет сарайы
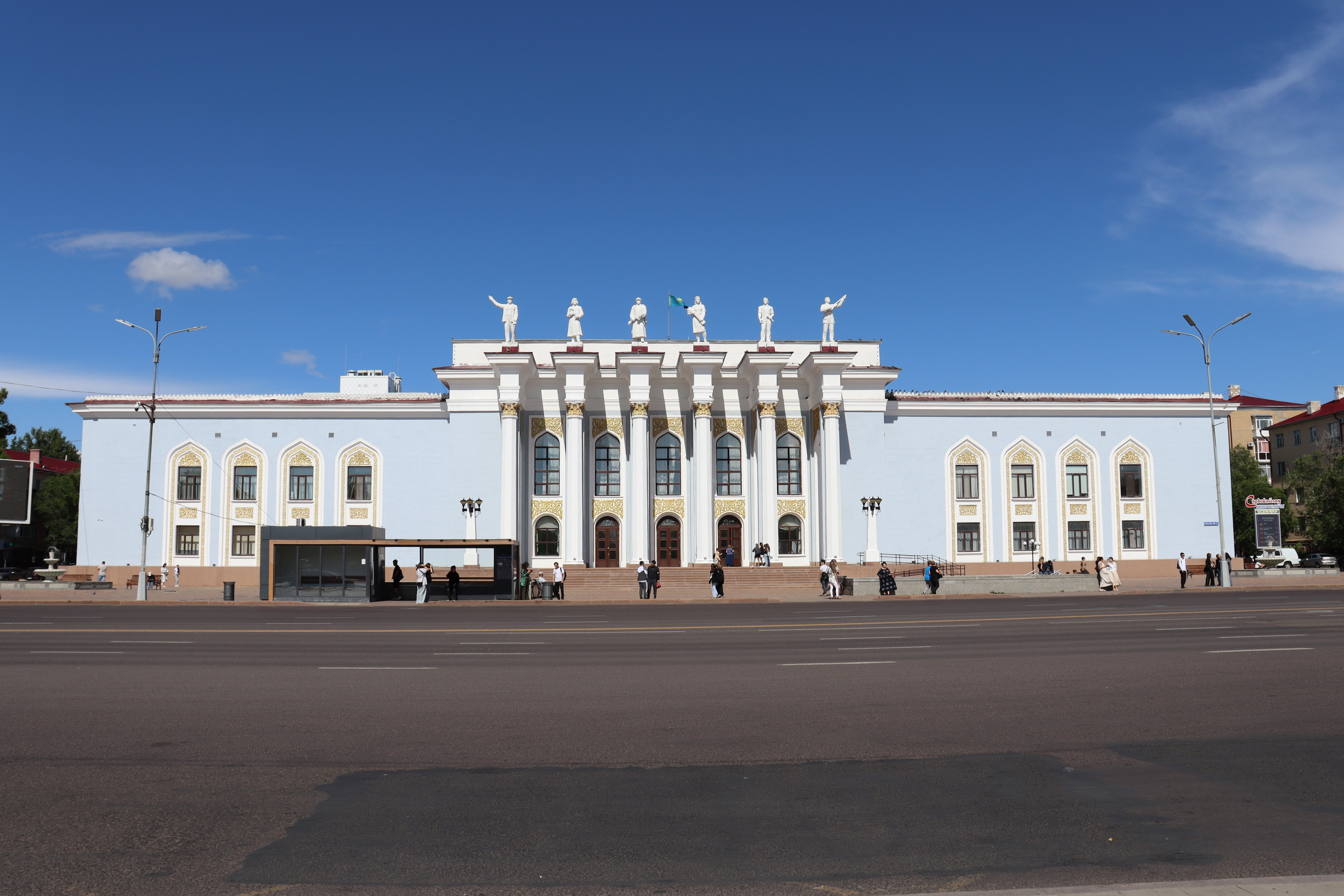
- The Miners' Palace of culture.
- Interactive map of Miners' Palace of Culture
- Location: Karaganda, Kazakhstan
- Coordinates: 49°48′34″N 73°05′03″E
- Type: Palace of Culture
- Completion date: 1952

The Miners' Palace of Culture (Kazakh: Кеншілер мәдениет сарайы, romanized: Kenşıler mädeniet saraiy) is a cultural and architectural landmark located in the city of Karaganda, Kazakhstan. Originally constructed during the Soviet era, it was designed to serve as a hub for community gatherings, artistic performances, and public celebrations.

== History ==
Construction of the Miners' Palace of Culture began in 1940, based on a design by local architects I. Brenner and Ya. Yanosh. Progress was halted due to the outbreak of the Great Patriotic War (the Eastern Front of World War II), but resumed after the conflict ended. The central sections of the building were completed and put into use by late 1950, and the full structure was officially completed by 1952.

Construction was carried out by the Karaganda-based trust "Karagandazhilstroy" (under the direction of A. Maslov) and the Stalinskoye Construction Directorate (headed by Pai).

== Architecture ==
The Miners' Palace of Culture is notable for its monumental Soviet neoclassical style with influences from traditional Kazakh decorative art. The building has a total volume of approximately 70,000 m³ and features a tripartite symmetrical layout. The central section houses a 1,000-seat auditorium, two lobbies, a vestibule, and side aisles.

The façade is characterized by a six-columned portico composed of octagonal columns mounted on pylons, which are set apart from the main wall and connected by pointed, openwork arches. The entablature of the portico is adorned with six allegorical statues representing a miner, shepherd, soldier, collective farmer, engineer, and poet (aqyn). These sculptures were developed based on sketches by Soviet sculptor Yevgeny Vuchetich.

Interior elements include marble-clad walls, bronze stair railings, and ceilings painted by Moscow-based decorative artists K. A. Tutevol and Aksenov. These paintings depict themes of interethnic friendship, consistent with Soviet-era ideological motifs. Additional design work, particularly the ornamental elements, was based on sketches by Kazakh artist Sharila Tugembayeva.

== Cultural Significance ==
Since its opening, the palace has hosted numerous cultural events, performances, and public ceremonies. It has served as a venue for the Kazakh Drama Theater and the Theater of Musical Comedy, making it a central institution in Karaganda’s cultural life.

== See also ==
- Palace of Culture
- Architecture of Kazakhstan
- Karaganda
