= Sherubainura =

River in Kazakhstan

Sherubainura Шерубайнұра
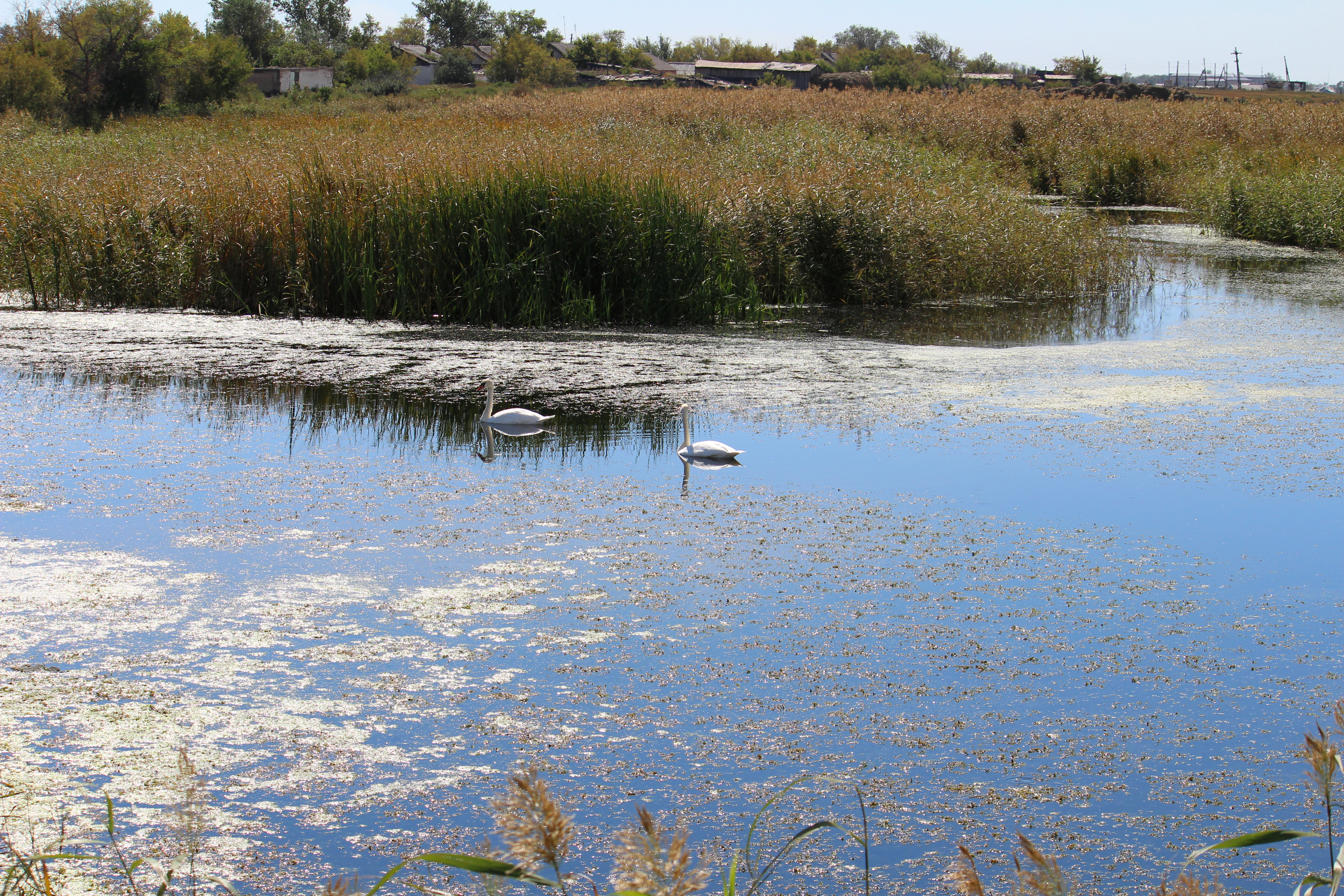
- Near Asyl village

- Mouth location in Kazakhstan

Location
- Countries: Kazakhstan

Physical characteristics
- Source: Kyzyltas; Kazakh Uplands
  - coordinates: 48°50′45″N 74°18′34″E
- Mouth: Nura
  - coordinates: 49°54′28″N 72°30′27″E
- Length: 281 km (175 mi)
- Basin size: 15,400 km^{2} (5,900 sq mi)
- Discharge
  - average: 5.04 cubic metres per second (178 cu ft/s) at Sherubainura

Basin features
- Progression: Nura → Tengiz

The Sherubainura (Kazakh: Шерубайнұра; Russian: Шерубайнура) is a river in the Karaganda Region, Kazakhstan. It is 281 kilometres (175 mi) long and has a catchment area of 15,400 square kilometres (5,900 sq mi).

The river is the main tributary of the Nura. It freezes between November and April. The main settlements near its banks are Rostovka, Kyzylzhar, and Tegiszhol.

== Course ==
The Sherubainura has its sources near the western slopes of the Kyzyltas range of the central Kazakh Uplands. It heads roughly northwestwards among mountains all along its course. Its main tributaries are the Karamys, Taldy, Tumatai, Kyzylkoi, Topar and Sokyr. There are three dams in the river, the Zhartas, the Krasnopolyanskoye and the Sherubaynura Dam. Finally, the Sherubainura reaches the Nura and enters it from the left bank near Zhanatalap (formerly Molodetskoye).

The valley is wide and the river channel is steep, with a width of 10 m (33 ft) on average and rocks protruding above the surface. The deepest parts reach 1.4 m (4 ft 7 in). The river is fed by rainfall and groundwater.

== Fauna ==
The main fish species in the Sherubainura include roach, ide, Prussian carp, pike and tench. There are also crayfish in some stretches.

== See also ==
- List of rivers of Kazakhstan
