= Katynkol =

Lake in Kazakhstan

- Қатынкөл
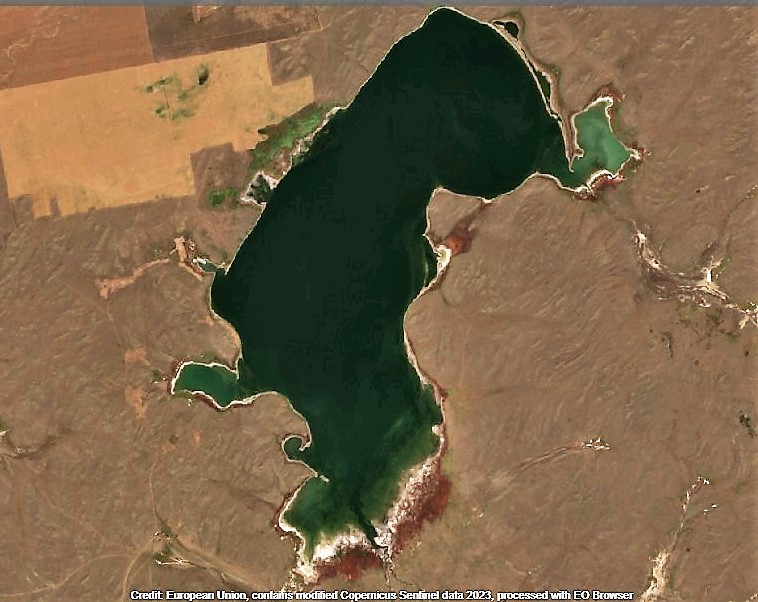
- Sentinel-2 image of the lake in September

- Location within Kazakhstan
- Location: Kazakh Uplands
- Coordinates: 49°44′21″N 75°09′30″E
- Type: endorheic
- Primary inflows: Zharym
- Catchment area: 364 square kilometers (141 sq mi)
- Basin countries: Kazakhstan
- Max. length: 5.5 kilometers (3.4 mi)
- Max. width: 2.2 kilometers (1.4 mi)
- Surface area: 9.5 square kilometers (3.7 sq mi)
- Max. depth: 3.2 meters (10 ft)
- Water volume: 17.04 cubic kilometers (4.09 cu mi)
- Residence time: UTC+6
- Shore length^{1}: 16.3 kilometers (10.1 mi)
- Islands: none
- ^{1} Shore length is not a well-defined measure.

Katynkol (Kazakh: Қатынкөл) is a salt lake in Karkaraly District, Karaganda Region, Kazakhstan.

The lake is located 40 kilometers (25 mi) to the northwest of Karkaraly city. Katynkol usually freezes in November and thaws in April.

== Geography ==
Katynkol is an endorheic lake part of the wide Karasor Basin. Its water is salty, containing sodium and magnesium chlorides. It lies less than 2 kilometers (1.2 mi) to the southwest of the western end of lake Karasor and lake Saumalkol lies 11 kilometers (6.8 mi) to the northwest of the northwestern shore. There is a headland in the northeastern lakeshore forming a wide bay in the northern sector of the lake. There are as well several small inlets, forming indentations up to 1 kilometer (0.62 mi) in length. Part of the shore is steep, bound by grey sandstone cliffs of moderate height.

The lake stretches from north to south for 5.5 kilometers (3.4 mi). It is fed mainly by melted snow and groundwater, as well as some precipitation and rarely dries in the summer. River Zharym, having its sources in the northern slopes of the Karkaraly Range, flows from the south into the southern end of the lake.

== Flora ==
The land around Katynkol consists largely of plowed agricultural fields. The vegetation of the flat terraced areas by the lakeshore includes fescue, wormwood, licorice and needlegrass.

== See also ==
- List of lakes of Kazakhstan
