= Karkaraly (disambiguation) =

Karkaraly may refer to:

- Karkaraly, a city in Karkaraly District, Karaganda Region, Kazakhstan
- Karkaraly District, Karaganda Region, Kazakhstan
- Karkaraly (river), a river in the Kazakh Uplands, Kazakhstan
- Karkaraly Range, a range of mountains in the Kazakh Uplands, Kazakhstan
- Karkaraly National Park, a protected area in Karaganda Region, Kazakhstan
