= Karagayly (disambiguation) =

Karagayly may refer to:

- Karagayly, a village in the Almaty Region, Kazakhstan
- Karagaily, a mining town in Karkaraly District, Karaganda Region, Kazakhstan
- Karagayly, Beloretsky District, Republic of Bashkortostan, Russian Federation
