= Balyktykol (Karasor Basin) =

Lake in Kazakhstan

- Балықтыкөл
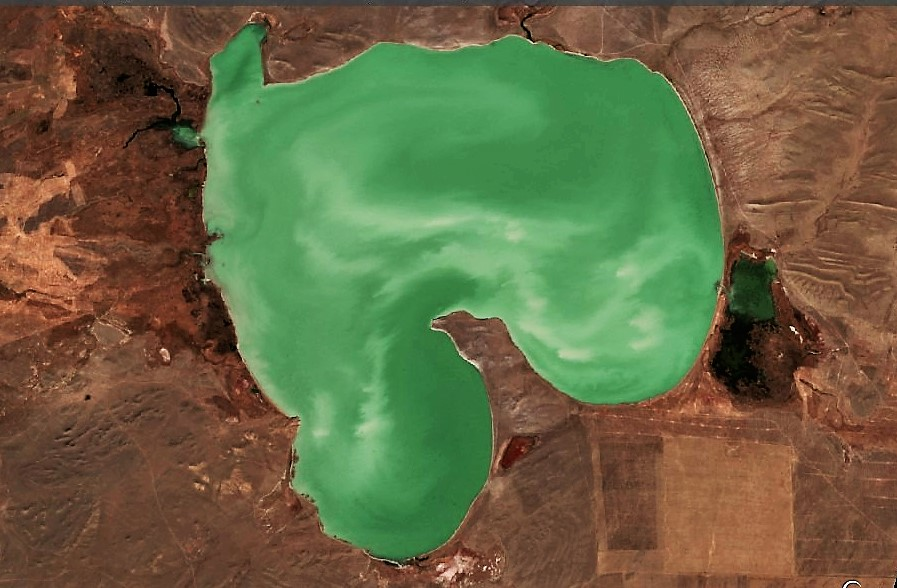
- Sentinel-2 image of the lake in October 2021

- Location within Kazakhstan
- Location: Kazakh Uplands
- Coordinates: 49.79°N 75.94°E
- Primary inflows: Ozdenbay
- Primary outflows: Taldy
- Catchment area: 565 km^{2} (218 sq mi)
- Basin countries: Kazakhstan
- Max. length: 6.5 km (4.0 mi)
- Max. width: 6.5 km (4.0 mi)
- Surface area: 42 km^{2} (16 sq mi)
- Max. depth: 3.8 m (12 ft)
- Residence time: UTC+6

Balyktykol (Kazakh: Балықтыкөл; Russian: Балыктыколь) is a lake in Karkaraly District, Karaganda Region, Kazakhstan.

The lake is located 42 km (26 mi) to the NNE of Karkaraly city. The nearest inhabited places are Karabulak 10 km (6.2 mi) to the southeast, Yegindybulak 30 km (19 mi) to the east by Mount Ku, and Koyandy village 25 km (16 mi) to the NW of the northwestern lakeshore. The lake is an Important Bird Area under threat.

== Geography ==
Balyktykol is a heart-shaped lake in the central/eastern Kazakh Uplands. It lies at the eastern end of the Karasor Basin, about 20 km (12 mi) to the east of lake Karasor and 24 km (15 mi) to the south of Saumalkol, surrounded by low hills. The lakeshores are low and gently sloping in the northwest and in the east, but in the remaining stretches they are rocky, with steep cliffs. There is a 2.5 km (1.6 mi) long and 0.7 km (0.43 mi) wide peninsula in the southeast dividing the southern part into two bays. The bottom of the lake is sand and mud.

The water of Balyktykol is fresh but hard. The lake is fed by snow, rainfall and underground water. The Ozdenbay River flows into the lake from the north and the Taldy flows from the south and bends westwards close to the NW lakeshore heading towards lake Karasor. The highest water level is in April during the spring floods, and the lowest usually in October. The lake freezes in November and thaws in April.

== Flora and fauna ==
There is steppe vegetation around Balyktykol, with wormwood and sedges. In some areas meadows are fringing the banks with fescue, spear grass, Neotrinia splendens and Caragana growing tall. Every year at the lake there is a large concentration of migratory birds. The main fish species in the lake are crucian carp and common bream.

== See also ==
- List of lakes of Kazakhstan
