= Matak, Kazakhstan =

Coordinates: 49°41′41.7″N 74°40′15.1″E

Matak Матақ
- Selo
- Mataq
- Location in Kazakhstan
- Country: Kazakhstan
- Region: Karaganda Region

Population (2009)
  - Total: 518
- Postal code: 100818
- Area code: +7 72146

Matak (Kazakh: Матақ) is a selo in the Karkaraly District of the Karaganda Region in Kazakhstan. It is the administrative centre and the only settlement in the Ugarskiy Village District. It is located approximately 66 km from the regional capital, the city of Karkaraly.

== Population ==
In 1999, the population of the selo was 669 people (335 men and 334 women). According to the 2009 census, the total population was 518 people (263 men and 255 women).
