= Zheltau (massif) =

Mountain range in Kazakhstan

- Желтау
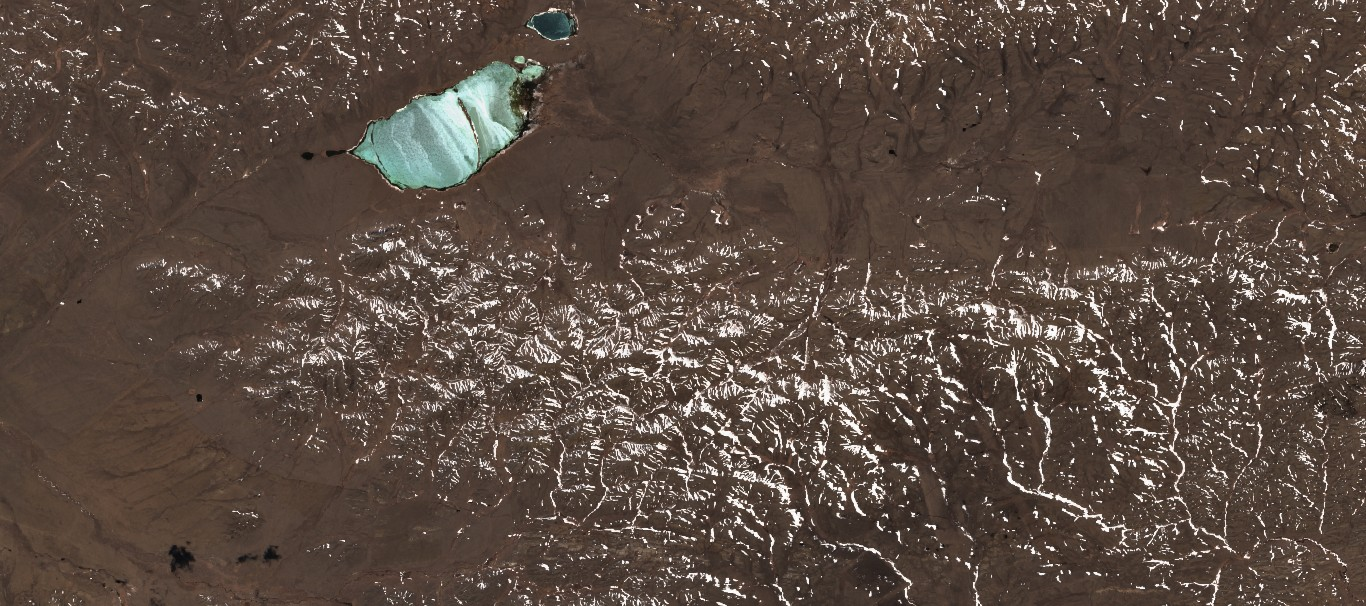
- Sentinel-2 image centered on the Zheltau

Highest point
- Peak: Zheltau
- Elevation: 959 m (3,146 ft)
- Coordinates: 50°13′05″N 75°43′52″E

Dimensions
- Length: 22 km (14 mi) E/W
- Width: 7 km (4.3 mi) N/S

Geography
- Location within Kazakhstan
- Location: Kazakhstan
- Range coordinates: 50°13′30″N 75°45′00″E
- Parent range: Kazakh Uplands

Geology
- Orogeny: Alpine orogeny
- Rock age(s): Devonian and Middle and Upper Carboniferous
- Rock type: Granitoids

Climbing
- Easiest route: From Yegindybulak

Zheltau (Kazakh: Желтау; Russian: Горы Жельтау) is a massif located in Karkaraly District, Karaganda Region and Bayanaul District, Pavlodar Region, Kazakhstan.

The border between Karaganda Region and Pavlodar Region runs from east to west along the mountain massif. Zhanatilek lies 50 kilometers (31 mi) to the northwest and Yegindybulak town 65 kilometers (40 mi) to the southeast.

== Geography ==
Zheltau is located in the Kazakh Uplands, 13 kilometers (8.1 mi) to the southwest of the Kyzyltau. The massif rises just to the south of the southern shore of lake Shalkarkol. Lake Saumalkol lies 15 kilometers (9.3 mi) to the south of the southern edge. The Ashchysu river flows to the west of the western end and the Kyrgyn, its right tributary, heads northwestward close to the southern slopes. The Karasu has its sources on the southern side of the highest summits and flows towards lake Karasor.

The Zheltau consists of an elongated cluster of hills rising quite detached from each other. The relief is generally steep, deeply cut by river valleys and ravines. The highest point of the massif is 959 metres (3,146 ft) high Mt Zheltau, rising in the central sector. Now abandoned Zheltau village was located at the feet of the northern slopes of the range.

== Flora ==
The mountains are covered in parts with resilient low vegetation, such as Artemisia austriaca, Chamaesphacos, Festuca, Helictotrichon and Caragana, most plant growth is found in riverside meadows.

== See also ==
- Geography of Kazakhstan
