= Zhananegiz =

Zhananegiz Жаңанегіз
- Selo
- Jañanegız
- Location in Kazakhstan
- Coordinates: 49°28′37″N 75°30′50″E
- Country: Kazakhstan
- Region: Karaganda Region
- District: Karkaraly District

Population (2009)
  - Total: 151

Zhananegiz (Kazakh: Жаңанегіз, Russian: Жананегиз) is a selo in the Karkaraly District of the Karaganda Region in Kazakhstan. It is a part of the Martbek Rural District. Code CATO - 354873300.

== Population ==
In the year 1999, the population of the village was 201 people (110 men and 91 women). According to the 2009 census, 151 people lived in the village (78 men and 73 women).
