= Karashoky (Karaganda Region) =

Karashoky Қарашоқы
- Selo
- Qarashoqy
- Location in Kazakhstan
- Coordinates: 49°29′00″N 74°30′24″E
- Country: Kazakhstan
- Region: Karaganda Region

Population (2009)
  - Total: 97

Karashoky (Kazakh: Қарашоқы) is a selo in the Karkaraly District of the Karaganda Region in Kazakhstan. It is a part of the Besobinskiy Village District.

== Population ==
In the year 1999, the population of the selo was 188 people (97 men and 91 women). According to the 2009 census, there were 97 people (48 men and 49 women).
