= Karasu (Karasor) =

River in Kazakhstan

Karasu Қарасу
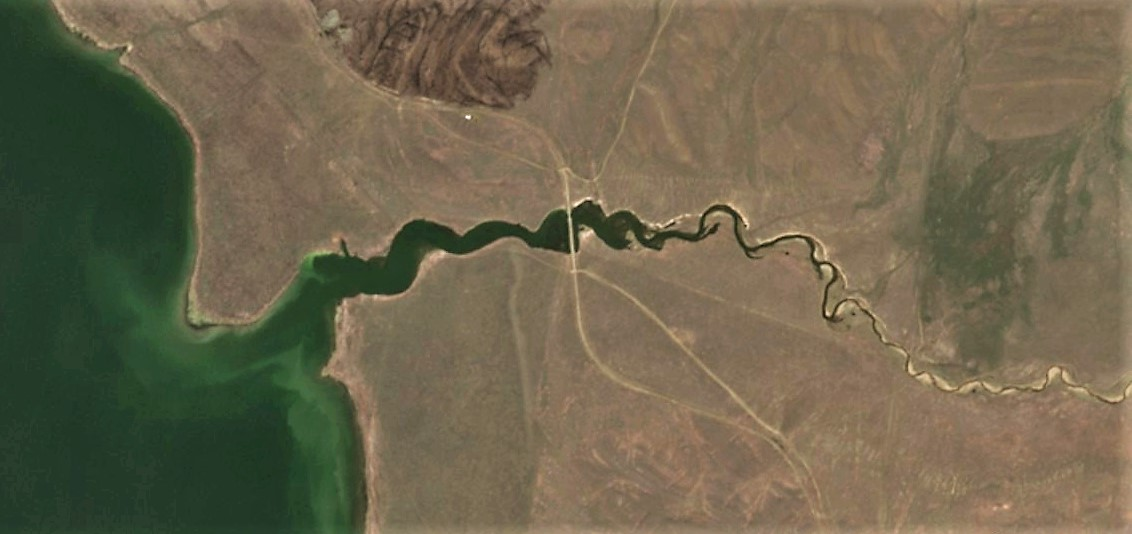
- Last stretch of the Karasu river and mouth in lake Karasor.

- Mouth location in Kazakhstan

Location
- Countries: Kazakhstan

Physical characteristics
- Source: Zheltau; Kazakh Uplands
  - coordinates: 50°13′12″N 75°46′13″E
  - elevation: ca 900 m (3,000 ft)
- Mouth: Karasor
  - coordinates: 49°54′00″N 75°36′59″E
  - elevation: 622 meters (2,041 ft)
- Length: 57 km (35 mi)
- Basin size: 661 km^{2} (255 sq mi)

The Karasu (Kazakh: Қарасу; Russian: Карасу) is a river in Karkaraly District, Karaganda Region, Kazakhstan. It is 57 kilometres (35 mi) long and has a basin of 661 km^{2} (255 sq mi).

The Karasu is one of the longest rivers flowing into endorheic lake Karasor. There are no settlements near its banks. The nearest inhabited place is Koyandy village, 5 kilometres (3.1 mi) to the southeast of the river's mouth. A bridge crosses the river 1.5 kilometres (0.93 mi) upstream from its mouth.

== Course ==
The Karasu has its sources in the southern slopes of the highest part of the Zheltau Massif, central Kazakh Uplands, at the border of Pavlodar Region. It heads roughly southwards as a mountain river. In its middle course it bends westwards and in this last stretch it flows roughly parallel to the Taldy to the south. Finally it enters Karasor close to the northeastern corner of the lake.

The left bank of the Karasu river channel is steep. There are small salt lakes by the right bank of the middle reaches of its course. A few kilometers upstream of its mouth the channel becomes wide. The riverbanks in the lower basin are used for local livestock grazing. The Karasu is fed by snow and groundwater. Usually it is at its highest level in mid April, with the melting of the snows. The water in the channel usually flows all year round and freezes between early November and early to mid April. The river has 15 tributaries with a total length of 49 kilometres (30 mi). The longest is the 18 kilometres (11 mi) long Zhandar.

== See also ==
- List of rivers of Kazakhstan
