= Saumalkol, N Karkaraly District =

Lake in Kazakhstan

Saumalkol
- Саумалкөл
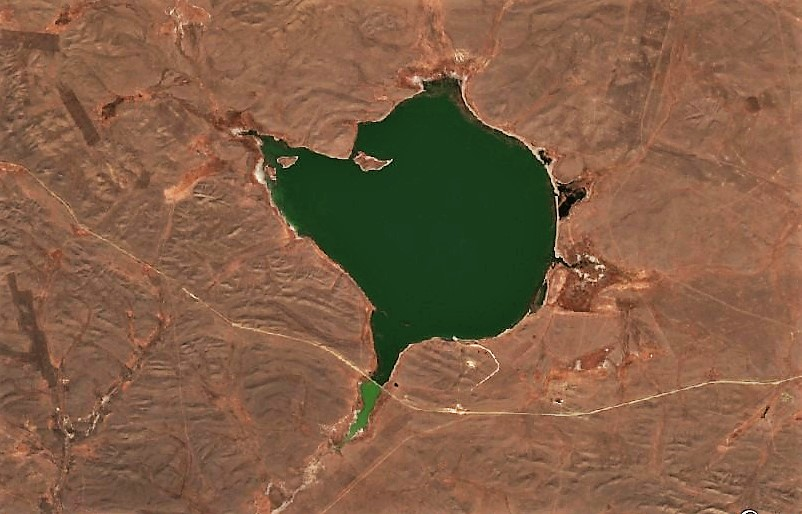
- Sentinel-2 image of the lake

- Location within Kazakhstan
- Location: Kazakh Uplands
- Coordinates: 50°02′51″N 75°59′21″E
- Type: endorheic
- Primary outflows: none
- Catchment area: 107 square kilometers (41 sq mi)
- Basin countries: Kazakhstan
- Max. length: 3.6 kilometers (2.2 mi)
- Max. width: 2.7 kilometers (1.7 mi)
- Surface area: 6.52 square kilometers (2.52 sq mi)
- Average depth: 2.7 meters (8 ft 10 in)
- Water volume: 0.009 cubic kilometers (0.0022 cu mi)
- Residence time: UTC+6
- Shore length^{1}: 13.3 kilometers (8.3 mi)
- Surface elevation: 679.8 meters (2,230 ft)
- Islands: 2
- ^{1} Shore length is not a well-defined measure.

Saumalkol (Kazakh: Саумалкөл; Russian: Саумалколь) is a salt lake located in northern part of Karkaraly District, Karaganda Region, Kazakhstan.

The lake is partly surrounded by agricultural fields, with the nearest inhabited location being the town of Terekty, situated 10 kilometers (6.2 mi) to the east-southeast.

== Geography ==
Saumalkol is an endorheic lake located in the central Kazakh Uplands. It lies 15 kilometers (9.3 mi) to the south of Zheltau, 31 kilometers (19 mi) to the northeast of the northeastern end of Lake Karasor and 24 kilometers (15 mi) to the north of Lake Balyktykol. The southeastern shore of the lake is characterized by steep cliffs reaching up to 13 meters (43 ft) in height.

The lake is shallow, with a maximum depth of 2.7 meters (8 ft 10 in) and its waters are salty and bitter, containing iodine, fluorine, bromine and boron. The bottom of the lake is muddy.

Saumalkol is primarily fed by snow and groundwater. Two springs flow from the north into the lake, and the shores are muddy with some areas overgrown by reeds. Additionally, two small islets are located near the northwestern shore.

== See also ==
- List of lakes of Kazakhstan
