= Karasor (disambiguation) =

Karasor (Kazakh: Қарасор; "black saline land") may refer to:

- Karasor, a lake in Karkaraly District, Karaganda Region, Kazakhstan
- Karasor Basin, a structural depression in Karkaraly District, Karaganda Region, Kazakhstan
- Karasor, May District, a lake in May District, Pavlodar Region, Kazakhstan
- Karasor (lake, Ekibastuz), a lake in Pavlodar Region, Kazakhstan
