= Besoba (Karaganda Region) =

Besoba Бесоба
- Selo
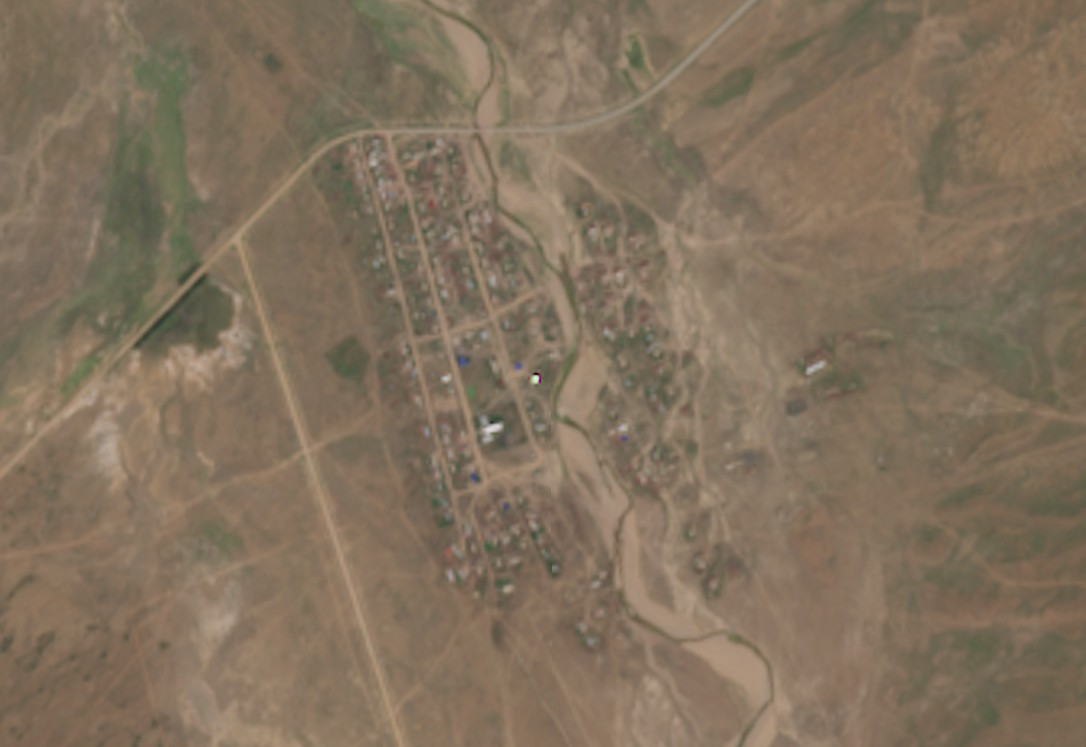
- Besoba as viewed from space (Sentinel-2 L1C satellite data, modified)

- Location in Kazakhstan
- Coordinates: 49°20′47″N 74°28′07″E
- Country: Kazakhstan
- Region: Karaganda Region

Population (2009)
  - Total: 1,062
- Postal code: 100808
- Area code: +7 72132

Besoba (Kazakh: Бесоба) is a selo in the Karkaraly District of the Karaganda Region in Kazakhstan. It is the administrative centre of the Besobinskiy Village District.

== Population ==
In the year 1999, the population of the selo was 1302 people (697 men and 605 women). According to the 2009 census, there were 1062 people (552 men and 510 women).

== Geography ==
It is located on the Baykozha river and fairly close (≈18 km away) from the source of the Nura. Lies to the north-east of the Zhamantas mountains and ≈73 km west of the capital of the district, the town of Karkaraly.

=== Climate ===
Climate data for Besoba (1991-2020)
Month	Jan	Feb	Mar	Apr	May	Jun	Jul	Aug	Sep	Oct	Nov	Dec	Year
Mean daily maximum °C (°F)	−9.3 (15.3)	−7.5 (18.5)	−0.1 (31.8)	12.5 (54.5)	19.9 (67.8)	25.0 (77.0)	26.1 (79.0)	24.9 (76.8)	18.6 (65.5)	10.7 (51.3)	−0.5 (31.1)	−7.0 (19.4)	9.4 (49.0)
Daily mean °C (°F)	−14.7 (5.5)	−13.6 (7.5)	−6.0 (21.2)	5.4 (41.7)	12.2 (54.0)	17.7 (63.9)	18.9 (66.0)	17.3 (63.1)	10.7 (51.3)	3.5 (38.3)	−6.2 (20.8)	−12.1 (10.2)	2.8 (37.0)
Mean daily minimum °C (°F)	−19.7 (−3.5)	−19.2 (−2.6)	−11.3 (11.7)	−0.9 (30.4)	4.6 (40.3)	10.2 (50.4)	12.0 (53.6)	9.8 (49.6)	3.5 (38.3)	−2.3 (27.9)	−11.0 (12.2)	−17.0 (1.4)	−3.4 (25.8)
Average precipitation mm (inches)	5.2 (0.20)	7.1 (0.28)	8.5 (0.33)	17.7 (0.70)	25.7 (1.01)	31.1 (1.22)	43.7 (1.72)	24.0 (0.94)	14.2 (0.56)	17.1 (0.67)	15.2 (0.60)	8.1 (0.32)	217.6 (8.55)
Average precipitation days (≥ 1mm)	1.8	2.2	2.8	4.2	5.3	6.1	7.0	4.1	2.9	4.6	4.3	2.9	48.2
