= Intaly (Karaganda Region) =

Coordinates: 49°41′36″N 74°22′08″E

Intaly Ынталы
- Village
- Location in Kazakhstan
- Country: Kazakhstan
- Region: Karaganda
- District: Karkaraly District

Population (2009)
  - Total: 801
- Postal code: 100825

Intaly (Kazakh: Ынталы) is a village in the Karkaraly District of the Karaganda Region of Kazakhstan. It is the administrative center and the only populated area of the Intaly Rural District. CATO code is 354889100.

== Population ==
In 1999, the village population was 1,106 people (542 men and 564 women). According to the 2009 census, the village had a population of 801 people (412 men and 389 women).
