= Burkitty (Karaganda Region) =

Burkitty Бүркітті
- Selo
- Bürkittı
- Location in Kazakhstan
- Coordinates: 49.47702°N 75.872991°E
- Country: Kazakhstan
- Region: Karaganda Region
- District: Karkaraly District
- Village District: Kyrgyz Village District

Population (2009)
  - Total: 1,311
- Postal code: 100809
- Area code: +7 72146

Burkitty (Kazakh: Бүркітті, also transliterated as Bürkittı) is a village (selo) in the Karkaraly District of the Karaganda Region, Kazakhstan. It is the administrative centre of the Kyrgyz Village District. The CATO code is 354869100.

== History ==
During the Soviet era, Burkitty was home to the state farm (sovkhoz) "Kirgiziya" in Karkaraly District. In the 1930s, it was known as the kolkhoz "Enbek-Suygish," and later renamed "Komsomolsky." Among its workers was Topai Konyrbaev, a shepherd who was awarded the title Hero of Socialist Labour.

== Population ==
In the 1999 census, the population of the village was 1,461 (759 men and 702 women). According to the 2009 National Population Census, the population had decreased to 1,311 (637 men and 674 women).
