= Koyandy Fair =

Annual trade fair every June from 1848 to 1930 in Kazakhstan

The Koyandy Fair (Kazakh: Қоянды жәрмеңкесі) was a large annual trade fair held every June from 1848 to 1930 in the Karkaraly region of Kazakhstan on the caravan route from Central Asia to Siberia. Koyandy is located west of modern-day Yegindybulak, near lake Karasor.

== Origins ==
The Koyandy Fair opened in 1848 when merchant Barnabas Botov first began buying cattle on the banks of the Taldy north of Karkaraly. The following year, new buyers arrived and soon people from Kazakhstan, Siberia, the Urals, Central Asia and western China were visiting the fair.

Because of the nomadic nature of the people’s lives, they waited until summer to sell their livestock and purchase necessary goods. It has been reported that a two-year-old ram was worth 2 silver rubles.

== The prosperous years ==
In 1869, the Karkaraly regional administration filed an application to officially recognize the trade fair. By 1900 the Koyandy Fair had 30 stores, 276 shops and 707 yurts in the area of 55 square kilometres (21 sq mi). The fair was organized in four long rows. In the two central rows were Russian and Siberian merchants trading iron and copper goods, textiles and tea. In the other two rows were merchants from Kazakhstan, Central Asia and China. They traded silks, oriental sweets, carpets, drinks, bread, leather, grains, textiles, and much more. However, the main product of the fair was livestock. Every year over 200,000 horses, cows, sheep and goats were sold.

For the years of its operation, the Koyandy Fair was the largest of its kind in the steppe region. By 1913, the turnover at the fair approached five million rubles. Anything could be found at the fair: English clothes, Belgian lace, Paris perfumes, and more. One merchant raised so much money that upon his death, his children made a headstone of black marble for him, something that was unprecedented in this area of the world.

In the years of revolution and civil war, the fair stopped. But it was revived again in 1923. By then, the fair had grown dramatically. There was a newspaper, library, playground, and a health center. Radios were present and for the first time, people were able to listen to broadcasts from Moscow. A “bureaucratic corner” was created, where a post-office, bank and courthouse were all built.

The fair was a celebration for all. Wrestlers, circus performers, magicians, orators were all common. Visiting Akyns, singers and dombra players included Maira Ualukyzy, Kalybek Kuanyshpaev and paluan Hadzhi Mukana. Land disputes and claims cases were settled at the fair. Many famous people of the day visited the fair. Abai Kunanbaev (the father of Kazakh literature) and Baluan Sholak (composer and famous wrestler) are known to have visited the fair. At the age of 49, Sholak accepted a fight from a well-known fighter named Carona, at the Koyandy Fair and during the fight broke several ribs.

== Closure ==
Kazakh society was changing though and people were less nomadic than in previous years. Largely due to this, the fair was closed in 1930. Today, all that is left are a few dilapidated buildings, warehouses, shops and a chapel. For 80 years the fair played a major role in the development of the region as a center of business and entertainment.
