= Mount Ku =

Range of mountains in Kazakhstan

- Қу тауы
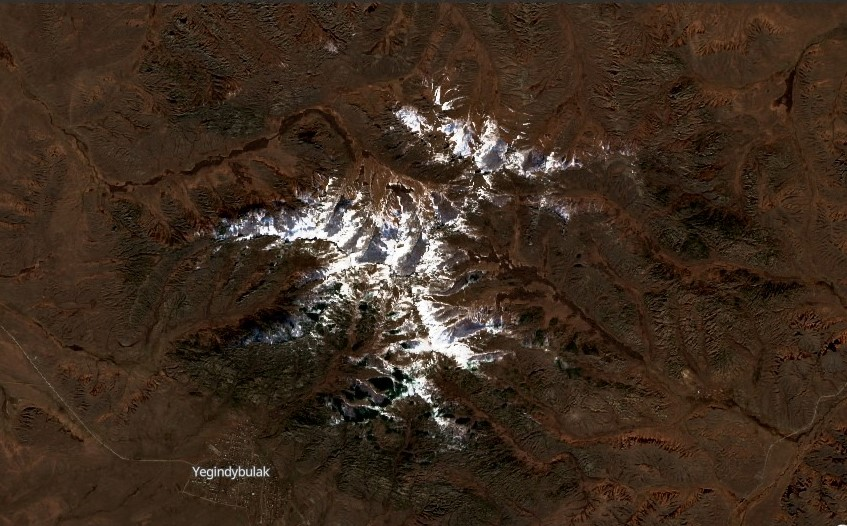
- Mount Ku Sentinel-2 image

Highest point
- Elevation: 1,356 m (4,449 ft)

Dimensions
- Length: 20 km (12 mi) NW / SE
- Width: 12 km (7.5 mi) NE / SW

Geography
- Location within Kazakhstan
- Location: Kazakhstan
- Range coordinates: 49°49′N 76°46′E
- Parent range: Kazakh Uplands

Geology
- Orogeny: Alpine orogeny
- Rock age(s): Silurian and Devonian
- Rock type(s): Granite and diorite

Mount Ku (Kazakh: Қу тауы) is a mountain massif in the Karkaraly District, Karaganda Region, Kazakhstan.

Yegindybulak village lies at the feet of the southwestern slopes of the mountain. The Ku Zazaznik, a 33,500 hectares (83,000 acres) protected area, is located in Mount Ku.

== Geography ==
Mount Ku is part of the Kazakh Upland system (Saryarka). It is a compact-shaped range of moderate altitude located in the northeastern sector of the highlands. The Myrzhyk massif lies 40 kilometers (25 mi) to the ENE of the eastern slopes, the Bakty Range 35 kilometers (22 mi) to the south, and the Kent Range 60 kilometers (37 mi) to the SSW. Lake Balyktykol lies 30 kilometers (19 mi) to the west.

The highest point of Mount Ku is a 1,356 meters (4,449 ft) high summit. There are springs at the foot of the mountains.

== Flora ==
The summits of Mont Ku are rocky. The soil is dark brown. Sparse pine forests grow on some of the lower slope areas. The valleys and small gorges have shrub growth, as well as willow and birch thickets.

== See also ==
- Geography of Kazakhstan
