= Koyandy =

Koyandy Қоянды
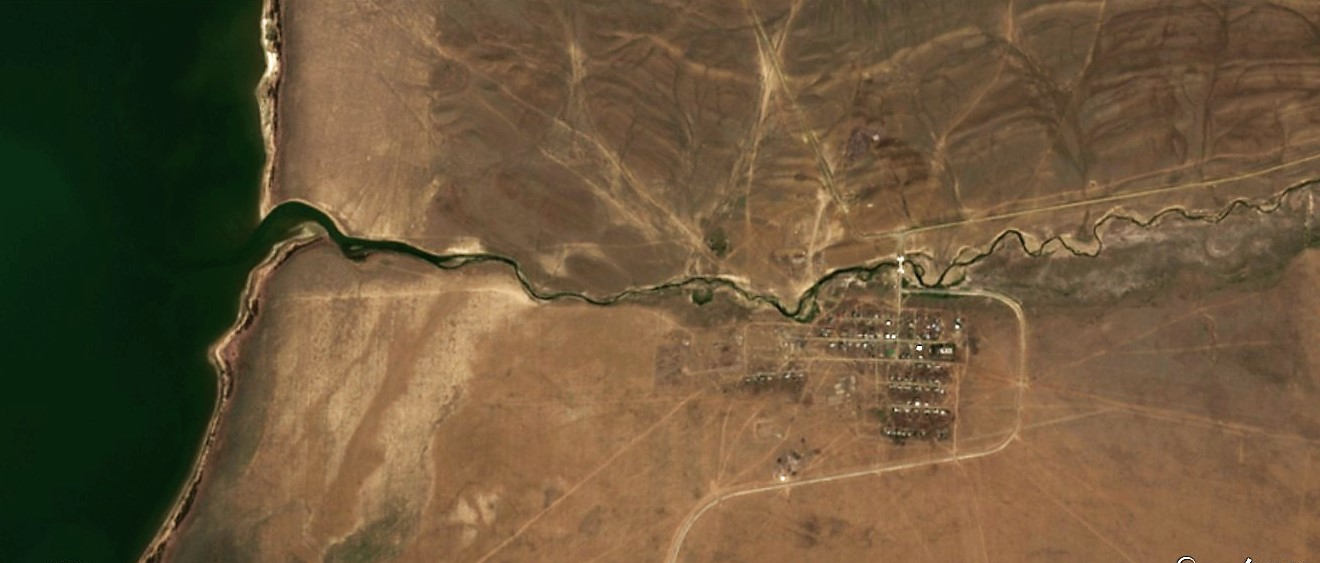
- River Taldy by Koyandy and mouth in lake Karasor.

- Location in Kazakhstan
- Coordinates: 49°52′05″N 75°40′28″E
- Country: Kazakhstan
- Region: Karaganda Region
- District: Karkaraly District

Population (2009)
  - Total: 479
- Time zone: UTC+6
- Postcode: 100817

Koyandy (Kazakh: Қоянды) is a settlement in Karkaraly District, Karaganda Region, Kazakhstan. It is the administrative center and only settlement of the Koyandy rural district (KATO code - 354871100). Population: 479 (2009 census results); 798 (1999 census results). The Koyandy Fair was held in the village until 1930.

== Population ==
In 1999, the population of the village was 798 people (410 men and 388 women). According to the 2009 census, 479 people lived in the village (270 men and 209 women).

== Geography ==
Koyandy lies by the left bank of the Taldy river in the Kazakh Uplands about 53 kilometers (33 mi) to the north of the district capital Karkaraly. Lake Karasor lies 11 kilometers (6.8 mi) to the west.
