= Yegindybulak =

Settlement in Karkaraly District, Karaganda Region, Kazakhstan

- Location in Kazakhstan
- Coordinates: 49°47′08″N 76°23′07″E
- Country: Kazakhstan
- Region: Karaganda Region
- District: Karkaraly District

Population (2009)
  - Total: 3,399
- Time zone: UTC+6 (UTC +6)
- Postcode: 100810
- Area code: +7 72147

Yegindybulak (Kazakh: Егіндібұлақ, Egindibulaq) is a settlement in Karkaraly District, Karaganda Region, Kazakhstan. It is the administrative center of the Yegindybulak Rural District (KATO code - 354851100). Population: 3,399 (2009 census results); 4,165 (1999 census results).

== History ==
The Koyandy Fair, a large annual trade fair held every June from 1848 to 1930, was located by the banks of the Taldy river, southwest of modern-day Yegindybulak on the caravan route from Central Asia to Siberia. Yegindybulak was the administrative center of Kazybekbi District, a defunct administrative division of the Karaganda Region from 1928 to 1963 and again between 1964 and 1997.

== Geography ==
Yegindybulak is located on a dry steppe area at the feet of Mount Ku. The terrain to the north of the town is mountainous. Lake Balyktykol lies 30 kilometers (19 mi) to the west. Nearby settlements include Karabulak (west southwest), Terekti (northwest), Osibay (northeast), and Kiikqashqan and Dogalan (southeast).
