= Saumalkol (Karasor Basin) =

Lake in Kazakhstan

- Саумалкөл
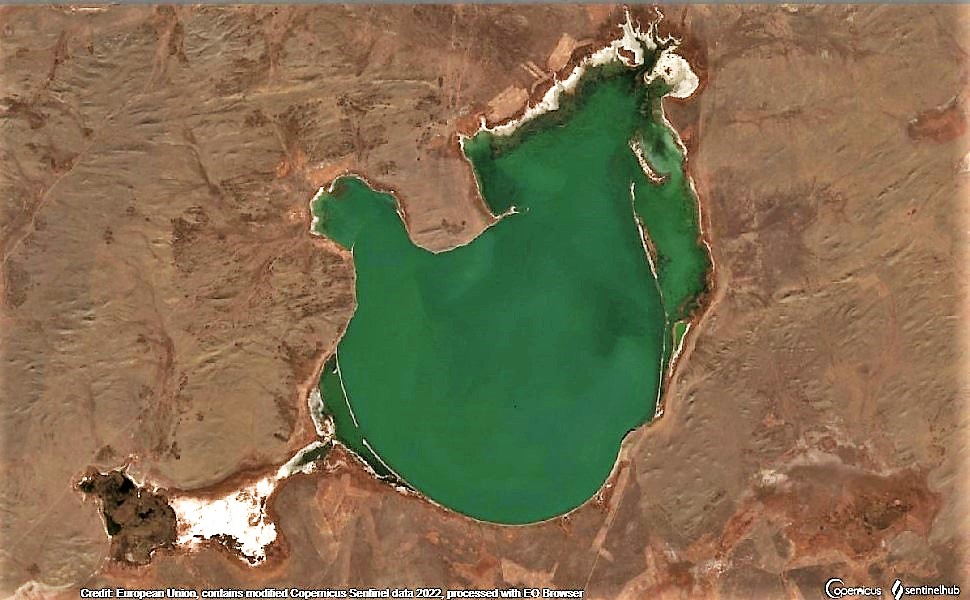
- Sentinel-2 image of the lake

- Location within Kazakhstan
- Location: Kazakh Uplands
- Coordinates: 49°49′N 75°00′E
- Type: endorheic
- Primary outflows: none
- Catchment area: 307 square kilometers (119 sq mi)
- Basin countries: Kazakhstan
- Max. length: 6 kilometers (3.7 mi)
- Max. width: 4.7 kilometers (2.9 mi)
- Surface area: 20.2 square kilometers (7.8 sq mi)
- Average depth: 1.5 meters (4 ft 11 in)
- Residence time: UTC+6
- Surface elevation: 632 meters (2,073 ft)

Saumalkol (Kazakh: Саумалкөл; Russian: Саумалколь) is a salt lake in northwestern Karkaraly District, Karaganda Region, Kazakhstan.

The lake is located 50 kilometers (31 mi) to the northwest of Karkaraly city. The nearest inhabited place is Saumalkol railway station 5 kilometers (3.1 mi) to the southwest. The lake is a 2,171 hectares (5,360 acres) Important Bird Area part of the Korgalzhyn Nature Reserve.

== Geography ==
Saumalkol is an endorheic lake in the central Kazakh Uplands. It lies at the feet of the southern slopes of the Ayr Mountains. Located 8 kilometers (5.0 mi) to the west of the western end of lake Karasor, it is the second largest of the lakes of the Karasor Basin, a vast depression. The southern shore of the lake is flat, but the northern is steep with up to 15 meters (49 ft) high cliffs. There is a small peninsula in the northern shore. The lake is shallow, with a maximum depth of 3 meters (9.8 ft) to 5 meters (16 ft). Its water is salty and hard and the bottom of the lake is muddy, having a smell of hydrogen sulfide.

The lake is fed mainly by snow and groundwater. Two rivers having their sources in the Ayr Mountains, a 23 kilometers (14 mi) long and a 10 kilometers (6.2 mi) long one, flow from the northwest into the lake. They dry up in the summer. 156 kilometers (97 mi) long river Zharly used to flow from the south into the lake, but presently its waters get lost in the ground before reaching it.

== Flora and fauna ==
Steppe vegetation grows in the area surrounding the lake. There is a narrow belt of reeds along the shoreline. There are no fish in the waters. The endangered white-headed duck and the common goldeneye are among the migratory bird species found in Saumalkol.

== See also ==
- List of lakes of Kazakhstan
