= Kyzyltu (Karkaraly District) =

Kyzyltu Қызылту
- Selo
- Qyzyltu
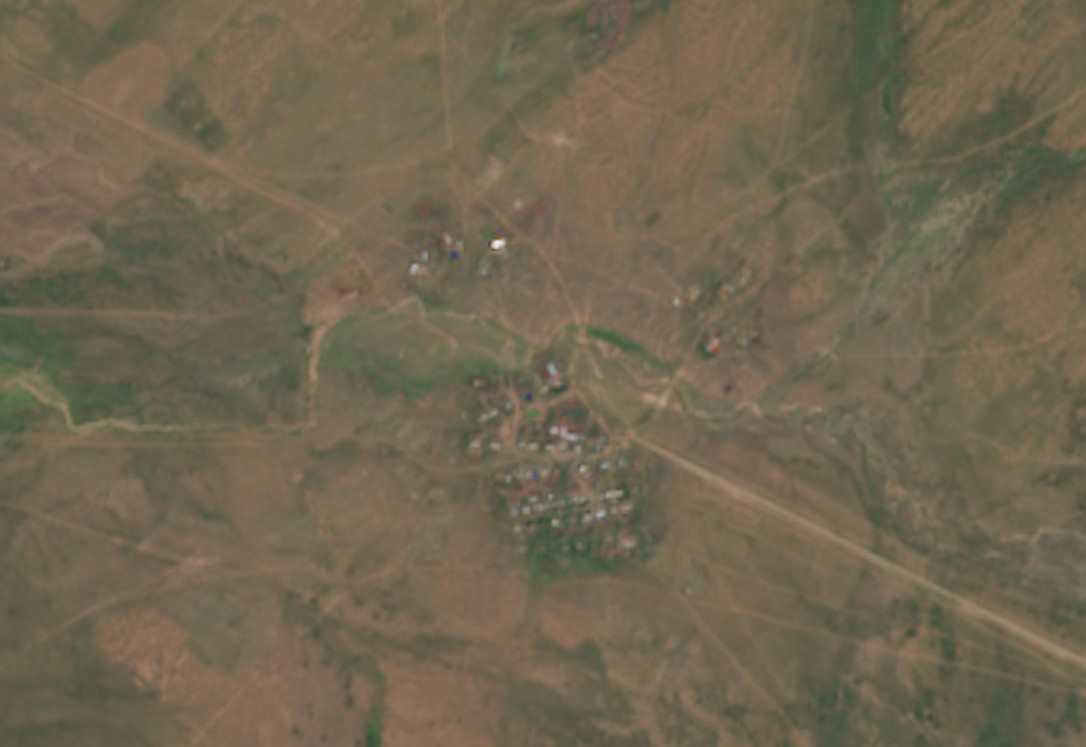
- Kyzyltu as viewed from space (Sentinel-2 L1C satellite data, modified)

- Location in Kazakhstan
- Coordinates: 49°20′48″N 74°13′55″E
- Country: Kazakhstan
- Region: Kazakhstan

Population (2009)
  - Total: 399

Kyzyltu (Kazakh: Қызылту) is a selo in the Karkaraly District of the Karaganda Region in Kazakhstan. It is a part of the Besobinskiy Rural District. Code CATO - 354847400.

== Population ==
In the year 1999, the population of the selo was 456 people (245 men and 211 women). According to the 2009 census, there were 399 people (209 men and 190 women).
