= Karkaraly (river) =

River in Kazakhstan

Karkaraly Қарқаралы
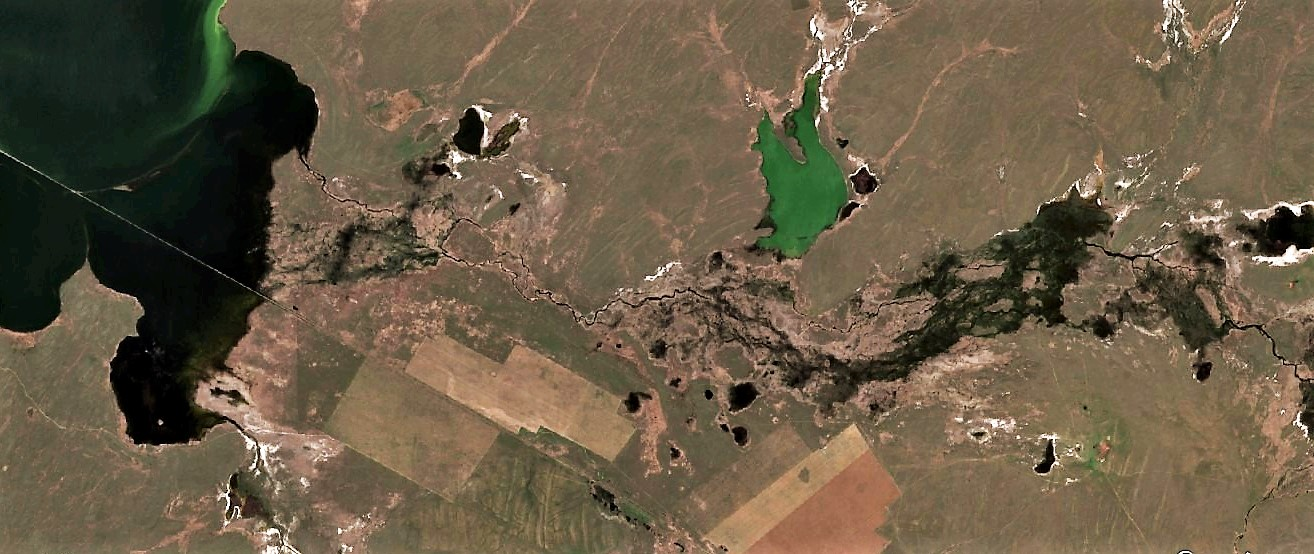
- Last stretch of the Karkaraly river and mouth in lake Karasor.

- Mouth location in Kazakhstan

Location
- Countries: Kazakhstan

Physical characteristics
- Source: Karkaraly Range; Kazakh Uplands
  - coordinates: 49°25′42″N 75°33′03″E
  - elevation: ca 900 m (3,000 ft)
- Mouth: Karasor
  - coordinates: 49°47′31″N 75°19′06″E
  - elevation: 622 meters (2,041 ft)
- Length: 63 km (39 mi)
- Basin size: 676 km^{2} (261 sq mi)
- Discharge
  - average: 0.033 m^{3}/s (1.2 cu ft/s) near Akzhol

The Karkaraly (Kazakh: Қарқаралы; Russian: Каркаралинка) is a river in Karkaraly District, Karaganda Region, Kazakhstan. It is 63 kilometres (39 mi) long and has a basin of 676 km^{2} (261 sq mi).

The Karkaraly is one of the longest rivers of the Karasor Basin. The main settlements near its banks are the city of Karkaraly and Akzhol village.

== Course ==
The Karkaraly has its sources in the southeastern slopes of the Karkaraly Range, central Kazakh Uplands. It is formed at the feet of the range in the confluence of the Big Karkaraly (Ulken Karkaraly) and Little Karkaraly (Kishi Karkaraly) rivers. It heads roughly northwards leaving the mountains to the west. A certain distance north of Akzhol it makes a wide bend heading first northwestwards and then westwards. In its lower reaches it divides into branches and flows among small lakes and clayey areas encrusted with salt. Finally the Karkaraly enters a bay located on the southern shore of lake Karasor.

The valley is wide and the river channel is steep in the upper course, becoming flat in the final stretch, where it flows among meadows and willow thickets. The Karkaraly river is fed by snow and groundwater. Usually it is at its highest level in mid April, with the melting of the snows. The Karkaraly stays frozen between November and early to mid April.

== See also ==
- List of rivers of Kazakhstan
