= Shalkarkol =

- Шалқаркөл
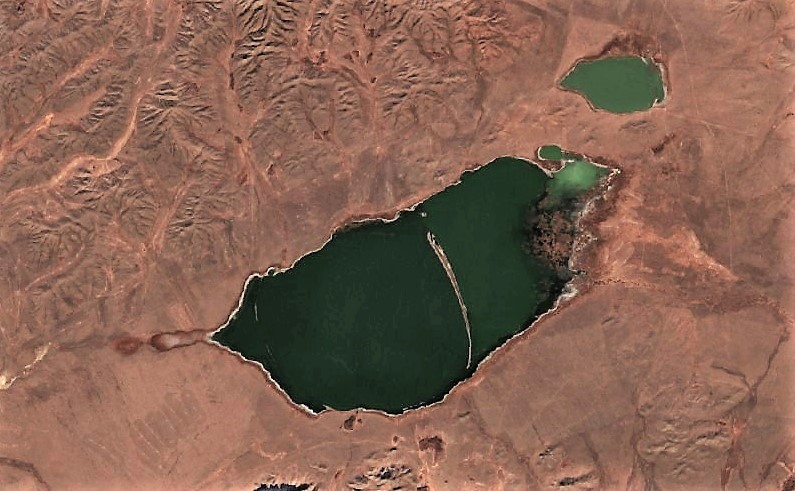
- Sentinel-2 picture of the lake

- Location within Kazakhstan
- Location: Kazakh Uplands
- Coordinates: 50°16′28″N 75°43′09″E
- Type: Salt lake
- Basin countries: Kazakhstan
- Max. length: 5 kilometers (3.1 mi)
- Max. width: 2.3 kilometers (1.4 mi)
- Surface area: 12.5 square kilometers (4.8 sq mi)
- Surface elevation: 621 meters (2,037 ft)

Shalkarkol (Kazakh: Шалқаркөл; Russian: Шалкарколь) is a salt lake in Bayanaul District, Pavlodar Region, Kazakhstan.

The lake lies about 45 kilometers (28 mi) to the southeast of Zhanatilek in a sparsely inhabited area.

== Geography ==
Shalkarkol lies in a tectonic depression of the Kazakh Uplands to the north of the Zheltau Massif. A narrow landspit in the central zone almost divides the lake in two parts. Shalkarkol is the largest of the lakes of the area. Now abandoned Zheltau village was located barely 1 kilometer (0.62 mi) to the south of the southern lakeshore.

River Tokzak, an intermittent stream, flows into the lake from the east. Smaller lake Bozshakol lies 500 meters (1,600 ft) to the northeast of the northeastern end of the lake. Shalkarkol is frozen between November and March.

== See also ==
- List of lakes of Kazakhstan
