= Kent Range =

Range of mountains in Kazakhstan

- Кент тауы
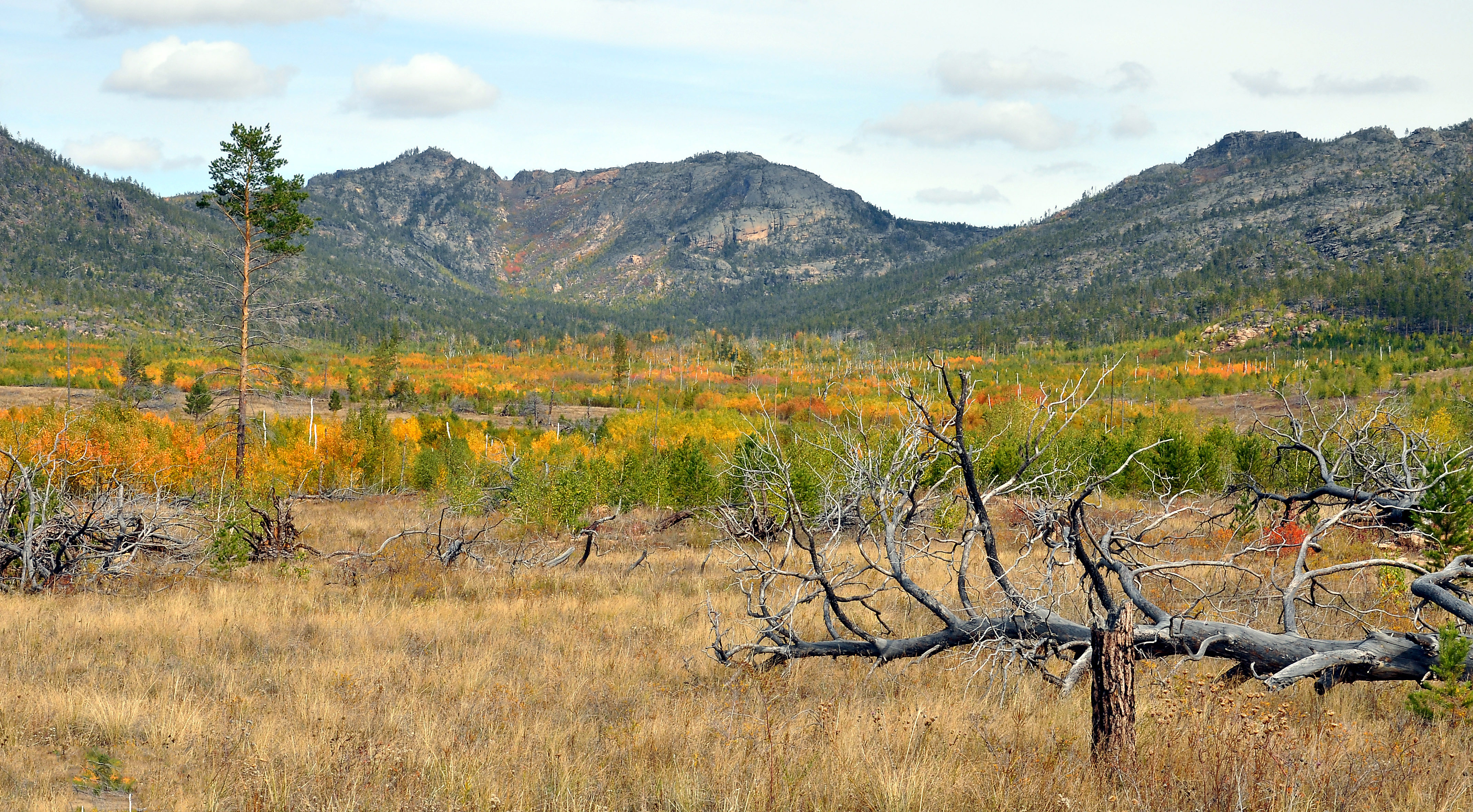
- Landscape of the range

Highest point
- Peak: Mount Kent
- Elevation: 1,469 m (4,820 ft)
- Coordinates: 49°13′28″N 76°02′22″E

Dimensions
- Length: 35 km (22 mi) N / S
- Width: 20 km (12 mi) E/ W

Geography
- Location within Kazakhstan
- Location: Kazakhstan
- Range coordinates: 49°13′N 75°02′E
- Parent range: Kazakh Uplands

Geology
- Orogeny: Alpine orogeny
- Rock age: Permian
- Rock type: Granite

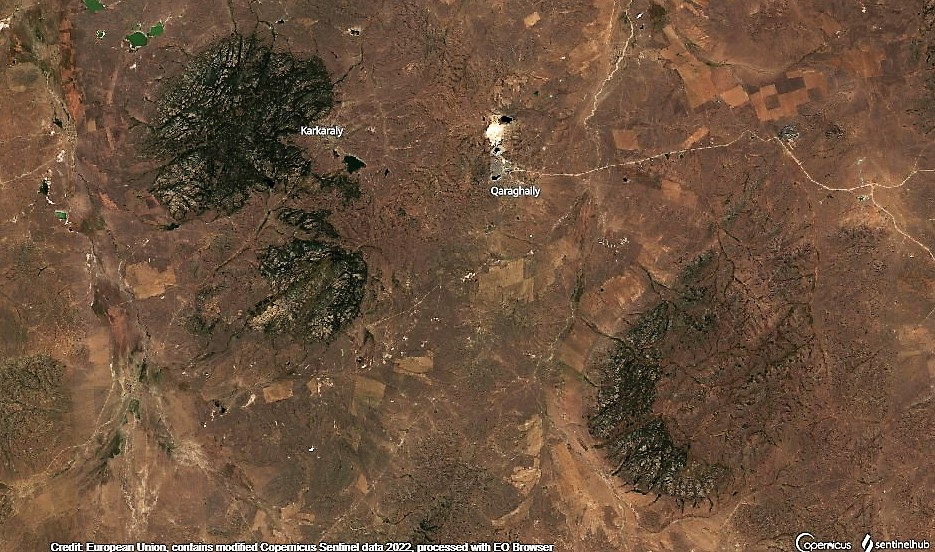
Karkaraly Range (left) and Kent Range (lower right) Sentinel-2 image

Kent Range (Kazakh: Кент тауы) is a range of mountains in Karkaraly District, Karaganda Region, Kazakhstan.

Karkaraly city lies 20 kilometers (12 mi) to the northwest of the northern slopes of the Kent Mountains. Part of the range is included in the Karkaraly National Park, a protected area established in 1998. The Kent section of the park has a surface of 40,901 hectares (101,070 acres).

== History ==
There are archaeological remains of an ancient city, dating back to the late Bronze Age in the Kent Mountains.

There are also ruins allegedly belonging to a 17th century Buddhist lamasery of the time of Buddhism in Kazakhstan, the Kyzyl Kent site. The ruins are located in a small valley surrounded by rocky slopes.

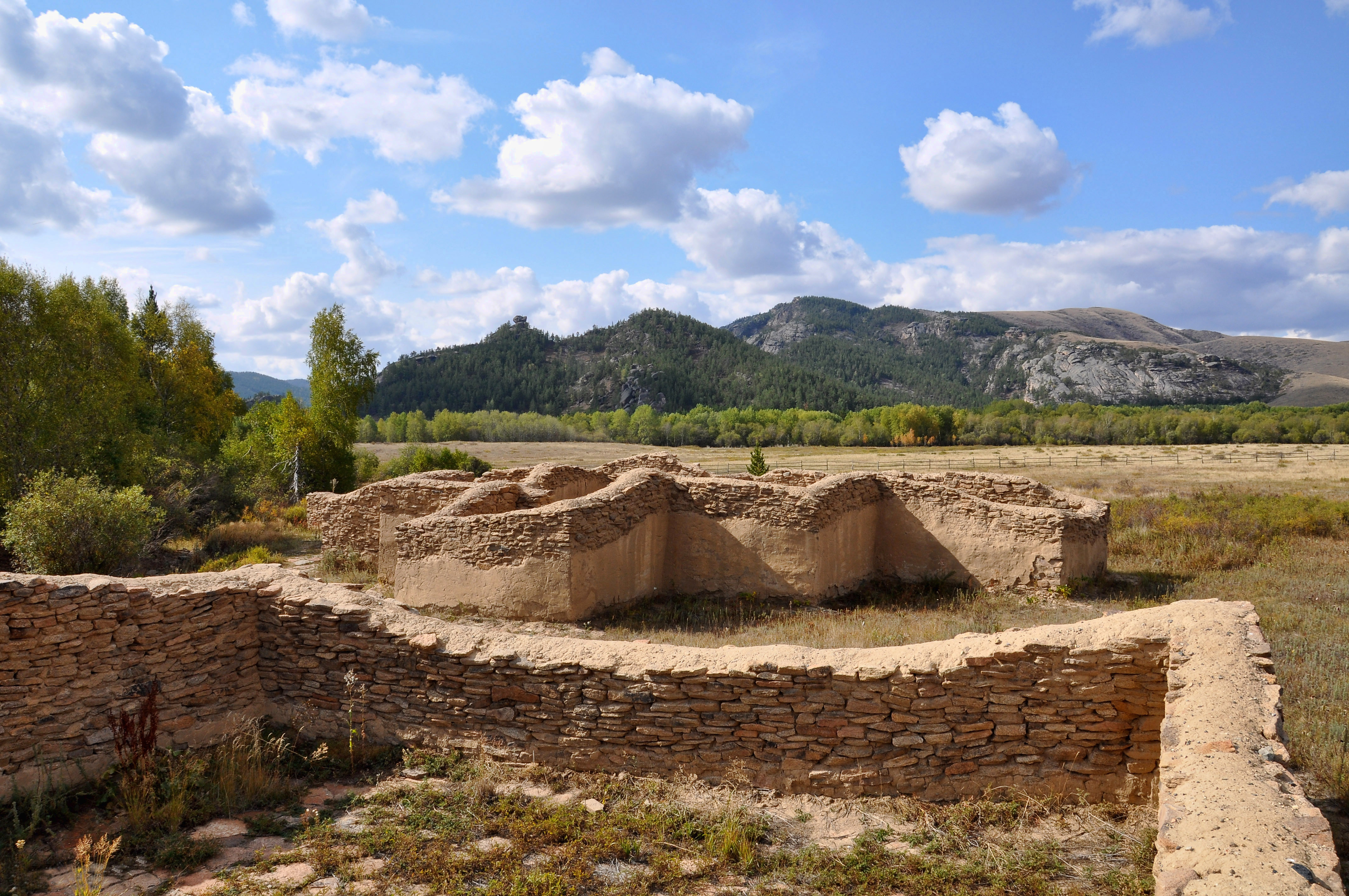
View of the Kyzyl Kent ruins.

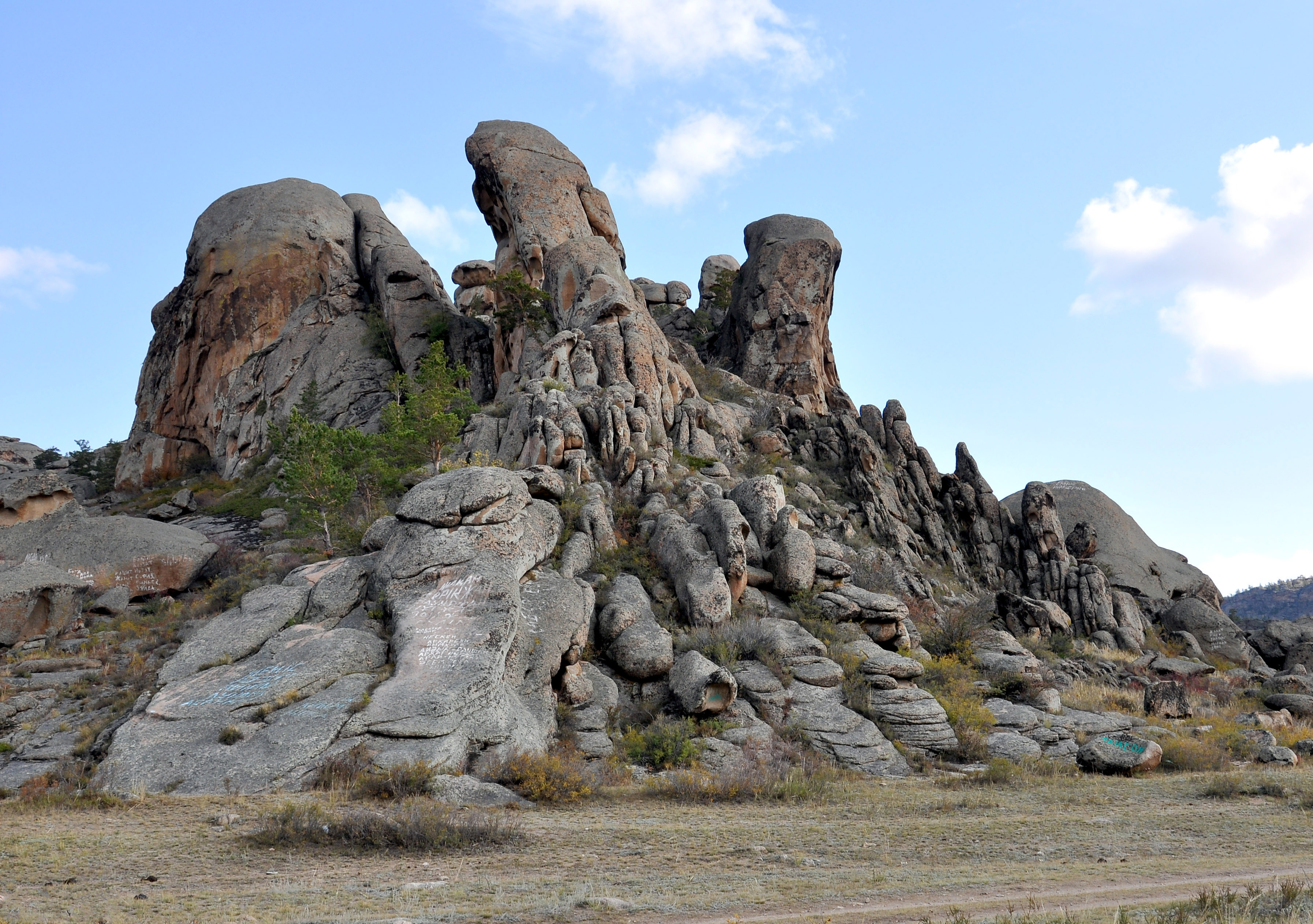
Bizarre rock formations.

== Geography ==
The Kent Range is one of the subranges of the Kazakh Upland system (Saryarka). It rises to the southeast of the Karkaraly Range. The roughly 25 kilometers (16 mi) wide intermontane basin where the Taldy river flows northwards separates both ranges. The Bakty Range rises 15 kilometers (9.3 mi) to the northeast, the Keshubai to the south, and Mount Ku 60 kilometers (37 mi) to the NNE. The range stretches roughly from north to south for about 35 kilometers (22 mi). The ridges rise between 300 meters (980 ft) and 500 meters (1,600 ft) above the surrounding steppe; they are cut by deep ravines and valleys with scree slopes. The larger Kyzyltas range rises to the southwest.

The highest point is Mount Kent, a 1,469 meters (4,820 ft) high summit. Other important peaks are Dongal (1,188 meters (3,898 ft)), Naizatas (1,293 meters (4,242 ft)), Zhamantau (1,411 meters (4,629 ft)) and Bosaga (1,066 meters (3,497 ft)). There are numerous rock formations within the area of the range.

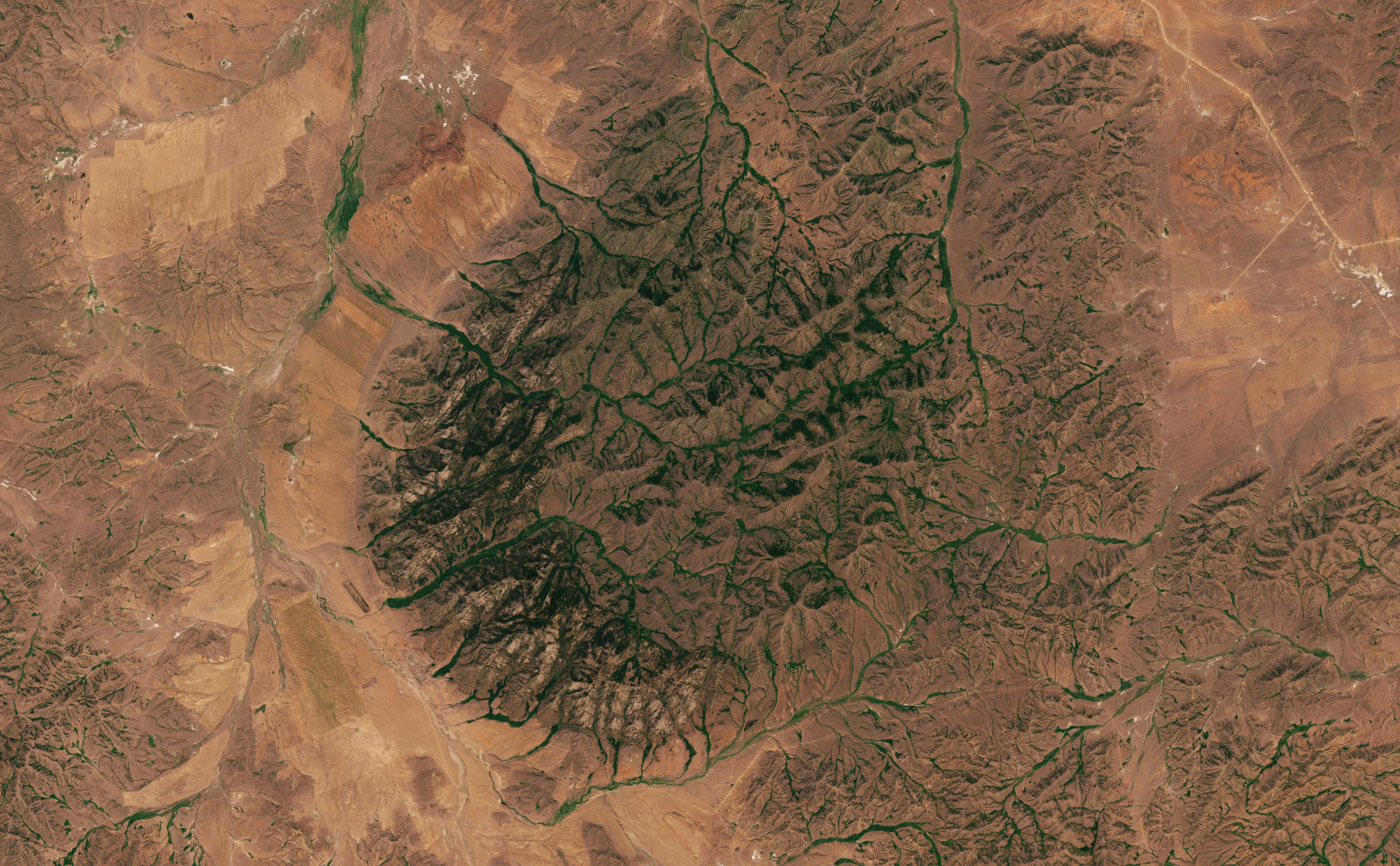
The Kent Range as seen from space (Sentinel-2 L1C data, modified)

== Flora ==
The forested areas of the range are mostly located on the western side. They include pine, birch, aspen and willow. There is as well low vegetation made up of steppe shrubs and sedges.

== See also ==
- Buddhism in Central Asia
- Geography of Kazakhstan
