= Baluan Sholak =

Turkic musician, poet, dzhigit and wrestler (1864–1919)

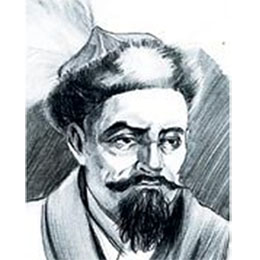
- Born: Nurmagambetov; 11 December 1864; Karaotkel, Akmola Province, Russian Empire
- Died: 1919 (aged 54–55)
- Occupations: Composer, singer, poet, dombra player, dzhigit and wrestler

Baluan Sholak (Kazakh: Балуан Шолақ, Baluan Şolaq; 1864–1919), was a Kazakh Turkic composer, singer, poet, dombra player, dzhigit and wrestler.

== Biography ==
Baluan Sholak was born on 11 December 1864, in the village of Karaotkel near the Khan mountains in modern Akmola Province, Russian Empire, and was named Nurmagambet Baymyrzauly. He was the son of a carpenter. At a young age he lost his fingers in an accident when his right hand was burnt, and became known as Baluan Sholak, "Fingerless Fighter".

He started fighting at the age of fourteen and gained a reputation as an invincible wrestler. He also gained fame as a singer of Kazakh songs, composing and performing music by Birzhan Kozhagulova and Achan Seri, and as an akyn (poet-improviser). He travelled through Kokshetau, Karaotkel, Bayan-Aul, Irtysh, and Sarysu, staging performances with his ensemble of dombra players, singers, storytellers, jockeys and wrestlers.

Some of his songs became very popular in Kazakhstan, including Галия (Galiya), dedicated to his beloved Galiya, and Сентябрь (September). He was also an accomplished dzhigit (skilful horse rider), standing on the back of a galloping horse or riding under the horse's belly.

At fairs, he could lift the weight of 816 kg. On one occasion at the Koyandy Fair he battled a well-known fighter named Karen and broke several ribs.

Baluan Sholak remained popular with his countrymen and was respected and honoured wherever he went. His songs are still heard today, and the Baluan Sholak Palace of Culture and Sports in Almaty, built in 1967 and seating 5000, is named in his honour.
