= Karasor Basin =

Plain in Kazakhstan

Karasor Basin Қарасор ойысы
- Depression
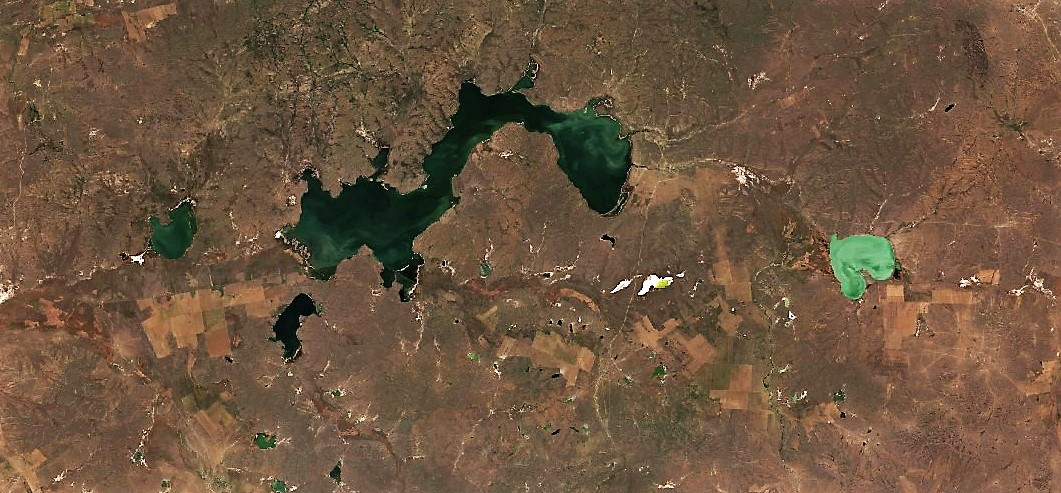
- Karasor Depression Sentinel-2 image

- Location in Kazakhstan
- Coordinates: 49.88°N 75.38°E
- Location: Karaganda Region, Kazakhstan
- Part of: Kazakh Uplands

Area
  - Total: ca 9,000 km^{2} (3,500 sq mi)

Dimensions
  - Length: ca 130 km (81 mi)
  - Width: ca 70 km (43 mi)
- Elevation: ca 620 m (2,030 ft)

The Karasor Basin (Kazakh: Қарасор ойысы; Russian: Карасорская впадина) or Karasor Depression, is a depression in Karkaraly District, Karaganda Region, Kazakhstan.

The Karasor Basin includes a 37,286 hectares (92,140 acres) Important Bird Area.

== Geography ==
The Karasor Depression is an endorheic basin in the Kazakh Uplands. It extends roughly from east to west for a length of approximately 130 km (81 mi) to the southeast of the Ayr and Zheltau ranges, and north of the Karkaraly Range and the Kyzyltas. Fourteen rivers flow into the basin, the largest of which are the 159 kilometers (99 mi) long Taldy and the 156 kilometers (97 mi) long Zharly. The Karasor Basin is covered in snow approximately between October and April every year. Most rivers and rivulets flow only following the melting of the snows, breaking up into disconnected pools or drying out completely during the summer.

Karasor, the largest lake, lies in a central position at the bottom of the depression. There are three other major lakes in the basin, Saumalkol, Katynkol and Balyktykol, as well as numerous smaller lakes and sors. The water of all the lakes is saline; Saumalkol in the west is a dead lake, having the highest salt concentration, while Balyktykol has the lowest. The salinity of Karasor and Taldykol exceeds the values of average sea water. Parts of the depressions between the surrounding hills are occupied by salt pans.

=== Ancient lake ===
Karasor was a much larger lake in the past. There are traces of high water levels reaching 640 m (2,100 ft) in the banks of Karasor and adjacent Saumalkol and Katynkol lakes, indicating that the former extension of lake Karasor reached 740 km^{2} (290 sq mi) —about five times larger, with a depth between 22 m (72 ft) and 25 m (82 ft) —almost five times deeper. At that time the water of river Nura reached the ancient lake from the west.

== Flora and fauna ==
The landscape of the basin area is hilly steppe,. There are plowed agricultural fields with clayey and loamy soils. The vegetation in the basin includes spear grass, wormwood, Siberian peashrub, Neotrinia splendens and fescue.

== See also ==
- Geology of Kazakhstan
- Sor
