= Karagayly, Beloretsky District, Republic of Bashkortostan =

Karagayly Карагайлы
- Village
- Location within Bashkortostan Location within Russia
- Coordinates: 53°59′N 58°34′E
- Country: Russia
- Region: Bashkortostan
- District: Beloretsky District
- Time zone: UTC+5:00

Karagayly (Russian: Карагайлы; Bashkir: Ҡарағайлы, Qarağaylı) is a rural locality (a village) in Abzakovsky Selsoviet, Beloretsky District, Bashkortostan, Russia. The population was 4 as of 2010. There are 2 streets.

== Geography ==
Karagayly is located 13 km east of Beloretsk (the district's administrative centre) by road. Uraltau is the nearest rural locality.
