= Karkaraly Range =

Mountain range in Kazakhstan

- Қарқаралы таулары
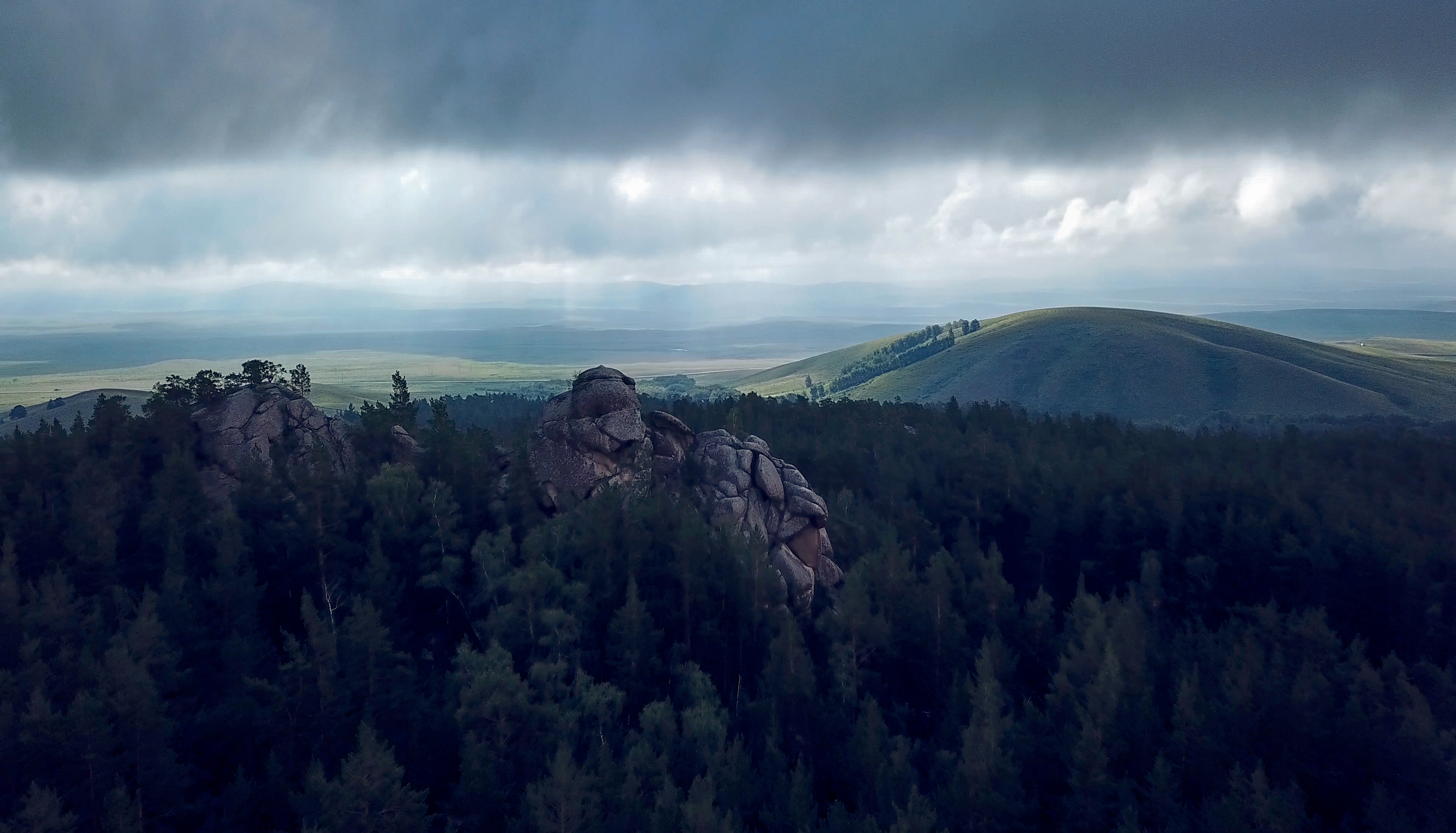
- Landscape of the range

Highest point
- Peak: Zhirensakal (Komsomol Peak)
- Elevation: 1,403 m (4,603 ft)
- Coordinates: 49°22′N 75°23′E

Dimensions
- Length: 35 km (22 mi) N / S
- Width: 25 km (16 mi) E/ W

Geography
- Location within Kazakhstan
- Location: Kazakhstan
- Range coordinates: 49°22′N 75°22′E
- Parent range: Kazakh Uplands

Geology
- Orogeny: Alpine orogeny
- Rock type(s): Granite, quartzite, porphyritic rock

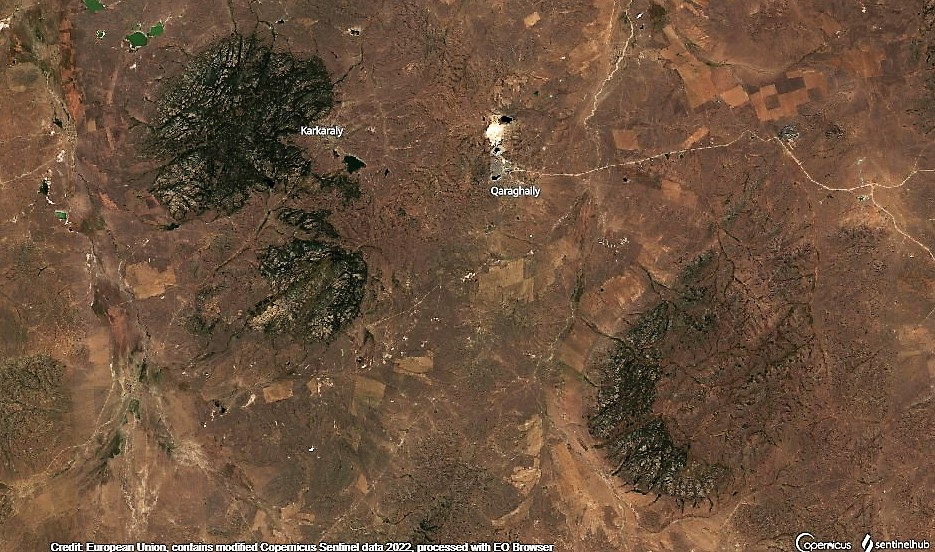
Karkaraly Range (left) and Kent Range (lower right) Sentinel-2 image

Karkaraly Range (Kazakh: Қарқаралы таулары; Russian: Каркаралинские горы) is a range of mountains in Karkaraly District, Karaganda Region, Kazakhstan.

The name Karkaraly means "arrow-headed" in the Kazakh language Karkaraly city lies at the feet of the eastern slopes of the mountains and Karagaily village, a little further east. A large sector of the range is part of the Karkaraly National Park, a 112,120 hectares (277,100 acres) protected area established in 1998.

== Geography ==
The Karkaraly Range is one of the subranges of the Kazakh Upland system (Saryarka). It rises to the northwest of the smaller, but higher, Kent Range, marking the southern limit the Karasor Basin. The larger Kyzyltas range rises to the southwest. The Karkaraly Range stretches from north to south for about 40 kilometers (25 mi). Its highest point is Zhirensakal (Komsomol Peak), a 1,403 meters (4,603 ft) high summit. The mountains are deeply dissected by valleys and ravines. There are numerous small lakes, such as Pasheno and Shaytankol within the range, as well as Bolshoye, Zhartas and Ashchykol at the feet of the mountains.

The main rivers having their sources in the range are the Karkaraly, flowing into lake Karasor, as well as the Sarsu and Tundak. The Taldy flows northwards, its valley forming the eastern limit of the range.

== Flora ==
The range is covered by pine forests as well as highland steppe vegetation made up of coarse feathergrass and forb grassland areas.

== See also ==
- Geography of Kazakhstan
