= Karagaily =

Karagaily Қарағайлы
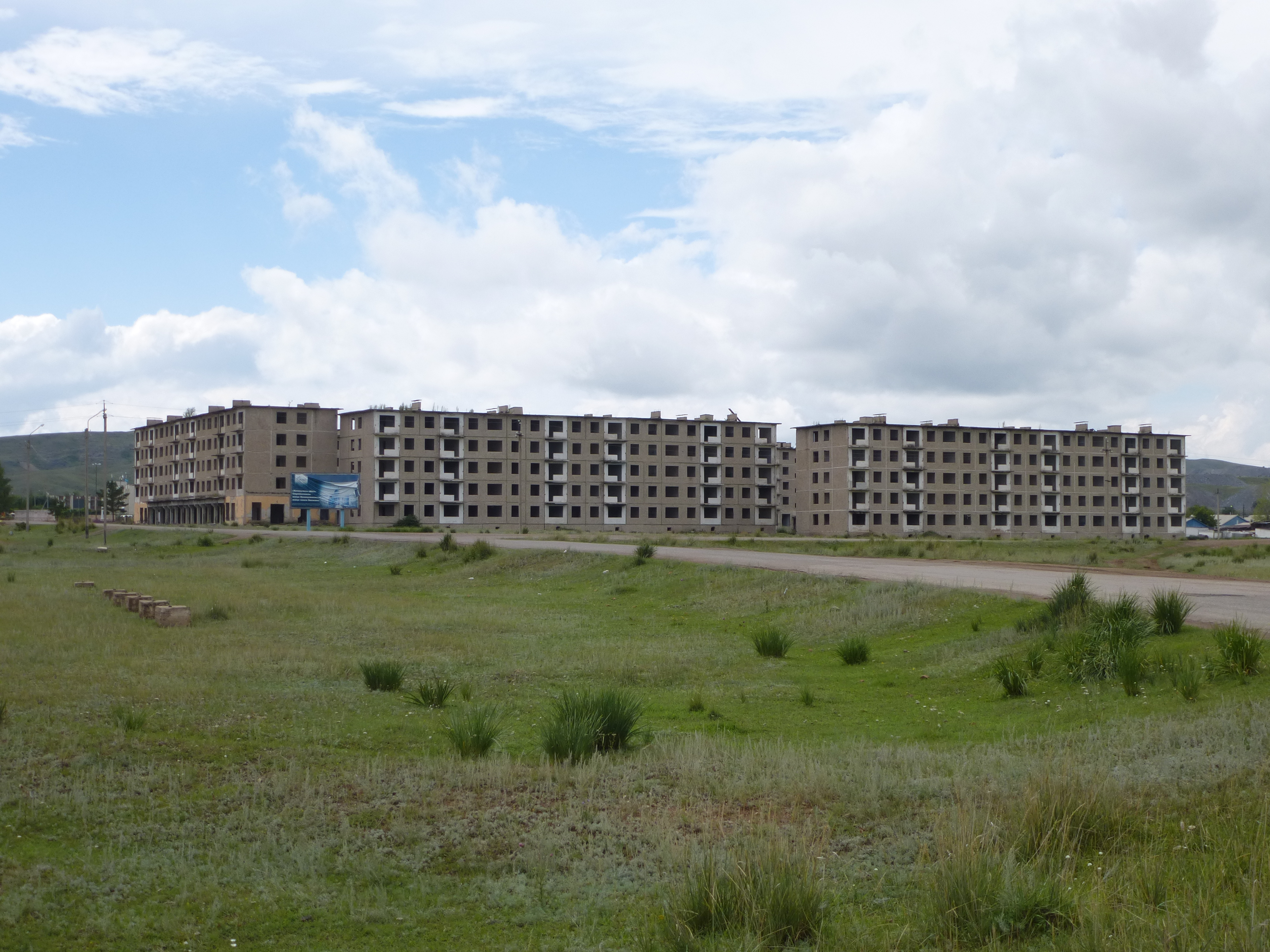
- Abandoned houses built at the time of the Kazakh SSR in Karagaily.

- Location in Kazakhstan
- Coordinates: 49°21′30″N 75°43′59″E
- Country: Kazakhstan
- Region: Karaganda Region
- District: Karkaraly District

Population (2009)
  - Total: 4,850
- Time zone: UTC+6
- Postcode: 100814

Karagaily (Kazakh: Қарағайлы) is a settlement in Karkaraly District, Karaganda Region, Kazakhstan. It is the administrative center of the Karagaily Municipal Administration (KATO code - 354863100). Population: 4,850 (2009 census results); 6,188 (1999 census results).

== History ==
The village of Karagaily was founded in 1952. In 1954 it received the status of an urban-type settlement. In 1977-1988 - the center of the now abolished Taldy District.

== Geography ==
Karagaily lies in the valley of the Taldy river, 5 kilometers (3.1 mi) to the west of its banks. It is located 17 kilometers (11 mi) to the northeast of the district capital Karkaraly.

Karagaily is a mining town and was the head of the now abolished Taldy District.
