= Karagayly =

- Village
- Location in Kazakhstan
- Coordinates: 43°10′00″N 76°50′59″E
- Country: Kazakhstan
- Region: Almaty Region
- Time zone: UTC+6 (Omsk Time)

Karagayly is a village in Almaty Region, in south-eastern Kazakhstan.
