= Taldy =

River in Karkaraly District, Kazakhstan

Taldy Талды
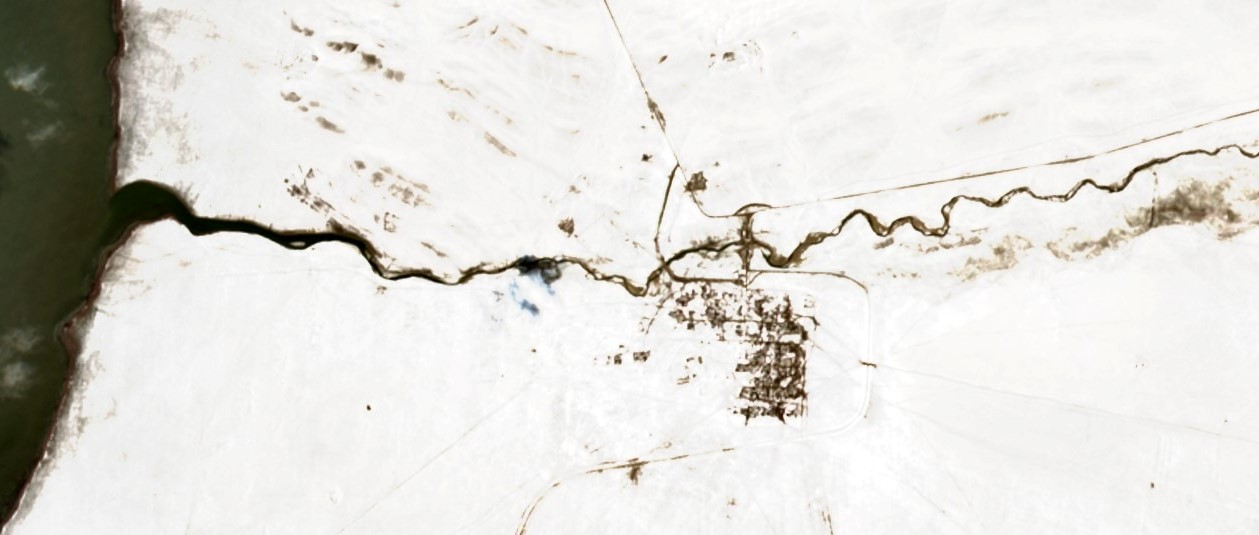
- Last stretch of the Taldy by Koyandy village and mouth in lake Karasor.

- Mouth location in Kazakhstan

Location
- Countries: Kazakhstan

Physical characteristics
- Source: Kent Range; Kazakh Uplands
- Mouth: Karasor
  - coordinates: 49°52′37″N 75°37′18″E
  - elevation: 622 meters (2,041 ft)
- Length: 159 km (99 mi)

The Taldy (Kazakh: Талды) is a river in Karkaraly District, Karaganda Region, Kazakhstan. It is 159 kilometres (99 mi) long.

The Taldy is the main river of the Karasor Basin. It freezes between November and April. The main settlements near its banks are Koyandy, Burkitti (Taldinka), Karagaily and Akkora.

Archaeologists uncovered a burial ground called "Taldy-2" in the Karkaralinsk district (near the Taldy river) which contained around 200 gold artifacts.

== Course ==
The Taldy has its sources in the Kent Range, to the SSE of the southern slopes of the Karkaraly Range, central Kazakh Uplands. It heads roughly northwards along a wide intermontane basin bound by mountains all along its course. Its main tributary is the Sarybulak from the right. Near Balyktykol lake it bends westwards close to the northwestern lakeshore and heads straight towards lake Karasor, flowing roughly parallel to the Karasu to the north. Finally it enters the eastern end of the lake 4 km (2.5 mi) downriver from Koyandy village.

The valley is wide and the river channel is steep in some stretches. The river is fed by precipitation and groundwater.

== See also ==
- List of rivers of Kazakhstan
