= Aleksandr Zatayevich =

Russian composer

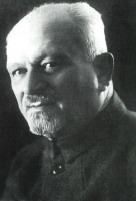
Zatayevich

Aleksandr Viktorovich Zatayevich (Russian: Алекса́ндр Ви́кторович Затае́вич; 20 March 1869 [O.S. 8 March] – 6 December 1936) was a Russian music ethnographer and exponent of Central Asian folk music.

== Life ==
Zatayevich was born on 20 March 1869 in Oryol. He graduated from the Oryol military gymnasium in 1886. He was largely self-taught in music theory. He lived in Warsaw, Moscow, and Saint Petersburg, then finally settled in Orenburg in 1920, where he began his most significant work. He worked as an ethnographer, collector, researcher on Kazakh folk music, and recorded about 3,000 instrumental melodies. He contributed to the Warsaw Diary which published music critiques and analyses. He wrote over 2,300 pieces of Kazakh folk music, of which 1,500 were published in two volumes during his life. He was the first to create a categorization system for Kazakh music, including genres such as historic, comedic, and legendary. He died on 6 December 1936 in Moscow.

In 1896, he was the dedicatee of Sergei Rachmaninoff's Six moments musicaux.

== Bibliography ==
- —. 1000 songs of Kyrgyz/Kazakh people: tunes and melodies. Orenburg, 1925.
- —. 500 songs and kyuis of Aday, Bukey, Semipalatinsk, and the Ural Kazakhs. Alma-Ata, 1931.
