= Karasor =

Lake in Kazakhstan

- Қарасор
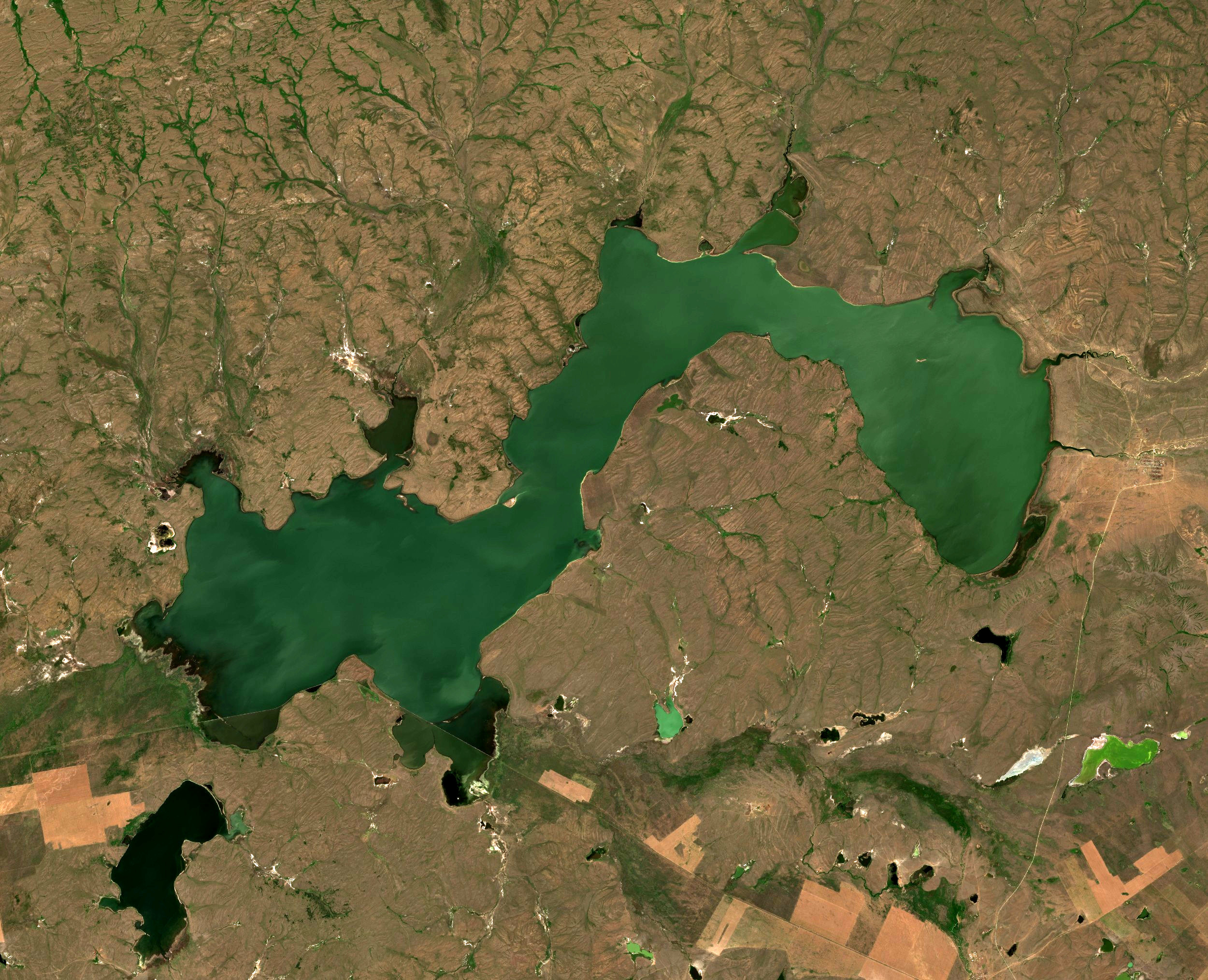
- Sentinel-2 image of the lake in June 2021

- Location within Kazakhstan
- Location: Kazakh Uplands
- Coordinates: 49°53′N 75°23′E
- Type: endorheic
- Primary inflows: Taldy, Karasu, Yesenaman, Barak and Kemer
- Primary outflows: none
- Catchment area: 8,750 square kilometers (3,380 sq mi)
- Basin countries: Kazakhstan
- Max. length: 43 kilometers (27 mi)
- Max. width: 7.3 kilometers (4.5 mi)
- Surface area: 154 square kilometers (59 sq mi)
- Average depth: 2.5 meters (8 ft 2 in)
- Max. depth: 5 meters (16 ft)
- Water volume: 160,000,000 cubic meters (5.7×10^{9} cu ft)
- Residence time: UTC+6
- Shore length^{1}: 103 kilometers (64 mi)
- Surface elevation: 622 meters (2,041 ft)
- Islands: Zhumyrtkaly and Araltabe
- ^{1} Shore length is not a well-defined measure.

Karasor (Kazakh: Қарасор; Russian: Карасор), is a salt lake in Karkaraly District, Karaganda Region, Kazakhstan.

Karasor is the largest lake in Karaganda Region. It is located 45 kilometers (28 mi) to the north of Karkaraly city. There are no settlements by the lakeshore. The nearest inhabited place is Koyandy village, close to the eastern end. The mud at the bottom of the lake has medicinal properties.

== Geography ==
Karasor is an endorheic lake in the central Kazakh Uplands. It stretches from east to west to the north of the Karkaraly Range and to the south of the Ayr Mountains. It is the largest of the lakes of the Karasor Basin, and is located at the bottom of the vast depression without drainage. Smaller lake Katynkol lies to the SW of the southern end, Saumalkol to the west, and Balyktykol 20 kilometers (12 mi) to the east. The shape of Karasor is sinuous, narrower in its central section. The bottom of the lake is mostly silt, with a smell of hydrogen sulfide. The lakeshores are complex, some stretches are clayey or pebbly, low and gently sloping, but in certain areas they are rocky, with cliffs reaching a height of 25 meters (82 ft). There are two little islands on the lake, Zhumyrtkaly and Araltabe.

Fourteen small rivers flow into Karasor, including the 159 kilometers (99 mi) long Taldy, which flows into the eastern end of the lake. Other rivers are the Karkaralinka, Karsakpai, Karasu, Yesenaman, Barak and Kemer. Most of them dry up in the summer. On average, the highest water level of the lake is in April and the lowest in November. Karasor usually freezes over in November and thaws in late April or early May.

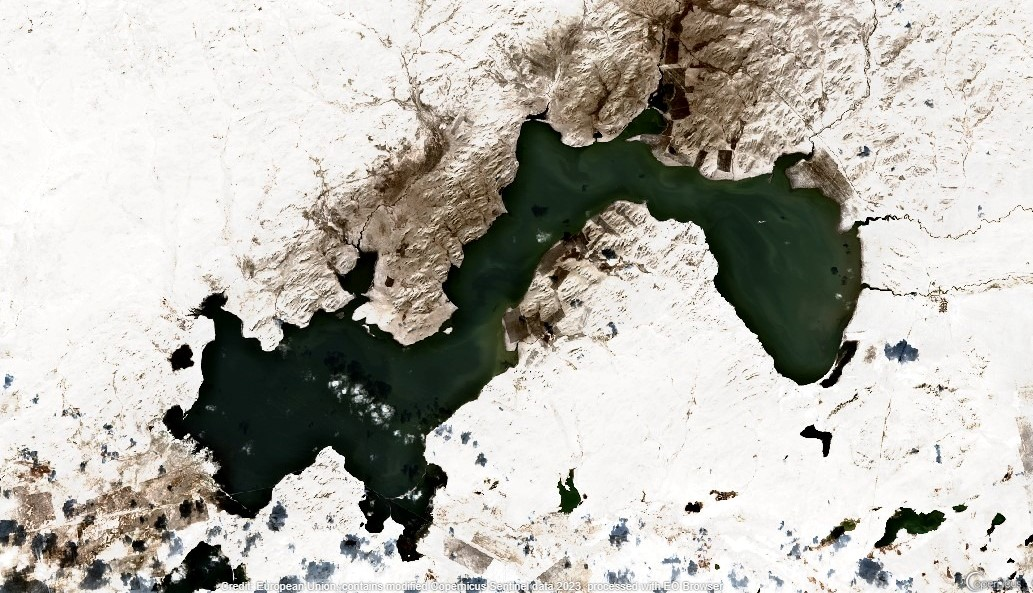
Sentinel-2 image of the lake in October.

== Flora and fauna ==
The land in the 8,750 square kilometers (3,380 sq mi) basin around Karasor includes plowed agricultural fields with clay and loam soils. The vegetation near the lakeshore zone is characteristic of the Kazakh steppe, including the spear grass, wormwood, Siberian peashrub and fescue.

Although the lake water is highly mineralized, with a concentration of 250 grams per liter (40 oz/imp gal) to 350 grams per liter (56 oz/imp gal), there are fish living in the lake. Every year at Karasor there is a large concentration of about 5,000 common shelducks during their moulting season.

== See also ==
- List of lakes of Kazakhstan
