= 2009 population census of Kazakhstan =

The 2009 population census of Kazakhstan was the second population census in Kazakhstan after it gained sovereignty. It was conducted on February 24–25. Preliminary official results of the census were published on February 4, 2010, on the website of the Bureau of National Statistics of the Republic of Kazakhstan. According to the 2009 census, the population of the Republic of Kazakhstan was 16,004.8 thousand people, an increase of 1,022.9 thousand (6.8%) compared to the 1999 census. One of the most unexpected results of the census was a slight decrease in the share of the urban population from 56.3% to 54.0% and the determination of the level of agricultural development.

== National composition ==
The census recorded a trend towards an increase in the number of residents of Kazakhstan, which replaced a period of decline. This is explained by a decrease in the emigration of European ethnic groups, an increase in the growth rate of the number of Kazakhs (from +22.9% in 1989-1999 to +26.2% for 1999-2009), including due to the influx of Kazakh repatriates (Oralmans), as well as a decrease in the rate of decline of Russians (-15.3% for the period between 1999-2009) and Germans (-49.6%). The most numerous nationalities are, as before, Kazakhs (10.1 million) and Russians (3.8 million).

The share of Kazakhs in the country's population is 63.1% (53.4% in 1999), Russians - 23.7% (30.0%), Uzbeks - 2.8% (2.5%), Ukrainians - 2.1% (3.6%), Uyghurs - 1.4% (1.4%), Tatars - 1.3% (1.7%), Germans - 1.1% (2.4%), other ethnic groups - 4.5% (5.0%). As a result of the uneven dynamics of natural movement, as well as the size and direction of migration among different ethnic groups, Ukrainians yielded 3rd place to Uzbeks, and Germans - to Tatars and Uyghurs.

National composition of Kazakhstan according to current statistics (as of 1.01.2009) and preliminary census data (25.02.2009)
| People | Estimate on 1.01.2009 | % | census 25.02.2009 | % | Estimate as of 01.01.2010 excluding preliminary results of the 2009 census. | % | Estimate as of 01.01.2010 taking into account preliminary results of the 2009 census. | % | Correction of the absolute number as a result of recalculation based on preliminary results of the 2009 census. |
|---|---|---|---|---|---|---|---|---|---|
| Total | 15 776 492 | 100,00 | 16 004 800 | 100,0 | 16 036 075 | 100,0 | 16 197 000 | 100,0 | + 1,0 % |
| Kazakhs | 9 540 806 | 60,47 | 10 098 600 | 63,10 | 9 801 501 | 61,12 | 10 301 000 | 63,6 | + 5,1 % |
| Russians | 3 869 661 | 24,53 | 3 797 000 | 23,72 | 3 848 246 | 24,00 | 3 774 000 | 23,3 | 1,9 % |
| Uzbeks | 463 381 | 2,94 | 457 200 | 2,86 | 475 354 | 2,96 | 470 000 | 2,9 | 1,1 % |
| Ukrainians | 422 680 | 2,68 | 333 200 | 2,08 | 415 539 | 2,60 | 324 000 | 2,0 | 22,0 % |
| Uyghurs | 241 946 | 1,53 | 223 100 | 1,39 | 246 449 | 1,54 | 227 000 | 1,4 | 7,9 % |
| Tatars | 226 803 | 1,44 | 203 300 | 1,27 | 226514 | 1,41 | 194 000 | 1,2 | 14,4 % |
| Germans | 220 975 | 1,40 | 178 200 | 1,11 | 221 833 | 1,38 | 178 000 | 1,1 | 19,8 % |
| Others | 790 240 | 5,01 | 714 200 | 4,46 | 800 639 | 4,99 | 729 000 | 4,5 | — 8,9 % |

A significant (by 14-22%) decrease in the number of a number of nationalities (characterized in the context of Kazakhstan as "European") according to the census data in comparison with the data of the current statistical accounting can be interpreted either as a mass departure abroad, which was not recorded by the registration authorities, or a sharp increase in mortality among these nationalities, which was also not previously taken into account by the registration authorities, or, most likely, a change in national identification. The direction of such a change in identification is indicated by the fact that of all the "European" ethnic groups, only Russians showed a moderate correction in numbers according to the census results (-2%), which could have been influenced by the fact that a significant proportion of citizens of a number of "European" nationalities (Ukrainians, Tatars, Germans) could have been counted as Russians in the census.

In some ways, similar processes could be observed in relation to the so-called “Asian” nationalities (Uzbeks and Uyghurs), only in this case, during the census, a certain portion of citizens of these nationalities could already be counted as Kazakhs.

== Religious composition ==
Kazakhstan became the first state of the former USSR, not counting the Baltic states, to include a question on religion in the census. The population was offered to choose from the following positions: Islam, Christianity, Judaism, Buddhism, Refuse to specify, Non-believer.

Religious affiliation of the population of Kazakhstan (preliminary results of the 2009 census)
| Respondents' answers on attitudes towards religion | Absolute number (thousands) | Share in population % |
|---|---|---|
| Muslims | 11 237,9 | 70,19 |
| Christians | 4 190,1 | 26,17 |
| Judaism | 5,3 | 0,03 |
| Buddhism | 14,6 | 0,09 |
| Other religions | 30,1 | 0,19 |
| Non-believer | 450,5 | 2,81 |
| Did not provide an answer | 81,0 | 0,51 |
| Всего | 16 009,6 | 100,00 |

Religious affiliation of ethnic groups in Kazakhstan (preliminary results of the 2009 census)
| Ethnic group | Islam | Christianity | Judaism | Buddhism | Other | Non-believer | Refused to provide an answer | Total |
|---|---|---|---|---|---|---|---|---|
| Kazakhs | 9928705 | 39172 | 1929 | 749 | 1612 | 98511 | 26085 | 10096763 |
| Russians | 54277 | 3476748 | 1452 | 730 | 1011 | 230935 | 28611 | 3793764 |
| Uzbeks | 452668 | 1794 | 34 | 28 | 78 | 1673 | 722 | 456997 |
| Ukrainians | 3134 | 302199 | 108 | 49 | 74 | 24329 | 3138 | 333031 |
| Uyghurs | 221007 | 1142 | 34 | 33 | 63 | 1377 | 1057 | 224713 |
| Tatars | 162496 | 20913 | 47 | 58 | 123 | 16569 | 4023 | 204229 |
| Germans | 2827 | 145556 | 89 | 66 | 192 | 24905 | 4774 | 178409 |
| Koreans | 5256 | 49543 | 211 | 11446 | 138 | 28615 | 5176 | 100385 |
| Turkish | 96172 | 290 | 7 | 6 | 20 | 321 | 199 | 97015 |
| Azerbaijanis | 80864 | 2139 | 16 | 16 | 24 | 1586 | 647 | 85292 |
| Belarusians | 526 | 59936 | 25 | 9 | 20 | 5198 | 762 | 66476 |
| Dungan | 51388 | 191 | 4 | 15 | 19 | 179 | 148 | 51944 |
| Kurds | 37667 | 203 | 11 | 6 | 9 | 285 | 144 | 38325 |
| Tajiks | 35473 | 331 | 2 | 6 | 30 | 307 | 128 | 36277 |
| Poles | 235 | 30675 | 14 | 4 | 45 | 2486 | 598 | 34057 |
| Chechens | 29448 | 940 | 6 | 3 | 16 | 653 | 365 | 31431 |
| Kyrgyz | 22500 | 206 | 6 | 6 | 4 | 352 | 200 | 23274 |
| Other nationalities | 54533 | 82254 | 1286 | 1433 | 210 | 13266 | 4233 | 157215 |
| Всего: | 11239176 | 4214232 | 5281 | 14663 | 3688 | 451547 | 81010 | 16009597 |

== Corruption and distortion ==
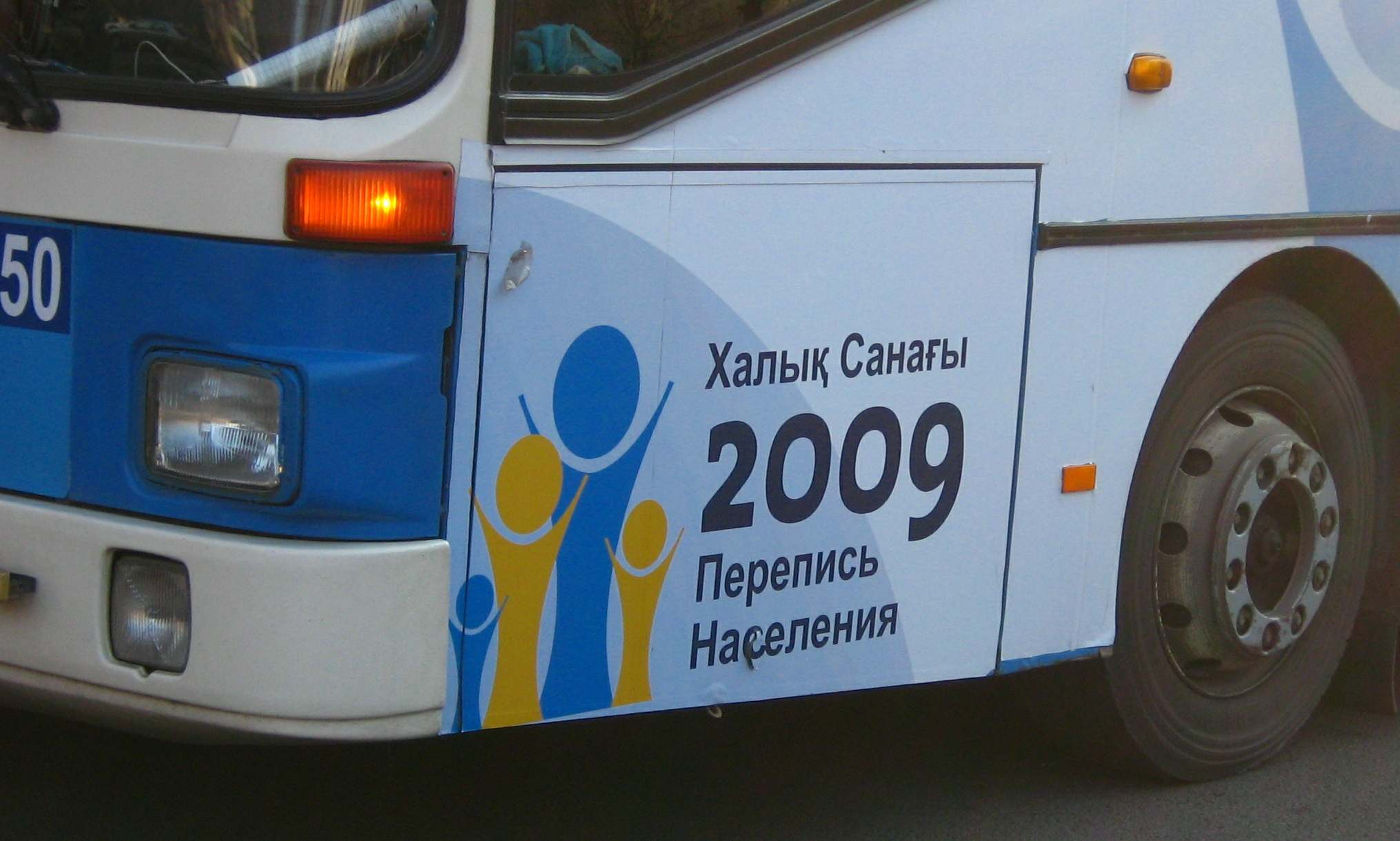
A city bus with symbols of the 2009 population census of Kazakhstan in Almaty

1.144 billion tenge were allocated for the population census, of which only 379 million tenge (33% of the total amount) was used directly for the intended purpose; the remaining funds were embezzled by agency officials and heads of private enterprises. The head of the Kazakh statistics agency, Anar Meshimbayeva, was removed from her post, accused of embezzling funds from the population census budget, fled, and was put on the wanted list. She was extradited from Russia, sentenced to 7 years in prison, but served only 4 years. Her deputies Nurman Bayanov and Birlik Mendybayev, as well as the well-known Kazakh businessman Serik Turzhanov were also arrested and accused of embezzlement.

The first preliminary results of the census were announced in April 2009 by the head of the government of Kazakhstan Karim Massimov, with the population being 16 million 304 thousand 840, and the share of Kazakhs in the country's population being 67% (which gave about 10.9 million people). On September 1, 2009, the former President of Kazakhstan Nazarbayev in his address to the people of the country announced a new estimate of the share of Kazakhs - 65% (which gave about 10.7 million people).

Preliminary results of the census became known only on February 4, 2010, after Nazarbayev’s sharp demand to publish at least preliminary results. According to these results, the total population of the country was 16,004.8 thousand people (that is, exactly 300 thousand less than previously announced), and the share of Kazakhs in the entire population was 63.1% (or 10.1 million people).

The processing of the 2009 census materials is being delayed due to the lack of funding for these works. Thus, according to the Chairman of the Agency of the Republic of Kazakhstan on Statistics Alikhan Smailov:

"The most important issue that has not yet been resolved is the issue of financing the processing of census data this year. Only 19 million tenge have been allocated for replication, for printing services, for replication of statistical collections. At the same time, we have no money allocated for processing the data and obtaining the output tables themselves, which must then be replicated"

Makash Tatimov, demographer and rector of the University of Central Asia, critically assesses the quality of the 2009 census:

... I know that the population census was conducted with violations of the UN instructions, due to which it lost its scientific value and suitability for scientific analysis. Understand that when a counter enters information out of thin air into a questionnaire, and not the data of a real person surveyed, there can be no talk of any objectivity. And such facts were in the past census. Consequently, for demography specialists, the census campaign conducted in such a way may be interesting from the point of view of the volume of falsifications. It will not be difficult for me to prove that, perhaps, we received a distorted mirror, and not a real reflection of Kazakhstani society...
