= Karkaraly =

Settlement in Karaganda Region, Kazakhstan

Karkaraly Қарқаралы
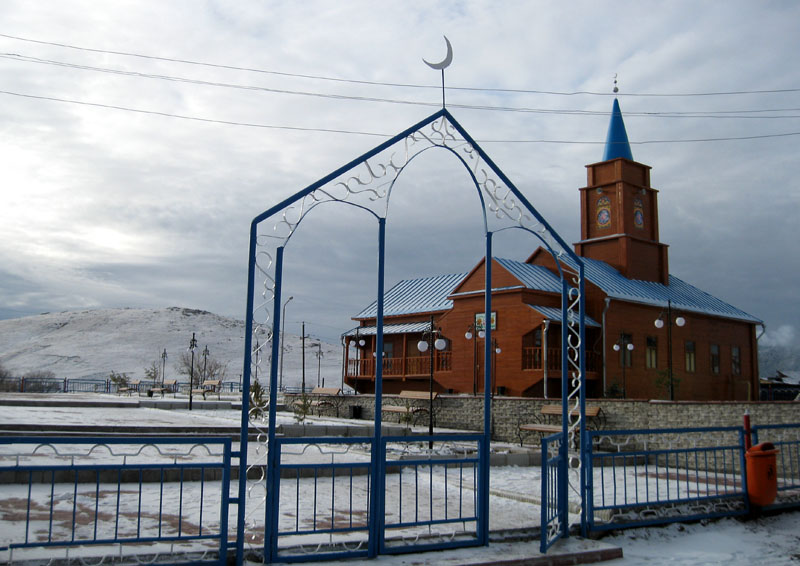
- Kunanbaev mosque

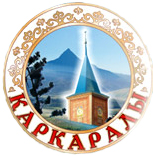
- Seal

- Location in Kazakhstan
- Coordinates: 49°24′46″N 75°28′37″E
- Country: Kazakhstan
- Region: Karaganda Region
- District: Karkaraly District
- Settled: 1824
- Incorporated: 1868

Population (2009)
  - Total: 9,212
- Time zone: UTC+6
- Postal code: 100800
- Area code: +8 (72146)
- Website: http://karkaraly.kz/

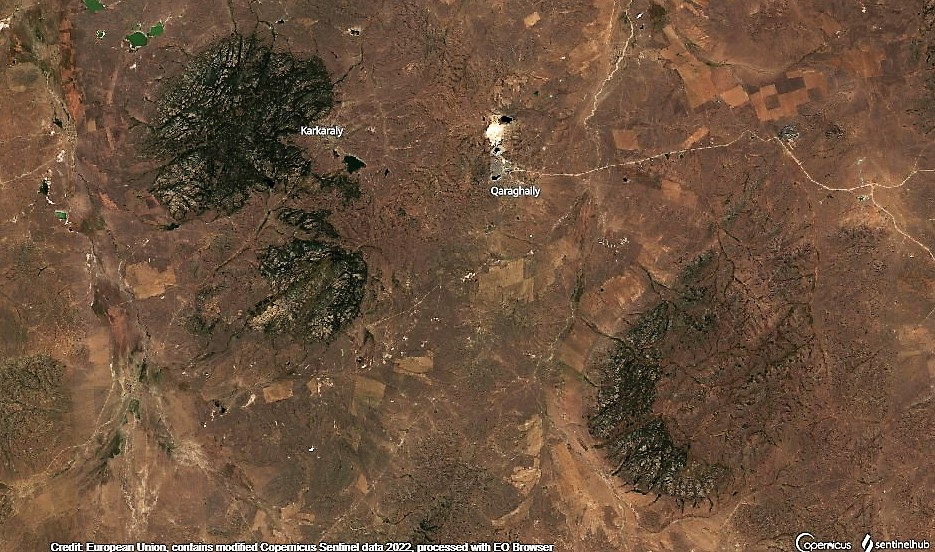
Taldy river basin and Karkaraly Range with Karkaraly city (left) and Kent Range (lower right) Sentinel-2 image.

Karkaraly (Kazakh: Қарқаралы, Qarqaraly), also known as Karkaralinsk (Russian: Каркаралинск), is the capital of the Karkaraly District in the Karaganda Region of Kazakhstan. Permanent settlement in the area began as a Cossack settlement, which evolved into a Kazakh cultural center due to the Koyandy Fair which took place in the town. Its population was 9,212 as of 2009.

== Etymology ==
A local legend suggests that the name is derived from the term Qarqara, a decorative Kazakh headpiece. According to the legend, long ago a beautiful girl dropped her qarqara in the area that is now Karkaraly. Her search was in vain and the qarqara remained on the steppe. The legend states that though the beautiful karkara was lost, the beauty of the land will remain forever.

== Geography ==
The town of Karkaraly is nestled against the Karkaraly Range, by the Karkaraly river. Karagaily, a mining town, lies 17 kilometers (11 mi) to the northeast. The forests and mountains of Karkaraly have been protected by various government agencies since 1884. In 1998, these lands were reorganized as the Karkaraly National Park. The park encompasses 90,323 hectares, and includes large amounts of forests and mountains. Karkaraly National Park is home to 122 species of birds, 45 species of mammals, 6 species of reptile and 2 amphibian species. A number of species in the park are listed in Kazakhstan's Red Book of protected species, including the argali, the black stork, and the golden eagle.

The Karkaraly and Kent Mountains are well known for their unique rock formations and "hidden" mountain lakes. Hiking, cross-country skiing, downhill skiing, photo safari and cultural guides by the national park, and swimming in the mountains lakes are all popular activities for tourists.

=== Climate ===
Like other places in the Kazakh Steppes, Karkaraly's climate is characterized by long, cold winters, and hot summers. Temperatures typically remain below freezing from November through March. The summer months of June through August, often sees daily temperatures exceeding 25 °C, as well as more precipitation than other parts of the year.

Climate data for Karkaraly
Month	Jan	Feb	Mar	Apr	May	Jun	Jul	Aug	Sep	Oct	Nov	Dec	Year
Mean daily maximum °C (°F)	−11 (12)	−11 (12)	−3 (27)	11 (52)	19 (66)	25 (77)	27 (81)	24 (75)	19 (66)	8 (46)	−1 (30)	−8 (18)	8 (47)
Mean daily minimum °C (°F)	−21 (−6)	−22 (−8)	−13 (9)	−1 (30)	6 (43)	11 (52)	14 (57)	11 (52)	5 (41)	−2 (28)	−10 (14)	−17 (1)	−3 (26)
Average precipitation mm (inches)	11 (0.4)	13 (0.5)	13 (0.5)	19 (0.7)	34 (1.3)	33 (1.3)	42 (1.7)	30 (1.2)	20 (0.8)	25 (1.0)	19 (0.7)	13 (0.5)	272 (10.6)
Average precipitation days	11	9	9	7	9	8	9	7	6	10	11	11	107
Source: meteo-tv.ru

== History ==
=== Ancient Times ===
In the Paleozoic Age (250–300 million years ago), this area of Kazakhstan was an inland sea. The water retreated 1.2 to 2 million years ago, when the ancient Paleozoic shield was cracked by granite. The area lifted and created the Kent and Karkaraly Mountains. The rocks and cliffs have been here ever since and for many thousands of years the untamable steppe wind and precipitation has sculpted the rocks into unique shapes.

People have lived in the Karkaraly area since ancient times. The earliest archeological finds connected with ancient people dates back to the Paleolithic (or Stone) Age. Artifacts such as knives, scrapers, and spear heads have been found within what is now Karkaraly National Park. Archeological sites from the Bronze Age have been investigated more. Artifacts and cemeteries from the Andronovo culture (18th-14th centuries BC) have been discovered. In one case, a cemetery was found with two tombs inside a stone fence. Stone coffins were found at a depth of one meter. In the tomb were also pots, items made of bronze, an axe, arrowheads, knives, female adornments, and items made of gold, bone and stone.

The Akimek Settlement in the Kent Mountains has been one of the most investigated sites in the area. It also belonged to the Andronovo people. They raised cattle and established settlements along bodies of waters. Settlements were small and usually consisted of houses erected of stone and wood. They focused mainly on raising cows, instead of sheep and horses. They had wheeled transport, including chariots. The remains of a fighting chariot have been found in the tomb of an Andronovo soldier, excavated in the Karkaraly area. The people were also engaged in hoe-mattock agriculture. The metallurgy of the Bronze Age was highly advanced. Andronovo people were of European descent and are the most ancient genetic ancestors of the Kazakh people. DNA tests have revealed that 60% of the tested remains had light hair and blue or green eyes.

During the late Bronze Age (13th–9th centuries BC), successors of the Andronovo people created the Begazy-dandybai culture. In the Kent Mountains, 12 settlements and 10 cemeteries have been uncovered. The ancient city of Kent was also uncovered. Kent is the biggest settlement from the Bronze Age known in the Republic of Kazakhstan. The settlement was 30 hectares large and was home to 1,000 people. The town was divided into streets and quarters, including a quarter for metallurgists in which copper and bronze artifacts have been found. Most likely the inhabitants of Kent were skilled metallurgists. Huge furnaces have been found for the purpose of creating bronze. Excavations of Kent have amazed archeologist with an abundance of bronze products and unusual artifacts. Researchers now guess the area was inhabited for 200–300 years. Kent is believed to have been an important political and economical regional center (ceramics found in Kent prove that the settlement had numerous commercial and political contacts with western Siberia, Central Asia, Xinjiang and Iran). It is also believed that the inhabitants of Kent did not have a system of writing. The ancient city of Kent is currently located in Karkaraly National Park.

Archeological sites from the early Iron Age (8th-7th centuries BC to 1st century AD) have also been found throughout the territory of the national park, but these sites have been investigated far less.

Another famous archeological site, from more recent times, is the mid-17th century Dzungar monastery, in the Kent Mountains. The name of the monument is “Kyzyl Kensh Palace", which means "red ore" or "red city". According to scientists, the monastery was inhabited for as much as 50 years. In the 19th century an ethnographic expedition from Tsarist Russia was conducted in the Kent Mountains. During this time period, part of the complex was still standing. One two-story building was almost untouched and one could see red paint on some of the inner walls. The ceiling was propped up by six wooden columns, carved and covered with gold paint. Unfortunately, after this period, the palace was destroyed for logs and stone. The ruins are now inside Karkaraly National Park and some efforts have been made to restore the palace.

=== Russian Empire ===
Present-day Karkaraly began with the construction of a fortress in 1824, which developed into a Cossack settlement by 1827. In 1868, Karkaraly was incorporated as a town, and became the capital of a Tsarist district, which formed part of the Semipalatinsk Region.

==== Role as a cultural center ====
The town was home to the famous Koyandy Fair, which served as a major economic and cultural gathering throughout the Kazakh Steppes, helping Karkaraly attract the attention of many who were interested in Kazakh arts. Major cultural figures who visited Karkaraly during the time of the Russian Empire included Abai Qunanbaiuly, Shoqan Walikhanov, Mikhail Prishvin, Grigory Potanin, Aleksandr Zatayevich, and Mukhtar Auezov.

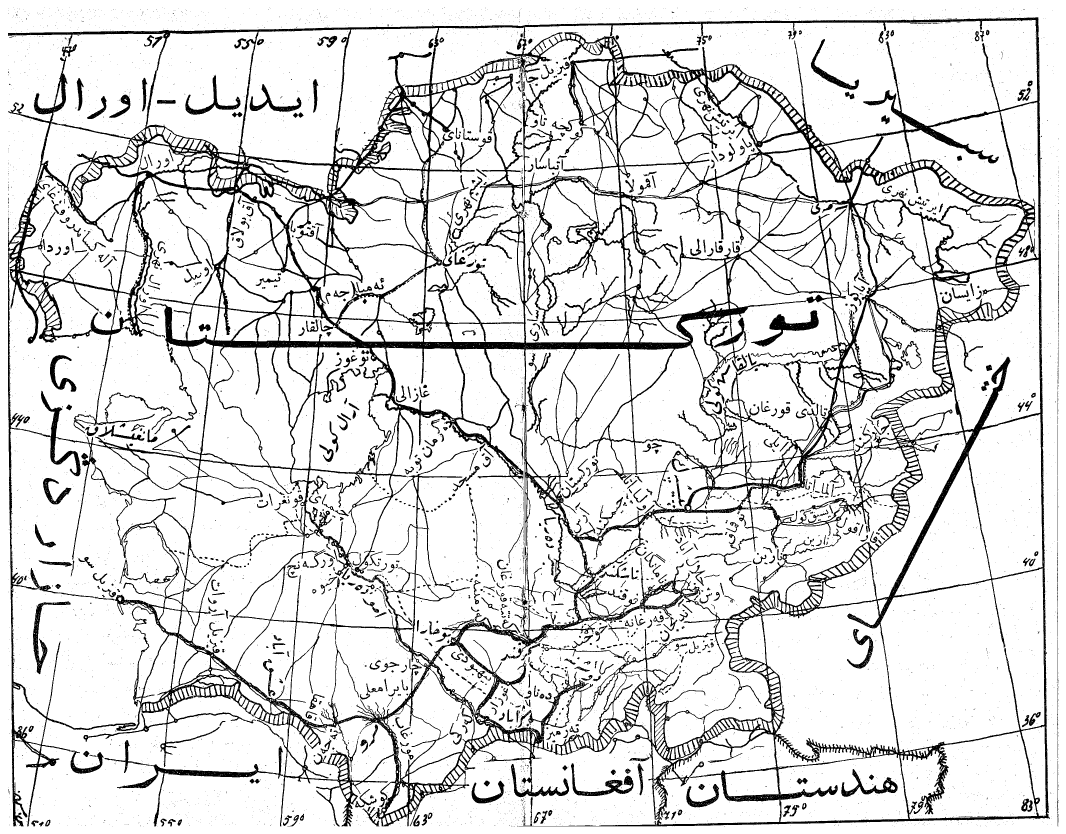
Chaghatay-language map marking the city of Karkaraly (قارقارالی, Qarqaralï) within Turkestan (تورکستان, Türkistan), from the November 1931 issue of the Berlin-based Yash Turkistan magazine

=== Soviet Union ===
During the 1920s and 1930s, a number of people in Karkaraly fell victim to political repression and starvation, which the town honors via a monument in the town center. When World War II broke out, many from Karkaraly enlisted in the Red Army, with four of the towns residents earning the honor Hero of the Soviet Union, and one additional resident earning the Order of Lenin. A monument in the town's park honors those who served during the war.

During Soviet times, many industrial workers and young pioneers would vacation in and around Karkaraly.

== Demographics ==
In the 2009 Kazakhstani Census, Karkaraly was recorded as having a population of 9,212, up from the 8,773 recorded in 1999. Of the 9,212 people living in the town, 4,491 of them were men, and 4,721 were women.

== Economy ==
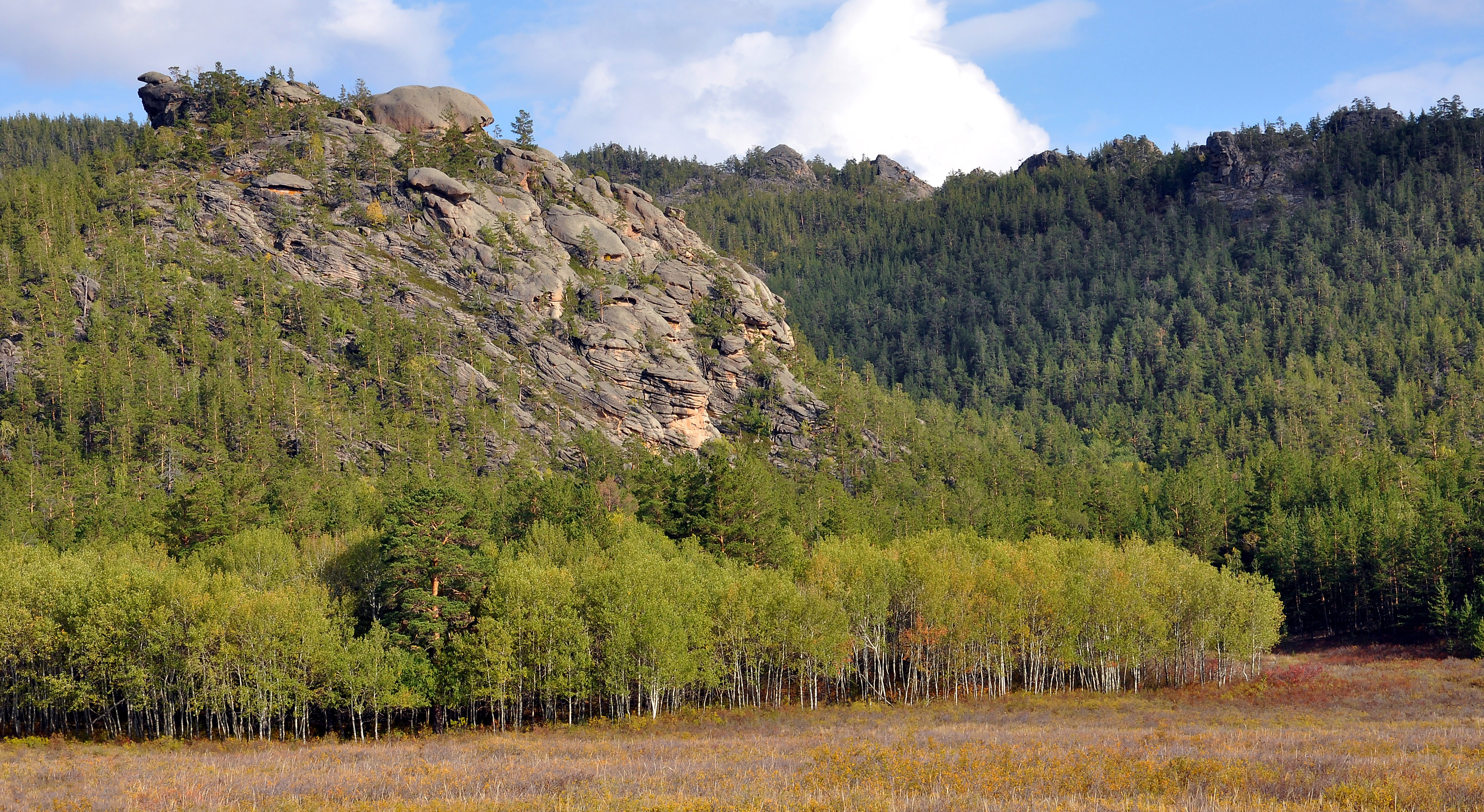
Karkaraly National Park

The main sectors of Karkaraly's economy include agriculture, mining, and tourism.

The following ore deposits have all been found and mined in the area: barite, iron, copper, gold, molybdenum, and tungsten. In the Karkaraly mountains, nearly 100 minerals can be found, including: smoky topaz, crystal, chalcopyrite, azurite, chalcedony, and malachite. Significant reserves of building materials are also in the area: granite, marble, limestone, gypsum, gravel, pebbles and sand. Also along numerous lakes are large deposits of mud which are used medicinally in spas.

Since Soviet times, Karkaraly National Park has drawn considerable tourism to the town. In addition to tourists, many researchers and students travel to Karkaraly to study the region's ecology and archeological sites.

Economic development has been hindered by poor infrastructural links, particularly in regards to the area's roads. The local government has stated that they are working on improving the town's infrastructure.

== Culture ==
Karkaraly emerged as a cultural center during the 19th century, largely due to the famous Koyandy Fair, which served as a major economic and cultural gathering throughout the Kazakh Steppes. This helped attract a number of famous intellectuals to visit. Shoqan Walikhanov, a Kazakh ethnographer and historian, visited the town twice and wrote a piece on the local culture. The town is said to have inspired a number of works by Mikhail Prishvin, who visited in 1909. Russian ethnographer Grigory Potanin visited Karkaraly in 1913 to study Kazakh folklore. Aleksandr Zatayevich visited the town to collect traditional Kazakh songs. Writer and activist Mukhtar Auezov also visited the town shortly after the Alash Autonomy declared independence. Famous Kazakh poet Abai Kunanbaev was also known to frequent Karkaraly.

=== Places of Interest ===
==== House of Аbai ====
Abai Kunanbaev (1845–1904) was a famous Kazakh poet, founder of the modern Kazakh literature, and composer. As a child, Аbai Kunanbaev traveled through this area on his way to the Koyandy Fair and stayed in “the dark blue house” that belonged to a local family. The house was constructed without nails. M. Auezov describes Abai's stay in Qarqaraly in the novel “The Way of Abai.” Currently the building is the town's music school.

==== Kunanbay Mosque ====
The Kunanbay Mosque is a wooden mosque built in the town in 1851. This mosque was financed by the father of Abai Kunabaev, who served as the area's governor from 1849 to 1853. Permission for the construction was granted in 1847 by the heads of the 16 surrounding townships and stamped by Sultan Kusbeka Taukeuly. At the time of construction, the town only had blueprints for a church. This is the reason why the mosque looks remarkably like a church in design. At the mosque a madrasas was built, which is housing for students and home for the mullahs (Islamic clergy). The mosque served as a place to educate children and the spread the word of Islam in the Karkaraly District. Kunanbaya Mosque is perhaps one of the first mosques in the northern regions of Kazakhstan. Initially it was a log building, but later face boards were put on it. For years the mosque was the site of Muslim teachings. The minaret of the mosque was destroyed in 1920. During Soviet times, the mosque served as a meeting spot for trade unions, a meeting spot for pioneer meetings, and as a library. The mosque was restored after Kazakhstan gained its independence.

==== The house where Potanin stayed ====
Grigory Potanin, a famous Russian traveler, visited Karkaraly in 1913 to study Kazakh folklore. During his time in Karkaraly, Potanin stayed in a house that belonged a local merchant surnamed Ryazantsev. Before it was a home, the wooden building housed a trading company named “Kuzmin and Derov”. On November 6, 1890, Rayzantseva bought the building for 600 rubles. In 1920 the house was purchased by the state. The building housed various Soviet institutions, including schools. In 2004, this house became the district's library, which it still is today.

==== Monument of the 78 Communists ====
The Monument of the 78 Communists is a monument in the town center of Karkaraly dedicated to townspeople who died during the early Soviet times. In the spring of 1921, after being defeated near the city of Akmola, an armed detachment of rebels led by Captain Tokarev retreated south-east to the border of China. Along the way they attacked communist party and government officials and led an anti-communism campaign, using propagandist slogans such as 'down with the appropriation of surpluses' and 'long live the soviets without the communists'. On April 6, 700 wagons carrying 2,500 people entered Karkaraly, where there were only 50 Red Army soldiers and about 60 Communists. The Communists, while gathered for an emergency meeting in the People's House, were arrested, interrogated, tortured, and then killed. 78 people were killed in 6 days. On April 12, the rebels left town two days before the arrival of detachments from the Red Army. On April 23, the detachment, including volunteers from Pavlodar (550 bayonets and 70 swords), overtook the rebels 180 km southeast of Karkaraly. A battle took place and the rebels fled to China. In autumn of 1921, an agreement with the Chinese authorities allowed the 13th Caucasian division of the Red Army to cross the border. They defeated and captured the remaining members of the gang. In May 1922 a trail was held in Krasnoyarsk. Captain Tokarev and the other gang members were shot to death.

==== The Mourning Mother Memorial ====
In the town park of Karkaraly, a monument named the Mourning Mother Memorial honors those that the town lost during World War II. The monument is next to an obelisk named “Fighting Glory”, which consists of an obelisk in the form of a bayonet (8 meters tall) next to an eternal flame. Next to this is a woman wearing traditional dress, sadly holding her hands in front of her. Two stones in front of the memorial read in Russian and Kazakh: “Eternal glory to our local countrymen who fell in the Great Patriotic War of 1941-1945.”

== Notable people from Karkaraly ==
- Kazybek Bi (kk:Қазыбек би) (1667–1763) - orator, diplomat, and one of the authors of the first systematic set of Kazakh customs

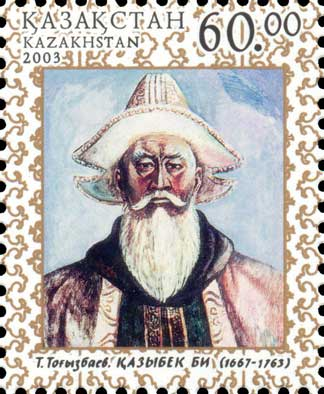
Kazybek bi

- Madi Bapiuly (ru:Мади Бапиулы) (1880–1921) - poet, singer, and composer.
- Zhakyr Akbaev (1876–1934)- among the first Kazakhs to have an LL.M (master of laws), historian, and scholar.
- Nurken Abdirov (1919–1942)- Air Force pilot and Hero of the Soviet Union.
- Toktar Aubakirov (1946)- distinguished test pilot, Kazakhstan's first cosmonaut, Doctor of Technical Sciences, professor, Major General, and Hero of the Soviet Union.
- Erlan Idrissov (April 28, 1959)- current Ambassador of Kazakhstan to the United States. He previously served as Foreign Minister in the Government of Kazakhstan from 1999 to 2002.
