= Karkaraly District =

Coordinates: 49°28′12″N 75°30′36″E

Karkaraly
- District
- Қарқаралы ауданы
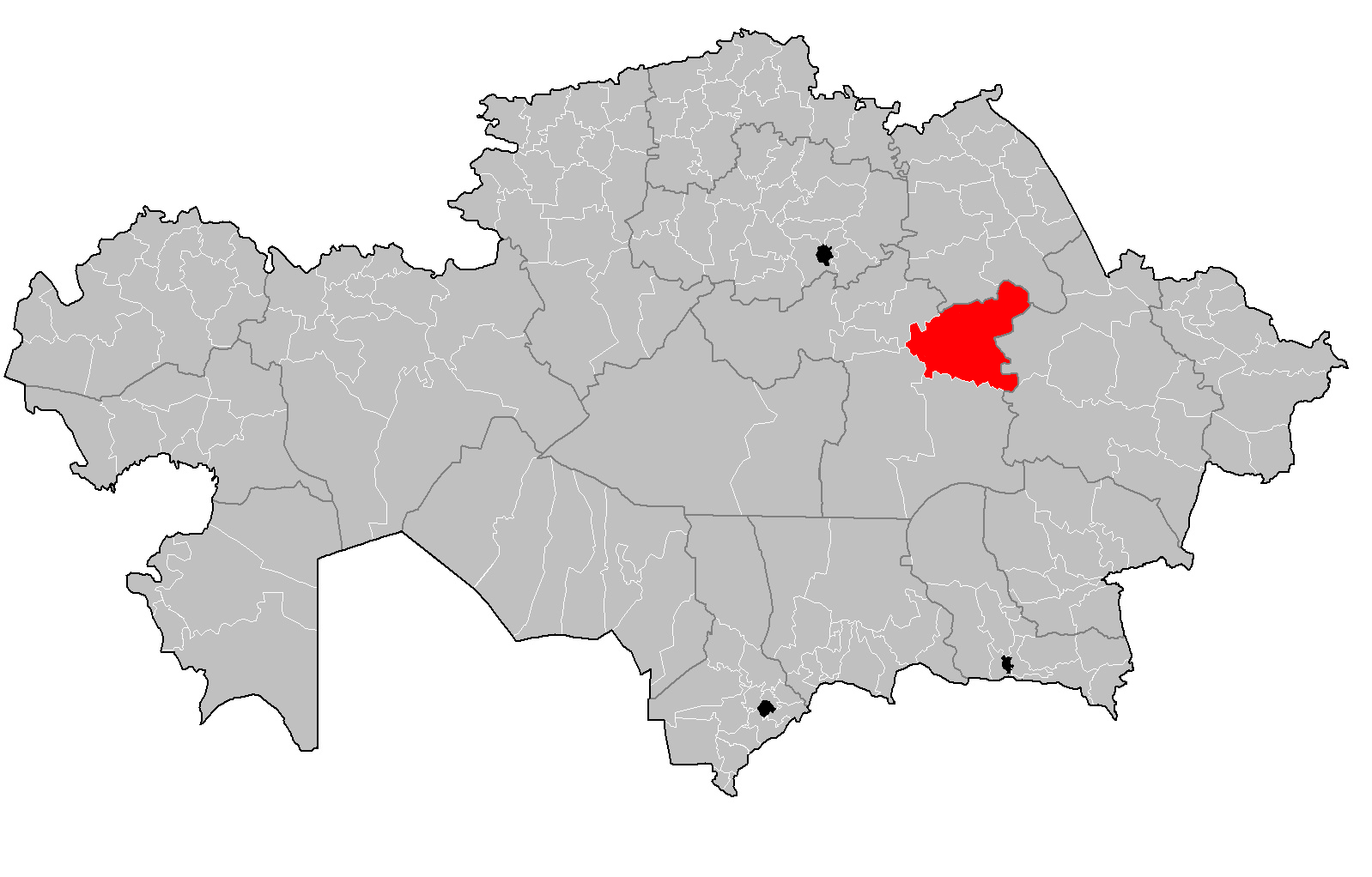
- Country: Kazakhstan
- Region: Karaganda Region
- Administrative center: Karkaraly
- Founded: 1930

Government
  - Akim: Adilzhan Argynov

Area
  - Total: 53,600 km^{2} (20,700 sq mi)

Population (2019)
  - Total: 36,025
- Time zone: UTC+6 (East)

Karkaraly District (Kazakh: Қарқаралы ауданы, Qarqaraly audany) is a district of Karaganda Region in central Kazakhstan. The administrative center of the district is the town of Karkaraly. As of 2019, the district is home to a population of 36,025 people.

== Geography ==
Karasor, an endorheic salt lake, is located in the district, north of the Karkaraly and Kent mountain ranges.

== History ==
The Karkaraly District is home to the Kent Settlement, located in the village of Kent, an archeological digsite which dates back to the Bronze Age. Discovered in 1985, the site includes a proto-city which spans 30 hectares, complementary farmland which exceeds 100 hectares in area, a religious building, and furnaces used to make bronze and possibly iron.

During the times of the Russian Empire, the town of Karkaraly was home to the Koyandy Fair, one of the largest economic and cultural gatherings in the Kazakh Steppes. Major figures who visited the town during the time of the Russian Empire included Abai Kunanbaev, Shoqan Walikhanov, Mikhail Prishvin, Grigory Potanin, Aleksandr Zatayevich, and Mukhtar Auezov.

== Demographics ==
The district reported 36,025 inhabitants as of 2019, of which most were ethnic Kazakhs.

Ethnic Groups of Karkaraly District
Ethnic Group	Population (2019)	Percent of Total
Kazakhs	34,604	96.06%
Russians	1,074	2.98%
Tatars	115	0.32%
Germans	86	0.24%
Ukrainians	41	0.11%
Belarusians	17	0.05%
Bashkirs	13	0.04%
Chechens	13	0.04%
Moldovans	9	0.02%
Uzbeks	6	0.02%
Chuvash	5	0.01%
Azeris	4	0.01%
Lithuanians	4	0.01%
Koreans	4	0.01%
Poles	3	<0.01%
Mordvins	1	<0.01%
Others	26	0.07%
Total	36,025	100.00%
