= Akore =

Akore Ақөре
- Location in Kazakhstan
- Coordinates: 50°08′57″N 74°34′20″E
- Country: Kazakhstan
- Region: Karaganda Region
- District: Bukhar-Zhyrau District
- Established: 1826

Population (2009)
  - Total: 519
- Time zone: UTC+6
- Postcode: 100402

Akore (Kazakh: Ақөре), known as "Kalininskoye" until 1993, is a settlement in Bukhar-Zhyrau District, Karaganda Region, Kazakhstan. It is the administrative center and only settlement of the Akore rural district (KATO code - 35403310). Population: 519 (2009 census results); 1,079 (1999 census results).

== History ==
The settlement named Bogorodskoye was founded in 1908. In 1925 it was renamed Kalininskoye.

== Geography ==
Akore lies in the Kazakh Uplands about 60 kilometers (37 mi) to the northeast of the district capital Botakara. Lake Saumalkol lies 11 kilometers (6.8 mi) to the south. The Karaganda — Semizbughy highway passes near the village.
