= Shalkar (village) =

Shalkar Шалқар
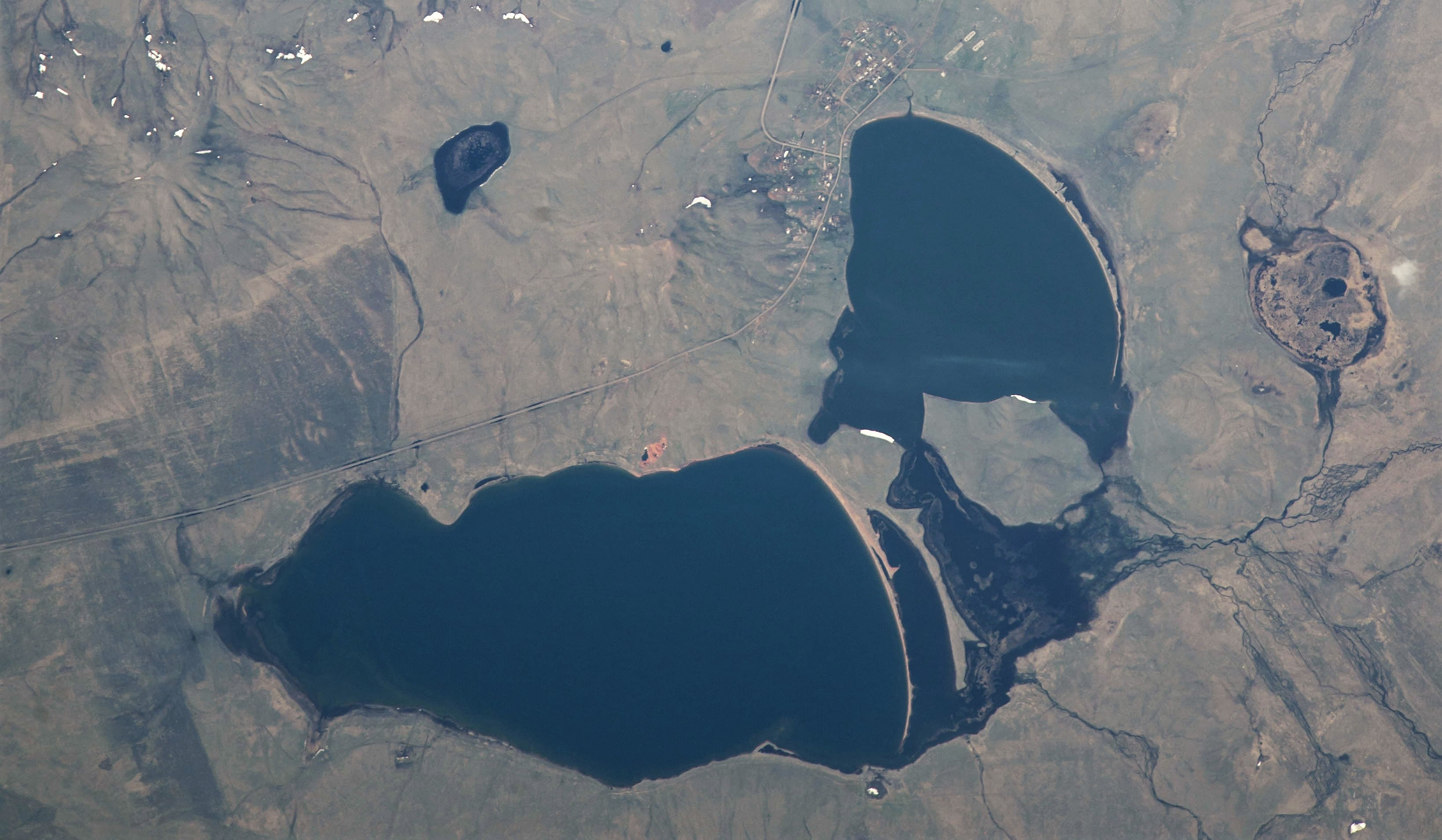
- ISS image of Rudnichnoye and Shalkar village by the northern shore of the lake

- Location in Kazakhstan
- Coordinates: 50°15′00″N 74°53′37″E
- Country: Kazakhstan
- Region: Karaganda Region
- District: Bukhar-Zhyrau District

Population (2009)
  - Total: 197
- Time zone: UTC+6

Shalkar (Kazakh: Шалқар), formerly known as "Pobeda" (Победа), is a village in the Karaganda Region, Kazakhstan. It was founded in 1870 as a settlement. It is part of the Bukhar-Zhyrau rural district (KATO code - 354043300). Population: 197 (2009 census results); 319 (1999 census results).

== Geography ==
Shalkar is located by the shore of the northern tip of lake Rudnichnoye. Semizbughy village is located to the southwest of the village, beyond the lake. Botakara, the district center, lies 84 kilometers (52 mi) to the east of the village.
