= Saumalkol, Bukhar-Zhyrau District =

Lake in Kazakhstan

Saumalkol
- Саумалкөл
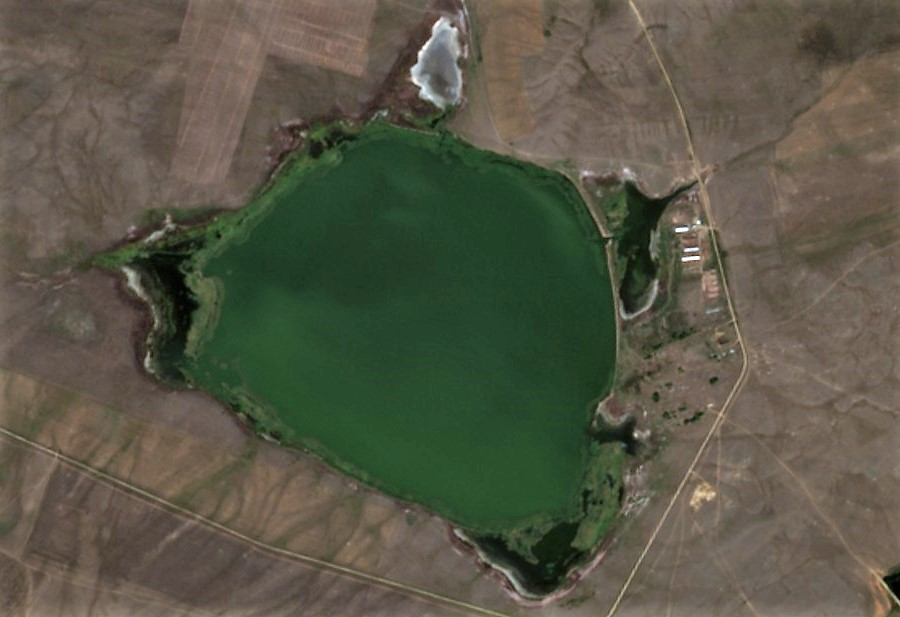
- Sentinel-2 image of the lake

- Location within Kazakhstan
- Location: Kazakh Uplands
- Coordinates: 50°01′36″N 74°33′00″E
- Type: endorheic
- Primary outflows: none
- Catchment area: 52 square kilometers (20 sq mi)
- Basin countries: Kazakhstan
- Max. length: 2.8 kilometers (1.7 mi)
- Max. width: 2.2 kilometers (1.4 mi)
- Surface area: 4.5 square kilometers (1.7 sq mi)
- Max. depth: 3.5 meters (11 ft)
- Water volume: 0.75 cubic kilometers (0.18 cu mi)
- Residence time: UTC+6
- Shore length^{1}: 10 kilometers (6.2 mi)
- Surface elevation: 625.7 meters (2,053 ft)
- ^{1} Shore length is not a well-defined measure.

Saumalkol (Kazakh: Саумалкөл; Russian: Саумалколь), also known as "Ashchykol" (Kazakh: Ащыкөл), is a permanent lake in Bukhar-Zhyrau District, Karaganda Region, Kazakhstan.

The nearest inhabited place is Akore, former Kalininskoye, located 11 kilometers (6.8 mi) to the north. The now uninhabited hamlet of Rubinskoye lies in ruins near the eastern lakeshore.

== Geography ==
Saumalkol is an endorheic lake in the Nura basin, Kazakh Uplands. It lies roughly 30 kilometers (19 mi) southwest of lake Rudnichnoye. The lake is relatively deep and has water all year round. Its surface usually freezes in late November and thaws by the end of March.

There are plowed fields and cattle-grazing grounds in the basin of the lake. The lakeshore is open and flat. Saumalkol is fed mainly by precipitation and groundwater. The waters are rich in fish.

== See also ==
- List of lakes of Kazakhstan
