= Baikadam (Karaganda Region) =

Baikadam Байқадам
- Selo
- Baiqadam
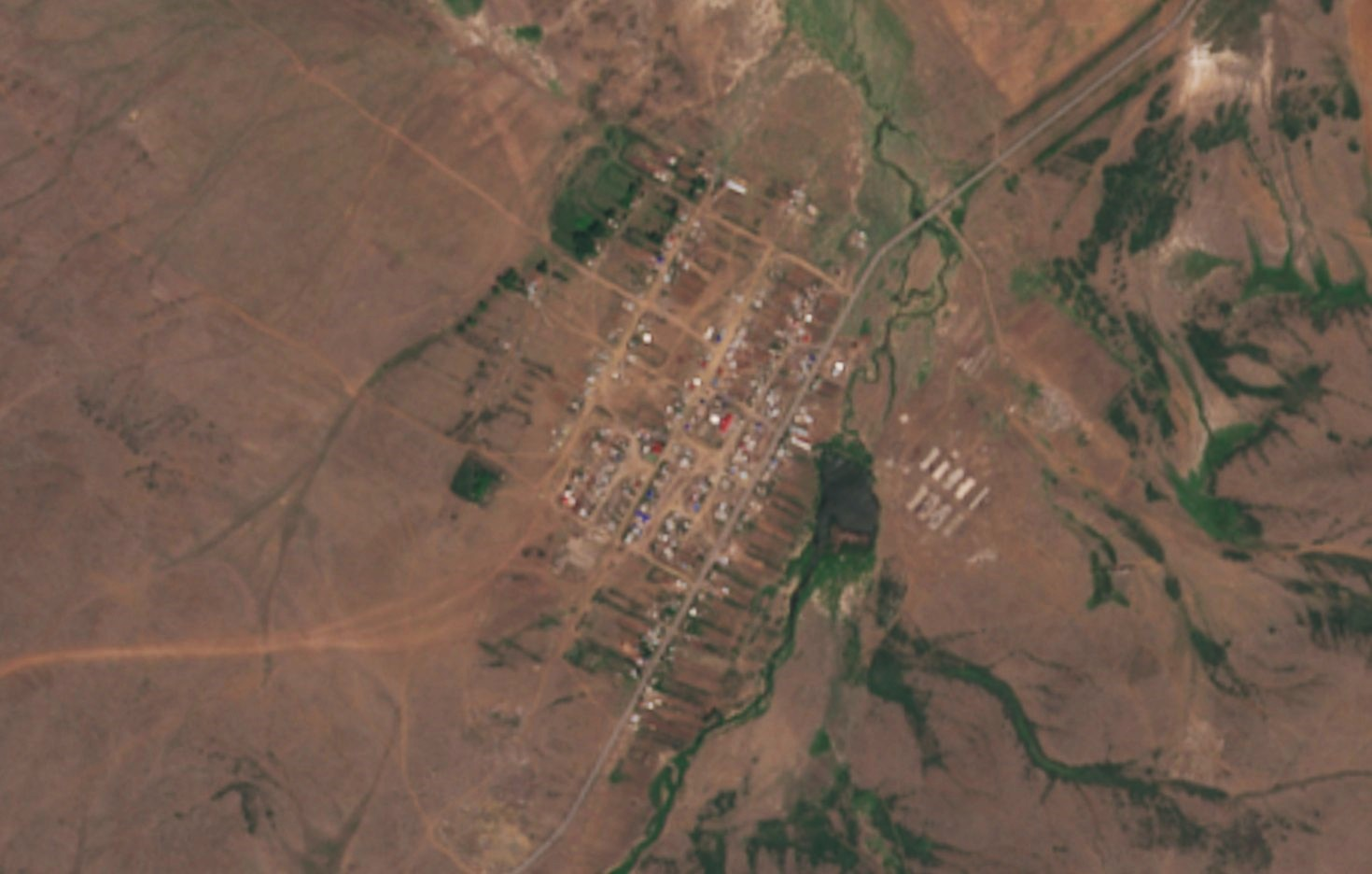
- A satellite image of the selo (Sentinel-2 L1C data, modified)

- Location in Kazakhstan
- Coordinates: 50°00′50″N 73°23′10″E
- Country: Kazakhstan
- Region: Karaganda Region

Population (2009)
  - Total: 815
- Postal code: 100403

Baikadam (Kazakh: Байқадам) is a selo in the Bukhar-Zhyrau District of the Karaganda Region in Kazakhstan. It is a part of the Kokpekty Rural District. It is located approximately 24 km to the west of the district capital, the town of Botakara. Code CATO - 354053200.

== Population ==
In the year 1999, the population of the selo was 661 people (333 men and 328 women). According to the 2009 census, there were 815 people (411 men and 404 women).
