= Baimyrza (Karaganda Region) =

Baimyrza Баймырза
- Selo
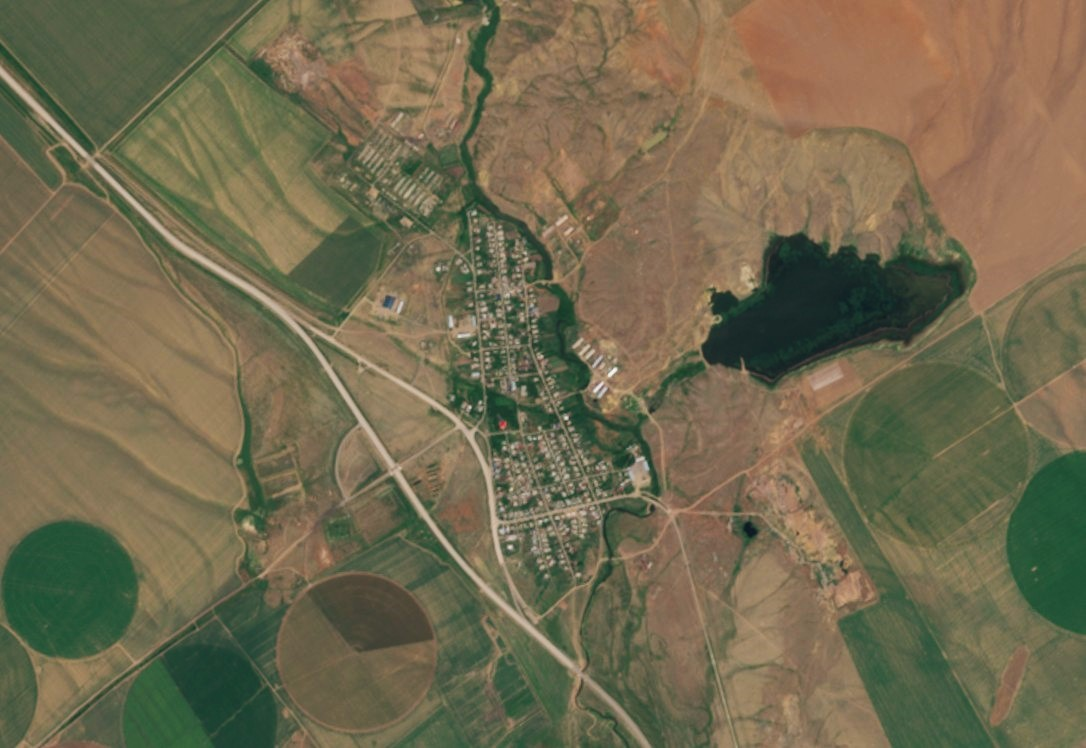
- A satellite image of the selo (Sentinel-2 L1C data, modified)

- Location in Kazakhstan
- Coordinates: 50°13′14″N 72°53′51″E
- Country: Kazakhstan
- Region: Karaganda Region

Population (2009)
  - Total: 1,916
- Postal code: 100432
- Area code: +7 72138

Baimyrza (Kazakh: Баймырза) is a selo in the Bukhar-Zhyrau District of the Karaganda Region in Kazakhstan. It is the administrative centre of the Baimyrza Rural District. It is located approximately 61 km from the district capital, Botakara.

== History ==
The selo was founded in 1906 by Estonian and German settlers from the Governorate of Livonia.

== Population ==
In the year 1999, the population of the selo was 1936 people (950 men and 986 women). According to the 2009 census, the population was 1916 (955 men and 961 women).
