= Botakara (lake) =

Lake in Kazakhstan

- Ботақара
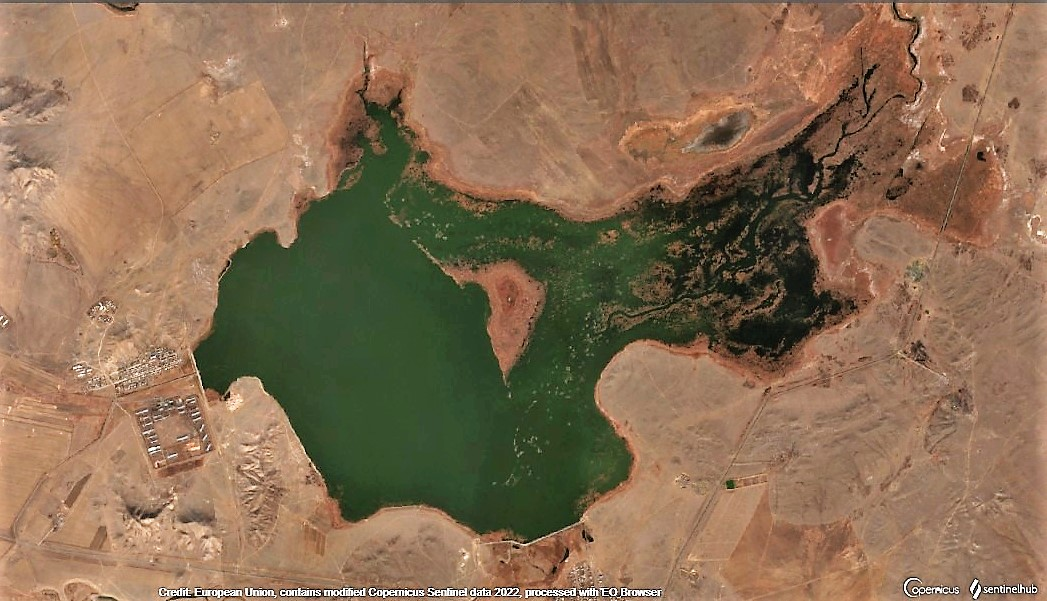
- Sentinel-2 image of the lake

- Location within Kazakhstan
- Location: Kazakh Uplands
- Coordinates: 50°06′N 73°41′E
- Primary inflows: Otkelsiz
- Basin countries: Kazakhstan
- Max. length: 4.2 kilometers (2.6 mi)
- Max. width: 2.5 kilometers (1.6 mi)
- Surface area: 7.3 square kilometers (2.8 sq mi)
- Max. depth: 5 meters (16 ft)
- Residence time: UTC+6
- Islands: One
- Settlements: Botakara

Botakara (Kazakh: Ботақара) is a lake in Bukhar-Zhyrau District, Karaganda Region, Kazakhstan. It is part of the Nura basin.

Botakara village (formerly "Ulyanovsk") lies to the south close to the lakeshore. To the west lies a separate sector of the settlement, including the high school and a poultry farm.

== Geography ==
Botakara lake lies in the Kazakh Uplands. The area of the lake is characterized by steppe vegetation and low smooth hills, the largest of which is 669 meters (2,195 ft) high. The lakeshores are flat and sandy and the bottom of the lake has smooth clay. The water of the lake is fresh and slightly hard. The southwestern and northwestern shorelines are almost joined by seasonally submerged landspits, stretching to an island in the middle.

The Nura flows 2 kilometers (1.2 mi) to the south of the lake. The Otkelsiz (Kazakh: Өткелсіз) river enters the lake from the northeast and flows out of it from the southern shore to join the Nura. Botakara lake freezes in November and stays under ice until early April. The highest level of the lake is in April during the spring floods, when it almost doubles in size.

== Flora and fauna ==
Reeds and sedges grow in stretches of the shore. There are numerous waterfowl in the lake. The main fish species in its waters are perch, karabalik and carp.

== See also ==
- List of lakes of Kazakhstan
