= Ashchysu =

Ashchysu (Kazakh: Ащысу; "Bitter river") may refer to:

- Ashchysu (Ayr), a river with its mouth in Alkamergen lake, Kazakhstan
- Ashchysu (Nura), a tributary of the Nura river, Kazakhstan
- Ashchysu (Shagan), a tributary of the Shagan river, Kazakhstan
