= Tasshoky (Bukhar-Zhyrau District) =

Tasshoky Тасшоқы
- Selo
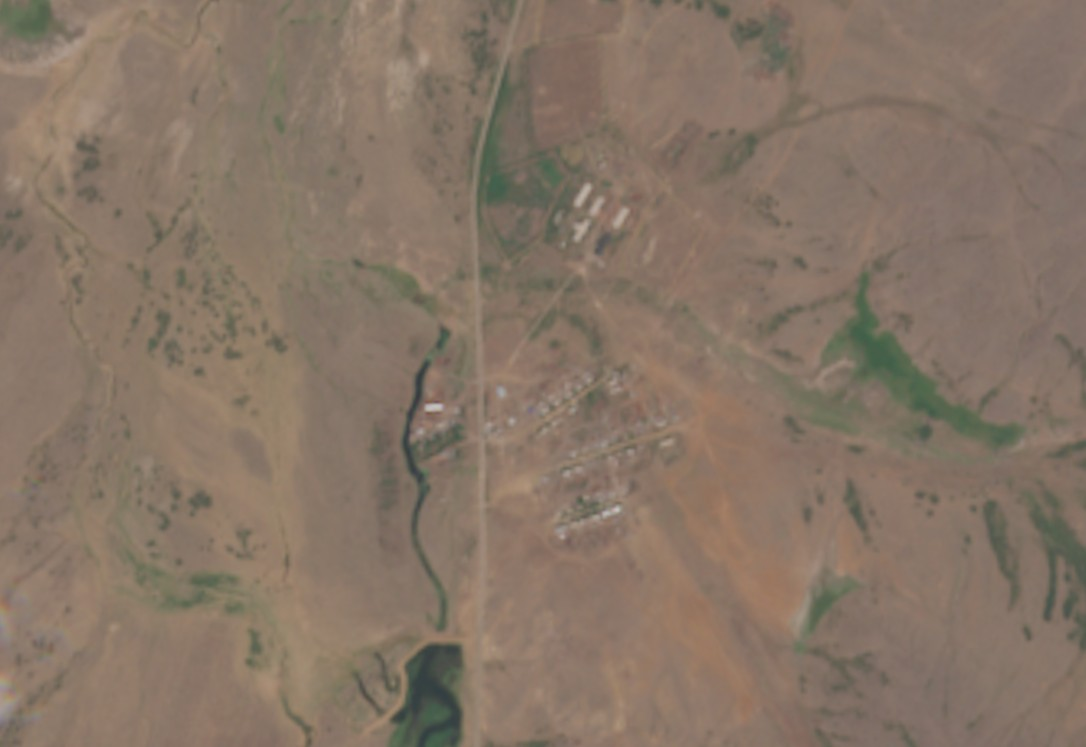
- Tasshoky as seen from space (Sentinel-2 L1C, modified)

- Location in Kazakhstan
- Coordinates: 49°57′14″N 73°36′03″E
- Country: Kazakhstan
- Region: Karaganda Region
- District: Bukhar-Zhyrau District

Population (2009)
  - Total: 304

Tasshoky (Kazakh: Тасшоқы) is a selo in the Bukhar-Zhyrau District of the Karaganda Region in Kazakhstan. It is a part of the Togyzkudyk Rural District.

== Population ==
In the year 1999, the population of the selo was 347 people (179 men and 168 women). According to the 2009 census, there were 304 people (153 men and 151 women).
