= Kokand–Dzungar War (1742–1745) =

Mid-18th-century conflict in Central Asia

- Part of the Kazakh–Dzungar Wars
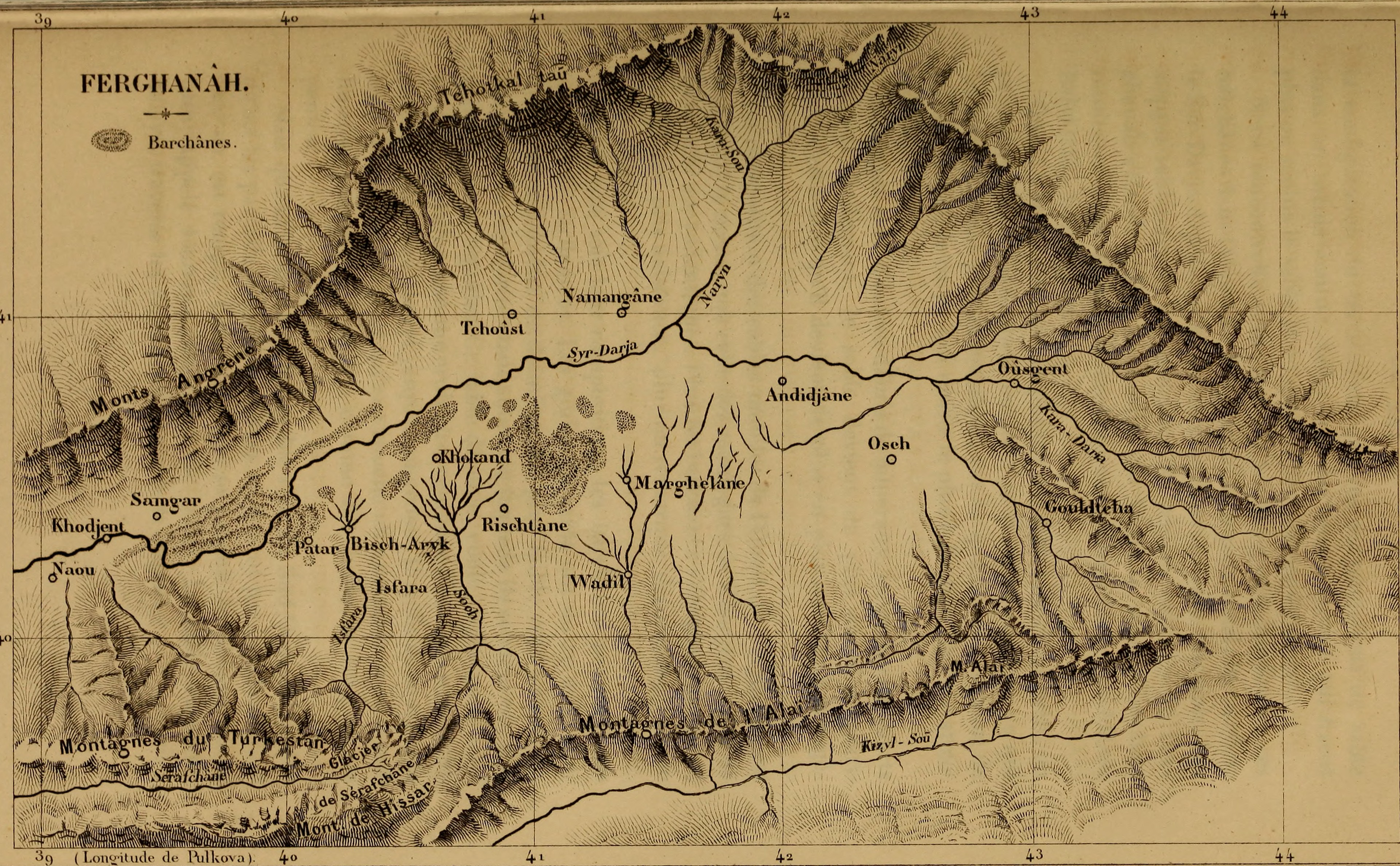
- Map of Fergana Valley
| Date | 1742–1745 |
| Location | Kokand Khanate, Senior Jüz territory |
| Result | Kokand victory: Decline of Dzungar Khanate |
| Territorial changes | Liberation of the Senior Jüz from Dzungar dependence |

Belligerents
| Khanate of Kokand; Kazakh Khanate (Note: Most of the Kazakh rulers, despite the attempts of the khans of Kokand to draw them into the Kokand-Dzungar conflict on their side, declined to participate in this war, with the exception of the influential biy of the Senior Zhuz, Tole, who settled with his subordinate clans within the borders of the Kokand Khanate.): Senior jüz; Middle jüz; Supported by: Afsharid dynasty | Dzungar Khanate |

Commanders and leaders
| Abdul Karim Bi; Tole Bi | (Dzungar Khanate) Galdan Tseren (Dzungar Khanate) Septen Noion (Dzungar Khanate) Dagby Noion (Dzungar Khanate) Sary Manji X |

Strength
| Unknown | 1742: (Dzungar Khanate) 30,000; 1745: (Dzungar Khanate) 40,000 |

Casualties and losses
| Unknown | (Dzungar Khanate) ~2,000 killed |

The Kokand–Dzungar War was a conflict fought between the Dzungar Khanate and the Kokand Khanate (supported by Afsharid Iran) from 1742 to 1745. The 1740s relations between the declining Dzungar Khanate and the Kokand which emerged from the fragmented Bukhara Khanate remain largely unstudied in Soviet and foreign historiography. Nevertheless, this conflict with Kokand and its allies critically weakened the Dzungar state, altering the geopolitical landscape of Central Asia. Rulers of the Kazakh Senior jüz and Middle juzes played a significant role in these events.

== Background ==
Initially a vassal of Khujand, Abd al-Rahim founded Kokand, later executed Khujand's ruler, and annexed Andijan, Samarkand, and Shahrisabz. Following his death in 1739/40, his brother Abd al-Karim designated Kokand as the capital. The expansionist efforts of both rulers to unify Fergana and seize Tashkent, southern Kazakhstan, and Kyrgyzstan alarmed Dzungar Khanate ruler Galdan Tseren. However, conflicts with the Qing dynasty, the Kazakh Khanate, Russia in Siberia, and Nadir Shah's Persian forces delayed Dzungar military action against Kokand until the early 1740s. Following the fragmentation of the Bukhara Khanate, Nader Shah's forces captured Samarkand and defeated Khiva, securing the submission of both the ruler of Bukhara and Abd al-Karim, the Bey of Kokand. According to contemporary Kazakh reports to Russian authorities, Abd al-Karim's peaceful submission spared Kokand from Persian devastation, and Nader Shah promised him military assistance for a future campaign against the Dzungar Khanate. According to Persian prisoners captured by Kazakh forces, Nader Shah provided Abd al-Karim with troops and artillery in an attempt to expand Persian influence into southern Kazakhstan and Dzungaria, authorizing him to mobilize regional forces against the Dzungar Khanate. The rise of the Uzbek Ming tribe to power in major Transoxiana cities—including Namangan, Khujand, Kokand, Andijan, and Margilan—significantly weakened Dzungar political and economic control. These cities ceased paying tribute and obstructed Oirat trade caravans traveling to Iran, India, and other Central Asian territories. Diplomatic attempts by Galdan Tseren to force Abd al-Karim to accept Dzungar suzerainty and resume paying tribute failed. Despite previous peaceful trade relations, ties worsened after Kokand mistreated Dzungar merchants. When Galdan Tseren's envoy demanded submission, Kokand officially refused, leading the Dzungars to initiate a military campaign.

== First Kokand camping (1742) ==
In 1742, after securing peace with the Qing dynasty in 1740 and defeating the Kazakh Middle Zhuz in 1739–1740, Galdan Tseren launched a military expedition into Central Asia. Capitalizing on the fact that Nader Shah's forces were weakened by campaigns in the Caucasus, the Dzungar ruler dispatched approximately 30,000 troops led by commanders Septen and Dagba. The Dzungar military plan involved dispersing detachments of 4,000–5,000 troops in multiple directions, targeting Samarkand, Khujand, Kokand, Tashkent, and even Badakhshan. In Tashkent, the Oirats encountered fierce resistance from Kuchuk Bek. Although Galdan Tseren had installed him as ruler following the 1740 assassination of the Kazakh ruler Jolbars Khan by Tashkent's khojas, Kuchuk Bek defected from Dzungar suzerainty to ally with Abd al-Karim of Kokand, resolutely refusing to surrender to the Dzungar commander Agatsak. The Dzungars faced immediate setbacks in their initial engagements. The Kokandians feigned submission to disarm the suspicions of the Dzungar commanders while secretly mobilizing their forces for a surprise counter-attack. In the ensuing battle, the Kokand forces, protected by armor and riding high-quality horses, utilized a unique tactical device: they attached small bells (shilkuntsy) to their horse harnesses. The loud, clattering noise frightened the Dzungar horses, causing chaos in their ranks. Unable to maintain formation, the Dzungars suffered heavy casualties and retreated in confusion. Local nomadic groups, including Kazakh nomads situated north of Tashkent, actively participated in these battles. The Dzungars were only able to capture Tashkent later, after receiving significant reinforcements.

== Second Camping ==
In the spring of 1745, the Dzungars launched a renewed offensive with up to 40,000 men. Abdul Karim Bi preemptively marched on Tashkent, forcing the Dzungar governor to flee, and installed the prominent Kazakh judge Tole Bi as co-governor. Though the Dzungars soon forced Tole Bi to evacuate the city, their commander Sary Manji was poisoned by Tole Bi . The decisive battles occurred beneath the walls of Kokand, resulting in another Oirat defeat. In 1745, Russian Ensign Podzorov reported that Abdul Karim’s Kokand forces successfully ambushed the advancing Dzungar (Oirat) army using hidden, deep trenches. Trapped in the excavations, the Oirat troops were neutralized with matchlocks and close-combat weapons, thwarting their siege of the city. Concurrently, Oirat military campaigns in Badakhshan and Samarkand failed with heavy casualties, leaving them with only limited captures of a few towns along the middle basin of the Syr Darya River. Facing rumors of a Russian invasion in the north and the arrival of 20,000 Persian reinforcement troops in the south, the Dzungar advance faltered. The Dzungars attempted a final siege on Kokand but fell into another trap: the defenders allowed a portion of the army inside, slaughtered them, and collapsed a bridge, killing over 2,000 Dzungar soldiers. The siege turned into a stalemate and ended abruptly when Galdan Tseren died in September 1745. His successor Tsewang Dorji immediately ordered a full withdrawal of the army back to Dzungaria. On November 28, 1745, the ambassador Kuren-Kuchuk, who brought the new khan's message to Russia, reported that the Oirat troops were returning to Dzungaria and that 30,000 soldiers led by Noyon Septen had set off on a campaign against Kokand.

== Aftermath ==
The successful defense against the Dzungar invasion cemented Abdul Karim Bi's absolute authority and strengthened the Kokand Khanate. For the Dzungar Khanate, the massive military and economic losses accelerated the empire's decline and permanently ended its political dominance in Central Asia. Consequently, the Kokand victory directly catalyzed the liberation of the Senior Jüz from Dzungar subjugation.

== See also ==
- Töle Biy
- Galdan Tseren Khan
- Dzungar Khanate
- Kokand Khanate
- Kazakh Khanate
- Kazakh–Dzungar Wars

== Bibliography ==
- Moiseev, Vladimir Anisimovich (1991). Pishchulina, K. A. (ed.). Dzungar Khanate and the Kazakhs (17th–18th centuries) (in Russian). Alma-Ata: Gylym / Institute of Uyghur Studies, Academy of Sciences of the Kazakh SSR. p. 238.
- Kadyrbaev, Alexander Sh. (2023). "Relationships of the Dzungar Khanate with the Neighboring Peoples of Central Asia in the XV–First Half of the XVIII Century". Nomadic Civilization: Historical Research (in Russian). 3 (3): 9–24. doi:10.53315/2782-3377-2023-3-3-9-24. ISSN 2782-3377.
- History of Uzbekistan, Vol. 3. Tashkent, 1993.
- Russian-Dzungar Relations (late 17th — 60s of the 18th centuries): Documents and Extracts. Barnaul: Azbuka, 2006.
- Gokov, O. A. (2022). The Mission of V. A. Frankini in Iran in 1877. Military Aspect. Almaty: Karavan.
