= Ashchysu (Nura) =

River in Kazakhstan

Ashchysu Ащысу
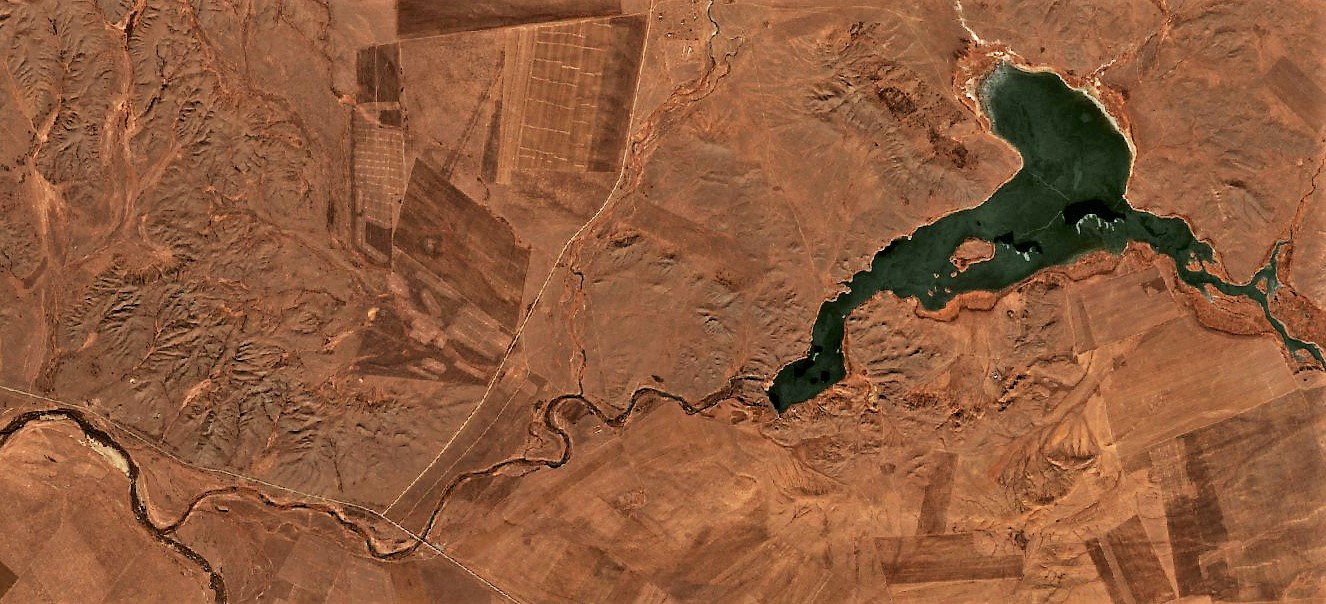
- Sentinel-2 image of the confluence of rivers Ashchysu and Nura (left), with the Ashchysu Reservoir on the right.

- Mouth location in Kazakhstan

Location
- Countries: Kazakhstan

Physical characteristics
- Source: Semizbughy; Kazakh Uplands
  - coordinates: 50°08′21″N 75°58′23″E
  - elevation: ca 700 metres (2,300 ft)
- Mouth: Nura
  - coordinates: 49°55′26″N 74°10′57″E
  - elevation: 556 metres (1,824 ft)
- Length: 85 km (53 mi)
- Basin size: 2,080 km^{2} (800 sq mi)

The Ashchysu (Kazakh: Ащысу; Russian: Ащысу) is a river in May District, Pavlodar Region, and Bukhar-Zhyrau District, Karaganda Region, Kazakhstan. It is 85 kilometres (53 mi) long and has a catchment area of 2,080 square kilometres (800 sq mi).

The river water is used for irrigation of nearby farmland in the summer and to provide drinking water to local settlements.

== Course ==
The Ashchysu has its sources in a spring of the southern slopes of the Semizbughy massif of the Kazakh Uplands. It heads first southwards, then it bends and flows roughly westwards within a plain to the north of the Ayr Mountains. Downwards from its middle course the river channel forms meanders. The water of the river is fresh in the upper reaches, its salinity increasing further downriver. The Ashchysu reservoir is located in the final stretch, about 12 km (7.5 mi) upstream from the confluence with the Nura. Finally it reaches the right bank of river Nura 12 km (7.5 mi) upstream from Sheshenkara village, former Proletarskoye.

The Ashchysu is fed by snow and underground water. The river flows all year round and is frozen between November and mid-April. Its main tributary is the Akkora (Аққора), flowing from the northwest into its right bank.

== Fish ==
Fish species inhabiting the waters of the Ashchysu, the crucian carp, tench, pike, perch and ide.

== See also ==
- List of rivers of Kazakhstan
