= Rudnichnoye =

Lake in Kazakhstan

- Рудничное
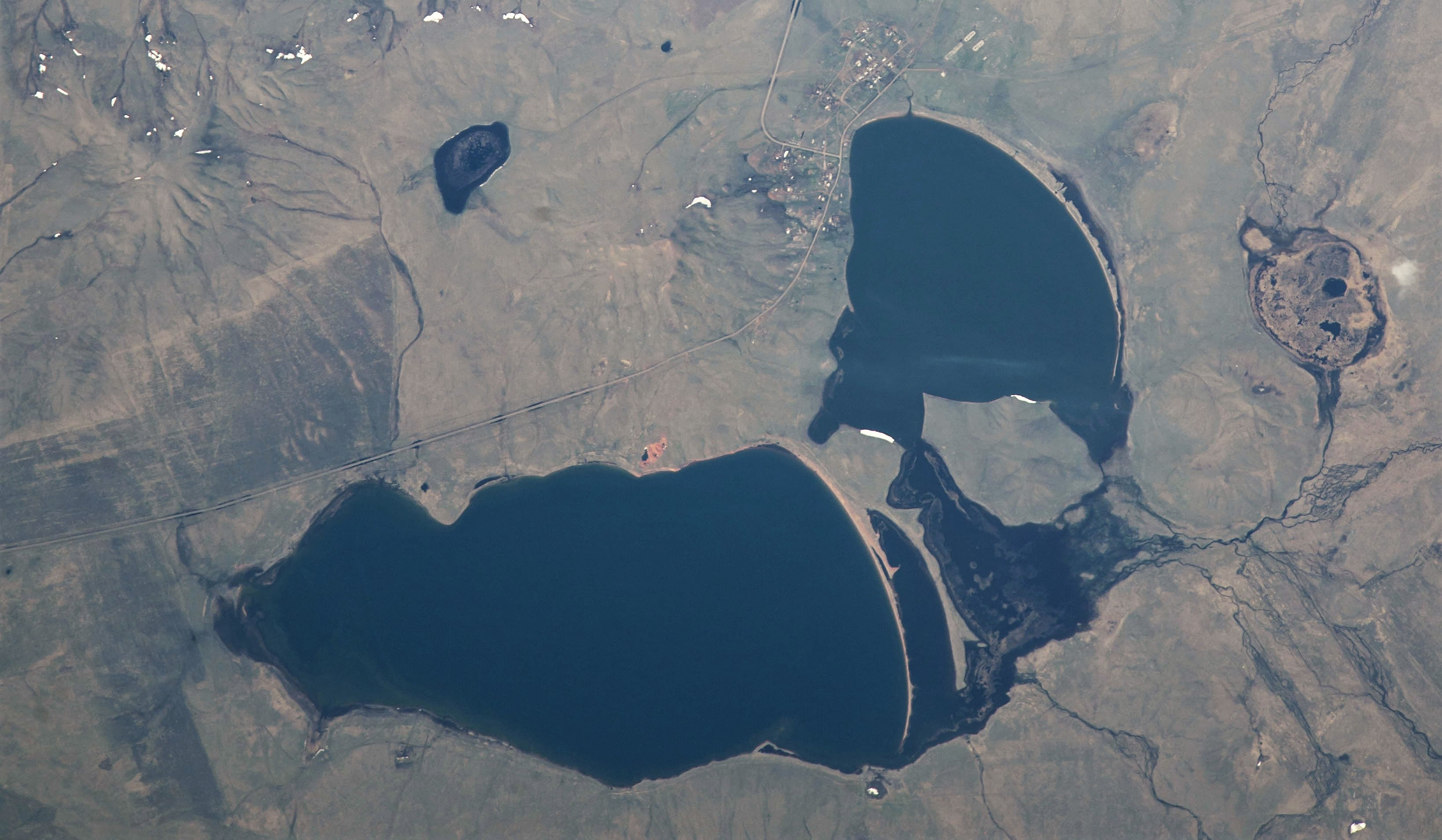
- ISS image of the lake

- Location within Kazakhstan
- Location: Kazakh Uplands
- Coordinates: 50.2257°N 74.863°E
- Type: endorheic
- Basin countries: Kazakhstan
- Max. length: 4.2 kilometers (2.6 mi)
- Max. width: 2.4 kilometers (1.5 mi)
- Surface area: 6.5 square kilometers (2.5 sq mi)
- Average depth: 4.5 meters (15 ft)
- Max. depth: 8.5 meters (28 ft)
- Residence time: UTC+6

Rudnichnoye (Kazakh: Рудничное), also known as Shalkarkol (Kazakh: Шалқаркөл), is a lake in Bukhar-Zhyrau District, Karaganda Region, and Bayanaul District, Pavlodar Region, Kazakhstan.

Rudnichnoye is located about 3 kilometers (1.9 mi) northeast of Semizbughy village. Shalkar village (formerly "Pobeda"), lies close to the lakeshore at the northern end. The lake and its surroundings are a destination for tourists.

== Geography ==
Rudnichnoye is an endorheic lake lying in the Kazakh Uplands, about 20 kilometers (12 mi) to the north of the northern slopes of the Ayr Mountains. It consists of a larger western lake and a smaller eastern one, separated by a double landspit and a peninsula, and connected by a sound. The water is brackish and hard. The highest level of the lake is in April, following the melting of the snow, and the lowest after the summer, in September.

The border between Karaganda Region and Pavlodar Region cuts across Rudnichnoye's northwestern tip. Smaller lake Kandykol lies 10 kilometers (6.2 mi) to the WNW, and Saumalkol almost 30 kilometers (19 mi) to the SW. 1,049 meters (3,442 ft) high mount Semizbughy rises to the south, above the southern shore of the lake.

== Flora and fauna ==
The lake has few aquatic plants; the main fish species in its waters are perch, pike, karabalik and carp.

== See also ==
- List of lakes of Kazakhstan
