= Ğafur Qalbyūly =

Kazakh Biy

Ğafur Qalbyūly Ғафур Қалбыұлы
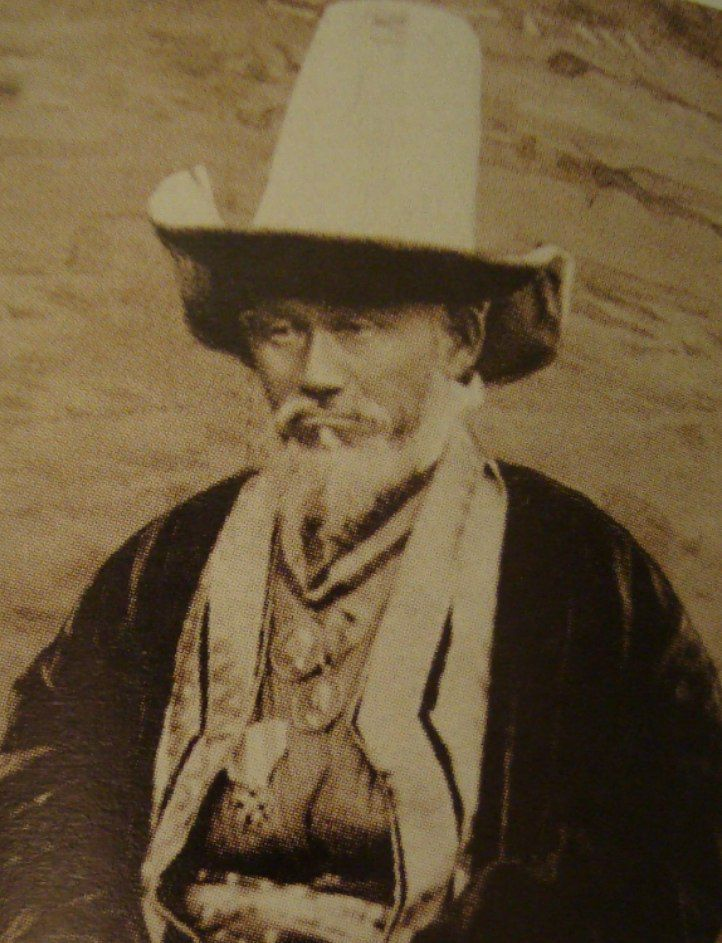

Ruler of the low Aday Kazakhs
- In office 1866–1867

Personal details
- Born: 1827 modern Mangystau
- Died: 1880 (aged 52–53) Russian Empire, modern Turkmenistan

Ğafur Qalbyūly (Kazakh: Ғафур Қалбыұлы, romanized: Ğafur Qalbyūly) was a Kazakh Biy, negotiator, one of the leaders of 1870 Aday revolt.

== Biography ==
In 1866-1867 Qalbyūly led the low Adai clan. He negotiated with the Khanate of Khiva on peaceful coexistence and trade. In 1870 participated in the Aday revolt and tried to rely on the help of their Khan (Muhammad Rahim Khan II of Khiva) in the fight against the Russian Empire. Khiva didn't provide assistance. When the revolt was suppressed, Ğafur with other leaders of the uprising returned to the Khanate of Khiva. In 1873 this territory was conquered by Russia, Russians pardoned Ğafur. They considered him a prominent leader of the Aday clan, and didn't want to turn the people against them. Ğafur, being elected to this position, preached Islam in the region and supervised the construction of mosques. He demanded from the regional government that the Kazakhs fish in the Caspian Sea under the same conditions as the Russians, it was fulfilled. Qalbyūly supported various scientific expeditions that came to Mangystau. Suddenly died in 1880 during a duty journey to Ashgabat. His body was brought to his homeland in Mangystau and buried in Qaraşajy. In 1999, the descendants of Qalbyūly built a mausoleum in his cemetery.
