= Töle Biy =

Töle biy Älibekūly
- Төле би Әлібекұлы
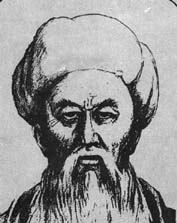

Head Biy of the Kazakh Khanate
- In office 1743–1749 Serving with Qazybek Biy and Äiteke Biy
- Monarch: Tauke Khan

Personal details
- Born: c. 1663 Köktuma Tract, Kazakh Khanate (now Jaysan, Shu District, Jambyl Region)
- Died: 1756 (aged 92–93) Aqburkhan-orda, Kazakh Khanate (now Tole Bi District, South Kazakhstan Region)
- Resting place: Qaldirg'ochbiy Mausoleum, Tashkent, Uzbekistan
- Citizenship: Kazakh Khanate
- Parent: Älibek Biy

Töle Biy Älibekūly (toe-LAY BEE), known mononymously as Töle Biy (Kazakh: Төле би Әлібекұлы, Töle bi Älıbekūly; c. 1663 – 1756), was the head biy of the Kazakh senior juz, as well as an author, orator, poet, politician and a public figure. He was born in Jaysan in what is now Shu District, Jambyl Region in 1663.

== Biography ==
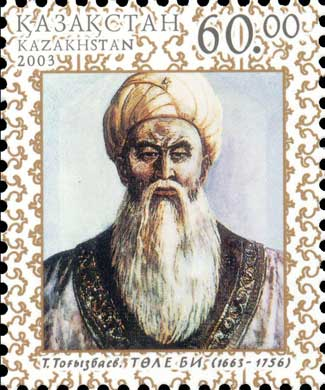
Fantasy portrait of Töle Biy on a Kazakhstani stamp, 2008

Töle Biy comes from the Kazakh tribe Dulat, subtribe Zhanys, in the family of Alibek Biy. Alibek Biy's father, Qudaiberdy Biy was a Khan adviser of Esim Khan and took part in the battle "Qataghan Qyrghyny" (lit. "Massacre of the Qataghan") (1627–1628), against the rebellious Khan Tursyn, then ruler of Tashkent. Töle was born in the Shu District.

In one of his works, Bukhar-zhirau tells about the childhood of Ablai Khan, where he would work for Abilmambet and look after Töle's sheep. In the "Sabalaq" poem, Bukhar-zhirau writes about dialogues Töle and Ablai would have. Töle Biy even had a nickname for Ablai, "Sabalaq", for his overgrown hair and disheveled appearance. This is a sign that Töle was one of the first people to know "Sabalaq" was a boy with a bright future.

Töle was well-respected for his deep knowledge and wisdom. There is a citation describing Tole: "A wise thought has a source, and its author is spiritual father Maiky". Some believed he gained Maiky Biy's spirit. Töle was often described as the one everyone could rely on, his wisdom was also noted by such Zhiraus as Synyr-Zhyrau and Zhirenshi.

The wise eloquent words, proverbs and sayings are widespread in the country. Folklorists and historians collected and studied about the life of Tole bi and his role in governing the country. That includes Shoqan Walikhanov, Alexey Lyovshin, Grigory Potanin, Аbubakir Divayev and Baltabai Adambayev, and others. The Manuscripts Fund of the State Archives of Kazakhstan and the Academy of Sciences also contains materials collected from around the country. There is still a lot of Tole Biy heritage that has not been written down or collected.

In 1740, escaping from the Dzungar invasion, he fled with all his relatives to Abd al-Karim Biy (Kokand Khanate). The Dzungar leader Galdan Tseren demanded to hand him over, but Abd al-Karim Biy chased away the Dzungar ambassadors.

After the death of Zholbarys, Khan of the Senior juz, Töle Biy ruled Tashkent for six years – from 1743 to 1749.

== Monuments ==
Töle Bi actively participated in the construction of public buildings in the cities of Shymkent, Turkistan (city), and Tashkent. Among the people, he is known as “Karlygash Äulie” (Swallow Saint) or “Karlygash Bi.” There is even a legend explaining why he was given this name. Töle Bi was buried in the Shaikhantaur Cemetery in Tashkent, near the mausoleum of Yunus Khan, the maternal grandfather of Babur. A mausoleum was built over his grave.

Many poets and storytellers have honored the wise figure of Töle Bi, making his wisdom the subject of their works. In past centuries, Russian researchers such as A. Levshin, P. Makovetsky, and L. Baluev, among others, expressed their respect for Töle Bi in their writings. Over time, Kazakh scholars and writers, including Mäshhür Jüsip Köpeev, Shäkärim Qudayberdiuly, Saken Seifullin, Mukhtar Auezov, B. Adambaev, and N. Törequlov, have published research and reflections on Töle Bi's legacy.

A settlement in Jambyl Region bears his name, and a district in Turkistan Region is named after him. Monuments to Töle Bi have been erected in Jambyl Region and Turkistan Region regions, as well as in Astana. Additionally, streets named after Töle Bi can be found inAlmaty, Shymkent, and several other localities.
