= Semizbughy (village) =

Semizbughy Семізбұғы
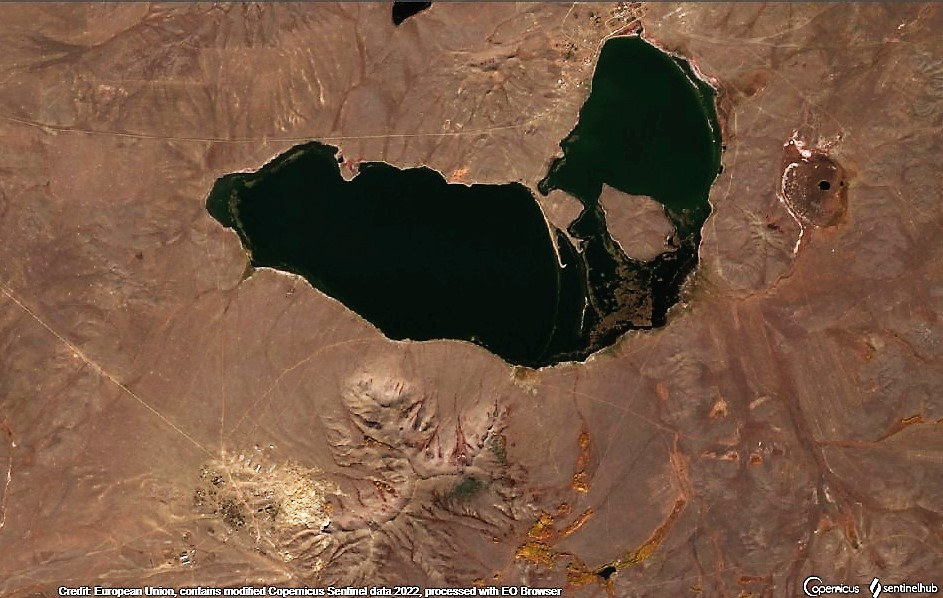
- Sentinel-2 image of Rudnichnoye lake and Semizbughy village in the lower left

- Location in Kazakhstan
- Coordinates: 50°11′46″N 74°49′44″E
- Country: Kazakhstan
- Region: Karaganda Region
- District: Bukhar-Zhyrau District

Population (2009)
  - Total: 136
- Time zone: UTC+6

Semizbughy (Kazakh: Семізбұғы; Russian: Семизбуга) is a village in the Karaganda Region, Kazakhstan. It is part of the Bukhar-Zhyrau rural district (KATO code - 354043200). The village was developed for the operation of a Corundum mine in the Semizbughy mountain. Population: 136 (2009 census results); 236 (1999 census results).

== Geography ==
Semizbughy is located just below the western slopes of Semizbughy mountain. 80 kilometers (50 mi) to the east of the village lies Botakara, the district center.
