= Auliye =

Mountain in Kazakhstan

- Әулие
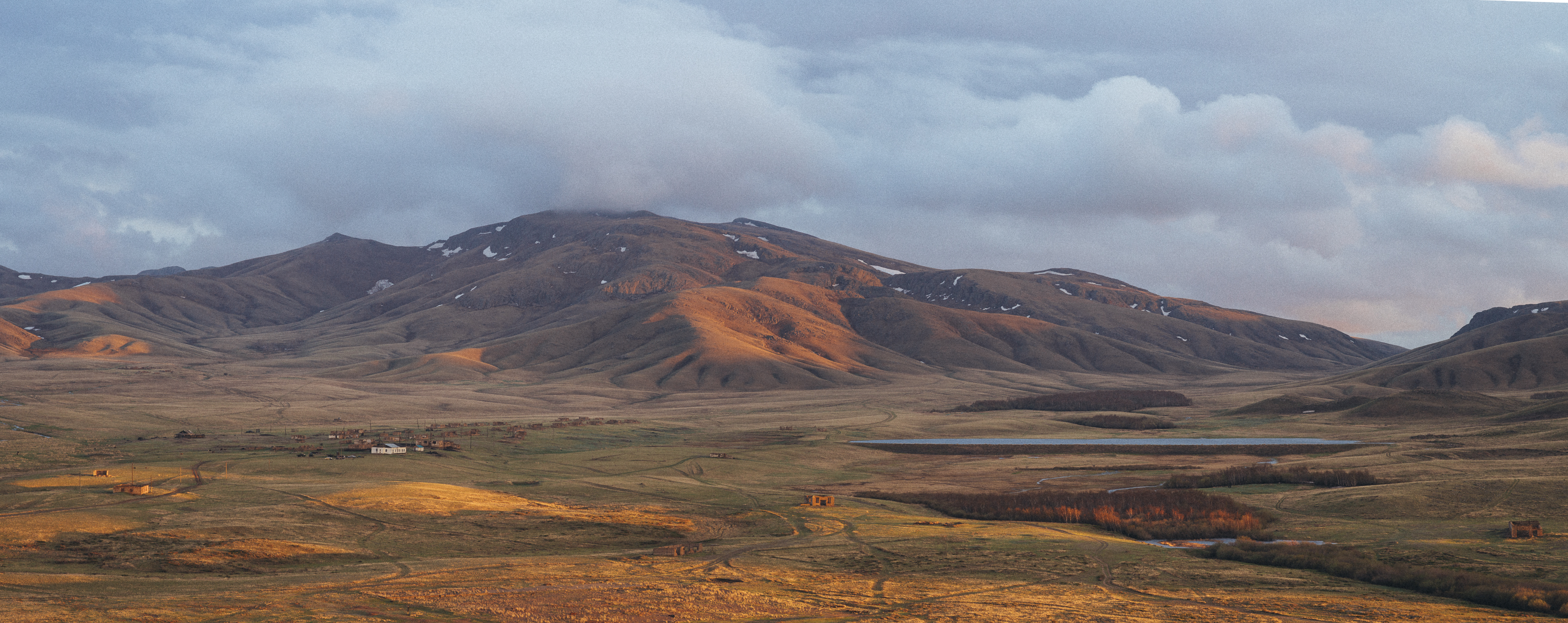
- Auliye mountain

Highest point
- Elevation: 1,055 m (3,461 ft)
- Coordinates: 50°23′56″N 76°09′15″E

Geography
- Location within Kazakhstan
- Country: Kazakhstan
- Region: Pavlodar Region
- Parent range: Kyzyltau; Kazakh Uplands

Geology
- Rock age(s): Devonian, Permian
- Mountain type: Granite

Climbing
- Easiest route: From Yegindybulak

Auliye (Kazakh: Әулие; Russian: Аулиетас) is a mountain in Bayanaul District, Pavlodar Region, Kazakhstan.

== Geography ==
Auliye rises in the central/southern section of the Kyzyltau range, part of the Kazakh Uplands. With an elevation of 1,055 metres (3,461 ft), it is the highest summit of the range.

764 metres (2,507 ft) high Mount Karakuys rises further to the northwest.

== See also ==
- Geography of Kazakhstan
