= Semizbughy =

Mountain in Kazakhstan

- Семізбұғы
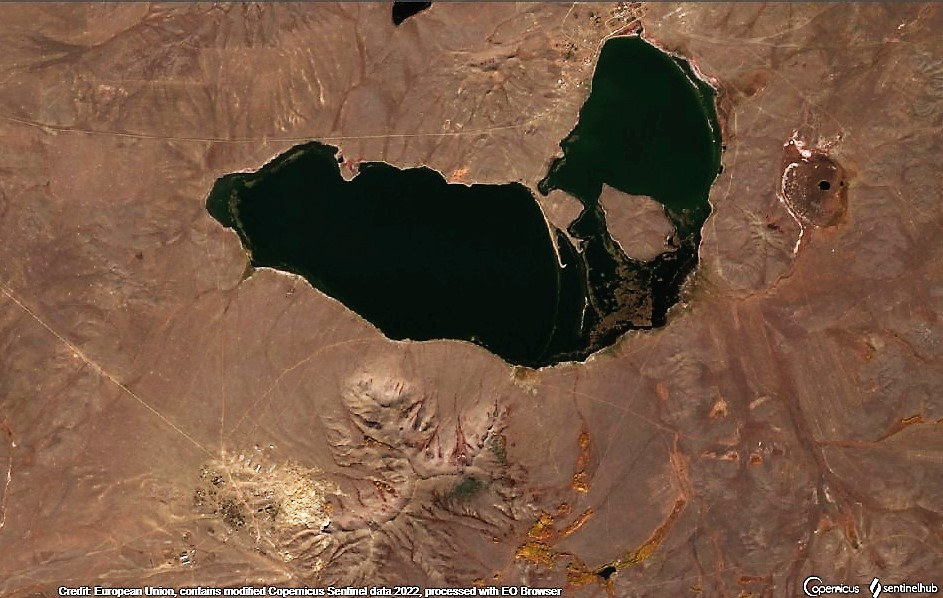
- Sentinel-2 image with Semizbughy mountain located to the south of Rudnichnoye lake

Highest point
- Elevation: 1,049 m (3,442 ft)
- Coordinates: 50°11′48″N 74°51′40″E

Dimensions
- Length: 7 km (4.3 mi) NW / SE
- Width: 4 km (2.5 mi) NE / SW

Geography
- Location within Kazakhstan
- Country: Kazakhstan
- Region: Karaganda Region
- Parent range: Kazakh Uplands

Geology
- Rock age: Devonian

Climbing
- Easiest route: From Semizhbughy village

Semizbughy (Kazakh: Семізбұғы) is a mountain massif in Bukhar-Zhyrau District, Karaganda Region, Kazakhstan.

Semizbughy is the highest point in the district. Semizhbugy mining village is located on the western side, at the foot of the mountain.

== Geography ==
Semizbughy is a small massif, part of the Kazakh Uplands. Its maximum length is 7 kilometres (4 mi) and its width 4 kilometres (2 mi). It has a gentle and smooth relief and rises above the southern shore of lake Rudnichnoye, to the north of the northwestern slopes of the Ayr Mountains. The highest summit of the range has an elevation of 1,049 metres (3,442 ft). River Ashchysu has its sources in the southern slopes of the range.

== Flora ==
The slopes of mount Semizbughy are covered with low vegetation, including sedges, alpine oatgrass and fescue.

== See also ==
- Geography of Kazakhstan
