= Ayr Mountains =

Range of mountains in Kazakhstan

- Айыр тауы
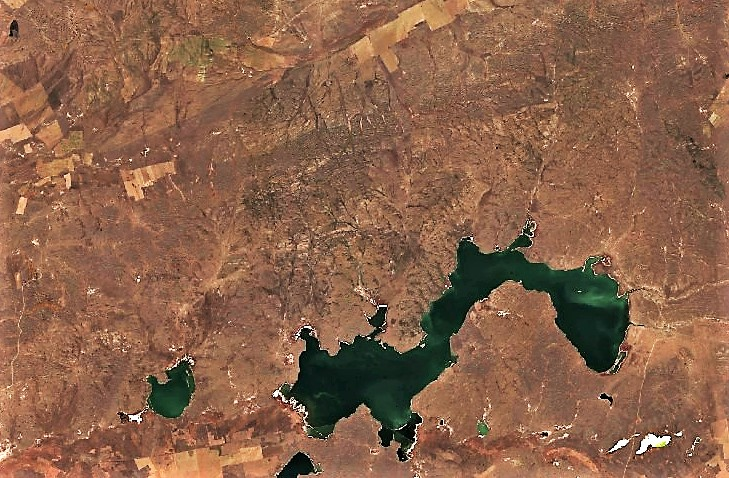
- The Ayr Mountains stretching to the north of lake Karasor Sentinel-2 image

Highest point
- Peak: Zhosaly
- Elevation: 871 m (2,858 ft)
- Coordinates: 49°53′56″N 74°48′52″E

Dimensions
- Length: 50 km (31 mi) NE / SW
- Width: 10 km (6.2 mi) NW / SE

Geography
- Location within Kazakhstan
- Location: Kazakhstan
- Range coordinates: 50°00′N 75°13′E
- Parent range: Kazakh Uplands

Geology
- Orogeny: Alpine orogeny
- Rock age(s): Devonian, Cambrian
- Rock type(s): Metamorphic rock, granite

The Ayr Mountains (Kazakh: Айыр тауы; Russian: Горы Айыр) are a mountain range in Karkaraly District, Karaganda Region, Kazakhstan.

The Pavlodar Region border stretches at the feet of the northern slopes of the range. The Zhosaly Sanatorium is located on the northwestern side of the highest mountain of the Ayr chain.

== Geography ==
The Ayr Mountains are part of the Kazakh Upland system (Saryarka). It is a range of moderate altitude located to the north of lakes Saumalkol and Karasor. The mountains mark the northern limit of the wide plain where Karasor and its neighboring lakes lie, stretching alongside the southern slopes of the range. The Zheltau range lies off the northeastern end of the range and the Kyzyltau further east. The Semizbughy rises to the north of the northwestern slopes.

The highest point of the Ayr chain is 871 meters (2,858 ft) high Zhosaly (Жосалы), located at the southwestern end. The soil of the mountains is dark brown. River Ashchysu has its sources in the range and flows below its northern slopes and river Ashchysu of the Nura basin, flows westwards to the north of the range.

== Flora ==
Steppe vegetation grows on the slopes, including wormwood, sedges, fescue and alpine oatgrass. In protected valleys there are clumps of birch, wild rose and hawthorn.

== See also ==
- Geography of Kazakhstan
