= Judge =

Person who is to make a decision in court based on the law

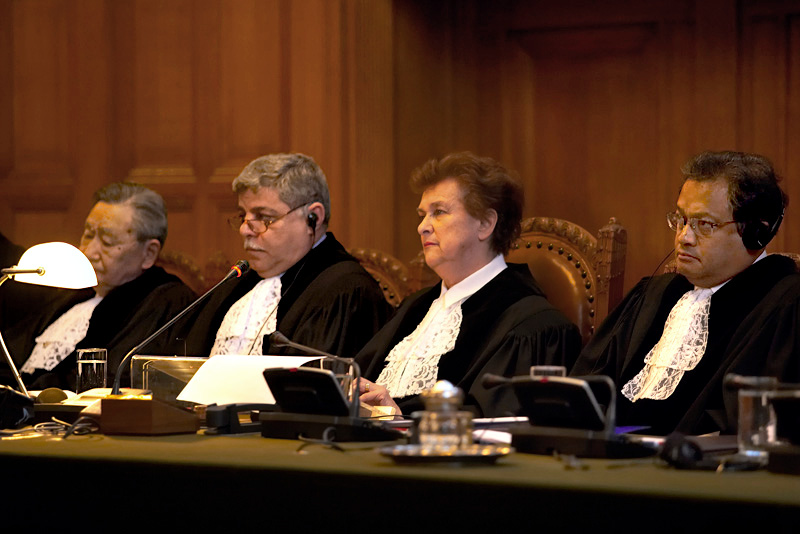
- Judges at the International Court of Justice

Occupation
- Names: Judge, justice, magistrate
- Occupation type: Profession
- Activity sectors: Law, Justice

Description
- Education required: University degree in law and experience as a lawyer
- Fields of employment: Courts
- Related jobs: Barrister, prosecutor

A judge is a public official who presides over court proceedings, either alone or as a part of a judicial panel. In an adversarial system, the judge hears all the witnesses and any other evidence presented by the barristers or solicitors of the case, assesses the credibility and arguments of the parties, and then issues a ruling in the case based on their interpretation of the law and their own personal judgment. A judge is expected to conduct the trial impartially and, typically, in an open court.

The powers, functions, method of appointment, discipline, and training of judges vary widely across different jurisdictions. In some jurisdictions, the judge's powers may be shared with a jury. In inquisitorial systems of criminal investigation, a judge might also be an examining magistrate. The presiding judge ensures that all court proceedings are lawful and orderly.

== Powers and functions ==
The ultimate task of a judge is to settle a legal dispute in a final and publicly lawful manner in agreement with substantial partialities. Judges exercise significant governmental power. Depending on their position and jurisdiction, they may be able to order police, military, or judicial officials to carry out searches, arrests, imprisonments, executions, garnishments, detentions, seizures, deportations, and similar actions. However, judges also supervise trial procedures to ensure consistency and impartiality and to reduce arbitrariness. A judge's powers are checked by higher courts, such as courts of appeal and supreme courts.

A criminal court usually has three main legally trained court officials: the judge, the prosecutor and the defence attorney. The role of a judge can vary between legal systems. In an adversarial system (common law), as in effect in the U.S. and England, the judge functions as an impartial referee, mainly ensuring correct procedure, while the prosecution and the defense present their case to a jury, often selected from common citizens. The main factfinder is the jury, and the judge will then finalize sentencing. Nevertheless, in smaller cases judges can issue summary judgments without proceeding to a jury trial. In an inquisitorial system (civil law), as in effect in continental Europe, there is no jury and the main factfinder is the judge, who will do the presiding, judging and sentencing on their own. As such, the judge is expected to apply the law directly, as in the French expression Le juge est la bouche de la loi ("The judge is the mouth of the law"). Furthermore, in some systems even investigations may be conducted by the judge, functioning as an examining magistrate.

Judges may work alone in smaller cases, but in criminal, family and other significant cases, they work in a panel. In some civil law systems, this panel may include lay judges. Unlike professional judges, lay judges are not legally trained, but unlike jurors, lay judges are usually volunteers and may be politically appointed. Judges are often assisted by law clerks, referendaries and notaries in legal cases and by bailiffs or similar with security.

=== Requirements and appointment ===
There are both volunteer and professional judges. A volunteer judge, such as an English magistrate, is not required to have legal training and is unpaid. Whereas, a professional judge is required to be legally educated; in the U.S., this generally requires a degree of Juris Doctor. Furthermore, significant professional experience is often required; for example, in the U.S., judges are often appointed from experienced attorneys.

Judges are often appointed in an indirect election. Obstructionism during the nomination process can result in a partisan imbalance in the share of judges. In some jurisdictions, judges are elected in a direct election.

=== Accountability ===
In many jurisdictions judicial independence to avoid partisan pressures is paired with mechanisms to prevent judicial activism or sentencing disparities. Judges can differ in their leniency. Harvard Law Review notes that judicial immunity with ineffectual judicial oversight results in lack of deterrence for judicial misconduct. Judicial retention elections can improve judicial accountability.

Impartiality is often considered important for rule of law. A study found in pivotal court cases the personal political ideology of judges motivates their decisions. In political questions judges can prevent political bias by deciding along the preferences of the median citizen.

=== Judge as an occupation ===
Judicial functions require the analysis of extensive documentation, witness testimony, and case materials, alongside a comprehensive understanding of legal procedure and statutory law. Professional responsibilities include decision-making based on logical reasoning and, in certain contexts, dispute resolution. Written decisions must adhere to formal legal standards of clarity and authority. Additionally, judicial candidates are typically subject to character and fitness evaluations. In the United States, judicial compensation varies by jurisdiction; the median salary for state judges is approximately $153,990 per annum, while federal judges earn between $249,990 and $320,700 per annum.

=== Gender identity ===
Women are overrepresented among the first instance judges in France, Greece, Hungary, Latvia, Luxembourg, Serbia, Slovenia, contributed by overrepresentation of women among law graduates. In contrast in UK, Ireland and the United States men are overrepresented among first instance judges. In the supreme courts of the United States and some European Union member-states women are underrepresented, except for France with gender parity in 2018 and Romania, where men are underrepresented.

=== Age and retirement ===
The term of office for judges varies. In the United States, federal judges are appointed "for good behavior", which means in practice, that federal judges have life tenure unless they voluntarily retire or are impeached. The death of Ruth Bader Ginsburg in the office in 2020 and suspension of Pauline Newman in 2023 reinvigorated the discussion about mandatory retirement age for federal judges, but such change would require a constitutional amendment and is unlikely to be implemented soon.

States have more flexibility in establishing a mandatory retirement age for judges, as was confirmed by the SCOTUS in its 1991 decision Gregory v. Ashcroft. As of 2015, 33 States and the District of Columbia had mandatory retirement ages for State court judges, which ranged from 70 to 75 for most (but is as high as 90 in Vermont). A 2020 study by the National Bureau of Economic Research found significant positive effects on the performance of state Supreme Courts with mandatory retirement age for judges. The authors advocated the adoption of mandatory retirement ages for all federal and state judges, although they felt, that the individual authorities should decide on the specific age for themselves.

=== Abbreviations ===
The abbreviation "JJ" or "JJ." is often used as an abbreviation for the plural form of judges or justices

In Australia, additional abbreviations used for various types of judges include:

- JJ (Justices)
- CJ (Chief Justice)
- ACJ (Acting Chief Justice)
- FM (Federal Magistrate)
- JA (Justice of Appeal)
- DCJ (District Court Judge)

== Symbols of office ==
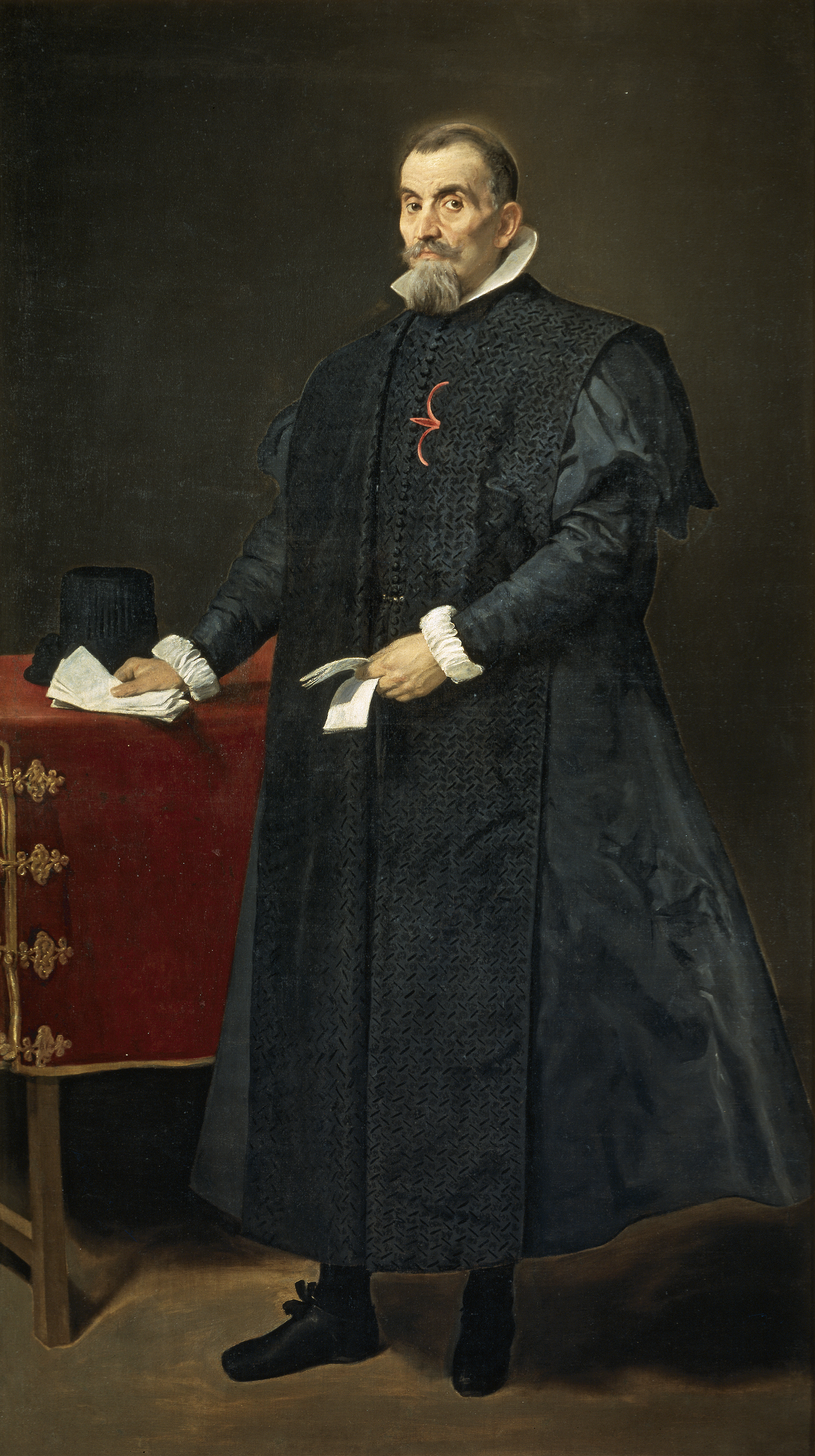
17th century Spanish judge in full gowns, by Velázquez

A variety of traditions have become associated with the rank or occupation. Gavels (a ceremonial hammer) are used by judges in many countries, to the point that the gavel has become a symbol of a judge. In many parts of the world, judges wear long robes (often in black or red) and sit on an elevated platform during trials (known as the bench).

American judges frequently wear black robes. American judges have ceremonial gavels, although American judges have court deputies or bailiffs and contempt of court power as their main devices to maintain decorum in the courtroom. However, in some of the Western United States, like California, judges did not always wear robes and instead wore everyday clothing. Today, some members of state supreme courts, such as the Maryland Supreme Court wear distinct dress. In Italy and Portugal, both judges and lawyers wear particular black robes.

In some countries, especially in the Commonwealth of Nations, judges wear wigs. The long wig often associated with judges is now reserved for ceremonial occasions, although it was part of the standard attire in previous centuries. A short wig resembling but not identical to a barrister's wig (a Bench Wig) would be worn in court. This tradition, however, is being phased out in Britain in non-criminal courts.

In Oman, the judge wears a long stripe (red, green white), while the attorneys wear the black gown.

In Portugal and in the former Portuguese Empire, the judges used to carry a staff that was red for ordinary judges and white for the judges from the outside.

== Titles and forms of address ==
=== Asia ===
==== Hong Kong ====
In Hong Kong, court proceedings are conducted in either English or Hong Kong Cantonese (a dialect of Yue Chinese). Judges of Hong Kong retain many of the English traditions such as wearing wigs and robes in trials.

In the lower courts, magistrates are addressed as Your worship, and district court judges as Your Honour.

In the superior courts of record, namely the Hong Kong Court of Final Appeal and the High Court of Hong Kong (which consists of the Court of Appeal and the Court of First Instance), judges are addressed as My Lord or My Lady and referred to as Your Lordship or Your Ladyship, following the English tradition.

In writing, the post-nominal letters PJ is used to refer to a permanent judge of the Court of Final Appeal and NPJ to a non-permanent judge. In the High Court, the abbreviation JA is used to denote a justice of appeal, and the letter J refers to a judge of the Court of First Instance.

Masters of the High Court are addressed as Master.

When trials are conducted in Chinese, judges were addressed, in Cantonese, as Fat Goon Dai Yan (Hong Kong Cantonese: 法官大人, romanized: faat3 gun1 daai6 jan4, lit. 'Judge, your lordship') before the transfer of sovereignty from the United Kingdom to China, and as Fat Goon Gok Ha (Hong Kong Cantonese: 法官閣下, romanized: faat3 gun1 gok3 haa6, lit. 'Judge, your honour') since 1997. Fat Goon (Hong Kong Cantonese: 法官, romanized: faat gun1, lit. 'Judge') means the word "judge".

==== India ====
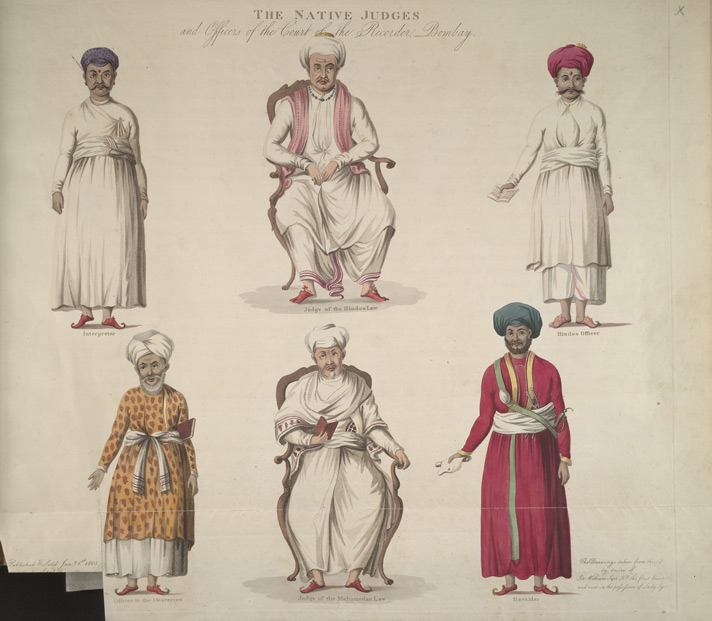
These drawings were taken from life in 1758. From left to right, top row: 1. Interpreter, Rhowangee Sewagee. 2. Judge of the Hindoo Law, Antoba Crustnagee Pundit. 3. Hindoo Officer, Lellather Chatta Bhutt. From left to right, bottom row: 4. Officer to the Mooremen, Mahmoud Ackram of the Codjee order or priesthood of the cast of Moormens. 5. Judge of the Mohomedan Law, Cajee Husson. 6. Haveldar, or summoning Officer, Mahmound Ismael'.

In India, judges of the Supreme Court and the High Courts were addressed as Your Lordship or My Lord and Your Ladyship or My Lady, a tradition directly attributable to England. The Bar Council of India had adopted a resolution in April 2006 and added a new Rule 49(1)(j) in the Advocates Act. As per the rule, lawyers can address the court as Your Honour and refer to it as Honourable Court. If it is a subordinate court, lawyers can use terms such as sir or any equivalent phrase in the regional language concerned. Explaining the rationale behind the move, the Bar Council had held that the words such as My Lord and Your Lordship were "relics of the colonial past". The resolution has since been circulated to all state councils and the Supreme Court for adoption but over five years now, the resolution largely remained on paper.

However, in an unprecedented move in October 2009, one of the judges of Madras HC, Justice K Chandru had banned lawyers from addressing his court as My Lord and Your Lordship.

==== Israel ====
In Israel, the judges (Hebrew: שופט, romanized: shofét, lit. 'judge') of all courts are addressed as Sir, Madam (Hebrew: אדוני/גבירתי, romanized: adoni/geverti) or Your Honor (Hebrew: כבודו/כבודה, romanized: kevodo/kevoda). Typically after every naming you will hear haShofét, meaning "the judge" after the respective address. For example, Your Honor the Judge would be כבוד השופט (kevod haShofét).

==== Kazakh Khanate ====
Biy - elected judges using adat Zheti Zhargy. The Council of biys was the highest council, a kind of senate.

==== Malaysia ====
In Malaysia, judges of the subordinate courts are addressed as Tuan or Puan ("Sir", "Madam"), or Your Honour. Judges of the superior courts are addressed as Yang Arif (lit. 'Learned One') or My Lord, My Lady, etc.; and Your Lordship or My Ladyship if the proceedings, as they generally are in the superior courts, are in English.

==== Pakistan ====
In Pakistan, judges of the Supreme Court and the High Courts are addressed as Your Lordship or My Lord or Lordship and Your Ladyship or My Lady, a tradition directly attributable to England. There is some resistance to this on religious grounds but more or less continues till this day. In lower courts, judges are addressed as sir, madam or the Urdu equivalent Janab or Judge Sahab.

==== Sri Lanka ====
In Sri Lanka, judges of most courts are addressed as Your Honour; however, the Chief Justice is addressed as Your Lordship. Judges of the Supreme Court and the Appeal Court receives the title The Honourable.

==== Vietnam ====
Judges in Vietnam are addressed as Quý tòa (literally the "Honorable Court").

=== Europe ===
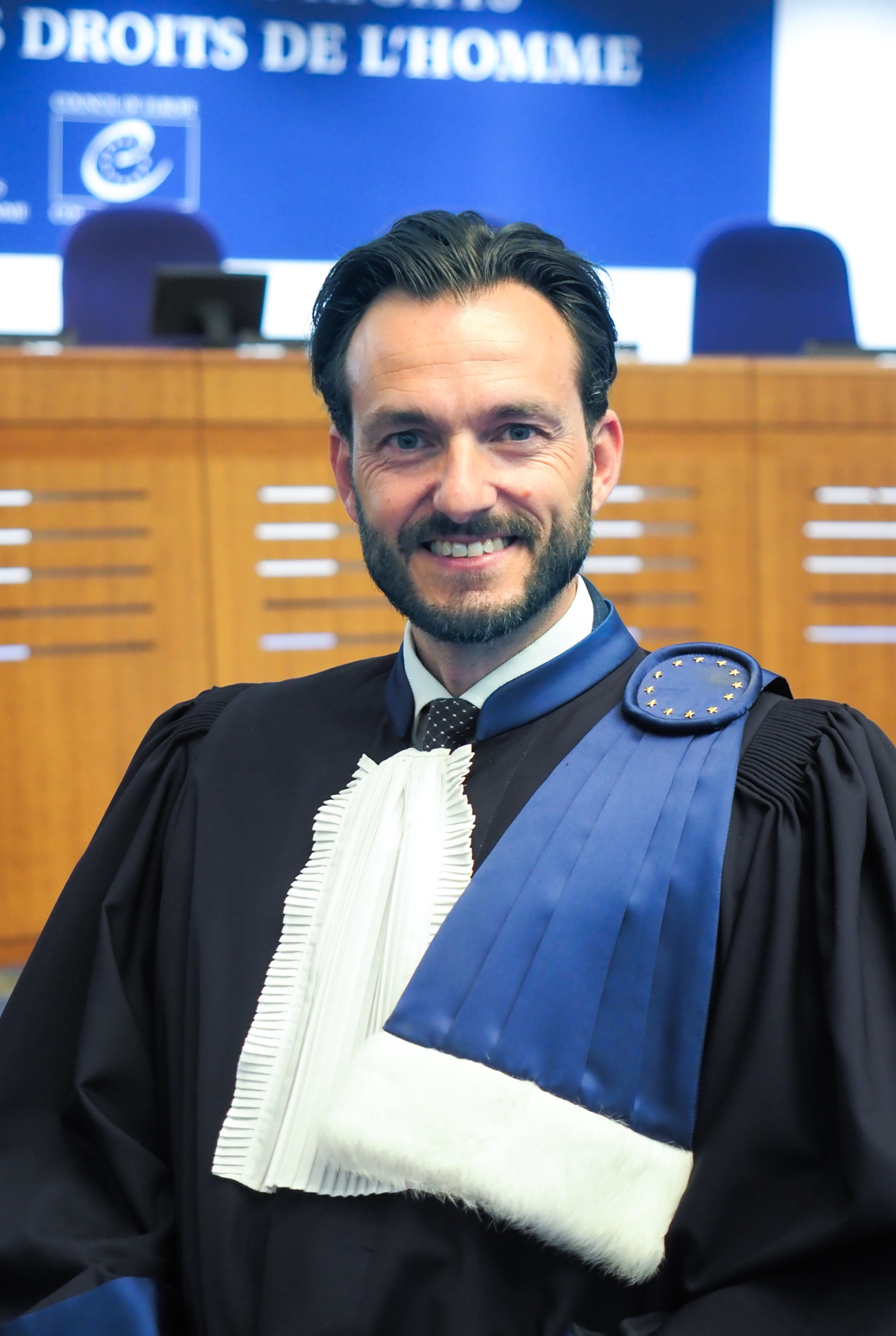
Róbert Ragnar Spanó, president of the European Court of Human Rights

==== Bulgaria ====
In Bulgaria before 1989, during the communist regime, judges were addressed as drugarju (Bulgarian: другарю, lit. 'comrade'). After 1989, gospodín sŭdiya (Bulgarian: господин съдия, lit. 'mister judge') or gospožo sŭdiya (Bulgarian: госпожо съдия, lit. 'madam judge') are used.

==== Finland ====
There is no special form of address; ordinary politeness is sufficient and the procedure lacks arcane rituals. Accordingly, the chairman of the panel is addressed as herra/rouva puheenjohtaja ("Mr./Ms. Chairman"). Finnish judges use gavels, but there are no robes or cloaks used in any Finnish courts.

In a district court (käräjäoikeus), ordinary judges work with the title käräjätuomari and the chairman is laamanni (lawspeaker). They are assisted by notaries (notaari), assessors (asessori) and referendaries (viskaali) who may sometimes even chair sessions. In appeals courts (hovioikeus) an ordinary judge has the title hovioikeudenneuvos, the chairman of a section is hovioikeudenlaamanni and the court is led by a presidentti. In the Supreme Court, judges are titled oikeusneuvos and the court is led by a presidentti.

==== France ====
In France, the presiding judge of a court is addressed as Monsieur le président or Madame le président, whilst associated judges are addressed as Monsieur l'Assesseur or Madame l'Assesseur. Out of the courtroom, judges are referred to as Monsieur le juge or Madame le juge.

==== Germany ====
In Germany, judges are addressed as Herr Vorsitzender or Frau Vorsitzende, which translate as "Mister Chairman" and "Madam Chairwoman", or as Hohes Gericht, which translates as "High Court".

==== Hungary ====
The male presiding judge of a court is addressed as tisztelt bíró úr, which means "Honourable Mister Judge" and a female presiding judge is addressed as tisztelt bírónő, which means "Honourable Madam Judge". The court as a body can be addressed as tisztelt bíróság, which means "Honourable Court".

==== Ireland ====
Judges of the Supreme Court, Court of Appeal, or High Court are officially titled The Honourable Mr/Mrs/Ms/Miss Justice Surname (Irish: An Breitheamh Onórach Uasal [surname]), and informally referred to for short as Mr/Mrs/Ms/Miss Justice Surname. In court, they are addressed either by their respective titles or styles, as The Court (An Chúirt), or simply Judge (A Bhreithimh). In law reports, the Chief Justice of Ireland has the postnominal CJ, the Presidents of the other Courts have the postnominal P, and all other judges J, e.g. Smith J.

Judges of the Circuit Court are titled His/Her Honour Judge Surname and are addressed in Court as Judge. Before 2006, they were addressed as My Lord (A thiarna) .

Judges of the District Court are titled Judge Surname and addressed in Court as Judge. Before 1991 these judges were known as District Justices and addressed as Your Worship (d'Onóra).

==== Italy ====
In Italy, the presiding judge of a court is addressed as Signor/Signora presidente della corte (Sir/Madame president of the court) or Vostro Onore (Your Honour).

==== Netherlands ====
In the Netherlands, presiding judges of either sex are, in writing only, addressed edelachtbare ("Your Honour") for judges in the Court of First Instance, edelgrootachtbare ("Your Great Honour") for justices in the Court of Appeal and edelhoogachtbare ("Your High Honour") for justices in the High Council of the Netherlands (Supreme Court).

==== Poland ====
In Poland, presiding judges of either sex during trial are addressed Wysoki Sądzie ("High Court").

==== Portugal ====
In Portugal, presiding judges during trial are addressed as Meretíssimo Juiz when a man or Meretíssima Juíza when a woman (meaning "Most Worthy Judge") or as Vossa Excelência ("Your Excellency") when not specifying gender.

==== Romania ====
In Romania, judges during trial are addressed as Onorata Instanta (Your Honor).

==== Russia ====
In Russia, Vasha Chest (Russian: Ваша Честь, lit. 'Your Honour') is used for criminal cases only with the one judge presiding. For civil, commercial and criminal cases presided over by a panel of judges the right address is Honorable Court.

==== Spain ====
In Spain, magistrates of the Supreme Court, magistrates and judges are addressed to as "Your Lordship" (Su Señoría); however, in formal occasions, magistrates of the Supreme Court are addressed to as "Your Most Excellent Lordship" (Vuestra Señoría Excelentísima or Excelentísimo Señor/Excelentísima Señora); in those solemn occasions, magistrates of lower Courts are addressed as "Your Most Illustrious Lordship" (Vuestra Señoría Ilustrísima or Ilustrísimo Señor/Ilustrísima Señora); simple judges are always called "Your Lordship".

==== Sweden ====
In Sweden, the presiding judge of a court is traditionally addressed as Herr Ordförande or Fru Ordförande, which translate as "Mister Chairman" and "Madam Chairwoman".

==== United Kingdom ====
===== England and Wales =====
In the Courts of England and Wales, Supreme Court judges are called Justices of the Supreme Court. Justices of the Supreme Court who do not hold life peerages are now given the courtesy style "Lord" or "Lady". Justices of the Supreme Court are addressed as "My Lord/Lady" in court. In the law reports, the Justices of the Supreme Court are usually referred to as "Lord/Lady N", although the Weekly Law Reports appends the post-nominal letters "JSC" (e.g. "Lady Smith JSC"). The President and Deputy President of the Court are afforded the post-nominal letters PSC and DPSC respectively. Only experienced barristers or solicitors are usually appointed as judges.

Judges of the High Court and Court of Appeal are addressed (when sitting in those courts) as "My Lord" or "My Lady" and referred to as "Your Lordship" or "Your Ladyship".

Judges of the Court of Appeal, also called Lords Justice of Appeal, are referred to as "Lord Justice N" or "Lady Justice N". In legal writing, Lords Justices of Appeal are afforded the post nominal letters "LJ": for example, Smith LJ.

When a Justice of the High Court who is not present is being referred to they are described as "Mr./Mrs./Ms. Justice N." In legal writing, the post-nominal letter "J" is used to denote a Justice (male or female) of the High Court; for example, a Justice Smith is referred to as Smith J. Unlike American English, no comma is used to offset the letter J from the Justice's name. The full stop after the preceding examples terminates the sentence, not the abbreviation, and the abbreviation can be used mid-sentence in prose in formal legal writing. Masters of the High Court are addressed as "Master". Insolvency and Companies Court judges in the High Court are addressed as "Judge".

Circuit judges and recorders are addressed as "Your Honour". Circuit judges are referred to as "His/Her Honour Judge N". In writing, this title is occasionally abbreviated as "HHJ" or "HH Judge N", but not in legal writing. District judges and tribunal judges are addressed as "Judge".

Magistrates are usually still addressed as "Your Worship" in much of England. Magistrates are also addressed as "Sir/Madam".

===== Scotland =====
In the Courts of Scotland judges in the Court of Session, High Court of Justiciary and the sheriff courts are all addressed as "My Lord" or "My Lady" and referred to as "Your Lordship" or "Your Ladyship".

Justices of the peace in justice of the peace courts are addressed and referred to as "Your Honour".

===== Northern Ireland =====
The judicial system of Northern Ireland is very similar to that of England and Wales, and superior court judges are addressed the same way as those in England and Wales. However, there are a few differences at the lower levels.

In Northern Ireland, the equivalent to a circuit judge is a county court judge, and they are addressed and titled the same way as a circuit judge is in England and Wales. The senior county court judges assigned to the county court divisions of Belfast and Derry have the titles of Recorder of Belfast and Recorder of Londonderry (or Derry) respectively, but are addressed the same as other county court judges. A district judge sitting in the County Court is addressed as "Your Honour".

A district judge (magistrates' court) is addressed as "Your Worship". A lay magistrate, in cases where they are present, is also addressed as "Your Worship", and may use the post-nominals "LM", e.g. "John Smith LM".

=== North America ===
==== Canada ====
In general, Canadian judges may be addressed directly, depending on the province, as "My Lord", "My Lady", "Your Honour" or "Justice" and are formally referred to in the third person as "The Honourable Mr. (or Madam) Justice 'Forename Surname'". Less formally, judges of a Superior Court are referred to as "Justice 'Surname'", not as "Judge 'Surname.'" When referred to in a decision of a court, judges' titles are often abbreviated to the suffix "J.", so that Justice Smith will be referred to as Smith J. Judges in some superior courts are addressed as "My Lord" or "My Lady". In Ontario, judges are rarely referred to as "My Lord" or "My Lady", but only as "Your Honour" at the Ontario Superior Court of Justice. Formerly, translations of these titles such as Votre Honneur ("your honour") or Votre Seigneurie ("your lordship") were used in French; today, only Monsieur le juge and Madame la juge are officially used. Both the titles "judge" and "justice" are translated juge.

Generally, it is only appropriate to use the term "judge" when speaking of an anonymous or general position, such as "the trial judge", or when referring to a member of an inferior or provincial court such as the Ontario Court of Justice. The exception is Citizenship Judges who are referred to only as "Judge 'Surname'" in accordance with their appointment as independent decision makers of the Citizenship Commission.

Like other members of the Commonwealth, a justice of the peace is addressed as "Your Worship", and a Master of a Superior Court is referred to as "Master". As of December 7, 2018, Ontario Court Masters are addressed in English as "Your Honour" and in French as "Votre Honneur" and no longer as "Master".

==== United States ====
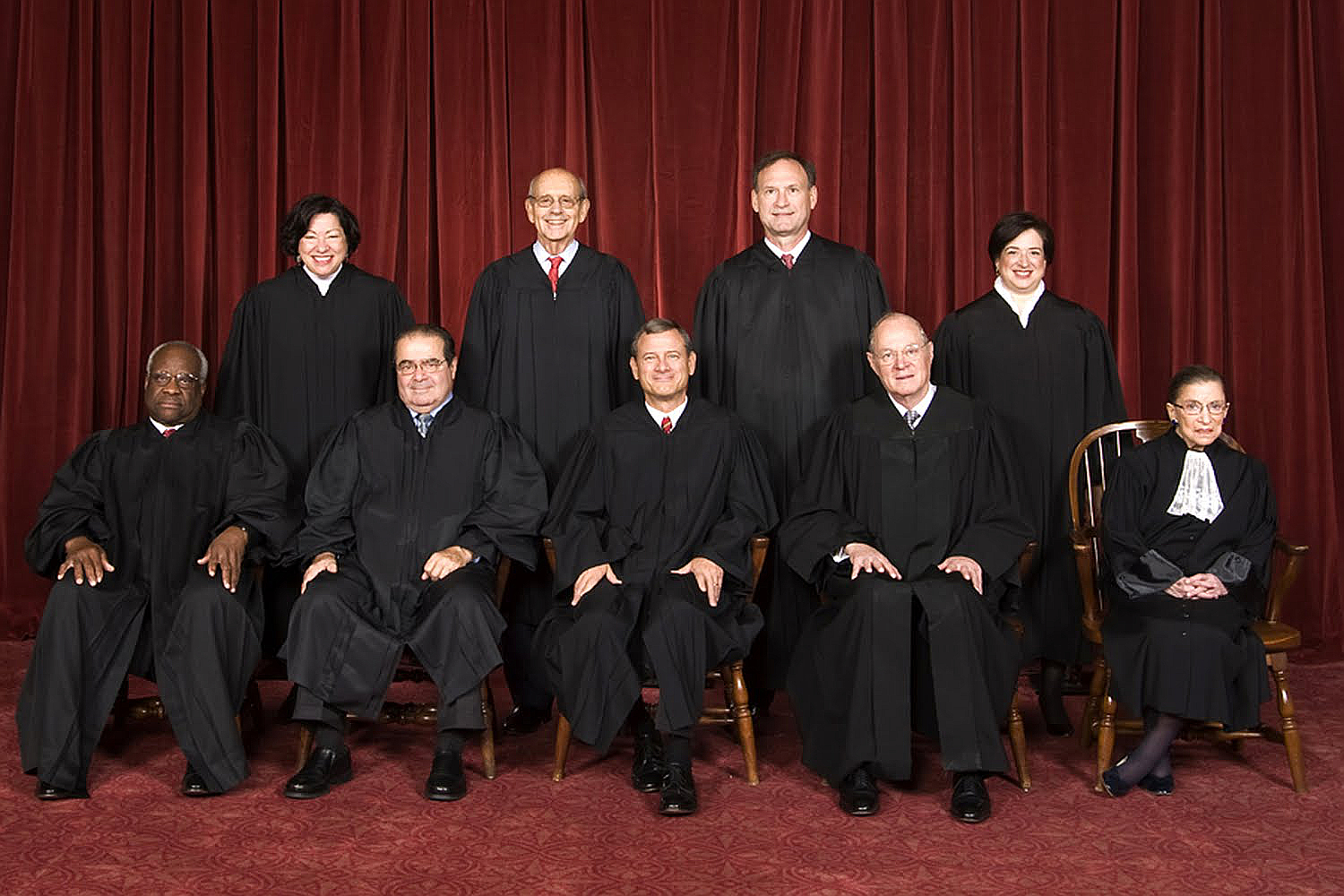
The United States Supreme Court in 2010

In many states throughout the United States, a judge is addressed as "Your Honor" or "Judge" when presiding over the court. "Judge" may be more commonly used by attorneys and staff, while either may be commonly used by the plaintiff or defendant. Notably, the Superior Court of Los Angeles County, the largest unified trial court in the United States, has a rule that the judge shall be addressed only as "Your Honor" while in court, and never as "Judge", "Judge (name)", "ma'am", or "sir". This is somewhat unusual as "Judge" and "Judge (name)" or similar forms of address are considered appropriate and respectful in many other courts.

The judges of the Supreme Court of the United States, and the judges of the supreme courts of several U.S. states and other countries are called "justices". Justices of the Supreme Court of the United States and Justices of other courts are addressed as "Justice (name)". The Chief Justice of the United States is formally addressed as "Mr. or Madam Chief Justice" but also may be identified and addressed as "Chief Justice (name)".

Regardless of the specific term employed (judge or justice), the formal title is reduced to the postnominal abbreviation "J." in case citations and certain case law reporters when it is necessary to identify the author of a cited opinion. In American English, the postnominal "J." is always divided from the judge's name by a comma and a space, so that a citation to a dissenting opinion by Associate Justice Antonin Scalia would warn that the cited opinion is not the majority opinion with the parenthetical notation "Scalia, J., dissenting". The plural form is JJ. Unlike British English, this abbreviation style is used only in case citations, and is not used mid-sentence in regular prose (as distinguished from case citations dropped into sentences as parentheticals). Thus, a prose sentence discussing the actual contents of a dissenting opinion right before a case citation to that opinion would refer to the reasoning of "Justice Scalia", not "Scalia, J."

The justices of the supreme courts usually hold higher offices than any other judges in a jurisdiction, including a justice of the peace, a judge who holds police court in some jurisdictions and who may also try small claims and misdemeanors. However, the State of New York inverts this usual order. The initial trial court in this state is called the Supreme Court of New York, and its judges are called "justices". The next highest appellate court is the Supreme Court, Appellate Division, whose judges are also called "justices". However, the highest court in New York is called the New York Court of Appeals, whose members are called "judges".

Judges in certain jurisdictions, such as New York and New Jersey, who deal with guardianships, trusts and estates are known as "surrogates".

A senior judge, in American practice, is a retired judge who handles selected cases for a governmental entity while in retirement, on a part-time basis.

Subordinate or inferior jurisdiction judges in American legal practice are sometimes called magistrates, although in the federal judiciary of the United States, they are called magistrate judges. Subordinate judges in American legal practice who are appointed on an ad hoc case-by-case basis, particularly in cases where a great deal of detailed and tedious evidence must be reviewed, are often called "masters" or "special masters".

Judges of courts of specialized jurisdiction (such as bankruptcy courts or juvenile courts) were sometimes known officially as "referees", but the use of this title is in decline. Judges sitting in courts of equity in common law systems (such as judges in the equity courts of Delaware) are called "chancellors".

Individuals with judicial responsibilities who report to an executive branch official, rather than being a part of the judiciary, are often called "administrative law judges" (ALJs) in American practice. Historically, such officials were previously known as hearing examiners or referees before American English settled on the ALJ title. They commonly make initial determinations regarding matters such as workers' compensation, eligibility for government benefits, regulatory matters, and immigration determinations.

Judges who derive their authority from a contractual agreement of the parties to a dispute, rather than a governmental body, are called arbitrators. They typically do not receive the honorific forms of address nor do they bear the symbolic trappings of a publicly appointed judge. However, it is now common for many retired judges to serve as arbitrators, and they will often write their names as if they were still judges, with the parenthetical "(Ret.)" for "Retired".

Unlike many civil law countries which have some courts on which panels of judges with nearly equal status composed of both legally trained professional judges and lay judges who lack legal training and are not career judges, the United States legal system (like most Anglo-American legal systems) makes a clear distinction between professional judges and laypeople involved in deciding a case who are jurors who are part of a jury. Most but not all American judges have professional credentials as lawyers. Non-lawyer judges in the United States are often elected and are typically either justices of the peace or part-time judges in rural limited jurisdiction courts. A non-lawyer judge typically has the same rights and responsibilities as a lawyer who is a judge holding the same office and is addressed in the same manner.

=== Oceania ===
==== Australia ====
In Australia judges and, since 2007, magistrates, of all jurisdictions including the High Court of Australia are now addressed as "Your Honour". In legal contexts, they are referred to as "His/Her Honour" and "the Honourable Justice Surname" (for judges of superior courts) or "his/her Honour Judge Surname" (for inferior courts). Outside legal contexts, the formal terms of address are "Judge" (for puisne justices) or "Chief Justice" (for chief justices).

The title for most puisne judges is "Justice", which is abbreviated in law reports to a postnominal "J", in the form "Surname J". Chief Justices of the High Court and of state Supreme Courts are titled "Chief Justice", which is abbreviated in law reports to a postnomial "CJ". Judges in State Supreme Courts with a separate Court of Appeal division (New South Wales, Victoria, Queensland and Western Australia) are referred to as Justices/Judges of the Appeal (abbreviated "Surname JA"), while the President of the Court of Appeal is referred to as "President" (abbreviated "Surname P").

==== New Zealand ====
In New Zealand, judges of the District Court of New Zealand generally referred to as "His/Her Honour" or "Sir/Madame". Judges from the High Court, Appeals Court, and Supreme Court are referred to as "Justice [Surname]". In social settings, it is appropriate to use "Judge" in all cases.

=== South America ===
==== Brazil ====
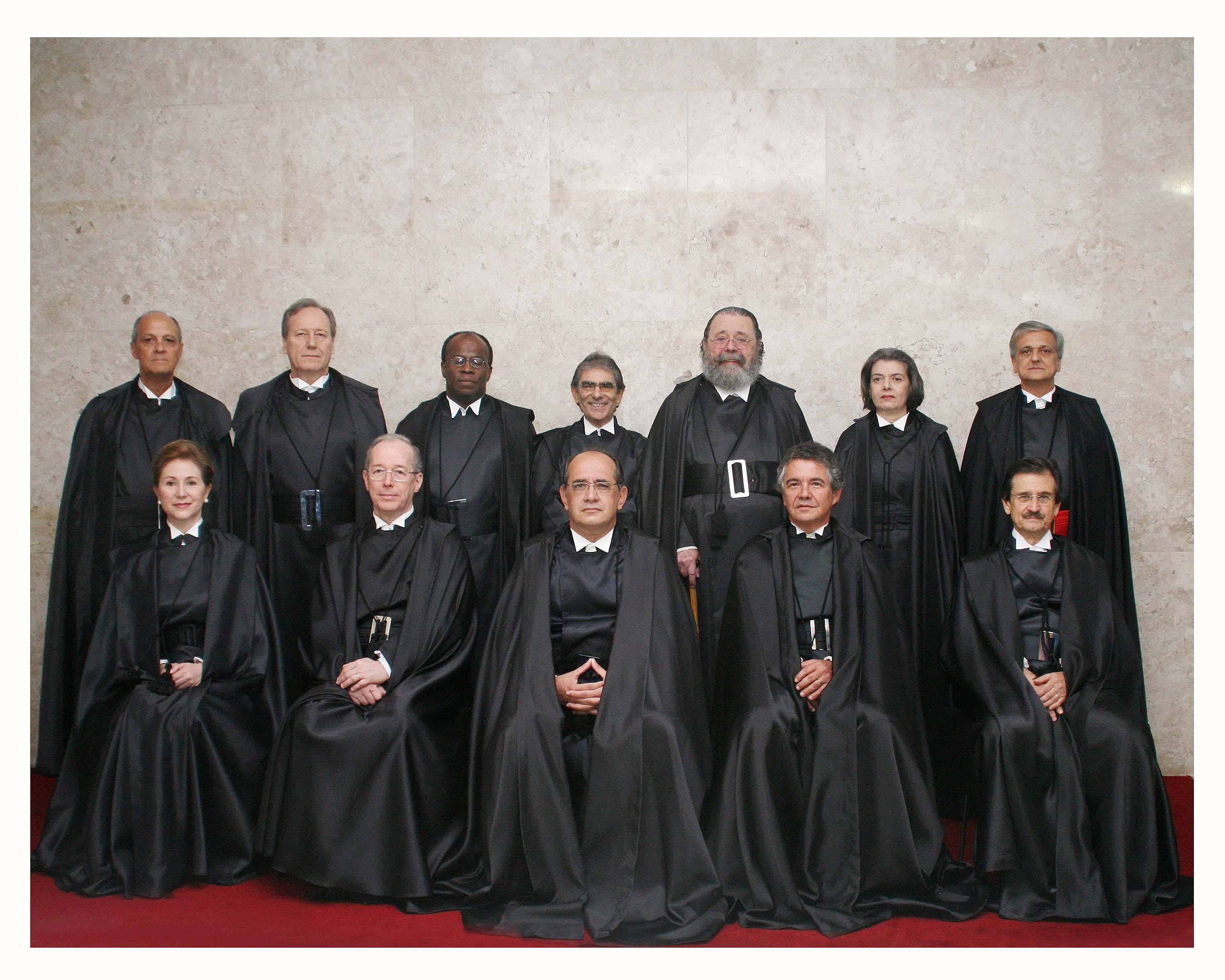
Judges of the Supreme Federal Court of Brazil

In Brazil, judges are simply called "Juiz" or "Juíza" (male and female forms of "judge") and traditionally addressed to as "Vossa Excelência" (lit. 'Your Excellency', translated as 'Your Honor') or "Meritíssimo" ('Honorable', but it is used as a pronoun also translated as 'Your Honor'). Judges that are part of a panel in a State Court, or Federal Court are called "desembargadores". Judges sitting in the higher courts (Supremo Tribunal Federal, Superior Tribunal de Justiça, Tribunal Superior do Trabalho, Superior Tribunal Militar and Tribunal Superior Eleitoral) are called "ministro" or "ministra" (male and female forms of "minister") and also referred to as "Vossa Excelência".

=== International courts ===
At the International Court of Justice, judges may be addressed by the titles they received in their countries of origin. For the purposes of Court proceedings and documents, they are referred to as "Judge".

Judges of the International Criminal Court are referred to as "judge".

== See also ==
- Adjudicator
- AI judge
- Barrister
- Biy
- Court dress
- Election judge
- Hebrew Bible judges
- Judicial deference
- Judicial immunity
- Judiciary
- Lawyer
- Lay judge
- Legal ethics
- List of jurists
- Magistrate
- Prosecutor
- Public defender
- Solicitor
