= Zhosaly =

Mountain in Kazakhstan

- Жосалы
- Location within Kazakhstan

Highest point
- Elevation: 871 m (2,858 ft)
- Coordinates: 48°25′37″N 75°28′47″E

Geography
- Country: Kazakhstan
- Region: Karaganda Region
- Parent range: Ayr Mountains; Kazakh Uplands

Geology
- Rock age(s): Cambrian, Carboniferous
- Mountain type: Granite

Zhosaly (Kazakh: Жосалы, romanized: Josalı) is a mountain in Karaganda Region, Kazakhstan.

The Zhosaly Sanatorium is located on the northwestern side of the mountain.

== Geography ==
Zhosaly rises at the southwestern end of the Ayr Mountains, part of the Kazakh Uplands. With an elevation 871 metres (2,858 ft), it is the highest summit of the range. Lake Saumalkol lies 20 kilometres (12 mi) to the southeast.

== See also ==
- Geography of Kazakhstan
