= Ashchysu (Ayr) =

River in Kazakhstan

Ashchysu Ащысу
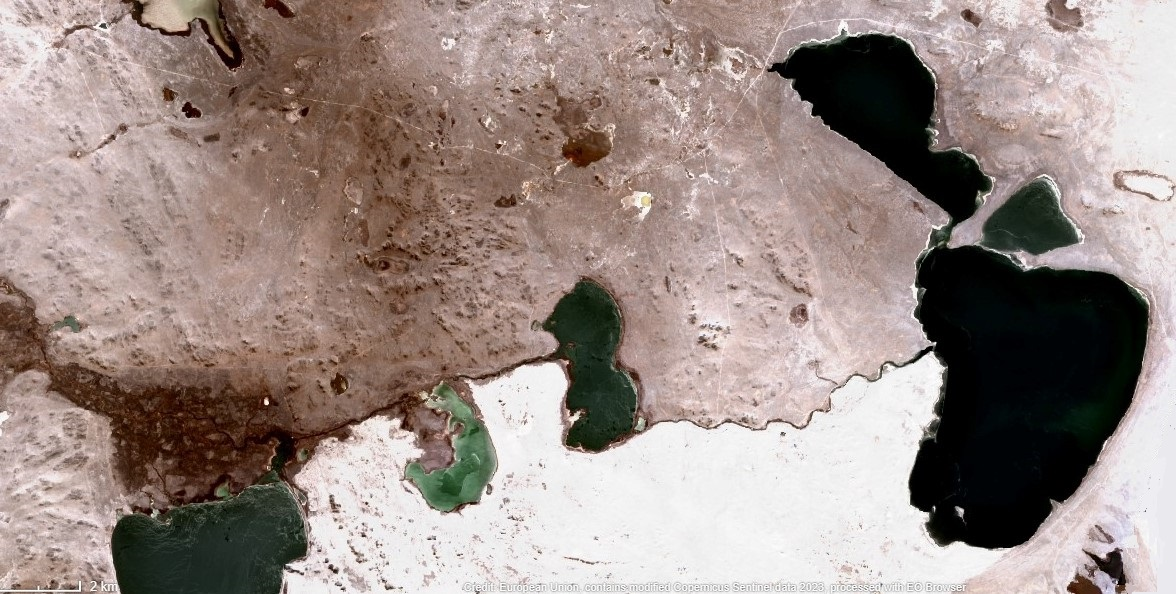
- Sentinel-2 image of the final stretch of river Ashchysu and its mouth in Alkamergen lake

- Mouth location in Kazakhstan

Location
- Countries: Kazakhstan

Physical characteristics
- Source: Ayr Mountains; Kazakh Uplands
  - coordinates: 49°59′50″N 75°05′23″E
- Mouth: Alkamergen
  - coordinates: 51°07′17″N 76°37′50″E
- Length: 348 km (216 mi)
- Basin size: 7,420 km^{2} (2,860 sq mi)
- Discharge
  - average: 0.44 cubic metres per second (16 cu ft/s) at Musa Shormanov

The Ashchysu (Kazakh: Ащысу; Russian: Ащысу) is a river in the Bukhar-Zhyrau District, Karaganda Region, and May District, Pavlodar Region, Kazakhstan. It is 348 kilometres (216 mi) long and has a catchment area of 7,420 square kilometres (2,860 sq mi).

The area of the basin is a seasonal grazing ground for local cattle and the Ashchysu is used for watering livestock. The river is frozen between November and April.

== Course ==
The Ashchysu has its sources in the northwest-facing slopes of the Ayr Mountains of the Kazakh Uplands. It heads first northwards, then it bends when it reaches the highland plain and flows roughly northeastwards at the feet of the range along its northern slopes. Further downstream it describes a wide bend west of the Zheltau and heads roughly northwestwards, leaving salt lake Tuzkol to the east near Zhanatilek. When it reaches Musa Shormanov village (former Tendik), the river bends and heads northeastwards within a 7.5 km (4.7 mi) wide valley. Further downstream it bends and flows eastwards north of the Bayanaul Range, past a number of salt lakes, including Zharkol at 51°06′44″N 75°51′29″E and Sulysor further east. Finally it reaches lake Alkamergen (Алқамерген), entering it from the western shore.

The Ashchysu is fed mainly by snow, as well as underground water. Its main tributary is the Zhylandybulak. During the spring floods the water of the river is fresh, but in the summer the flow is interrupted and the river breaks up into pools of bitter/salty water.

== See also ==
- List of rivers of Kazakhstan
