= Biy =

Judges during the Kazakh Khanate era

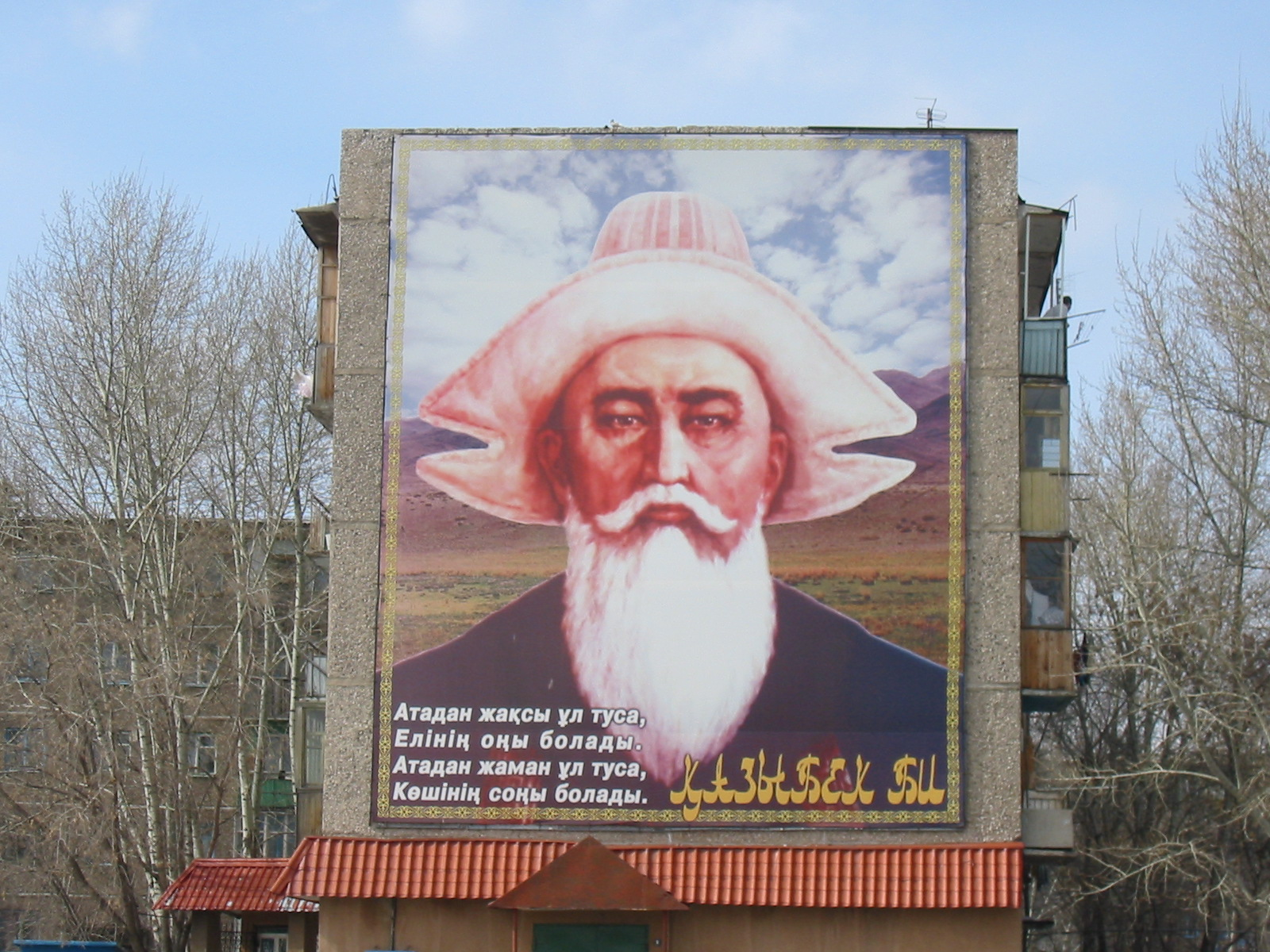
Giant likeness of Qazybek Biy in Karaganda, Kazakhstan

Biy (Kazakh: Би, Bi) were elected Kazakh judges and administrators during the Kazakh Khanate era. Biys were below Sultans in rank. Many consider "Biy" to simply be a Kazakh variation of "Bey", though there are major differences: like, for example, the fact that "biy" is not an inheritable position.

Biys of Kazakhstan were chosen mainly based on their personal qualities. They possessed knowledge of history, the people's lives, customs and traditions, they were distinguished with their wisdom and eloquence. During the years of the strengthening of the Kazakh Khanate (XVII-XVIII centuries) and continuous wars fought with the Dzonghar Khanate, biys of three zhuzs played a major role: Senior — Töle Biy, Middle – Qazybek Biy, Junior – Äiteke Biy. They are considered to be three of the most important historical figures in Kazakh history. During the years of colonialism of the Russian Empire, these professions and their practices were either weakened or stopped completely. The profession of Biys was eventually abolished by an imperial order on 25 March 1891.

The Council of biys was the highest council, a kind of senate.
