= Kyzyltau (Pavlodar Region) =

Mountain range in Kazakhstan

- Қызылтау
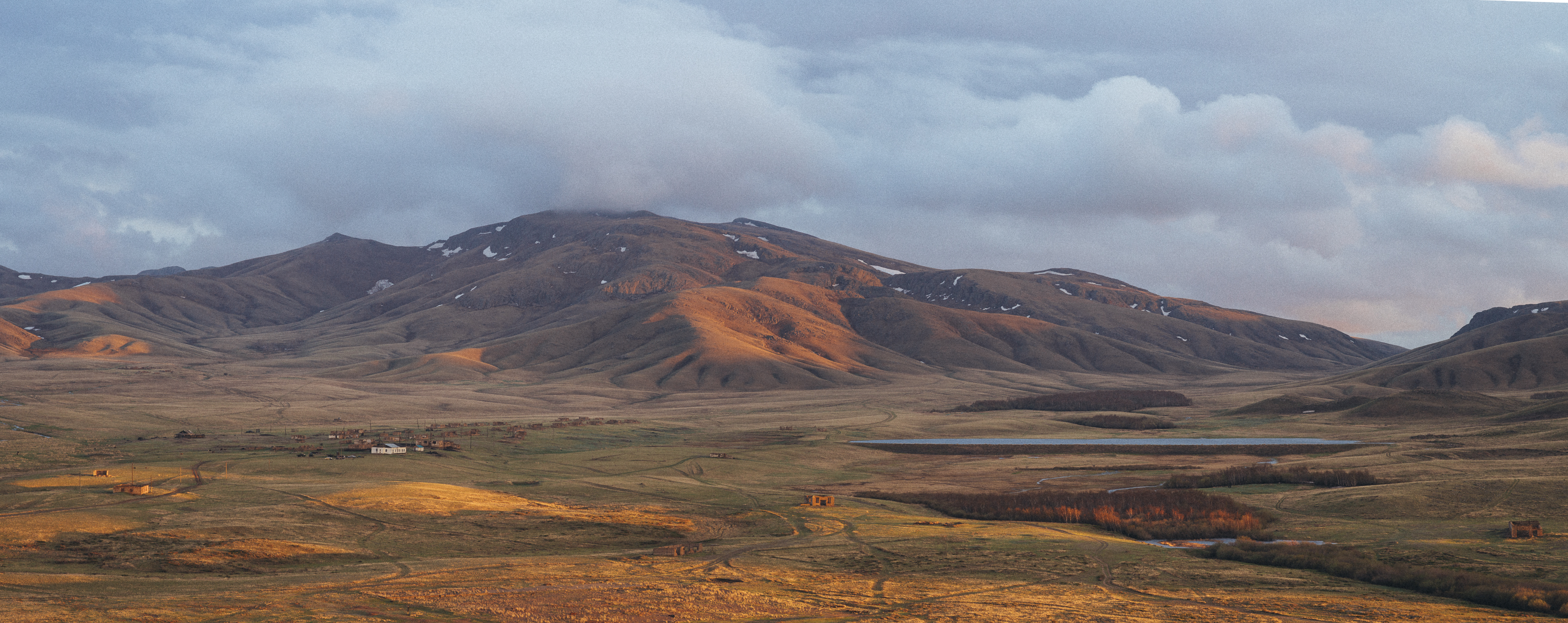
- Northern slopes of Kyzyltau mountain range

Highest point
- Peak: Auliye
- Elevation: 1,055 m (3,461 ft)
- Coordinates: 50°23′56″N 76°09′15″E

Dimensions
- Length: 60 km (37 mi) ESE/WNW
- Width: 15 km (9.3 mi) NNE/SSW

Geography
- Location within Kazakhstan
- Location: Kazakhstan
- Range coordinates: 50°24′N 75°45′E
- Parent range: Kazakh Uplands

Geology
- Orogeny: Alpine orogeny
- Rock age(s): Permian, Devonian and Middle and Lower Carboniferous
- Rock type: Granite

Climbing
- Easiest route: From Yegindybulak

Kyzyltau (Kazakh: Қызылтау) is a mountain range located in Bayanaul District, Pavlodar Region, Kazakhstan.

The border between Karaganda Region and Pavlodar Region lies at the southern end of the mountain range. Zhanatilek lies roughly 60 kilometers (37 mi) to the west and Yegindybulak town 55 kilometers (34 mi) to the south.

== Geography ==
Kyzyltau is located in the central sector of the Kazakh Uplands, 35 kilometers (22 mi) to the southeast of the Bayanaul Range. The Zheltau massif rises 13 kilometers (8.1 mi) to the west of the southwestern slopes. The range stretches for roughly 60 kilometers (37 mi) between the valley of the Espe river to the valley of the Balatundik.

The highest point of the range is 1,055 metres (3,461 ft) high Auliye (Kazakh: Әулие) located in the southern/central sector. Another important mountain is 764 metres (2,507 ft) high Karakuys (Kazakh: Қарақуыс) in the northwestern part. There are springs at the feet of the range.

== Flora ==
In non-rocky areas the mountains are partly covered with low vegetation, such as Caragana, Spiraea, Helictotrichon, Stipa capillata, Festuca and Artemisia. These are used as livestock pasture by local herdsmen.

== See also ==
- Geography of Kazakhstan
