= Bukhar-zhirau Kalmakanov =

Kazakh poet

Būqar jyrau Qalqamanūly
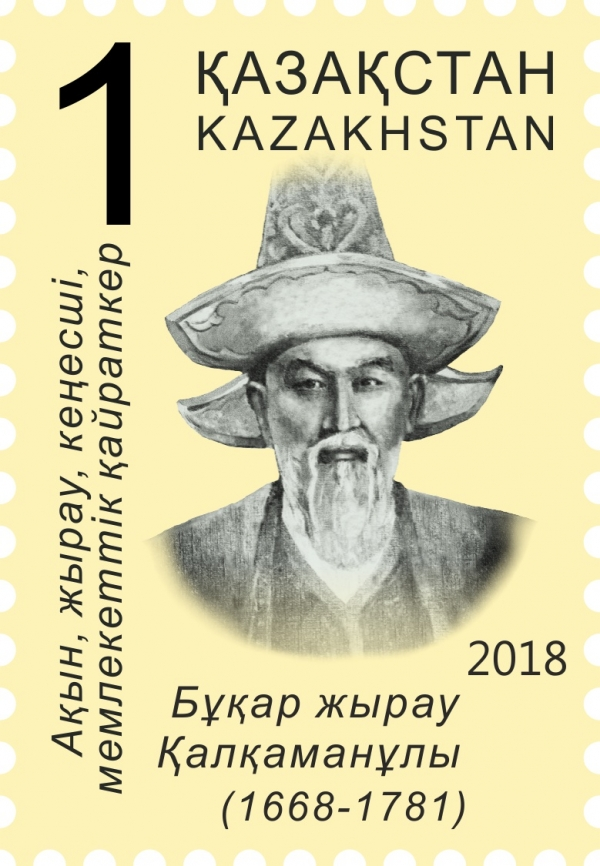
- Būqar jyrau on a 2018 Kazakh stamp
- Born: 1668; Bayanaul, Kazakh Khanate
- Died: 1771; Bayanaul, Kazakh Khanate
- Occupation: Poet

Būqar jyrau Qalqamanūly (Note: Often transliterated as Bukhar-zhirau Kalkamanuly through a Russified Romanization of Бухар жырау Калкаманулы.) (Kazakh: Бұқар жырау Қалқаманұлы; 1668–1771) was a Kazakh poet at the court of the Middle Horde. He was active at the court during the reign of the Ablai Khan. Although his primary activity was law-making, poetry, and singing, Būqar jyrau also acted as an advisor to the Khan. Because of this, his poetry dealt with broader themes which included politics, the foreign policy of the Khanate, and the life of the Khan.

== Honours ==
- Many streets in Kazakhstan's settlements are named after Būqar jyrau.
- In Almaty, a residential complex called "Bukhar-zhirau Towers" was built on the banks of the Esentai River.
- In 1993, a granite monument was erected in his hometown of Bayanaul in honor of Būqar jyrau's 325th birthday, and a bronze monument was installed in the center of Karaganda in 2008.
- In 1993, Kazakhstan issued a postage stamp dedicated to Būqar jyrau.
- The Kazakh-Turkish Lyceum for Gifted Children in Karaganda is named after Būqar jyrau.
- The Būqar jyrau Museum of Literature and Art has been operating in Pavlodar since 1992, located in an old building dating back to 1897.
