= Botakara =

Botakara Ботақара
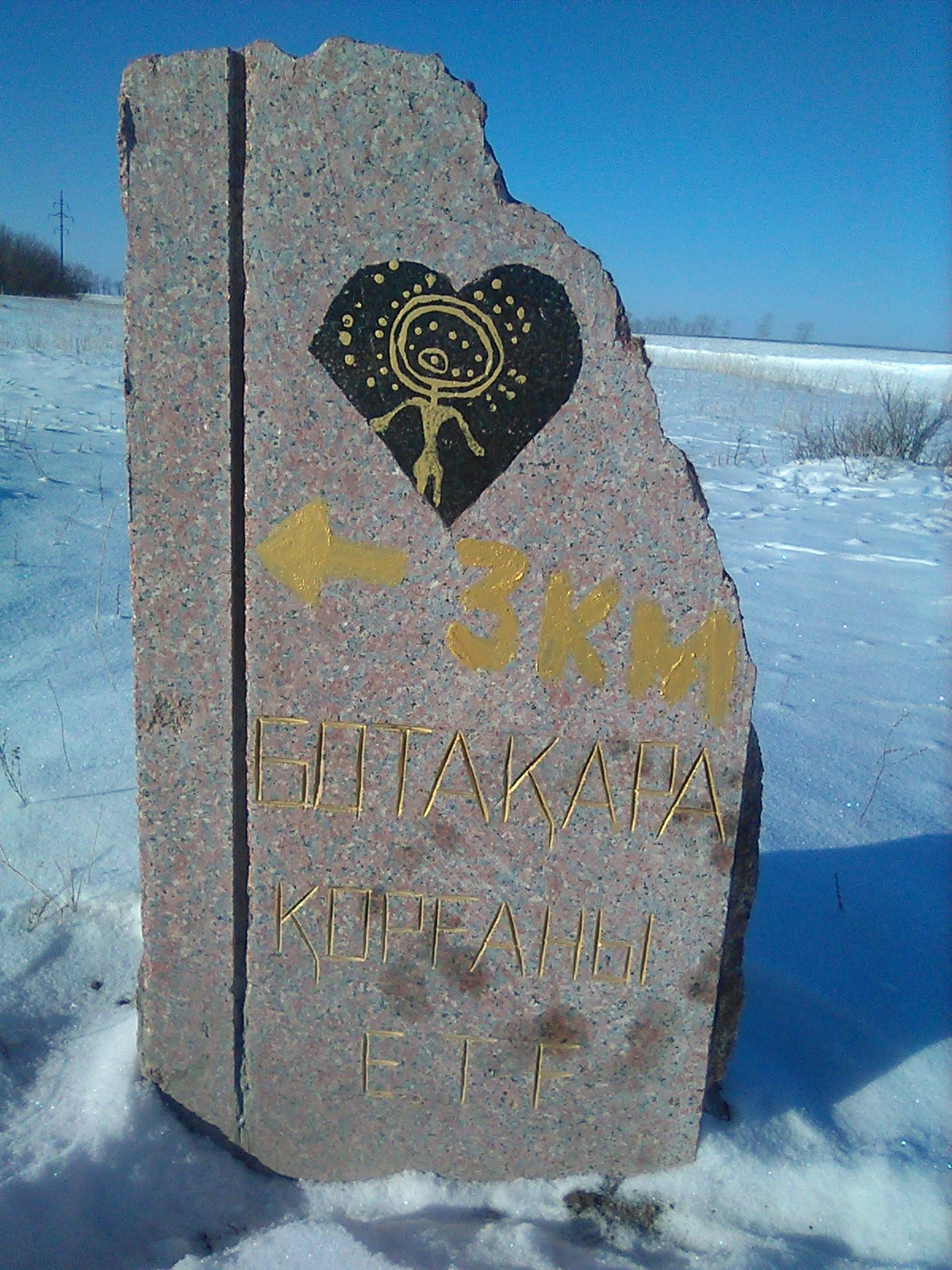
- Ancient burial ground marker

- Location in Kazakhstan
- Coordinates: 50°03′40″N 73°42′56″E
- Country: Kazakhstan
- Region: Karaganda Region
- District: Bukhar-Zhyrau District
- Established: 1826

Population (2019)
  - Total: 5,223
- Time zone: UTC+6
- Postcode: 100400

Botakara (Kazakh: Ботақара), known as "Ulyanovsk" until 1997, is a settlement in Karaganda Region, Kazakhstan. It is the capital of Bukhar-Zhyrau District and the administrative center of the Botakara rural district (KATO code - 354030100). Population: 5,351 (2009 census results); 5,166 (1999 census results).

== History ==
Founded in 1901 as the village of Sannikovskoye by Ukrainian settlers from Kherson, Chernihiv and Tauride provinces. During its existence, it changed its name several times. By decree of the NKVD on November 2, 1920, the village of Sannikovo, Akmola district, was renamed to Trotskoye, and the Sannikovsky volost was renamed to Trotskaya. From 1934 to 1961 the village was called Kolkhoznoe. In 1961, the village was given the status of a workers' settlement and the name Ulyanovsky, which it bore until 1997.

== Archaeology ==
The Botakara Bronze Age burial ground is an archaeological site located 14 km (8.7 mi) west of the town.

== Geography ==
Botakara lies in the Kazakh Uplands by the banks of the Nura river. Lake Botakara is located to the north. The Karaganda — Karkaralinsk highway and the Karaganda — Karagaily railway pass through the village.
