= Kazakh Uplands =

Geological formation in Kazakhstan

- Saryarqa (Kazakh); Казахский мелкосопочник (Russian)
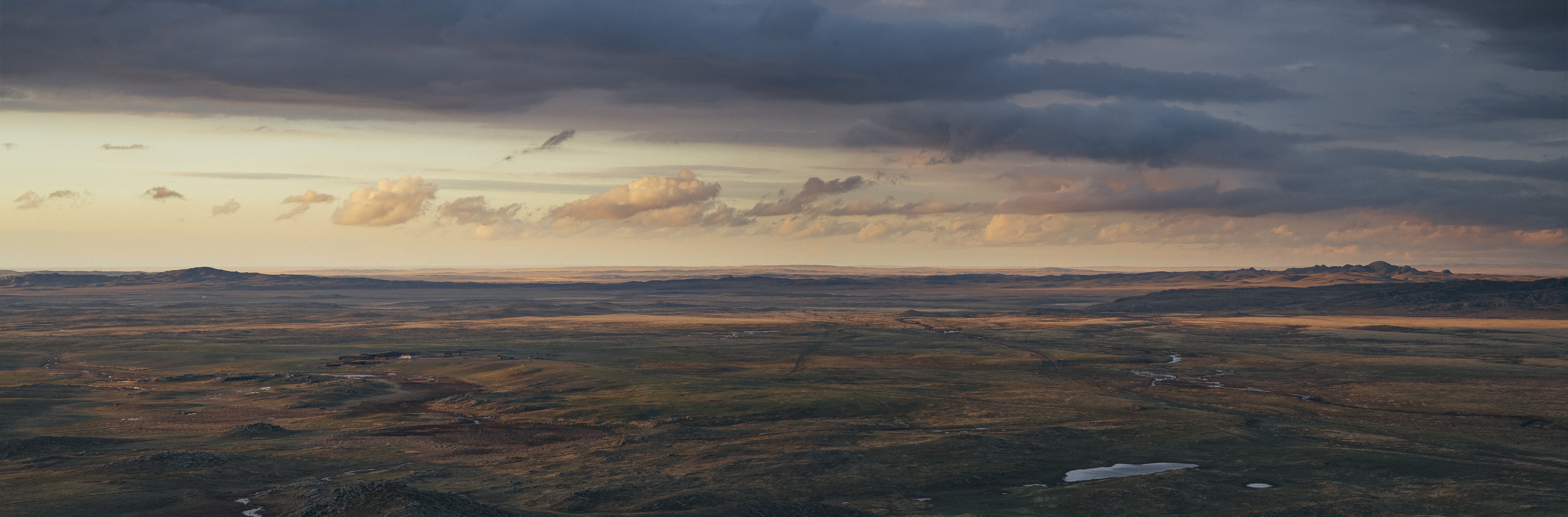
- Vast steppe with occasional rock outcrops near Kyzyltau mountain range

Highest point
- Peak: Aksoran
- Elevation: 1,565 m (5,135 ft)
- Coordinates: 48°25′26″N 75°28′16″E

Dimensions
- Length: 1,200 km (750 mi) E / W
- Width: 400 km (250 mi) N/ S

Geography
- Location within Kazakhstan
- Location: Kazakhstan
- Range coordinates: 50°26′N 69°11′E

Geology
- Orogeny: Alpine orogeny
- Rock age(s): Paleozoic, Cenozoic
- Rock type(s): Granite, limestone, schist, quartzite, sandstone

Kazakh Uplands

Ecology
- Realm: Palearctic
- Biome: Temperate grasslands, savannas, and shrublands

Geography
- Area: 72,000 km^{2} (28,000 mi^{2})
- Country: Kazakhstan

The Kazakh Uplands or the Kazakh Hummocks, known in Kazakh as the Saryarqa (Cyrillic: Сарыарқа, pronounced [sɑˌrə(ʔ)ɑrˈqɑ]; lit. 'Yellow Ridge'), is a large peneplain formation extending throughout the central and eastern regions of Kazakhstan.

Administratively the Kazakh Uplands stretch across the East Kazakhstan, Pavlodar, Akmola, Ulytau and Karaganda regions. Several notable cities, including the country's capital, Astana, are located in the uplands. There are large deposits of coal in the north and copper in the south.

== Geography ==
The Kazakh Uplands are limited by the West Siberian Plain to the north, the Irtysh valley to the northeast, the Balkhash-Alakol Basin to the south and southeast, the Turan Lowland to the southwest and by the Turgay Depression to the west.

Rivers such as the Ishim, Sileti, Sarysu, Nura, Kulanotpes, Ashchysu, Tundik and Uly-Zhylanshyk have their sources in the uplands. Lake Tengiz lies in an intermontane basin of the uplands and is the largest of the area. The Kokshetau Lakes are an important tourist attraction.

=== Subranges ===
The uplands include mountain ranges of moderate altitude separated by elevated flat intermontane basins. The main ones are:

- Kyzylarai, highest point Aksoran, 1,565 metres (5,135 ft)
- Karkaraly Range, highest point Zhirensakal, 1,403 metres (4,603 ft)
- Kokshetau Hills, a subrange of the uplands
  - Kokshetau Massif, highest point Mount Kokshe, 947 metres (3,107 ft)
- Kent Range, highest point Mount Kent, 1,469 metres (4,820 ft)
- Bayanaul Range, highest point Akbet, 1,022 metres (3,353 ft)
- Ulytau, highest point Akmeshit, 1,131 metres (3,711 ft)
- Kyzyltas, highest point Kushoky, 1,283 metres (4,209 ft)
- Degelen, highest point 1,084 metres (3,556 ft)
- Chingiztau, highest point Kosoba, 1,304 metres (4,278 ft)
- Bektauata, highest point 1,213 metres (3,980 ft)
- Mount Ku, highest point 1,356 metres (4,449 ft)
- Bakty Range, highest point Mount Aktau 1,176 metres (3,858 ft)
- Myrzhyk, highest point Yegibai 970 metres (3,180 ft)
- Khankashty, highest point 1,220 metres (4,000 ft)
- Semizbughy, highest point 1,049 metres (3,442 ft)
- Ayr Mountains, highest point Zhosaly 871 metres (2,858 ft)
- Zheltau, highest point 959 metres (3,146 ft)
- Kyzyltau, highest point Auliye, 1,055 metres (3,461 ft)
- Keshubai, highest point 1,368 metres (4,488 ft)
- Bugyly, highest point Burkit, 1,187 metres (3,894 ft)
- Yereymentau Mountains, highest point Akdym, 901 metres (2,956 ft)

== Ecology ==
Parts of the Kazakh Uplands are included in the Saryarka – Steppe and Lakes of Northern Kazakhstan World Heritage Site. It belongs to the Palearctic temperate grasslands, savannas, and shrublands ecoregion of the temperate grasslands, savannas, and shrublands biome. The Karkaraly National Park, Kokshetau National Park, Burabay National Park and Bayanaul National Park are protected areas in the ranges of the upland. Rare species, such as the Asiatic cheetah, may still live in the region.

== See also ==
- Geography of Kazakhstan
