= Bukhar-Zhyrau District =

Coordinates: 50°03′30″N 73°43′00″E

Bukhar-Zhyrau
- District
- Бұқар жырау ауданы
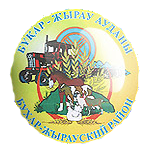
- Coat of arms

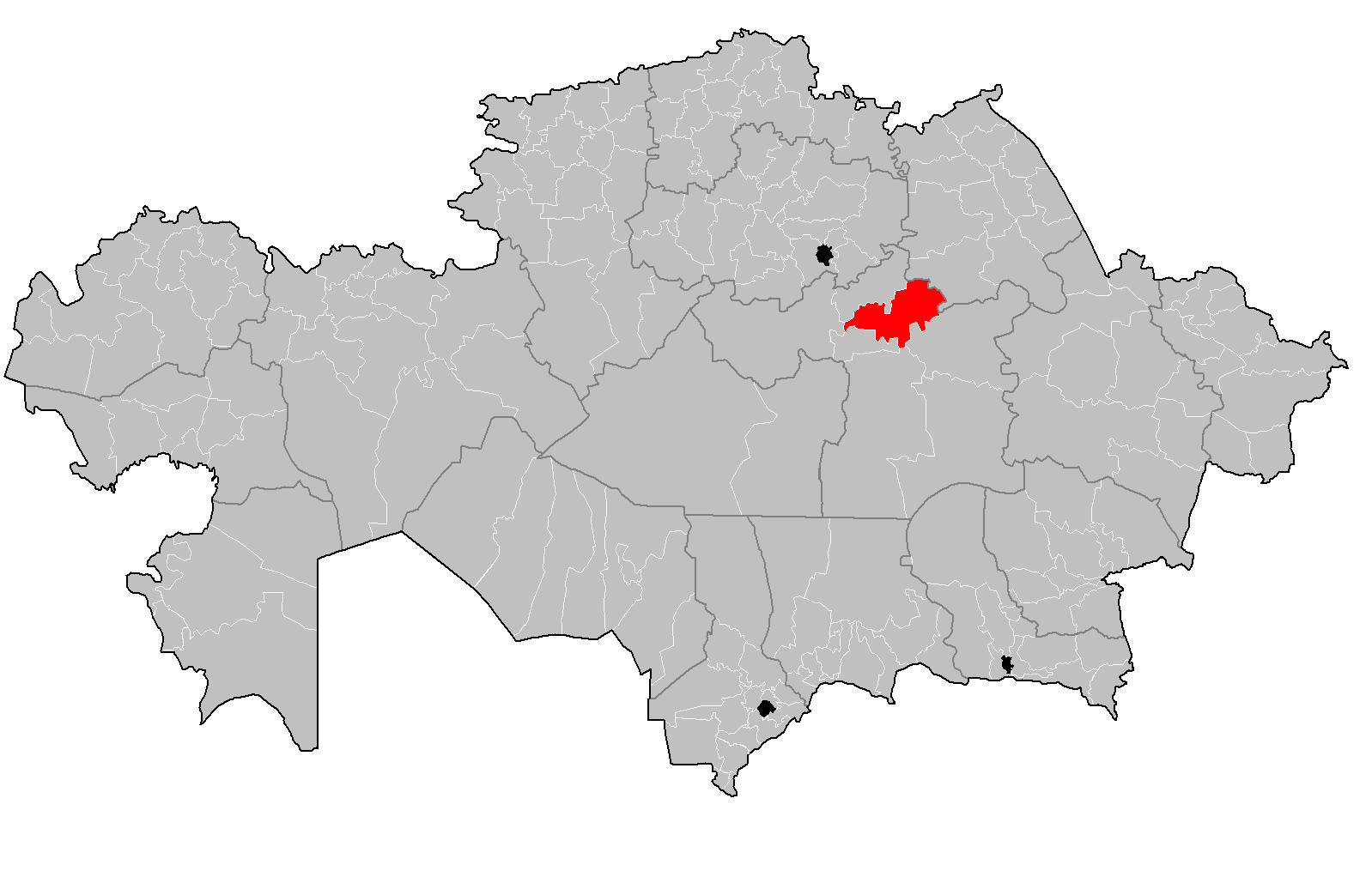
- Country: Kazakhstan
- Region: Karaganda Region
- Administrative center: Botakara
- Founded: 1938

Government
  - Akim: Ablay Sultangali

Area
  - Total: 5,628 sq mi (14,576 km^{2})

Population (2013)
  - Total: 63,236
- Time zone: UTC+6 (East)

Bukhar-Zhyrau District (Kazakh: Бұқар жырау ауданы, Būqar Jyrau audany) is a district of Karaganda Region in central Kazakhstan. The administrative center of the district is the settlement of Botakara. Population: 63,236 (2013 estimate); 64,003 (2009 census results); 69,617 (1999 census results).

== History ==
Formed in 1938 as Voroshilovsky District. In 1961, it was renamed into the Ulyanovsk District (the regional center Kolkhoznoye was renamed into the urban-type settlement Ulyanovsk). In 1997, the district was merged with Telmansky and renamed the Bukhar-Zhyrau district in honor of the Kazakh akyn Bukhar Zhyrau (the district center was renamed Botakara).

== Geography ==
Bukhar-Zhyrau District lies in the Kazakh Uplands. 1,049 meters (3,442 ft) high mount Semizbughy is the highest point in the district. Rudnichnoye lake is located near it.
