= Shabanbay Bi =

Shabanbay Bi Шабанбай би
- Village
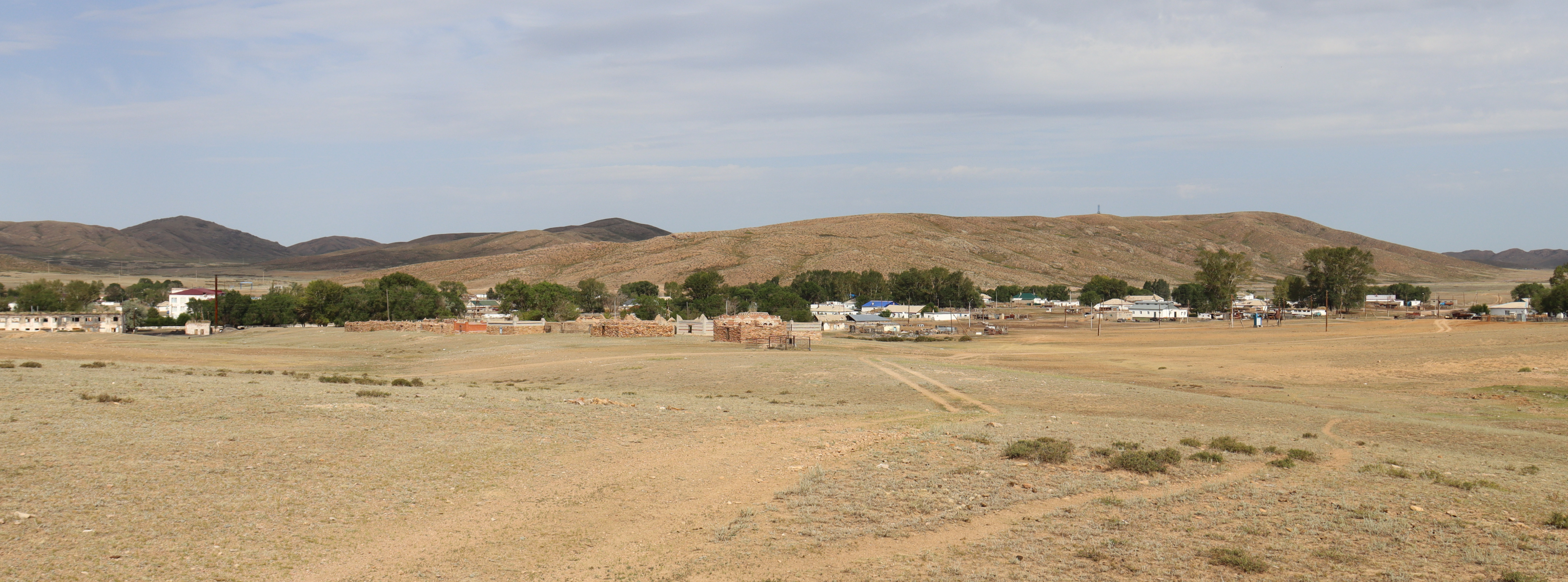
- Image of the village.

- Location in Kazakhstan
- Coordinates: 48°24′08″N 75°23′37″E
- Country: Kazakhstan
- Region: Karaganda Region
- District: Aktogay District

Population (2009)
  - Total: 563
- Time zone: UTC+6 (East Kazakhstan Time)
- Post code: 100207

Shabanbay Bi (Kazakh: Шабанбай би), until 1996 Shylym (Шылым), is a village in Aktogay District, Karaganda Region, Kazakhstan. It is the administrative center of the Shabanbay Bi Rural District (KATO code - 353677100). Population: 563 (2009 census results); 857 (1999 census results).

== Geography ==
The village is located by the Karatal River, a left tributary of the Tokrau, about 32 kilometers (20 mi) east of Aktogay, the district administrative center. Mount Aksoran, the highest point of the Kazakh Uplands (Saryarka), rises 10 kilometers (6.2 mi) to the east, in the Kyzylarai massif.
