= List of islands of Kazakhstan =

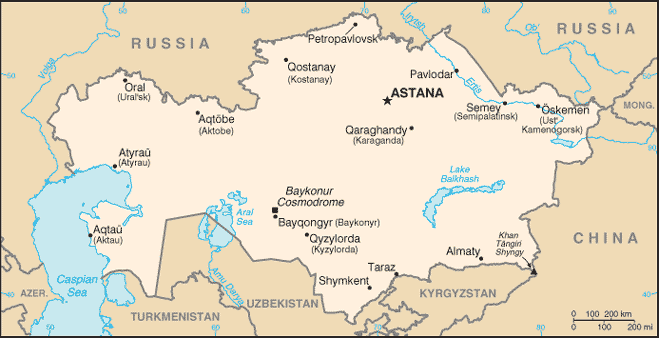
Map of Kazakhstan

This is a List of islands of Kazakhstan. There are several inland islands with Kazakhstan, including those on Lake Balkash, Lake Tengizi, the Caspian Sea, and the Aral Sea within Kazakhstan with islands. Click on the OpenStreetMap link to see the location of notable islands of Kazakhstan.

== Islands of Kazakhstan ==
=== Aral Sea ===
The name Aral Sea roughly translates as "Sea of Islands", referring to over 1,100 islands that had dotted its waters. In the Mongolic and Turkic languages aral means "island, archipelago". Islands in Kazakhstan on the Aral Sea include:

- Barsa-Kelmes (former island on the Aral Sea), 45°38′N 59°52′E
- Kokaral (former island on the Aral Sea), 46°14′30″N 60°44′10″E
- Vozrozhdeniya Island, Aral Sea, (used by the Former Soviet Union for biological weapon testing), 45°09′N 59°19′E

=== Caspian Sea ===
The Caspian Sea has numerous islands throughout, all of them near the coasts; none in the deeper parts of the sea. Ogurja Ada is the largest island on the sea in Turkmenistan. The island is 37 km (23 mi) long, with gazelles roaming freely on it. In the North Caspian, the majority of the islands are small and uninhabited, like the Tyuleniy Archipelago, an Important Bird Area (IBA), although some of them have human settlements. Islands on thee Caspian Sea that are in Kazakhstan include:

- Bolshiye Peshnyye Islands (two islands in the Caspian Sea), 46°47′N 51°44′E
- Durneva Island, Caspian Sea, 45°28′N 52°45′E
- Spirkin Oseredok Island, Caspian Sea, 46°27′N 49°53′E
- Tyuleniy Archipelago (five islands), Caspian Sea, 44°55′N 50°22′E
- Zhanbay Island, Caspian Sea, 46°17′N 49°48′E

=== Lake Balkash ===
In total, there are 43 Islands on Lake Balkhash, covering 66 square km. The Islands of Basaral, Tasaral, Ortaaral, Ozinaral, and Algazi are the most important and largest of the Balkhash Islands.

View of Lake Balkhash from Space (August 2002)
The numbers mark the largest peninsulas, island and bays: 1. Saryesik peninsula, separating the lake into two parts, and Uzynaral Strait; 2. Baygabyl Peninsula; 3. Balai Peninsula; 4. Shaukar Peninsula; 5. Kentubek Peninsula; 6. Basaral and Ortaaral Islands; 7. Tasaral Island; 8. Shempek Bay; 9. Saryshagan Bay

- Basaral, Lake Balkhash, 45°28′N 73°43′E
- Korzhin Island, Lake Balkhash, 46°35′N 75°55′E
- Tasaral, Lake Balkhash, 46°16′N 74°4′E

=== Lake Tengizi ===
Kazakhstani islands on Lake Tengizi include:

- Tengizi Islands, 50°21′N 69°03′E
