= Begazy (village) =

Begazy Беғазы
- Village
- Beğazy
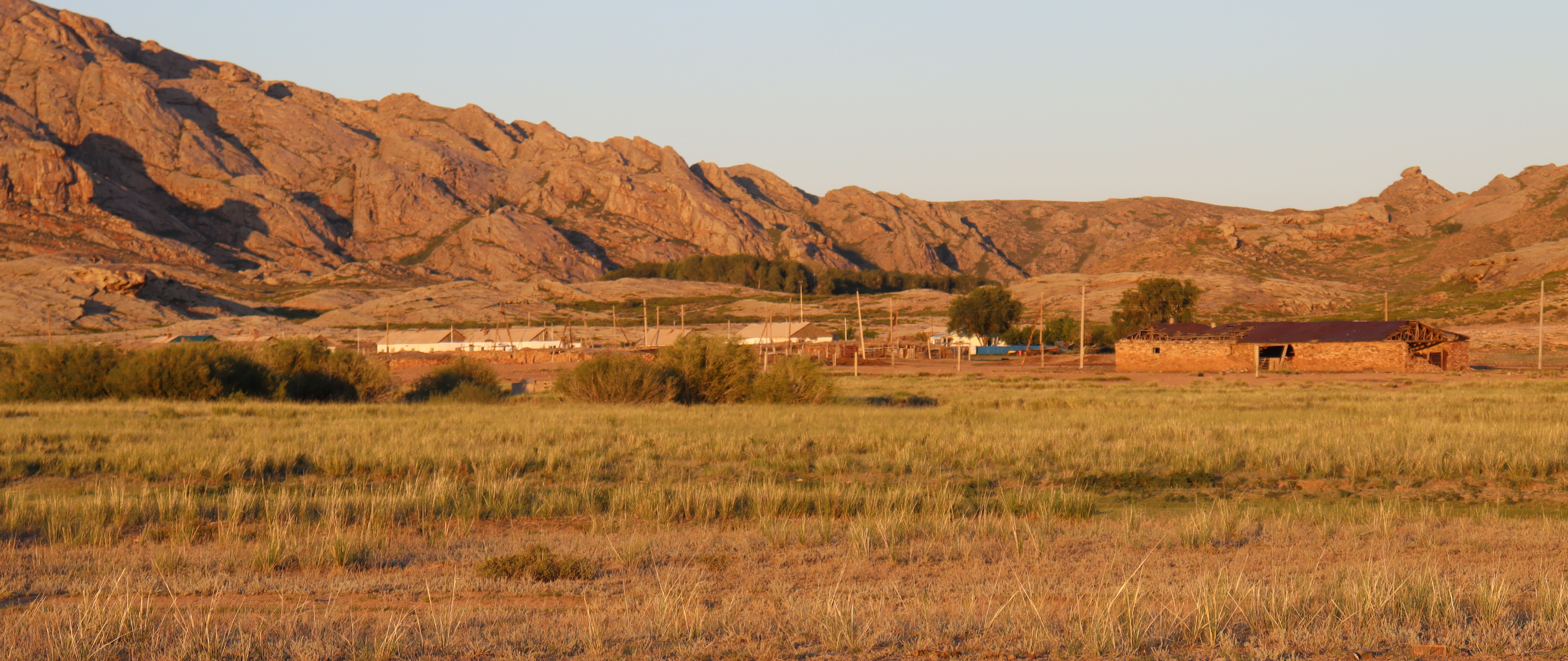
- An image of the village.
- Interactive map of Begazy
- Location in Kazakhstan
- Coordinates: 48°15′57″N 75°21′07″E
- Country: Kazakhstan
- Region: Karaganda Region
- District: Aktogai District

Population (2009)
  - Total: 81

Begazy (Kazakh: Беғазы, until 1996 — Akshkol) is a village in the Aktogai District in the Karaganda Region of Kazakhstan. It is a part of the Shabanbai Rural District.

The village is located on the shore of the river Karatal (a tributary of Tokrau). Near the village, the archeological site of the Begazy Necropolis is located.

== Population ==
In 1999, the population of the village was 47 people (26 men and 21 women). According to the 2009 census, there were 81 people (44 men and 37 women) living in the village.
