= Zhauyrtau =

- Жауыр тауы
- Location within Kazakhstan

Highest point
- Elevation: 1,090 m (3,580 ft)
- Coordinates: 48°08′19″N 76°59′58″E

Geography
- Country: Kazakhstan
- Region: Karaganda Region
- District: Aktogay
- Parent range: Kazakh Uplands

Climbing
- Easiest route: from Aiyrtas

Zhauyrtau is a mountain located 10 km north-east of the village of Aiyrtas (Айыртас), Aktogay District, Karaganda Region. It is 7 km long from west to east and is 5 km wide.

== Origin of the name ==
The name of the mountain Zhauyrtau comes from Kazakh words “zhauyr” - a wound on the horse's back caused by a saddle and “tau” - mountain. The origin of the name Zhauyrtau is associated with the Kazakh folk epic "Kozy-Korpesh - Bayan-sulu". According to one of the sources, the mountain got its name since it resembles the shape of a horse's back. Other sources claim that its name does not describe its appearance in any way and is associated with the place where the character of the epic Aybas left his horse.

The "Kozy-Korpesh - Bayan-sulu" describes how a greedy Karabay, who did not want to let his daughter Bayan marry her beloved Kozy, decided to move away from the Kozy's aul in the hope of marrying her with another man who would match his venal expectations. According to the epic, when they reached the Ayagoz River, they met the son of the Nogai Bay, Kodar, who soon fell in love with the beautiful Bayan. Having lost all hope, the girl decided to send a messenger Aybas to her lover with the news that her father wants to marry her to Kodar against her will.

Aybas rode his stallion Baka, which was given to him by Bayan, for a long time across the endless steppes of Saryarka. Tired from the ride, he did not notice how he lost a dombra (a Kazakh musical instrument), a necklace, and a headdress with heron feathers from the chest, that Bayan wanted to address to Kozy. The places where he dropped them were eventually named "Dombyraly" (from “dombra”), "Monshakty" (Kaz. "monshak" - necklace), and "Karkaraly" (Kaz. "karkara" - heron).

Despite severe exhaustion, Aibas continued to ride, but the horse was not able to gallop further and stopped by the river, which as a result was named "Tokyrauyn" (Kaz. "tokyrau" - to stop). Devoted to his mission, Aybas let the horse gather strength by the river and rode further. The mountain Zhauyrtau was named in the same way as the above-mentioned places, since, according to the legend, Baka finally stopped next to the mountain due to a long journey and a huge wound under his saddle. Mount Zhauyrtau bore its original name until the 20th century and received a new name Temirtau due to the great transformations in the steppe. In 1940 the academician Kanysh Satbayev has found 200 million tons of iron ore in Karsakbay, Atasu, and Karkaraly fields. As a result, the city of metallurgists Temirtau was built near the mountain, which got its name because it comes from the words "tau-tau temir" – Kaz. "mountains of iron", "abundance of iron". Then, mount Zhauyrtau took over the name of the city and began to be called the same - Temirtau.
