= Kyzyltas =

Range of mountains in Kazakhstan

- Қызылтас
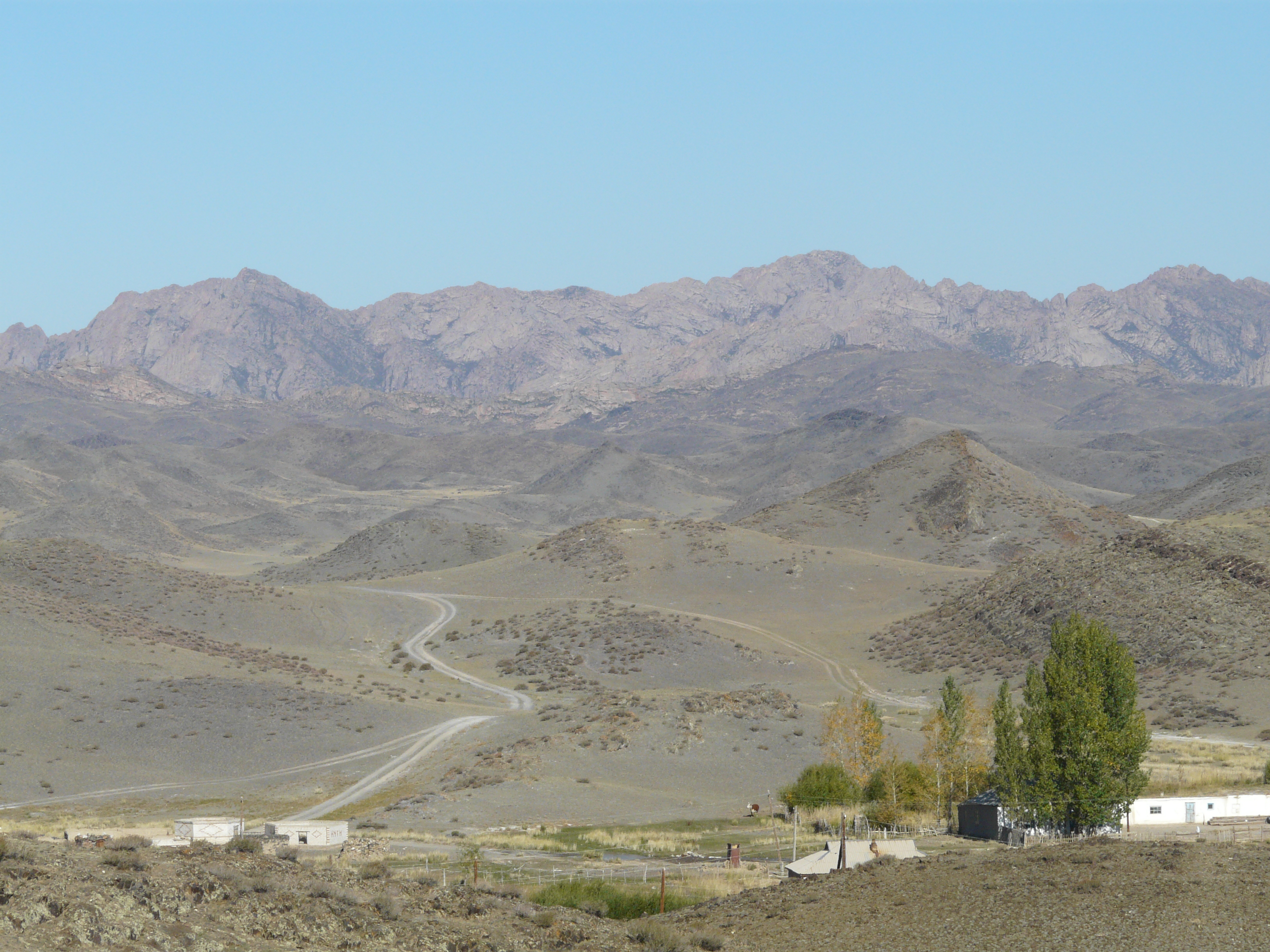
- View of the range

Highest point
- Peak: Kushoky
- Elevation: 1,283 m (4,209 ft)

Dimensions
- Length: 60 km (37 mi) E / W
- Width: 50 km (31 mi) N / S

Geography
- Location within Kazakhstan
- Location: Kazakhstan
- Range coordinates: 49°0′N 74°44′E
- Parent range: Kazakh Uplands

Geology
- Orogeny: Alpine orogeny
- Rock ages: Permian, Carboniferous, Silurian and Devonian
- Rock type(s): Granite, granodiorite

Kyzyltas (Kazakh: Қызылтас) is a range of mountains in Aktogay District, Karaganda Region, Kazakhstan.

The nearest inhabited place is Zhanatogan (Жаңатоған), Karkaraly District.

== Geography ==
Kyzyltas is one of the ranges of the southern part of the Kazakh Upland system (Saryarka). The slightly higher Kyzylarai massif rises to the southeast and the Karkaraly and Kent mountain ranges lie to the northeast. The ridges of the Kyzyltas are deeply dissected by gorges, valleys and ravines. The Nura river has its sources in the range and flows northwards and then westwards into Lake Tengiz. Its main tributary Sherubaynura also has its sources in Kyzyltas. Other rivers originating in the range are the Zhamshi, Zharly and Tokrau; the latter flows southwards towards Lake Balkhash, but its waters get lost in the semidesert sands.

The highest point is Kushoky (Қушоқы), a 1,283 meters (4,209 ft) high summit. Other important peaks are Kimatas (Қиматас) —1,247 meters (4,091 ft), Korpetai (Көрпетай) —1,226 meters (4,022 ft), Zhantau (Жантау) —1,411 meters (4,629 ft), Sorang (Сораң) —1,208 meters (3,963 ft), Kyzyltas (peak) —1,195 meters (3,921 ft), Zhylandy (Жыланды) —1,195 meters (3,921 ft), Keregetas (Керегетас) —1,183 meters (3,881 ft), Nurtai (Нұртай) —1,172 meters (3,845 ft), Otar (Отар) —1,159 meters (3,802 ft), Saryzhol (Сарыжол) —1,153 meters (3,783 ft), Akshoky (Ақшоқы) —1,153 meters (3,783 ft), Akkemer (Ақкемер) —1,132 meters (3,714 ft), Kyzyladyr (Қызыладыр) —1,114 meters (3,655 ft) and Berikkara (Берікқара) —1,099 meters (3,606 ft).

== Flora ==
Vegetation on the range is sparse, only some of the slopes and valleys have tree growth, including birch, aspen and willow. There are areas of low vegetation made up of grasses and arid steppe shrubs, as well as sedges, such as fescue and sage fescue.

== See also ==
- Geography of Kazakhstan
