= Orymbek Zhautykov =

Kazakh mathematician

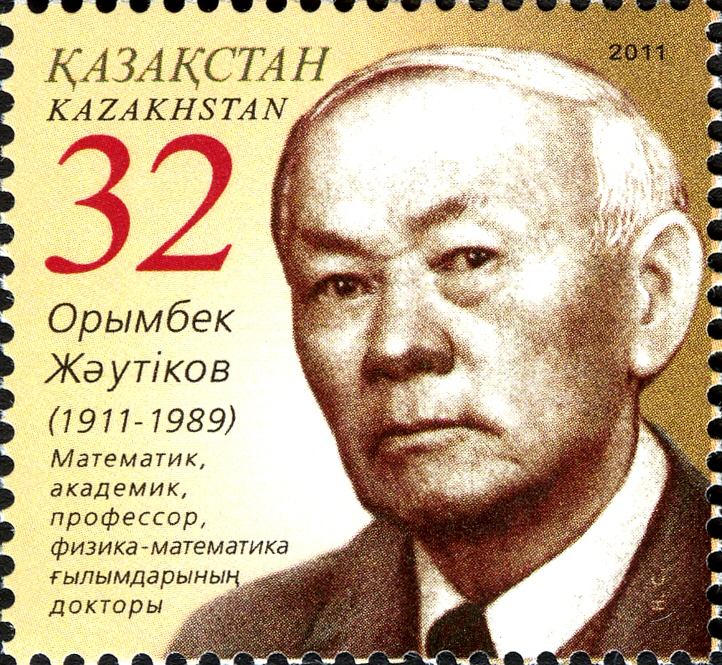
- Born: 1 May 1911; Village No 2, Kounrad District, Karaganda, USSR (Now Kazakhstan)
- Died: 15 May 1989 (aged 78); Almaty, Kazakh SSR, USSR (Now Kazakhstan)
- Known for: International Zhautykov Olympiad in Mathematics
- Awards: Order of the Badge of Honour
- Scientific career
- Fields: Mathematics
- Workplaces: Kazakh Pedagogical University Leningrad State University
- Thesis: Study of infinite systems of differential equations (Russian)

Orymbek Akhmetbekovich Zhautykov (1 May 1911 – 15 May 1989) was a Kazakh mathematician. His mathematical work focussed on stability theory of motion, equations which govern physics and infinite systems of differential equations. Throughout his life he published many different pieces of work including research papers, textbooks and biographies of mathematicians on their birth/death anniversaries.

== Biography ==
=== Early life ===
Zhautykov was born in Village Number 2, Kounrad District of the Karaganda Region, USSR (Present Day Aktogay District, Karagdanda, Kazakhstan) on 1 May 1911. Zhautykov learned how to read the Russian language and became intrigued by it at a young age. This interest of language allowed Orymbek to attend a school in the Deresin region where he would be introduced to mathematics. Zhautykov would achieve magnificent results at the school which would earn him a place at a prestigious school in Karkaralinsk. He graduated from this school in 1930. Orymbek would then go on to study in the Mathematics and Physics schools of the Kazakh Pedagogical University and would attain a first-class degree in mathematics in 1934. During these years Orymbek would be sent out to work at farms in the Zhana-Arka region as well as working on the construction of a mine and the Kargres hydroelectric station. This was part of the First five-year plan.

=== Postgraduate studies ===
In 1934 Zhautykov became an assistant in the Maths department of the Kazakh Pedagogical University. As assistant this allowed Zhautykov to begin his mathematical research. Additionally, due to the university's link to Leningrad State University, Zhautykov registered as an external student in the Leningrad Research Institute of Mathematics and Mechanics. Through this connection Zhautykov would travel to Leningrad to undertake work with his supervisor Isidor Pavlovich Natanson. But the Eastern Front would halt his studies in 1941, which forced him back to the Kazakh Pedagogical University in Almaty where he would work with Konstantin Petrovich Persidsky. Here he would publish the thesis Some questions of the theory of stability of motion in the sense of Lyapunov. This thesis studied the work on stability of solutions for systems of differential equations by Lyapunov. Orymbek was the Dean of the Faculty of Physics and Mathematics at the university from 1941 to 1943.

=== Academy of Sciences of the Kazakh SSR ===
In 1945 Zhautykov and a group of fellow Kazakh scientists, led by Kanysh Satbayev, travelled to Moscow to reimagine the USSR Academy of Sciences for the Kazakh region. This included suggestions for more staffing in the Academy of Sciences of the Kazakh SSR. Whilst on the trip to the USSR, Zhautykov visited Leningrad as well as Moscow where he met fellow mathematicians, including Vladimir Smirnov and Leonid Kantorovich, and introduced areas of science which the new academy in Kazakhstan would focus on. Having intrigued and excited other scientists, Zhautykov's propositions gathered a lot of support. On 25 October 1945 the academy gained founding approval from the Council of People's Commissars of the USSR. The Academy of Sciences of the Kazakh SSR began operating on 1 June 1946, where Zhautykov was appointed a senior researcher. Five years later, Zhautykov was appointed as the head of the Mathematics and Mechanics department.

=== Further research and later years ===
Zhautykov would work as a senior researcher from 1951 to 1965 during which he wrote many pieces of mathematical works mainly focussing on the stability and solutions of differential equations/systems of differential equations. In addition to this Zhautykov would write mathematical biographies commemorating the birthdays or deaths of mathematicians. Zhautykov's first in this series would be on Lyapunov, whose work he had focussed on for his earlier thesis.

In 1958 he wrote one of the most advanced Kazakh-language textbooks on analysis for the time, giving access to mathematical resources at a level which was not readily available to Kazakh speaking students.

Zhautykov would also publish many papers on solutions and uniqueness of solutions of infinite systems of differential equations. In 1961 Zhautykov received a Doctorate for his thesis Study of infinite systems of differential equations (Russian). Defending his thesis, Zhautykov became a professor. On 29 May 1962 he was given the title of an academician of the Academy of Sciences of the Kazakh SSR. Through his dedication to the study of differential equations he headed the Laboratory of Differential Equations from 1965 to 1987.

Zhautykov would hold senior roles at the Institute of Mathematics and Mechanics of the Academy of Sciences of the Kazah SSR and in the Department of Physics and Mathematics in the years 1965–1985. For the book Infinite Systems of Differential Equations (co-written by Professor K.G. Valeev in 1974) Zhautykov was given the title Laureate of the State Prize of the Kazakh SSR (science and technology)

Zhautykov was awarded two Order of the Badge of Honour medals in 1945 as well as one in 1971. In 1981 Orymbek was awarded the Order of the October Revolution.

From 1985 to 1989 Orymbek held a head position at the Academy of Sciences of Kazakhstan until his death on 15 May 1989 in Almaty.

=== Recognition ===
Kazakhstan commemorated the 100th year since his birth by publishing a commemorative stamp picturing him on it. An annual mathematics competition is also named after him; The International Zhautykov Olympiad in Mathematics (IZhO). A school of physics and mathematics as well as a secondary school in Karakaralinsk were named in honour of Orymbek. The first IZhO competition took place in the republican physics and mathematics school named after him.

== Selected publications ==
=== Mathematical works ===
- "The Cauchy Problem for a Countable System of Equations with Partial Derivatives of the nth order" (1951)
- "On a Theorem of Functions of Several Variables in the Theory of Quasilinear Equations with Partial Derivatives" (1954)
- "Generalization of Poisson Brackets for Functions of a Countable Set of Variables" (1957)
- "On the Stability of the Solution of the Cauchy Problem for an Infinite System of Partial Differential Equations" (1962)
- "Multipoint Boundary Value Problem for Differential Equations with Deviating Argument" (1971)

=== Historical works and textbooks ===
- "Simple Differential Equations: A textbook for Universities" (1950)
- "From Oral Calculation To Machine Mathematics" (1959)
- "The History of the Development of Mathematics from Ancient Times to the beginning of the 17th Century" (1967)
- "Introduction to Higher Mathematics" (1984)

=== Mathematical biographies ===
- "Alexander Mikhailovich Lyapunov: [On the 30th Anniversary of his Death]" (1949)
- "Sofya Vasilievna Kovalevskaya: [To the 100th Anniversary of Birth]" (1950)
- "Konstantin Petrovich Persidskii: [On the occasion of his 50th Birthday]" (1954)
- "Sergei Lvovich Sobolev: [On the occasion of his 60th Birthday]" (1968)
- "Zhakan Suleimenovich Erzhanov: [On the occasion of the 50th Birthday]" (1972)
