= Zhamanzhol =

Zhamanzhol Жаманжол
- Selo
- Jamanjol
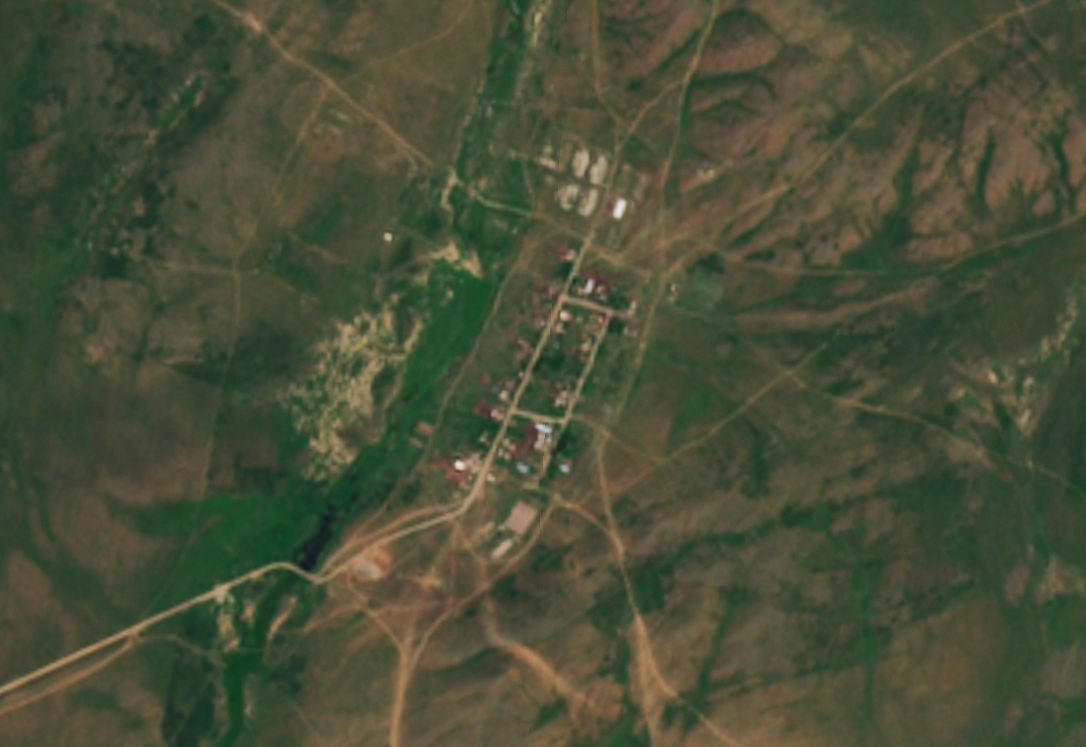
- Satellite image of the selo (Sentinel-2 L1C data, modified)

- Location in Kazakhstan
- Coordinates: 49°26′52″N 73°01′53″E
- Country: Kazakhstan
- Region: Karaganda Region
- District: Abay District

Population (2009)
  - Total: 168

Zhamanzhol (Kazakh: Жаманжол) is a selo in the Abay District of the Karaganda Region in Kazakhstan. It is a part of the Kulaigyr Rural District. Code CATO - 353261200.

== Population ==
In the year 1999, the population of the selo was 260 people (133 men and 127 women). According to the 2009 census, the population was 168 people (86 men and 82 women).
