= Ayagöz (river) =

River in Kazakhstan

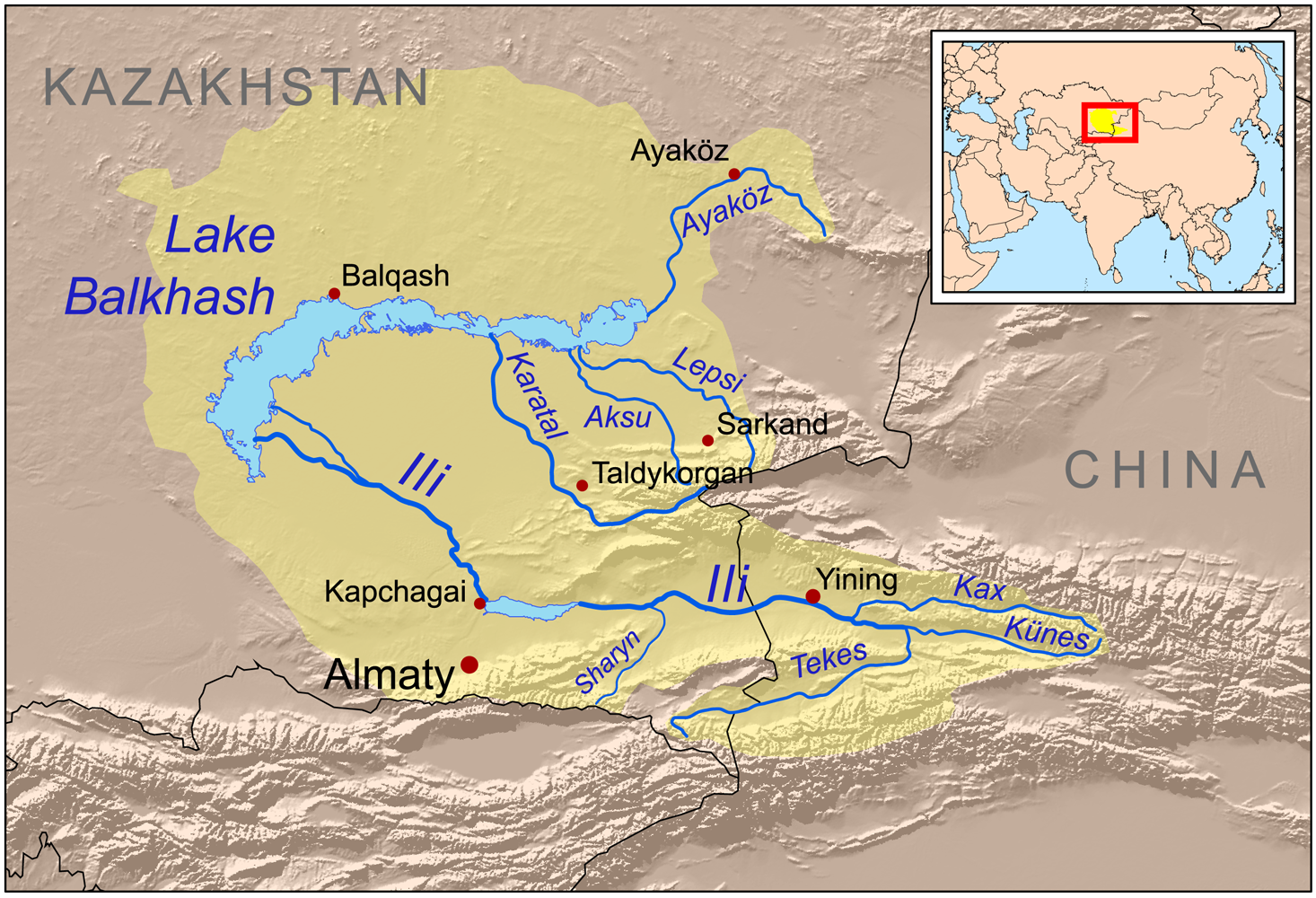
- Map of the Lake Balkhash drainage basin

Location
- Country: Kazakhstan

Physical characteristics
- Source
  - location: Tarbagatai Mountains
- Mouth
  - location: Lake Balkhash
  - coordinates: 46.6627°N 79.2373°E
- Length: 492 kilometres (306 mi)
- Basin size: 15,700 square kilometres (6,100 sq mi)

The Ayagöz (Kazakh: Аягөз) also spelled Ayaguz and Ayaköz, is a river of the Balkhash-Alakol Basin, Kazakhstan.

== Geography ==
The Ayagöz is fed by snowmelt from the Tarbagatai Mountains and is used for irrigation, flowing into the eastern end of Lake Balkash, although there is no longer much flow from the river into the lake. The city of Ayagöz is located on its banks. The river is 492 kilometres (306 mi) long and has a basin area of 15,700 square kilometres (6,100 sq mi).

View of Lake Balkhash from Space (August 2002)
The numbers mark the largest peninsulas, island and bays: 1. Saryesik peninsula —separating the lake into two parts —and Uzynaral Strait; 2. Baygabyl Peninsula; 3. Balai Peninsula; 4. Shaukar Peninsula; 5. Kentubek Peninsula; 6. Basaral and Ortaaral Islands; 7. Tasaral Island; 8. Shempek Bay; 9. Saryshagan Bay

== History ==
In 1717, Kaip Khan and Abul Khayr attacked the Dzungar Khanate but were defeated on the River Ayagöz.

Various Russian explorations took place in the area in the first half of the 19th century. Federoff explored the area in 1834. Between 1837 and 1843 the trans-Irtysh steppe as far as the Ayagöz River and Chu River was mapped on a scale of five versts to the inch. The shores of Lake Balkash were also surveyed and explored. Prince Gortchakoff, governor of Western Siberia, sent an officer named Assanoff in 1839 with some men to Lake Balkash to see if a fishing station could be established. He left Ayagöz and descended the river Ayagöz taking soundings, and fishing. He found two types of fish: marena and sudak, although not in large numbers, in the brackish water. The Kuzu Kerbetch tomb was found nearby and was said to be significant to the Kyrgyz population. Kuzu-Kerpetch was a Kyrgyz chief known from folk songs for valor and his love for Baian Sulu (who eventually caused his death)

== Fauna ==
The river's reedy lower section was once tiger habitat. The river turned up an Ordovician trilobite fossil, an Agerina acutilimbata (see list of trilobite genera), found by Ghobadi Pour et al. in 2011 in Katian, Karagech Formation on the east side of the Ajaguz River 7 kilometres (4 mi) north of Akchii village in the Tarbagatai Range.
