= Aksoran =

Mountain in Kazakhstan

- Ақсораң
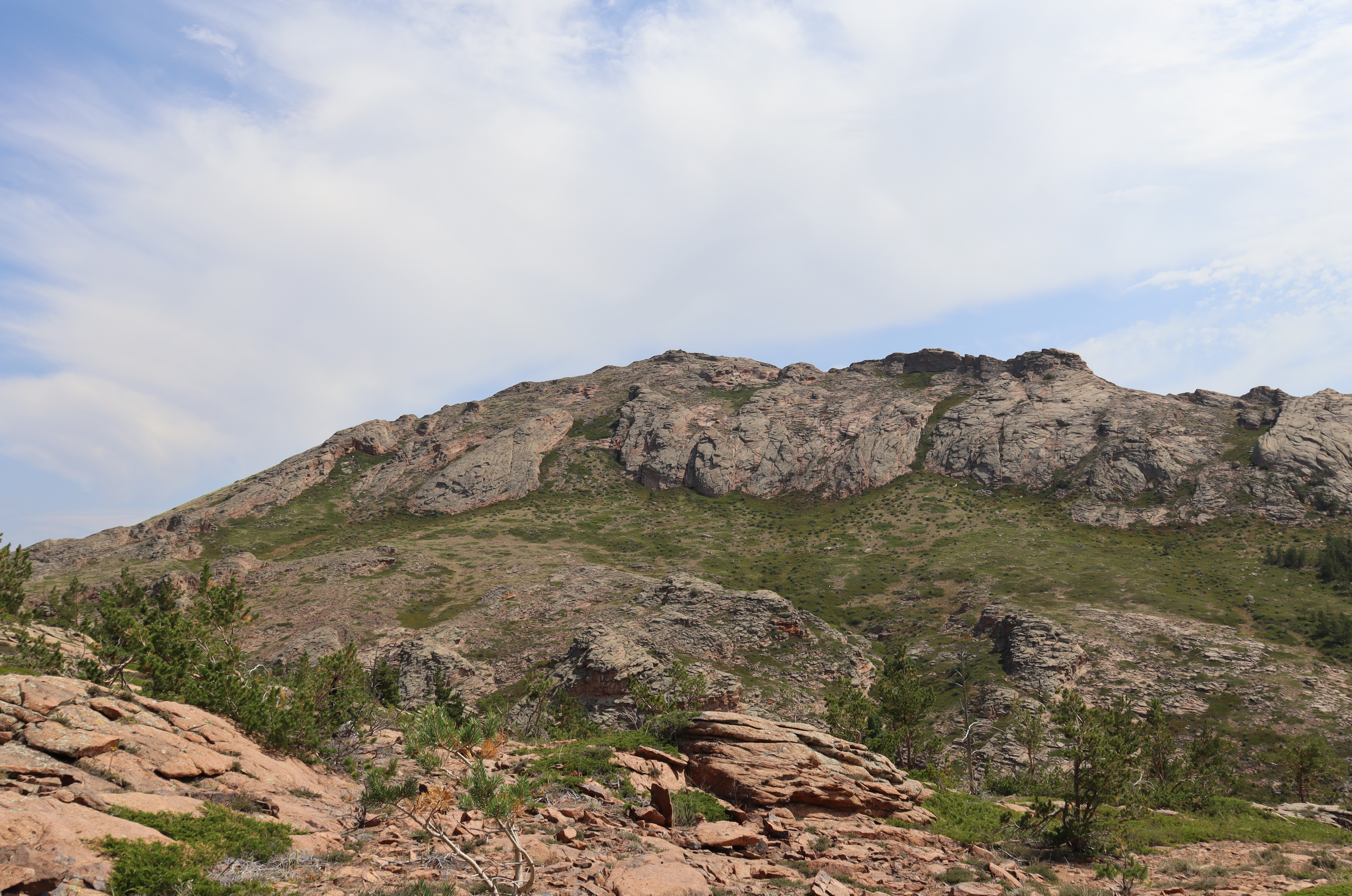
- Mt. Aksoran

Highest point
- Elevation: 1,565 m (5,135 ft)
- Prominence: 843 m (2,766 ft)
- Coordinates: 48°25′37″N 75°28′47″E

Geography
- Location within Kazakhstan
- Country: Kazakhstan
- Region: Karaganda Region
- District: Aktogay
- Parent range: Kyzylarai; Kazakh Uplands

Geology
- Rock age: Late Paleozoic
- Mountain type: Granite massif

Climbing
- Easiest route: from Shabanbay Bi

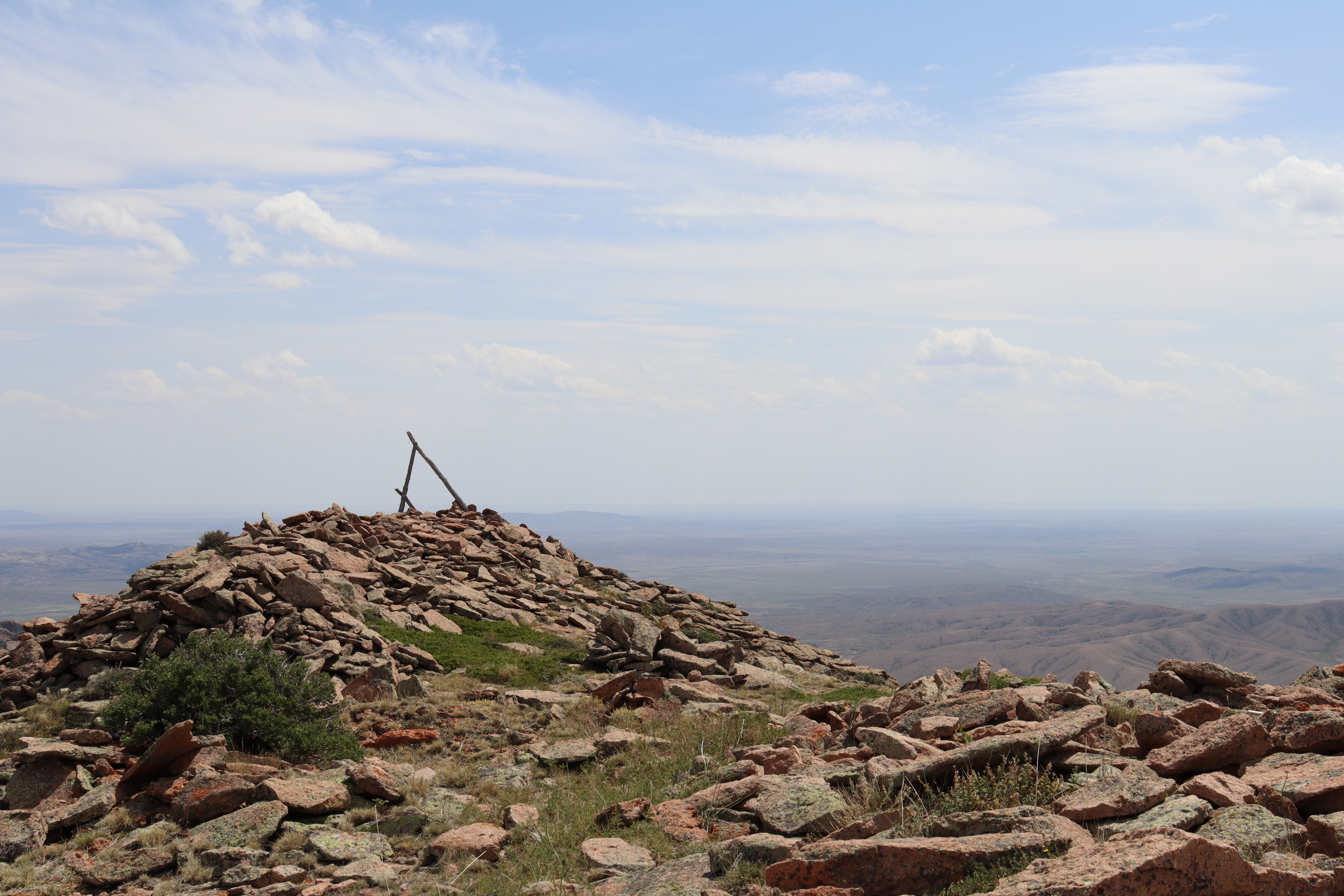
Summit of Mt. Aksoran

Aksoran (Kazakh: Ақсораң; Russian: Аксоран) is a mountain in Aktogay District, Karaganda Region, Kazakhstan.

The mountain is located about 10 kilometres (6 mi) to the ENE of Shabanbay Bi village, formerly known as Shilym. Geologically the peak is made up of Permian granite.

== Geography ==
Aksoran rises in the Kyzylarai, a massif of the Kazakh Uplands (Saryarka). The mountain has a barren appearance and its slopes are steep, rocky and strongly dissected.

With an elevation of 1,565 metres (5,135 ft), it is the highest mountain in the Kazakh Uplands, as well as the highest point of Central Kazakhstan.

The Kyzylarai massif extends approximately 70 km west–east and 50–60 km north–south across parts of the Karaganda Region. Aksoran has a topographic prominence of 843 metres, making it the dominant summit of the massif.

In clear weather, distant massifs such as Bektauata may be visible from the summit.

== Climate ==
Aksoran lies within the continental steppe climatic zone of Central Kazakhstan. Winters are cold, with average January temperatures around −15 °C, while summers are warm to hot, with July averages near 25 °C.

Annual precipitation averages between 300 and 400 mm, falling mainly in spring and early summer. Snow accumulation during winter contributes to seasonal runoff that feeds small intermittent streams in the surrounding uplands.

== Geology ==
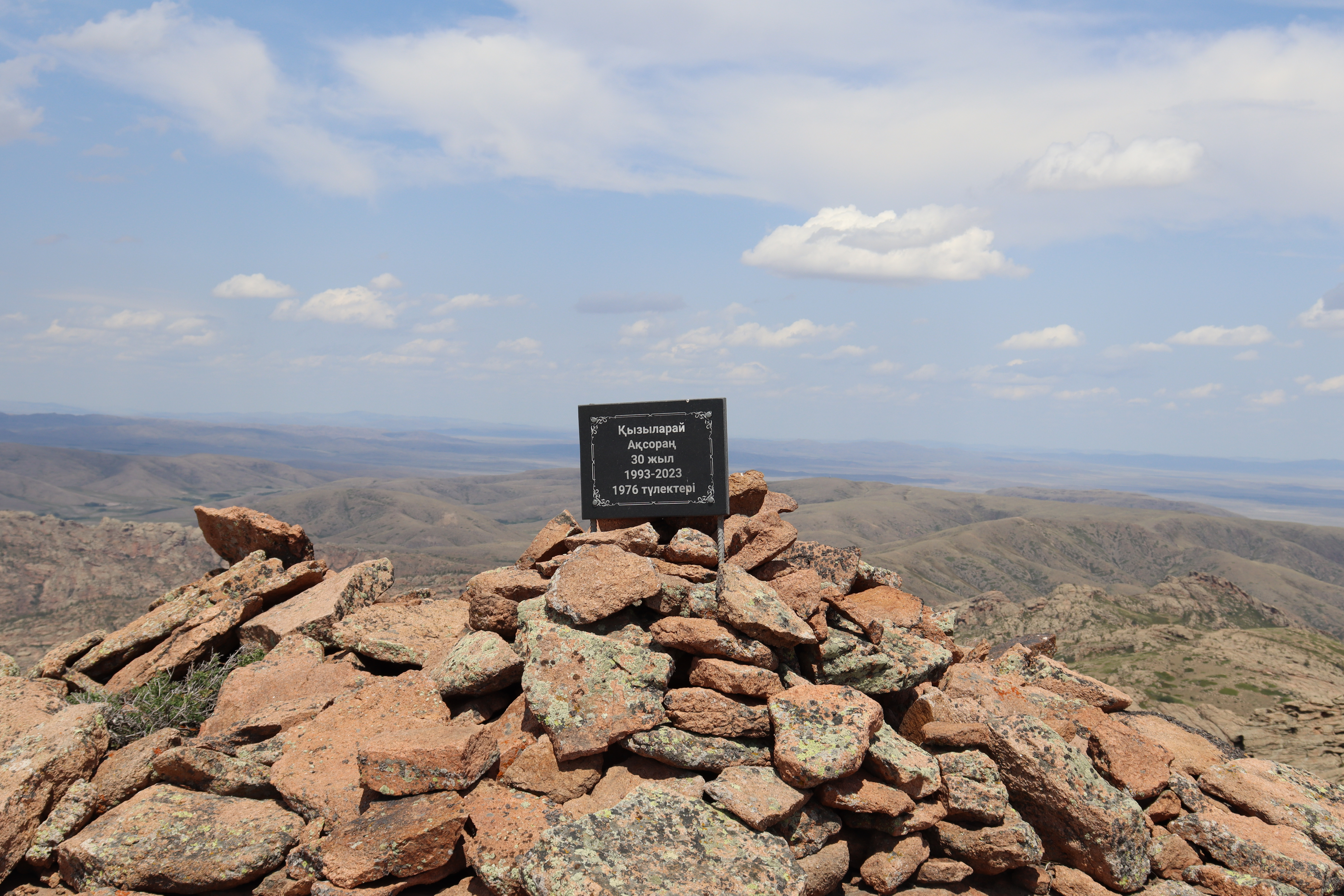
The plaque atop Aksoran

Aksoran consists primarily of Late Paleozoic granites formed during the Hercynian orogeny. These granitic intrusions are associated with tectonic processes that shaped the Kazakh Uplands during the Carboniferous–Permian period.

Surrounding formations include Devonian–Carboniferous sedimentary deposits such as limestones and terrigenous sequences that were later uplifted and intruded by granite bodies.

== Flora and fauna ==
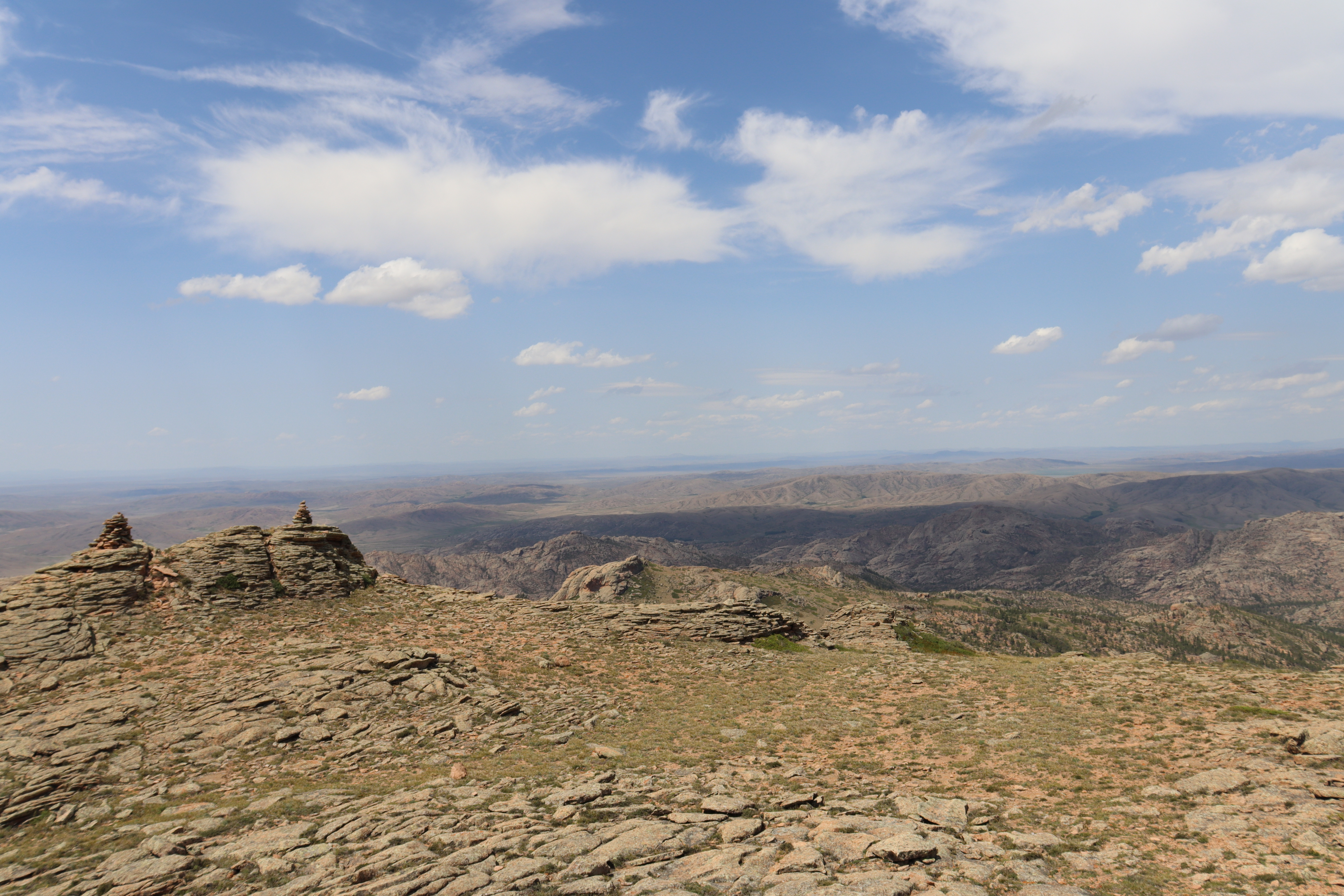
Western view from Aksoran

Vegetation in the Aksoran area is characteristic of the Kazakh steppe, with feather grass (Stipa) and wormwood (Artemisia) dominating lower elevations. Pine forests occur in parts of the Kyzylarai massif.

Wildlife includes argali (Ovis ammon), lynx (Lynx lynx), Pallas’s cat (Otocolobus manul), and red fox (Vulpes vulpes). Birds of prey such as the golden eagle (Aquila chrysaetos) and Eurasian eagle-owl (Bubo bubo) inhabit the region.

Several species present in the Kyzylarai region are listed in Kazakhstan’s Red Data Book of endangered species.

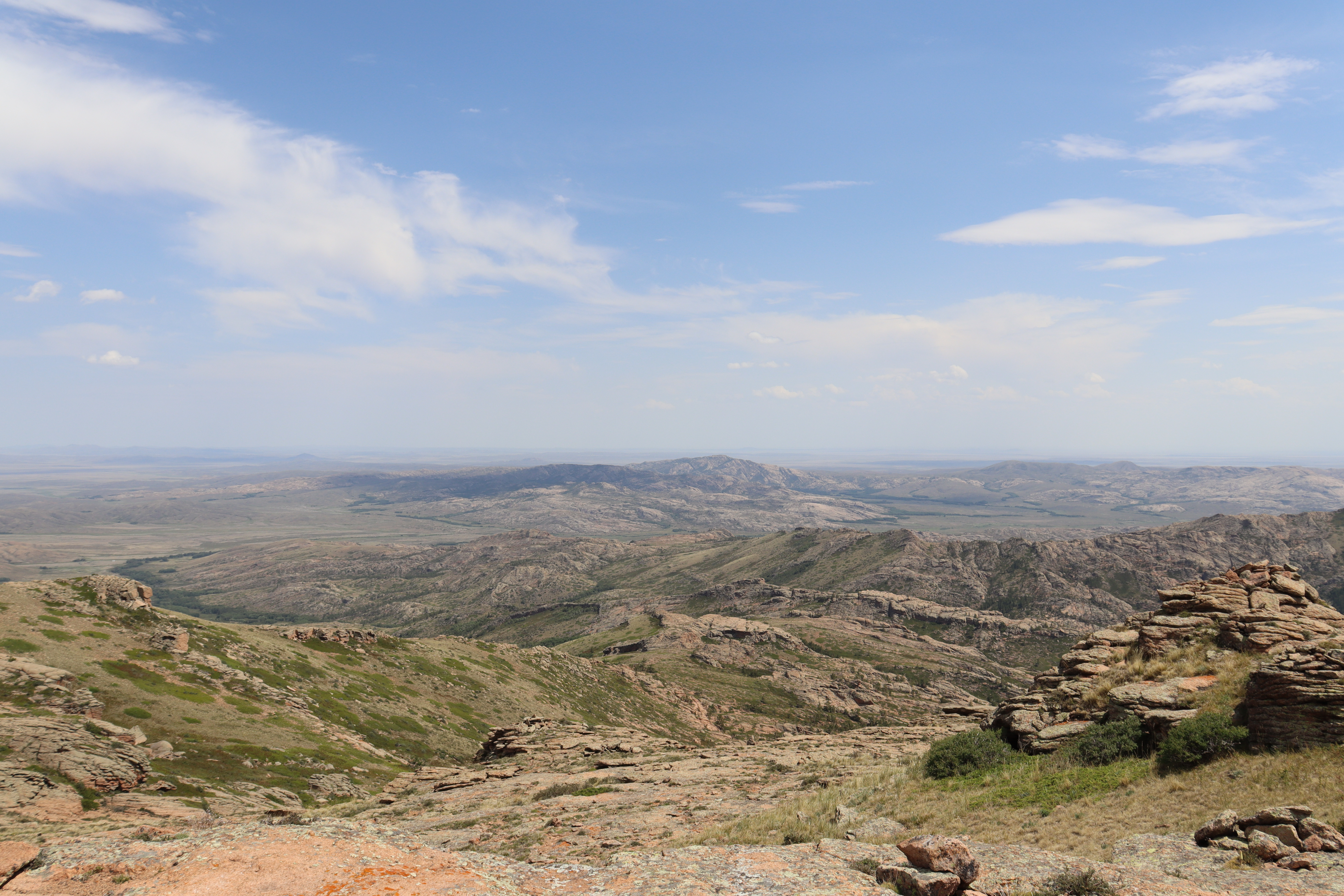
Eastern view from Aksoran

== Tourism ==
Aksoran is a destination for hiking and eco-tourism. The ascent from Shabanbay Bi involves approximately 560–600 metres of elevation gain, with a round trip typically taking between 4 and 8 hours.

Infrastructure is limited, and visitors generally rely on local guesthouses in Shabanbay Bi village.

== History ==
The Kyzylarai region shows evidence of human habitation dating back to the Bronze Age, including sites associated with the Begazy-Dandybay culture.

Historically, the mountain served as a landmark for Kazakh nomadic pastoralists who used the surrounding uplands for seasonal grazing.

== See also ==
- Geography of Kazakhstan
- Kazakh Uplands
- Kyzylarai
