= Tasaral Island =

Tasaral Island Тасарал
- Island
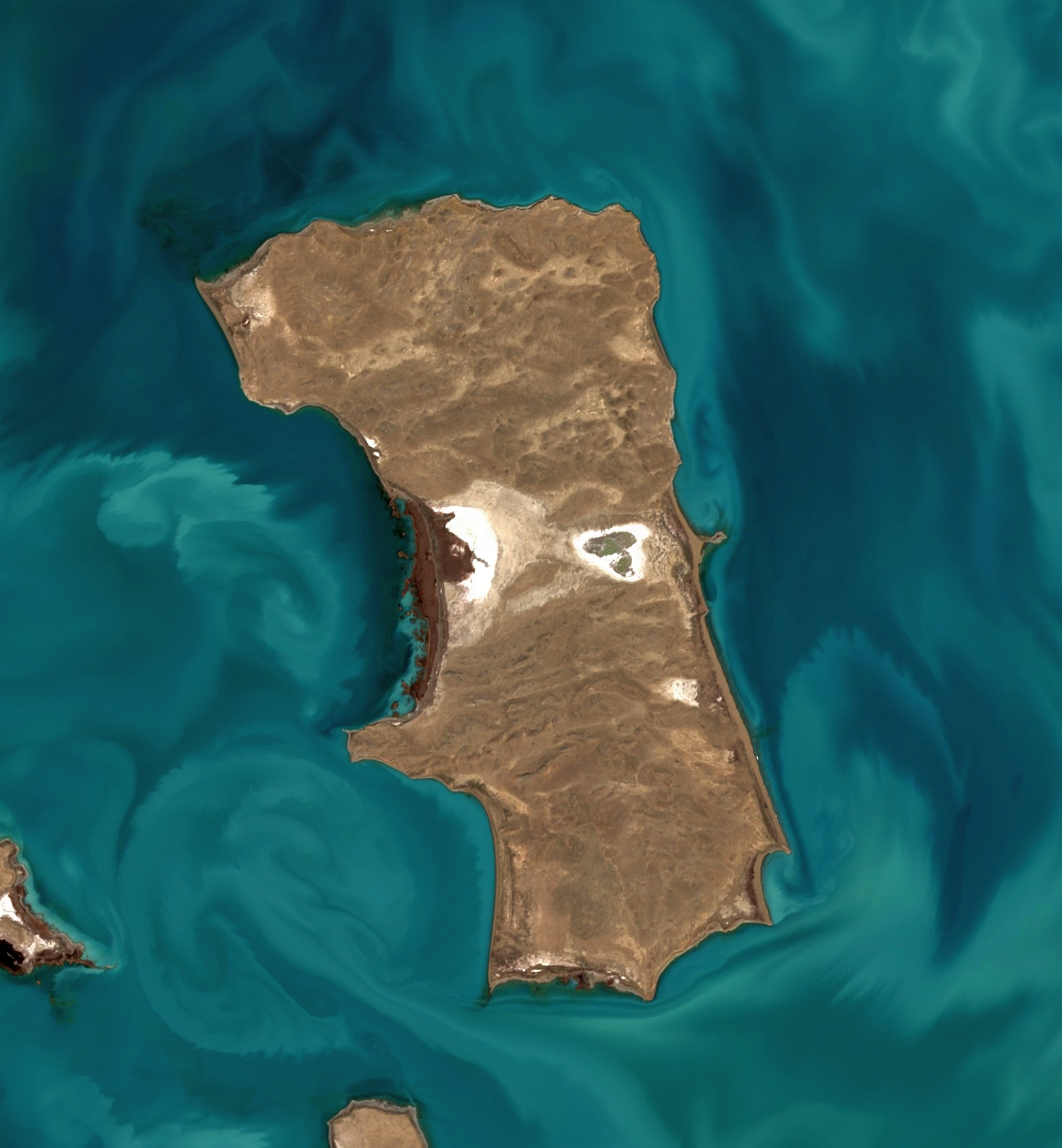

- Location within Kazakhstan
- Coordinates: 46°16′N 74°4′E
- Country: Kazakhstan
- Body of water: Lake Balkhash
- Region: Karaganda Region
- District: Aktogay District
- Elevation: 368 m (1,207 ft)

Population
  - Total: Uninhabited

Tasaral Island (Kazakh: Тасарал, Tasaral) is an island in the endorheic Lake Balkhash. It is located in the western part of the lake.

== Geography ==
Tasaral Island is located close to the shore, separated from it by a 1.7 km (1.1 mi) wide sound. It has a length of 8.2 km (5.1 mi), a maximum width of roughly 4 km (2.5 mi) and its maximum height reaches 368 m (1,207 ft). The shore of the island is rocky —'Tas' meaning "rock" and 'Aral' meaning "island"— with cliffs rising above the lake. Named after the island, the small town of Tasaral, founded in 1928 and dedicated mainly to fisheries, is located on the shore opposite the NW point of Tasaral Island.

Administratively, Tasaral Island belongs to the Aktogay District of the Karaganda Region of Kazakhstan.

View of Lake Balkhash from Space (August 2002)
The numbers mark the largest peninsulas, island and bays: 1. Saryesik peninsula —separating the lake into two parts— with Uzynaral Strait; 2. Baygabyl Peninsula; 3. Balai Peninsula; 4. Shaukar Peninsula; 5. Kentubek Peninsula; 6. Basaral and Ortaaral Islands; 7. Tasaral Island; 8. Shempek Bay; 9. Saryshagan Bay

== Fauna ==
The Central Asiatic frog (Rana asiatica) is one of the amphibians found on the island.

== See also ==
- List of islands of Kazakhstan
