= Sherubainura Reservoir =

Reservoir in Kazakhstan

- Шерубайнұра бөгені
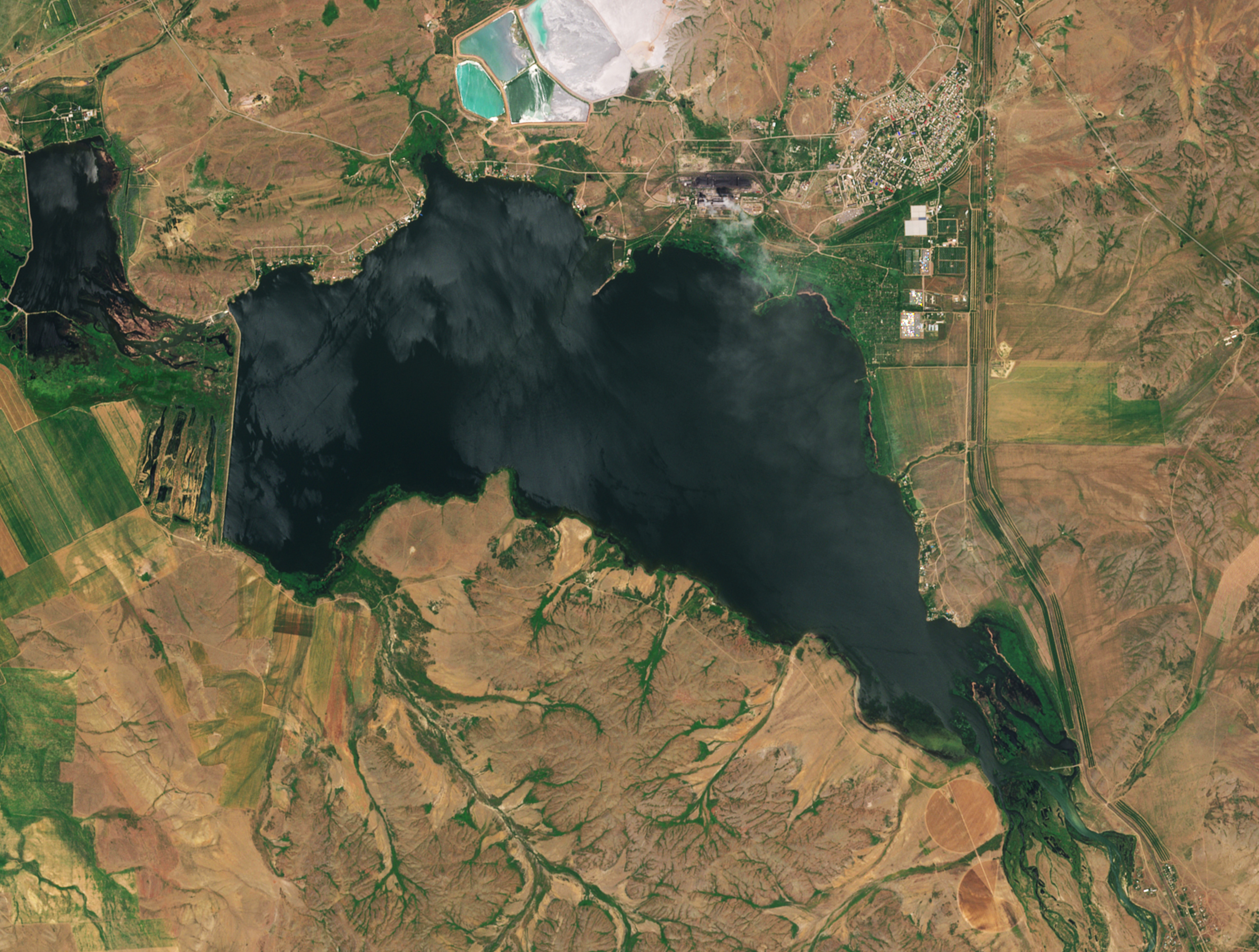
- A satellite image of the reservoir (modified Sentinel-2 L1C data)
- Interactive map of Sherubainura Reservoir
- Location: Karaganda Region, Kazakhstan
- Coordinates: 49°29′34″N 72°46′45″E
- Built: 1960
- Max. length: 13 km (8.1 mi)
- Max. width: 4.2 km (2.6 mi)
- Surface area: 39 km^{2} (15 sq mi)
- Max. depth: 24 m (79 ft)
- Surface elevation: 533.2 m (1,749 ft)

The Sherubainura Reservoir (Kazakh: Шерубайнұра бөгені, Russian: Шерубайнуринское водохранилище) is a reservoir in Kazakhstan. Its length is 13km and width is 4.2km.

The reservoir was formed in 1960. Its area is 39km^{2}, and its volume is 0.274km^{3}. It carries out long-term flow regulation. Used for energy (KarGRES-2) and irrigation, the height above sea level is 533.2 m.
