= Kaip Khan =

Kaip Khan was a Khan of Khiva (appears to be second Kaip Khan in the line). They were rivals of the Uzbek leader Abulkhair.

== See also ==
- Khiva
- Ayaguz River
