= Bektauata =

Range of mountains in Kazakhstan

- Бектауата
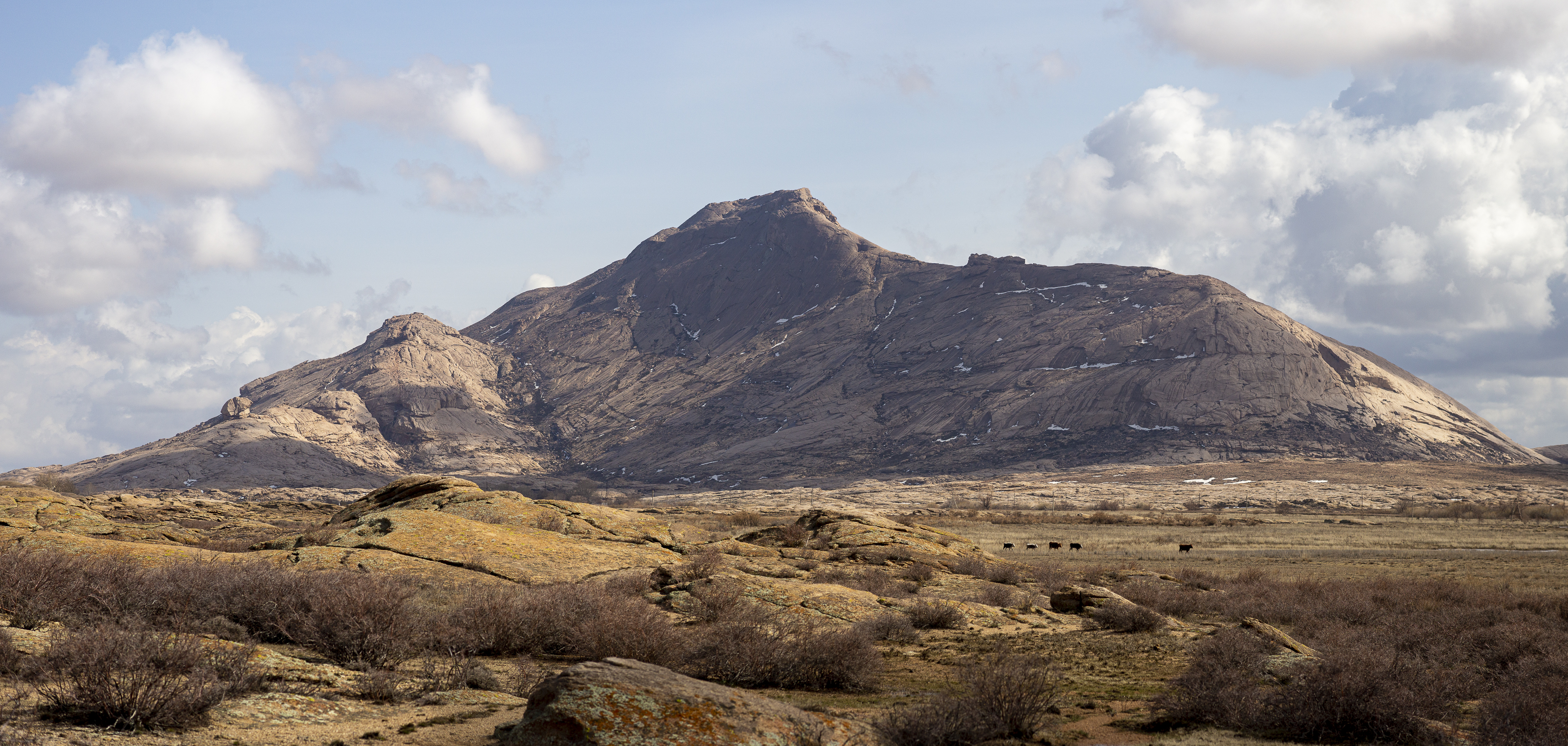
- View of the range from the M36 Highway

Highest point
- Peak: Bektauata Peak
- Elevation: 1,213 m (3,980 ft)

Dimensions
- Length: 15 km (9.3 mi) NE / SW
- Width: 11 km (6.8 mi) NW / SE

Geography
- Location within Kazakhstan
- Location: Kazakhstan
- Range coordinates: 47°27′N 74°47′E
- Parent range: Kazakh Uplands

Geology
- Orogeny: Alpine orogeny
- Rock age: Carboniferous
- Rock type: Granite

Climbing
- Easiest route: From Balkhash City

Bektauata (Kazakh: Бектауата) is a mountain range in Aktogay District, Karaganda Region, Kazakhstan.

Balkhash City is located less than 70 kilometers (43 mi) to the south of the range and the M36 Highway passes to the west of it. The range is part of the Bektauata State Zoological Nature Sanctuary, a IUCN Category IV protected area. There is a campsite in one of the valleys of the range.

== History ==
The Bektauata burial ground is an early Iron Age archaeological site, belonging to the Tasmola culture. A gold earring with a fixed cone-shaped pendant decorated with granulation was found in one of the ancient mounds.

== Geography ==
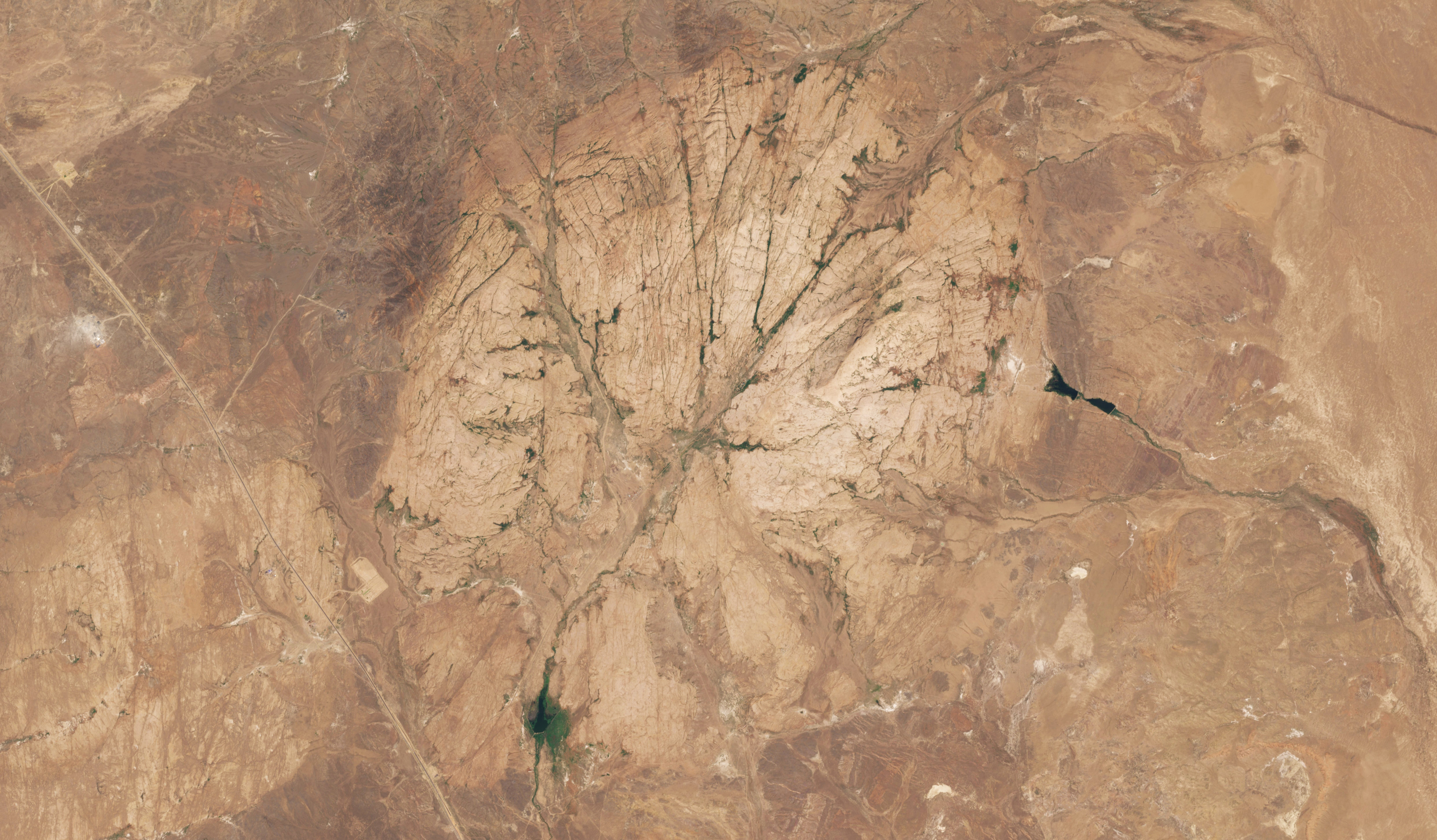
Bektauata as seen from space (Sentinel-2 L1C data, modified)

Bektauata is a small rocky range of moderate altitude located at the southern end of the Kazakh Upland system (Saryarka). The dry alluvial plain at the mouth of the Tokrau river lies to the east of the range. The nearest airport is Balkhash Airport. There are rock formations, caves and rock pools in different spots of the Bektauata area. The largest cave is 48 meters (157 ft) in length. The inner part of the cave is full of water to a depth of 1.5 meters (4 ft 11 in).

The highest point of the Bektauata is a 1,213 meters (3,980 ft) high summit named after the range. Other important peaks are Sarykulzha —1,082 meters (3,550 ft), two-peaked Konyrkulzha —976 meters (3,202 ft) (western summit), Karashoky —893 meters (2,930 ft) and Zhaltas —824 meters (2,703 ft).

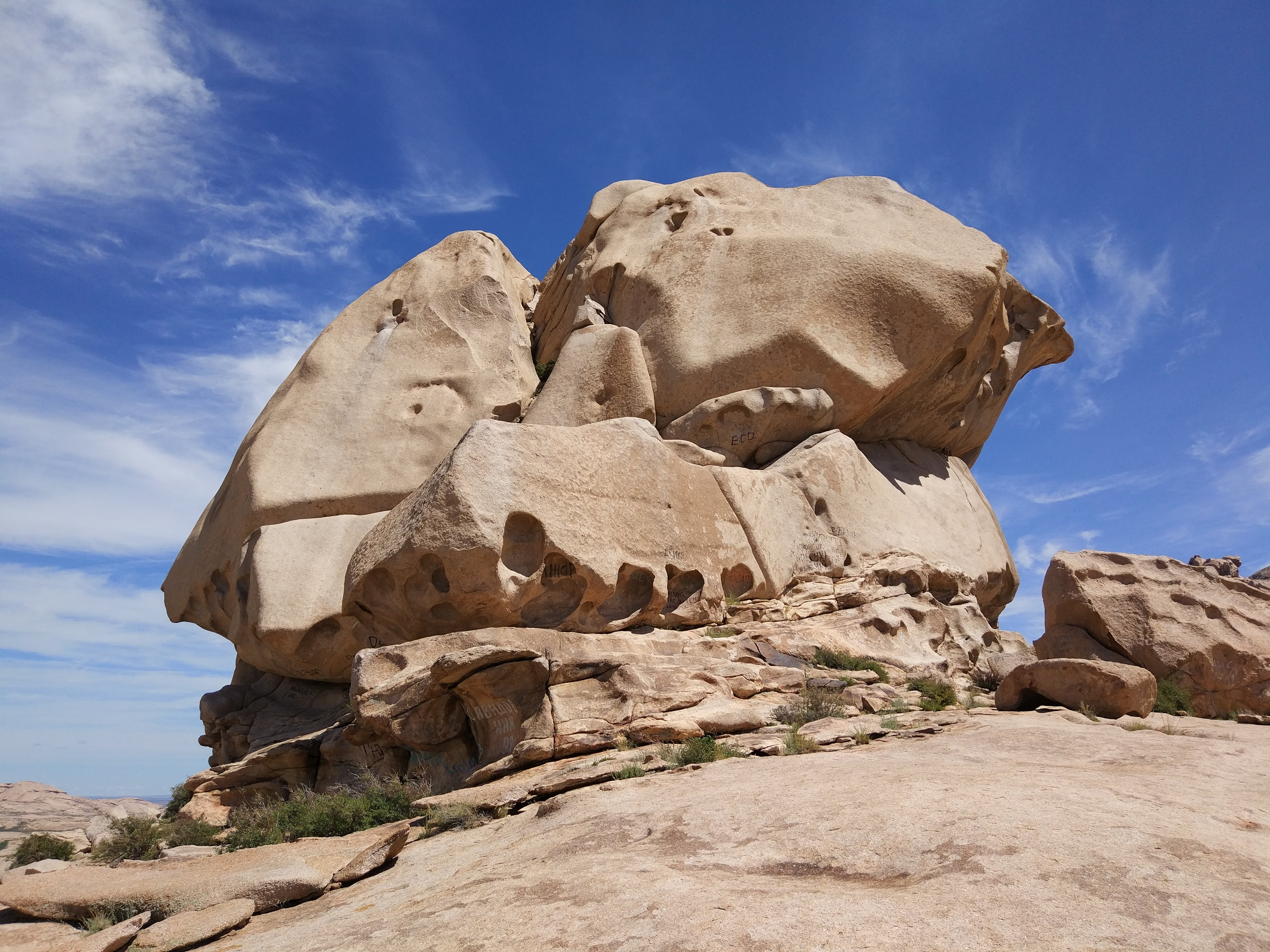
A rock formation.

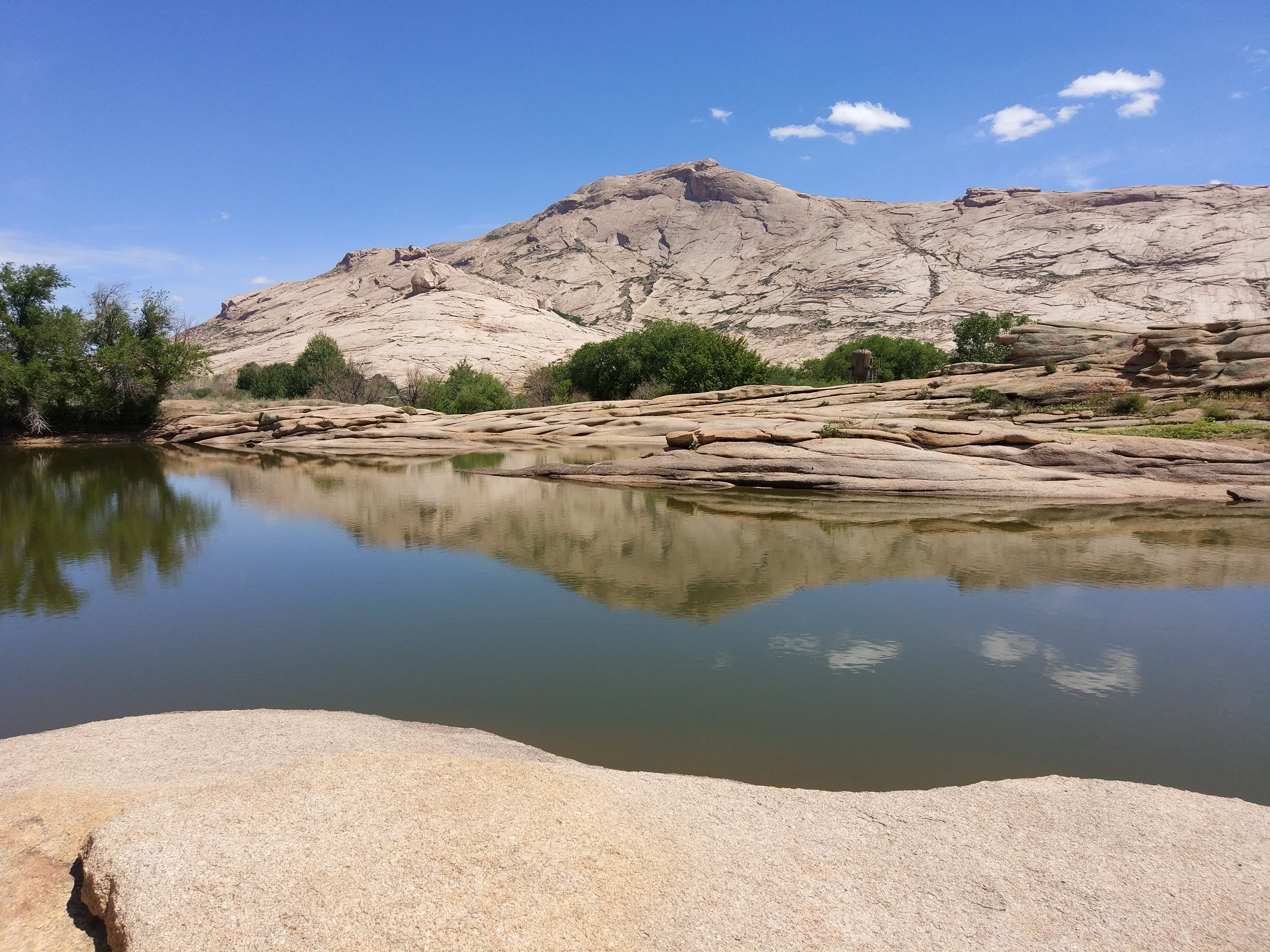
A rock pool.

== Flora ==
There is almost no vegetation on the slopes of the range, which are bare and rocky. In the valleys and by some of the rockpools there is tree growth, including aspen and willow, as well as shrubs.

== See also ==
- Geography of Kazakhstan
- Barrows of Tasmola
