= Zhanatogan =

Zhanatogan Жаңатоған
- Selo
- Zhañatoğan
- Location of the village in Kazakhstan
- Coordinates: 48°58′17″N 74°51′12″E
- Country: Kazakhstan
- Region: Karaganda Region

Population (2009)
  - Total: 694
- Postal code: 100811
- Area code: +7 72416

Zhanatogan (Kazakh: Жаңатоған) is a selo in the Karkaraly District of the Karaganda Region in Kazakhstan. It is the administrative centre of the Zhanatogan Village District.

== Population ==
In the year 1999, the population of the selo was 975 people (489 men and 468 women). According to the 2009 census, there were 694 people (343 men and 351 women).
