= Spirkin Oseredok Island =

Spirkin Oseredok Спиркин Осерёдок
- Island
- Location within Caspian Sea
- Coordinates: 46°27′N 49°53′E
- Country: Kazakhstan
- Region: Atyrau Region

Spirkin Oseredok Island is a low, flat island in the Caspian Sea. It is located east of the mouths of the Volga.

Spirkin Oseredok is separated from the Kazakh coast by a 700 m wide channel. It has a length of 5.2 km and a maximum width of 3.9 km.

Administratively, Spirkin Oseredok Island belongs to Atyrau Region of Kazakhstan.

Zhanbay Aral, one of the largest islands in the area, lies 10 km to the south southwest beyond a headland.
