= Saran, Kazakhstan =

Saran Саран
- City
- Coat of arms

- Location in Karagandy Province, Kazakhstan
- Coordinates: 49°47′N 72°51′E
- Country: Kazakhstan
- Region: Karaganda Region
- Founded: December 20, 1954

Government
  - Akim: Daryn Bulkair
  - Summer (DST): UTC+6 (UTC+6)

Saran (Kazakh: Саран, romanized: Saran; Russian: Сарань) is a city in Karaganda Region of Kazakhstan, on the Nura River. Population: 42,058 (2009 census results); 42,957 (1999 census results). The city was founded on December 20, 1954.

== Location ==
Saran is located in Karaganda oblast (region) of Kazakhstan, situated about 15 km from Karaganda city. Saran is a significant center of coal extraction due to the Karaganda coal deposit. There are coal-processing sites, concrete goods plants, and brickworks in Saran city. There is also a teachers' training institute here.

== Monuments ==
There are various monuments in Saran:

- Military Glory Obelisk. It was erected on the 40th anniversary of the Soviet people's victory in World War II. It is located in the square on Rabochaya street.
- Victory Obelisk. It was erected in 1975 in honor of the 30th anniversary of victory.
- Zhambyl Zhabayev bust. Zhambyl Zhabayev is a well-known Kazakh poet. The monument was erected in 1973 on Zhambyl street.
- Alexander Sergeyevich Pushkin bust. Pushkin is a famous Russian writer, founder of new Russian literature and literary language. The bust was erected at the school #4 in honor of his 157th anniversary.
- Arkadiy Gaidar bust. Arkadiy Gaidar was a Soviet writer. The bust was erected at the boarding school in 1972.
- Monument to V.V. Mayakovsky – famous Soviet poet. Mayakovsky is depicted as if he is reciting poems on the tribune. It was erected in 1961 at the House of Culture at mine “Aktasskaya”, settlement Aktas.
- Monument to Vladimir Ilyich Lenin. It was erected in 1970 in honor of his 100th anniversary at the location of local military unit.
- Mazar of Igilik Utepov bai. This is a monument of history and architecture. It is located in the industrial area of Saran. the mazar is an example of dome funeral buildings of 19th century in the territory of Central Kazakhstan.
