= Abay (town) =

Abay Абай Abai
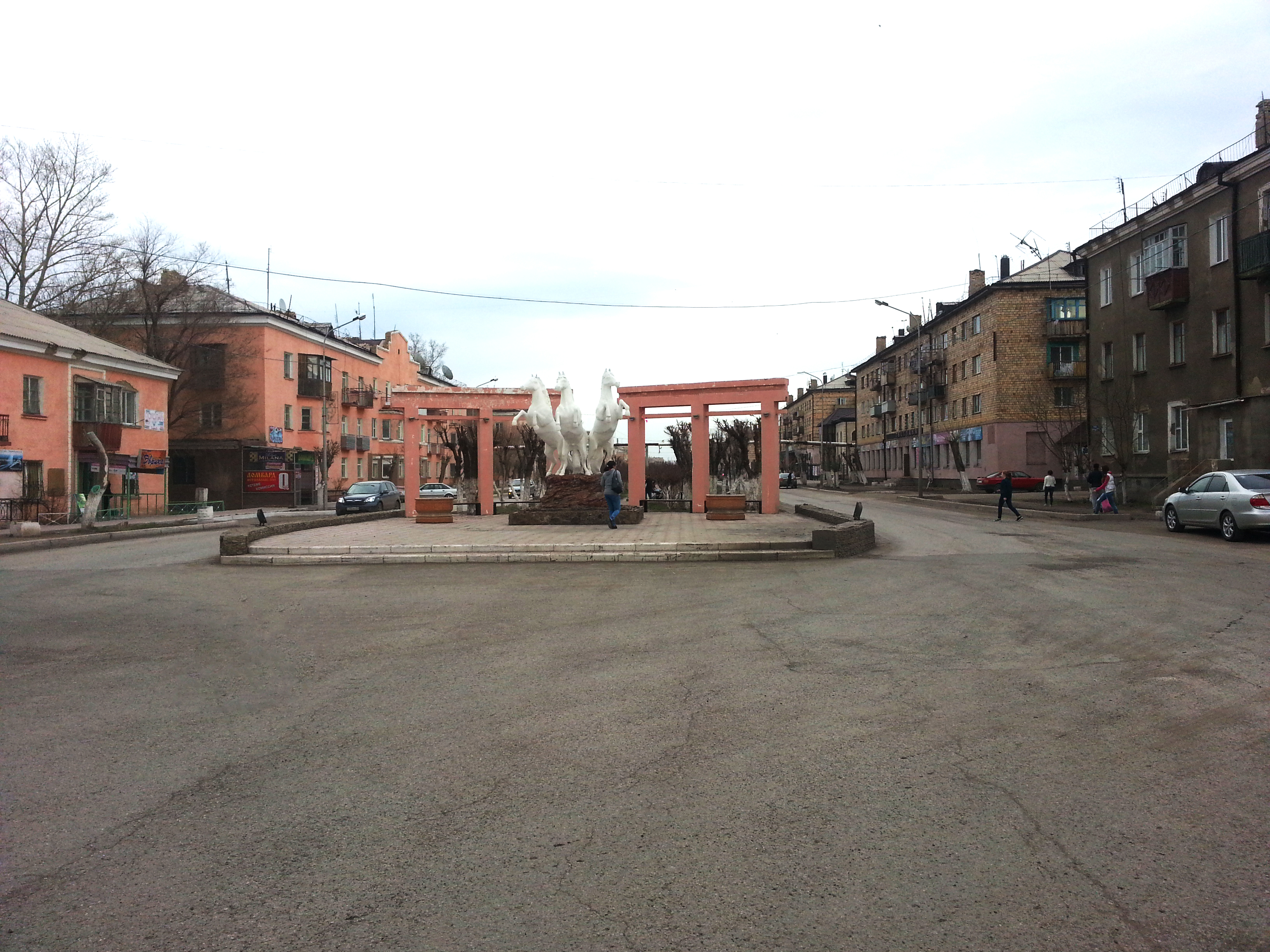

- Location in Kazakhstan Abay (Asia)
- Coordinates: 49°37′52″N 72°51′14″E
- Country: Kazakhstan
- Region: Karaganda Region
- District: Abay District
- Founded: 1949
- Re-Named and Re-Classified as a "City": 1961

Government
  - Akim (mayor): Sabit Ospanov

Population (1 Jan 2009)
  - Total: 25,550
- Time zone: UTC+6 (ALMT)
- Postal code: 100100-100130
- Area code: +7 331 31

Abay (Kazakh: Абай, Abai) is a town (since 1961) located in central Kazakhstan, and has served as the capital of Abay District in Karaganda Region since 2002. Population: 25,550 (2009 census results); 33,066 (1999 census results).

Abay was founded in 1949 as a coal mining settlement with the name Sherubay-Noora (Kazakh: Шерубай-Нұра, Şerubai-Nūra; Russian: Чурубай-Нура, Churubay-Nura). In 1961, it was renamed Abay, after Abay Qunanbayuli, a Kazakh poet, composer and philosopher.

== Sport ==
In 2014 a team from Abay participated in the national championships in bandy for junior players born in, or later than 1996.
