= Bolshiye Peshnye Islands =

Bolshiye Peshnye Islands Большие Пешные острова
- Island group
- Interactive map of Bolshiye Peshnye Islands
- Location within Caspian Sea
- Coordinates: 46°47′N 51°44′E
- Country: Kazakhstan
- Region: Atyrau Region

The Bolshiye Peshnye Islands (Ostrova Bol'shiye Peshnye) is a group of two small islands in the Caspian Sea. It is located 7 km off the coast, 15 km SSE of Peshnoy.

The Bolshiye Peshnye Islands are 2.5 km away from each other. The northern island has a length of 2 km and a maximum width of 0.7 km. The crescent-shaped southern island is 3.2 km long and only 400 m wide on average.

Administratively the Bolshiye Peshnye Islands belong to Atyrau Region of Kazakhstan.
