= Basaral =

Basaral Island Басарал
- Island
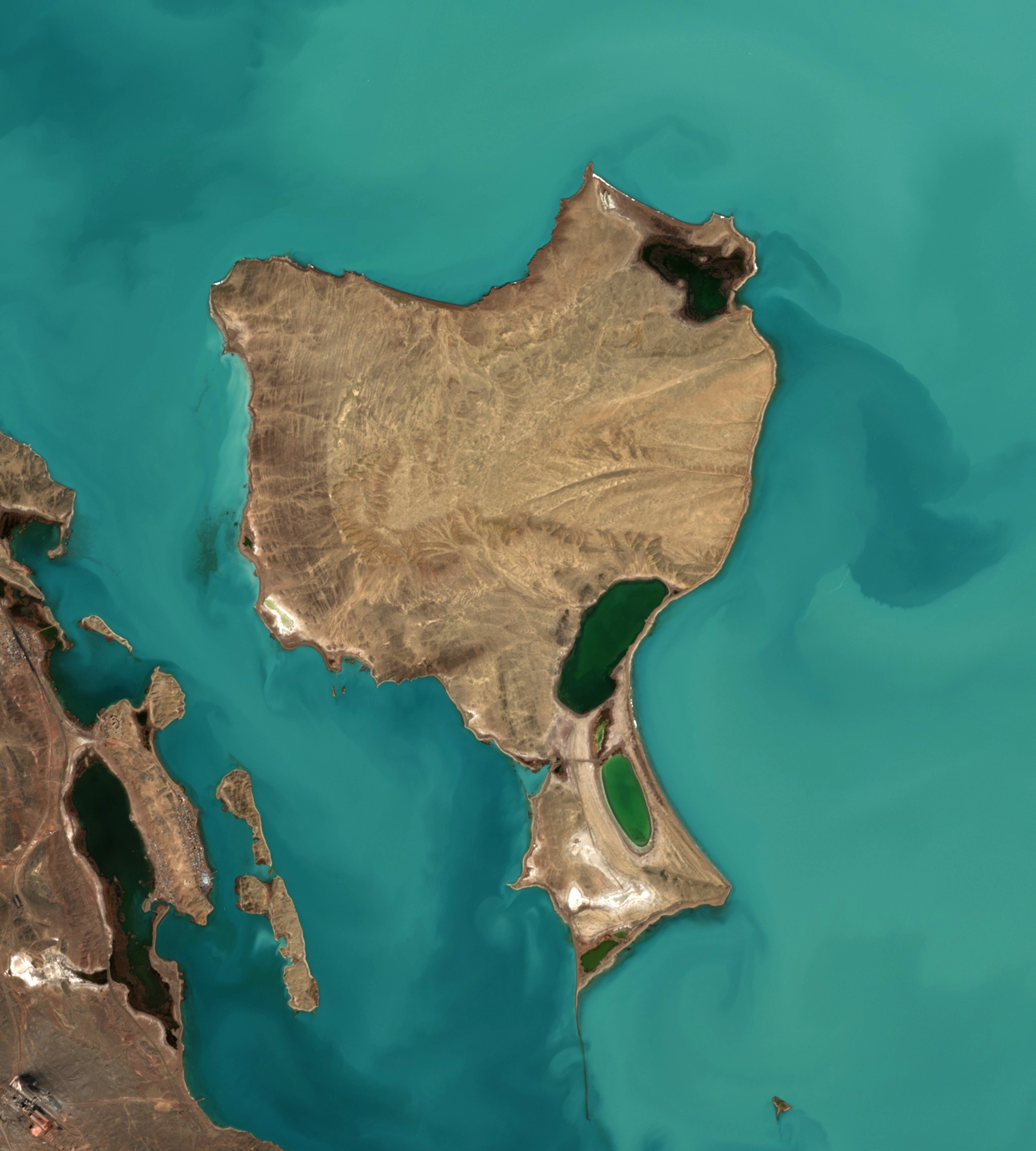

- Location within Kazakhstan
- Coordinates: 45°28′N 73°43′E
- Country: Kazakhstan
- Body of water: Lake Balkhash
- Region: Jambyl Region
- Elevation: 393 m (1,289 ft)

Population
  - Total: Uninhabited

Basaral (Kazakh: Басарал, Basaral) is an island in Lake Balkhash in Kazakhstan. It is located in the southwestern portion of the lake.

== Geography ==
Basaral is located close to the shore, separated from it by a 2.5 km (1.6 mi) wide sound. It has a length of a little over 11 km (6.8 mi) and a maximum width of roughly 7 km (4.3 mi). Ortaaral is a similar smaller island located to the southeast of Basaral's southern end. The shore of the island is rocky and its maximum height reaches 393 m (1,289 ft). The vegetation is sparse and mainly composed of Salsola, Caragana and Anabasis scrub.

Administratively, Basaral Island belongs to the Moiynkum District of the Jambyl Region of Kazakhstan.

View of Lake Balkhash from Space (August 2002)
The numbers mark the largest peninsulas, island and bays: 1. Saryesik peninsula —separating the lake into two parts —and Uzynaral Strait; 2. Baygabyl Peninsula; 3. Balai Peninsula; 4. Shaukar Peninsula; 5. Kentubek Peninsula; 6. Basaral and Ortaaral Islands; 7. Tasaral Island; 8. Shempek Bay; 9. Saryshagan Bay

== See also ==
- List of islands of Kazakhstan
