= Tokrau =

River in Kazakhstan

Tokrau Тоқырау
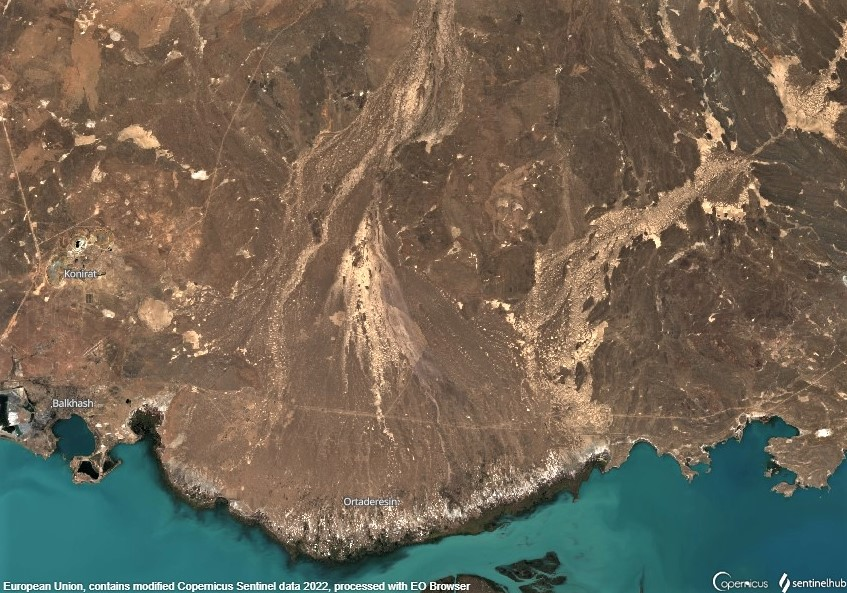
- Last stretch of the Tokrau river Sentinel-2 image

- Mouth location in Kazakhstan

Location
- Country: Kazakhstan

Physical characteristics
- Source: Kyzyltas
  - coordinates: 48°48′09″N 74°58′26″E
  - elevation: 901 m (2,956 ft)
- Mouth: Balkhash-Alakol Basin
  - location: North of Balkhash lakeshore
  - coordinates: 46°59′03″N 75°23′24″E
  - elevation: 374 m (1,227 ft)
- Length: 298 km (185 mi)
- Basin size: 21,100 km^{2} (8,100 sq mi)
- Discharge
  - average: 2.55 m^{3}/s (90 cu ft/s) near Aktogay village

The Tokrau (Kazakh: Тоқырау) is a river in Karaganda Region, Kazakhstan. It has a length of 298 km (185 mi) and a drainage basin of 21,100 km^{2} (8,100 sq mi).

The Tokrau flows by Aktogay, the administrative center of Aktogay District, Karaganda Region, as well as by Saryterek village. Its mouth lies northeast of Balkhash City and east of the Bektauata range. The Egizkoytas burial complex of the Bronze Age and Early Iron Age is located in the upper course of the river.

The Tokrau Formation, a fossiliferous stratigraphic unit in Kazakhstan whose strata date back to the Paleozoic, was named after the river.

== Course ==
The Tokrau river originates in the Kyzyltas range of the southern Kazakh Uplands, 10 km (6.2 mi) to the north of Mt Karashoki. It heads roughly southwards within a narrow channel all along its course. Its valley may reach 10 km (6.2 mi) at its widest, narrowing to 75 m (246 ft) in gorges. The floodplain is between 1 km (0.62 mi) and 1.2 km (0.75 mi) wide. About 50 km (31 mi) away from the coast of Lake Balkhash to the south, the river fans out into many arms in a dry, widening plain. Finally its waters disperse in the semidesert sands to the north of the lakeshore. This last stretch of the Tokrau was an ancient delta dating back to the time when the river reached Lake Balkhash.

The Tokrau is fed mainly by winter snows. Its water is fresh and the river channel fills between March and May, although less often it may fill in late autumn too. The lower stretch frequently dries up, stagnating into disconnected pools. Very rarely, in years of abundant spring floods, the waters of the river may break through the desert area and trickle into the endorheic lake Balkhash.

=== Tributaries ===
The main tributaries of the Tokrau are the Zhalanash, the 73 km (45 mi) long Karamende, the Kosabai, the Karatal and the 65 km (40 mi) long Zhinishke.

== See also ==
- List of fossiliferous stratigraphic units in Kazakhstan
- List of rivers of Kazakhstan
