= Pushnoy =

Pushnoy (Russian: Пушной; masculine), Pushnaya (Пушная; feminine), or Pushnoye (Пушное; neuter) is the name of several rural localities in Russia:

- Pushnoy, Republic of Karelia, a settlement in Belomorsky District of the Republic of Karelia
- Pushnoy, Murmansk Oblast, an inhabited locality in Pushnovsky Territorial Okrug of Kolsky District in Murmansk Oblast
- Pushnoy, Novosibirsk Oblast, a settlement in Cherepanovsky District of Novosibirsk Oblast
- Pushnoye, Republic of Khakassia, a selo in Pushnovsky Selsoviet of Bogradsky District in the Republic of Khakassia
- Pushnoye, Leningrad Oblast, a logging depot settlement under the administrative jurisdiction of Roshchinskoye Settlement Municipal Formation in Vyborgsky District of Leningrad Oblast
