= Abay District, Karaganda Region =

Coordinates: 49.631°N 72.838°E

Abay
- District
- Абай ауданы
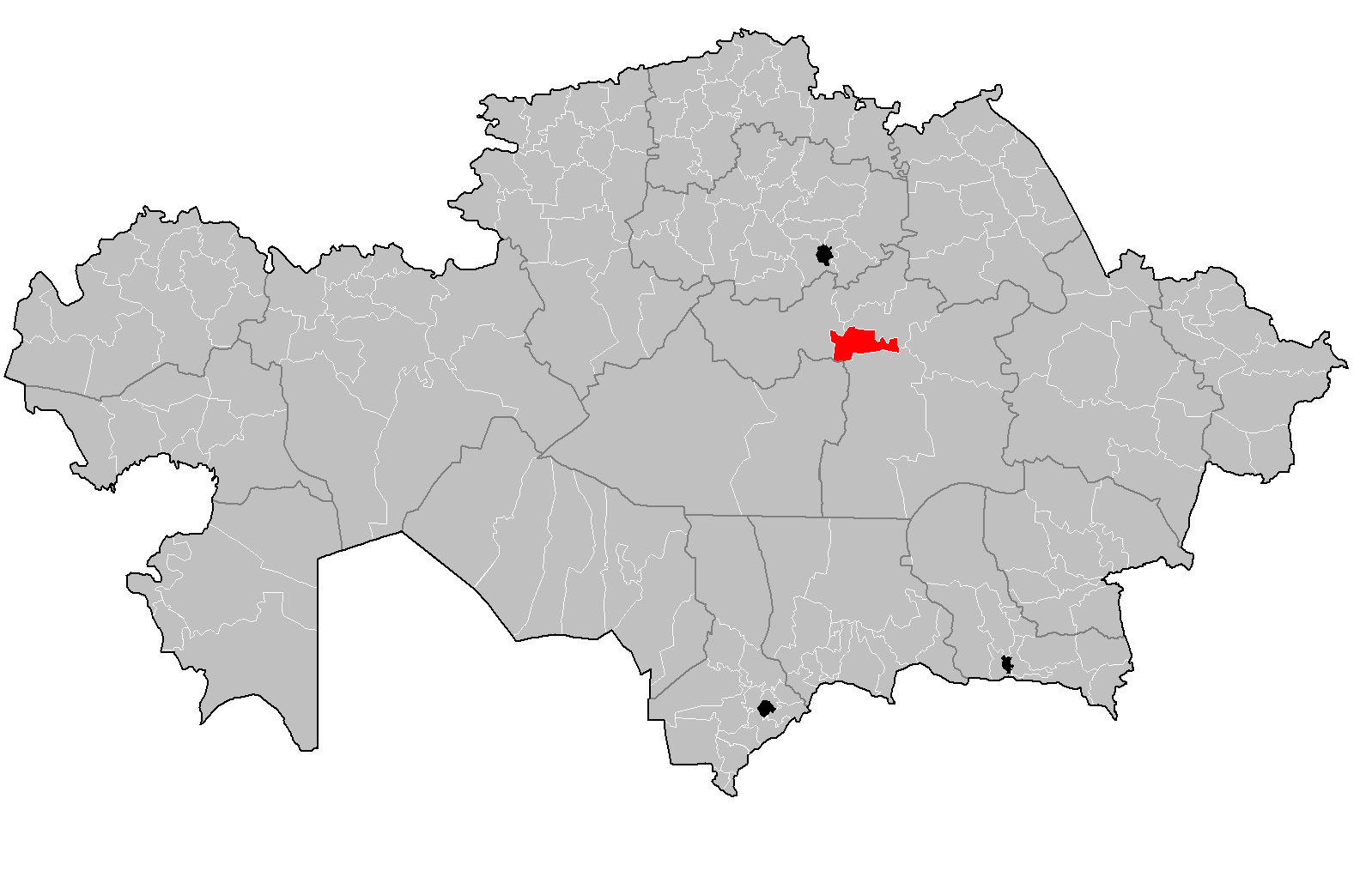
- Country: Kazakhstan
- Region: Karaganda Region
- Administrative center: Abay
- Founded: 1973

Government
  - Akim: Asanov Baurzhan Konirbaevich

Area
  - Total: 25,000 sq mi (65,000 km^{2})

Population (2019)
  - Total: 58 673
- Time zone: UTC+6 (East)

Abay District (Kazakh: Абай ауданы, Abai audany) is a district of Karaganda Region in central Kazakhstan. The administrative center of the district is the town of Abay. Population: 54,057 (2013 estimate); 53,214 (2009 census results); 65,306 (1999 census results).

== History ==
Abay District was formed in March 21, 1973, under the name Michurinsky District, with the administrative center in the settlement of Topar. In 1997 it was renamed 'Abaysky' District and its administrative center was moved to the town of Abay.

== Population ==
The population is 58,673 (2019)

National composition (at the beginning of 2019):

- Russians – 23,587 people (40.20%)
- Kazakhs – 23,195 people (39.53%)
- Ukrainians – 3168 people (5.40%)
- Tatars – 2155 people (3.67%)
- Germans – 1981 people (3.38%)
- Belarusians – 1047 people (1.78%)
- Bashkirs – 471 people. (0.80%)
- Chechens – 424 people (0.72%)
- Azerbaijanis – 442 people (0.75%)
- Koreans – 293 people (0.50%)
- Poles – 199 people (0.34%)
- Chuvash people – 121 people (0.21%)
- Lithuanians – 159 people (0.27%)
- Moldovans – 157 people (0.27%)
- Uzbeks – 228 people (0.39%)
- Mordva – 100 people (0.17%)
- Greeks – 23 people (0.40%)
- others – 923 people (1.57%)
- Total – 58,673 people (100.00%)
