= Aktogay, Karaganda Region =

Aktogay Ақтоғай
- Village
- Location in Kazakhstan
- Coordinates: 48°18′52″N 74°58′37″E
- Country: Kazakhstan
- Region: Karaganda Region
- District: Aktogay District
- Founded: 1926

Population (2019)
  - Total: 2,770
- Time zone: UTC+6 (East Kazakhstan Time)
- Post code: 100200

Aktogay (Kazakh: Ақтоғай) is a village in Aktogay District, Karaganda Region, Kazakhstan. It is the administrative center of the Aktogay District, as well as the only settlement of the Aktogay Rural District (KATO code - 353630100). Population: 3,145 (2009 census results); 4,186 (1999 census results).

== Population ==
In 1999, the population of the village was 4,186 people (2,140 men and 2,046 women). According to the 2009 census, 3,145 people lived in the village (1,568 men and 1,577 women).

At the beginning of 2019, the population of the village was 2,770 people (1,415 men and 1,355 women).

== Geography ==
Aktogay is located by the right bank of the Tokrau river, about 270 kilometers (170 mi) southeast of Karaganda. The nearest railway station is Balkhash City, located 190 kilometers (120 mi) to the south.

=== Climate ===
Climate data for Aqtogay (1991–2020)
Month	Jan	Feb	Mar	Apr	May	Jun	Jul	Aug	Sep	Oct	Nov	Dec	Year
Mean daily maximum °C (°F)	−11.9 (10.6)	−10.0 (14.0)	−1.5 (29.3)	12.5 (54.5)	20.4 (68.7)	25.7 (78.3)	26.8 (80.2)	25.8 (78.4)	19.2 (66.6)	10.8 (51.4)	−0.8 (30.6)	−9.2 (15.4)	9.0 (48.2)
Daily mean °C (°F)	−18.1 (−0.6)	−16.9 (1.6)	−8.1 (17.4)	5.2 (41.4)	12.5 (54.5)	18.2 (64.8)	19.7 (67.5)	18.1 (64.6)	11.2 (52.2)	3.3 (37.9)	−6.9 (19.6)	−15.3 (4.5)	1.9 (35.4)
Mean daily minimum °C (°F)	−23.9 (−11.0)	−23.3 (−9.9)	−14.5 (5.9)	−1.7 (28.9)	4.3 (39.7)	10.1 (50.2)	12.0 (53.6)	10.0 (50.0)	3.2 (37.8)	−3.3 (26.1)	−12.1 (10.2)	−20.9 (−5.6)	−5.0 (23.0)
Average precipitation mm (inches)	9.3 (0.37)	7.9 (0.31)	8.3 (0.33)	12.6 (0.50)	17 (0.7)	19.7 (0.78)	29.5 (1.16)	14.8 (0.58)	7.2 (0.28)	8.1 (0.32)	9.1 (0.36)	9.7 (0.38)	153.2 (6.03)
Average precipitation days (≥ 1.0 mm)	3.7	3.0	3.0	3.7	4.4	4.6	5.0	2.9	1.6	2.7	3.3	3.4	41.3
Source: NOAA
