= Kyzylarai =

- Қызыларай
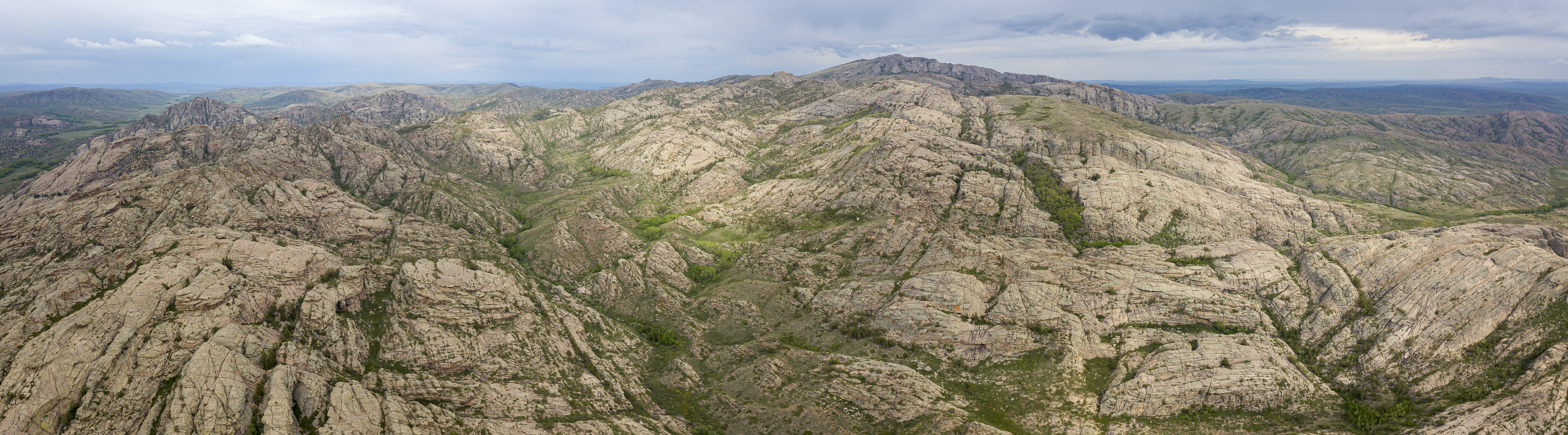
- View of the highest elevations of the massif with clouds over Mt Aksoran

Highest point
- Peak: Aksoran (Ақсораң)
- Elevation: 1,565 m (5,135 ft)
- Coordinates: 48°25′37″N 75°28′47″E

Geography
- Location within Kazakhstan
- Location: Kazakhstan
- Range coordinates: 48°31′N 75°26′E
- Parent range: Kazakh Uplands

Geology
- Orogeny: Alpine orogeny

Climbing
- Easiest route: From Shabanbay Bi

Kyzylarai (Kazakh: Қызыларай) is a massif located in Aktogay District, Karaganda Region, Kazakhstan.

The place is rich in natural and historical sights. Begazy burial grounds (Begazy-Dandybai culture of the Bronze Age) are one of them. The world's largest mountain sheep, the Argali, can be seen in the area.

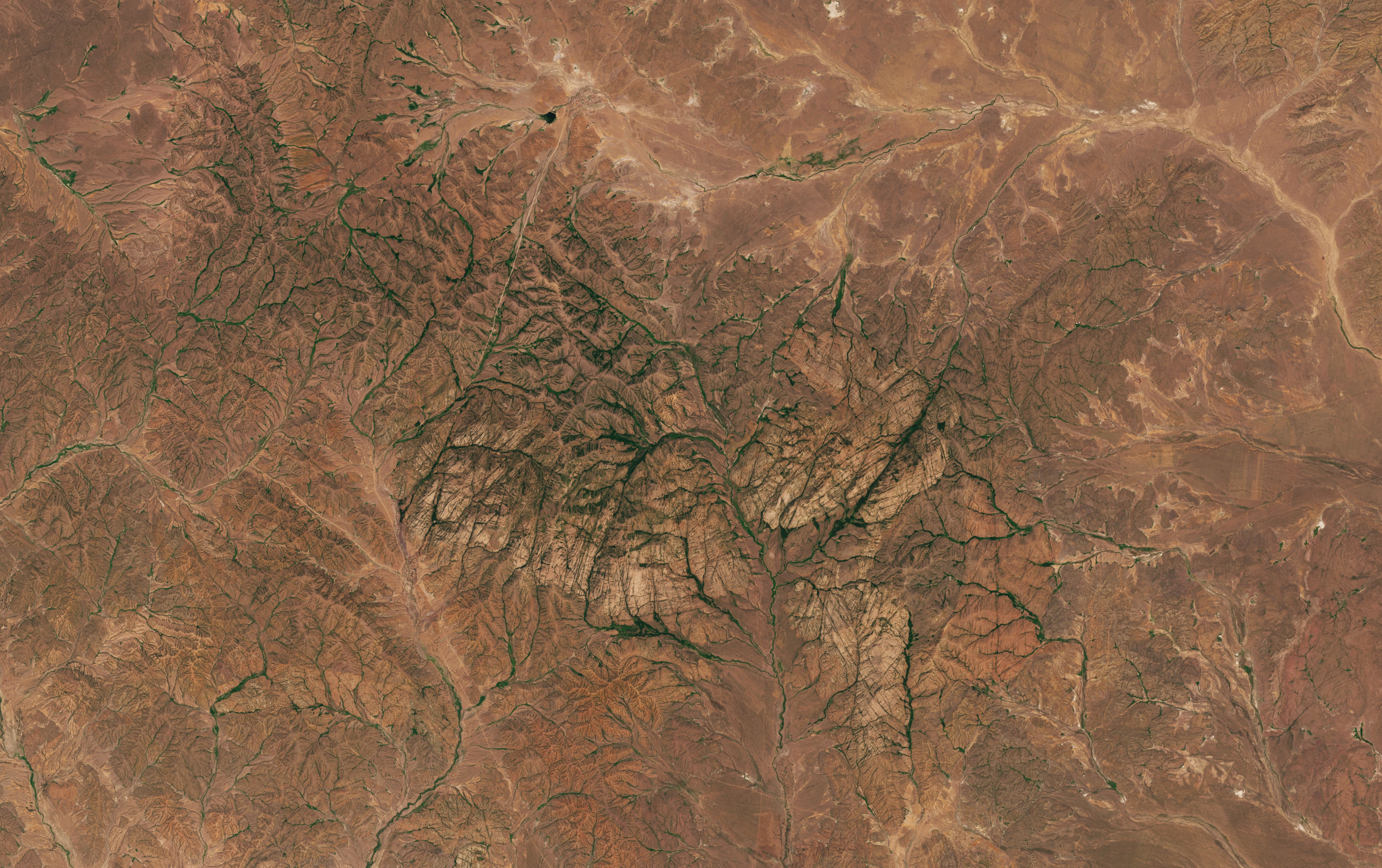
A satellite image of the massif (Sentinel-2 L1C data, modified)

== Geography ==
Kyzylarai is located in the southern part of the Kazakh Uplands, north of Lake Balkhash and south of the Karkaraly Range. The slightly lower Kyzyltas massif rises to the northwest.

The highest point of the Kazakh Uplands and of Central Kazakhstan, Mt Aksoran (1,565 metres (5,135 ft)), is located in the massif.

Birches, pines, Siberian peashrubs and Filipendula grow in the area. On the slopes there are spear grass pastures.

== See also ==
- Geography of Kazakhstan
