= Zhanbay Island =

Zhanbay Island Жанбай аралы Джамбайский
- Island
- Location within Caspian Sea
- Coordinates: 46°17′N 49°48′E
- Country: Kazakhstan
- Region: Atyrau Region

Zhanbay Aral, or Dzhambayskiy Island (Kazakh: Жанбай аралы, Janbai araly), is a low, flat island in the Caspian Sea. It is located east of the mouths of the Volga.

Administratively, Zhanbay Island belongs to Atyrau Region of Kazakhstan.

== Geography ==
Zhanbay Island is separated from the Kazakh coast by a 1.2 km wide channel. It has a length of 21.5 km and a maximum width of 7 km.
