= Aktogay District, Karaganda Region =

Coordinates: 48.3165°N 74.9794°E

Aktogay
- District
- Ақтоғай ауданы
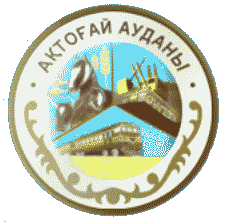
- Coat of arms

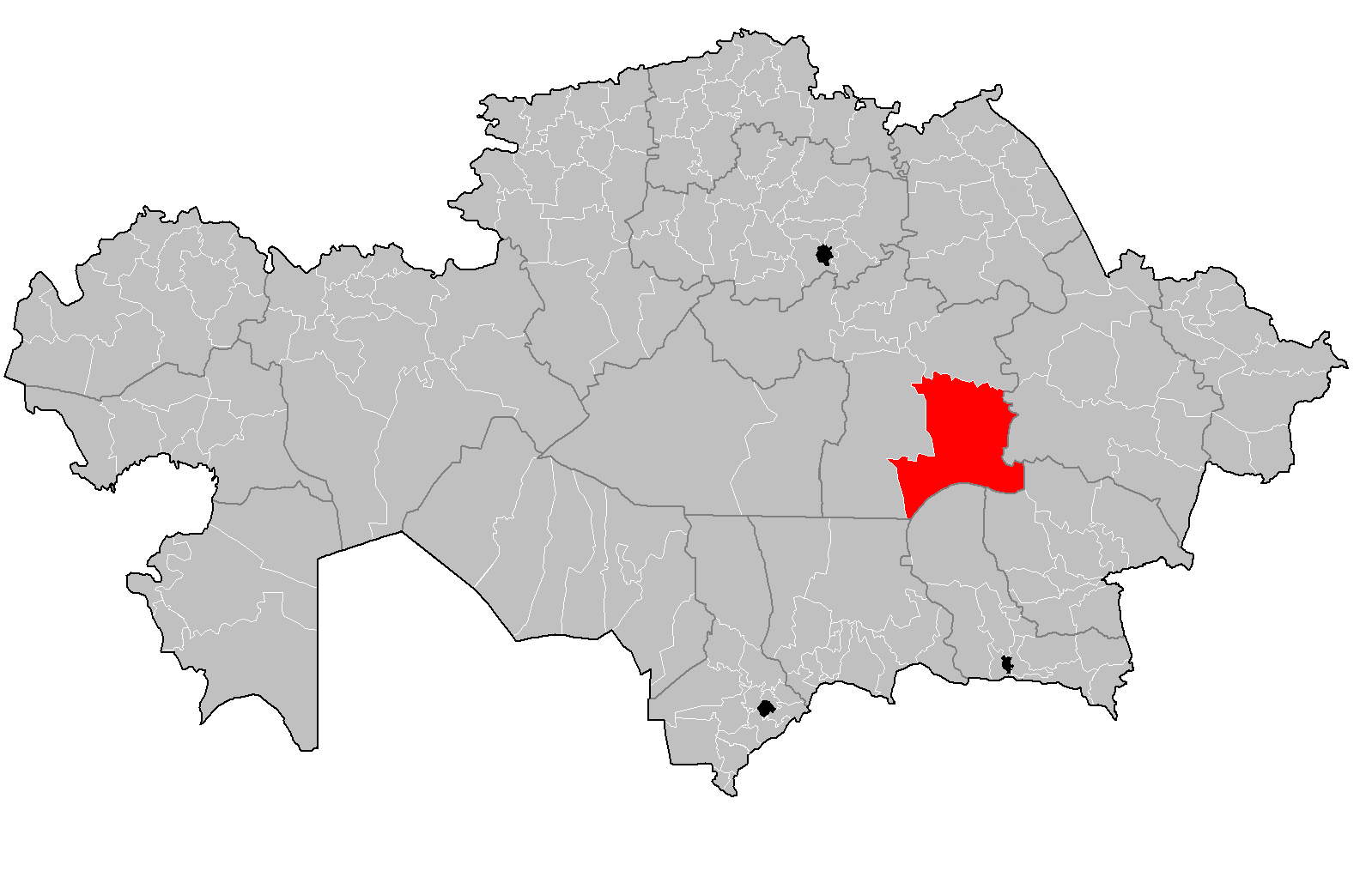
- Country: Kazakhstan
- Region: Karaganda Region
- Administrative center: Aktogay
- Founded: 1928

Government
  - Akim: Ruslan Kenzhebekov

Area
  - Total: 20,000 sq mi (52,000 km^{2})

Population (2019)
  - Total: 17,474
- Time zone: UTC+6 (East)

Aktogay District (Kazakh: Ақтоғай ауданы, Aqtoğai audany) is a district of Karaganda Region in central Kazakhstan. The administrative center of the district is the selo of Aktogay. Population: 18,497 (2013 estimate); 19,233 (2009 census results); 24,051 (1999 census results).As of 2019, the population is 17,474 people.

== Demographics ==
The population is 17,474 people.

National composition (at the beginning of 2019):

- Kazakhs - 15,986 people. (91.48%)
- Russians - 1142 people. (6.54%)
- Germans - 42 people. (0.24%)
- Ukrainians - 29 people. (0.17%)
- Belarusians - 17 people. (0.10%)
- Azerbaijanis - 14 people. (0.08%)
- Tatars - 56 people. (0.32%)
- Koreans - 48 (0.27%) people.
- others - 140 people. (0.80%)
- Total - 17,474 people. (100.00%)

== Geography ==
Aksoran, the highest point of the Kyzylarai massif of the Kazakh Uplands, is located in the district. The larger Kyzyltas range rises to the northwest of it.
