= Karaganda Region =

Region in central Kazakhstan

Karaganda Region Қарағанды облысы (Kazakh) Карагандинская область (Russian)
- Region
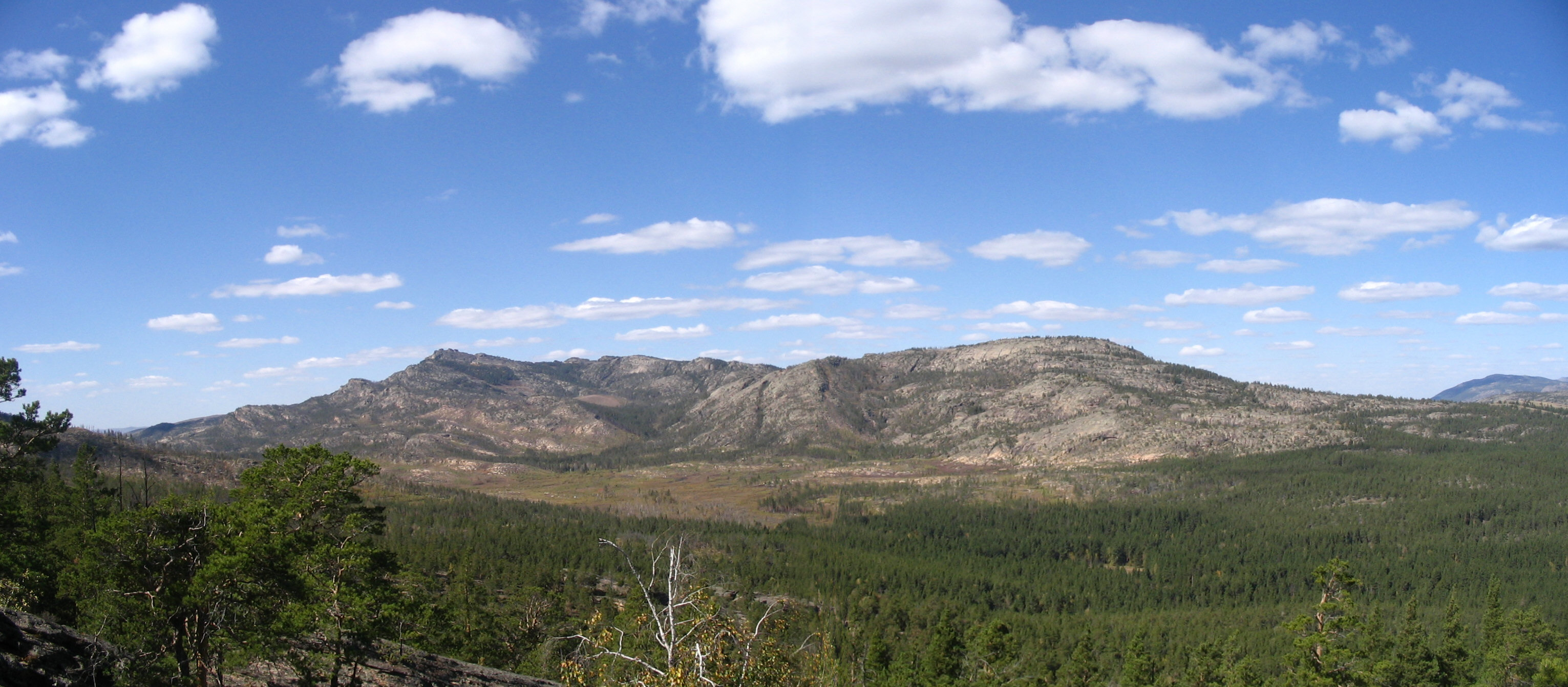
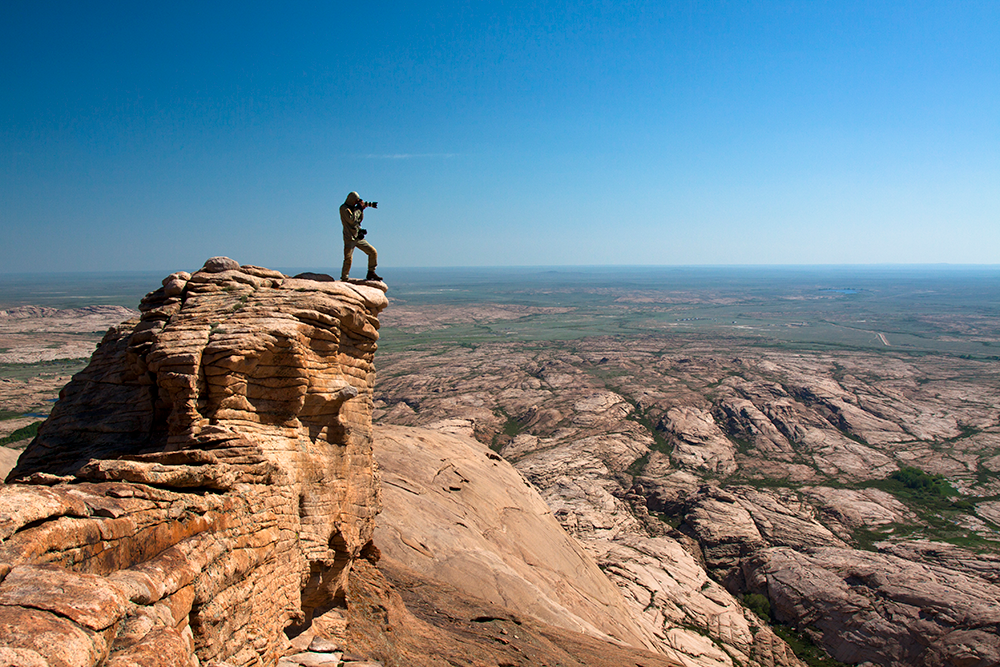
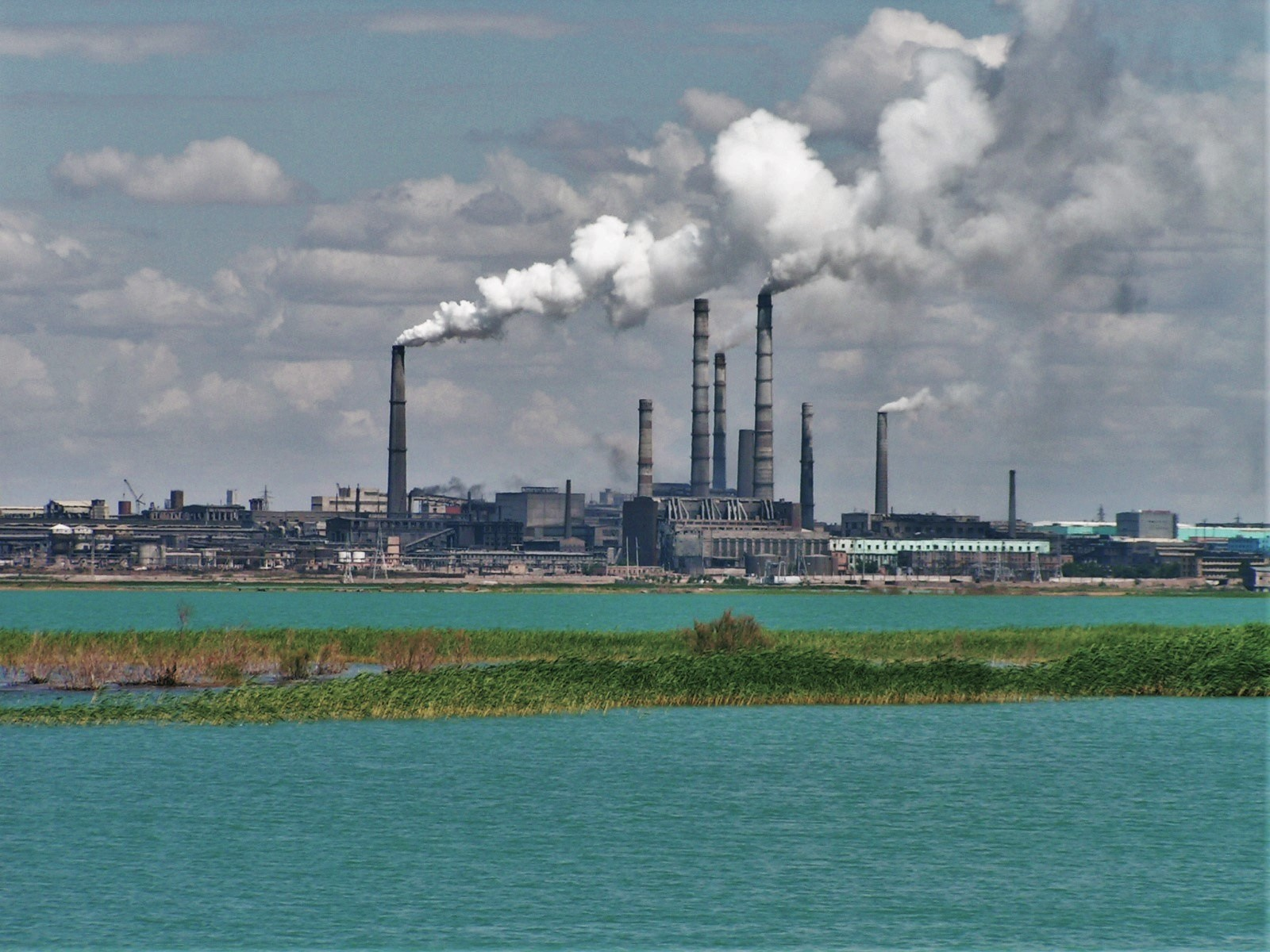
- From the top, Karkaraly National Park, Bektauata, Lake Balkhash

- Flag Coat of arms

- Map of Kazakhstan, location of Karaganda Region highlighted
- Coordinates: 48°0′N 71°0′E
- Country: Kazakhstan
- Capital: Karaganda

Government
  - Akim: Ermağanbet Bölekpaev

Area
  - Total: 239,046 km^{2} (92,296 sq mi)
- Highest elevation: 1,565 m (5,135 ft)
- Lowest elevation: 500 m (1,600 ft)

Population (2022)
  - Total: 1,134,146
  - Density: 4.74447/km^{2} (12.2881/sq mi)

GDP (Nominal, 2024)
  - Total: KZT 9,237 billion (US$ 19.398 billion) · 4th
  - Per capita: KZT 8,141,000 (US$ 17,096)
- Time zone: UTC+05:00
  - Summer (DST): UTC+05:00 (unchanged)
- Postal codes: 100000
- Area codes: +7 (721)
- ISO 3166 code: KZ-KAR
- Vehicle registration: 09, M
- Districts: 9
- Cities: 11
- Townships: 39
- Villages: 557
- HDI (2023): 0.857 very high · 2nd
- Website: karaganda-region.gov.kz/eng/

Karaganda Region (Note: Kazakh: Қарағанды облысы, romanized: Qarağandy oblysy; Russian: Карагандинская область, romanized: Karagandinskaya oblast') is a region of Kazakhstan. Its capital is Karaganda. The region borders Akmola and Pavlodar Region to the north; Abai Region to the east; Jetisu, Almaty, and Zhambyl Regions to the south; and Kostanay and Ulytau regions to the west.

In 2022, the western parts of the region were split off to create the Ulytau Region.

== History ==
The region was the site of intense coal mining during the days of the Soviet Union and also the site of several Gulag forced labor camps. Following World War II, Joseph Stalin, leader of the Soviet Union, had many ethnic Germans deported to the area.

There have been constant border changes within the region's history. The first took place in 1954 when it was ceded parts of Kustanay Oblast and parts of Taldy-Kurgan Oblast. In 1973, Dzhezkazgan Oblast was split off from Karaganda Oblast making it a fraction of the size it once was. In 1986, Karaganda Oblast was given the southern part of Tselinograd Oblast as part of another set of border reforms taking place in the Kazakh S.S.R. When Kazakhstan gained independence in 1991, Karaganda Oblast retained its post-1988 boundaries. The last change the region saw was in 1998 when Jezkazgan (Dzhezkazgan) Oblast was liquidated and re-merged with Karaganda oblast, thus making it the largest region of Kazakhstan in terms of area once again.

On 17 March 2022, Kazakh president Kassym-Jomart Tokayev announced that a part of the region would become a separate region, called Ulytau Region. The bill came into force on 8 June 2022.

=== Archaeological findings ===
In July 2019, remains of a young couple buried face to face dated 4,000 years back were unearthed in Karaganda Region in central Kazakhstan by a group of archaeologists led by Igor Kukushkin from Saryarka Archaeological Institute in Karaganda. It is assumed that the Bronze Age couple were 16 or 17 years old when they died. Kukushkin supposes that they were from a 'noble family' thanks to the buried gold and jewelry artifacts, ceramic pots, women's two bracelets on each arm beads, and remains of horses and knives found in the grave.

== Geography ==
With an area of 428,000 km^{2}, Karaganda Region is Kazakhstan's largest region. It is known for its natural environment and historical sights. Although it doesn't touch the borders of any country, it touches nearly every other region, due to its location in the center of the country. They are Aktobe Region to the west; Kostanay Region to the northwest; Akmola Region to the north; Pavlodar Region to the northeast; East Kazakhstan Region to the east; Almaty Region to the southeast; Jambyl Region and Turkistan Region to the south; and Kyzylorda Region to the southwest.

The area is arid with flat plains between hills and seasonal streams. The Karkaraly and Kent range, featuring the Karkaraly National Park, covering 90,300 hectares, is located in the Kazakh Uplands, as well as Kyzylarai, with the highest point of the region, 1,565 metres (5,135 ft) high mount Aksoran.

The Ishim (Esil) River, a tributary of the Irtysh River, begins in Karaganda Region; the Nura River and Tokrau are the region's other major rivers. The Ishim and Nura are replenished with water from the Irtysh, supplied by the 451 km long Irtysh–Karaganda Canal. Lake Balkhash is located on the Southeast side.

== Demographics ==
Historical population
Year	Pop.	±% p.a.
1979	1,713,208	—
1989	1,745,448	+0.19%
1999	1,410,218	−2.11%
2009	1,341,700	−0.50%
2021	1,375,788	+0.21%
Source: Citypopulation

As of 2020, the Karaganda Region has a population of 1,376,882.

Ethnic groups (2020):

- Kazakh: 52.36%
- Russian: 35.07%
- Ukrainian: 2.84%
- German: 2.28%
- Tatar: 2.21%
- Others: 5.24%

== Administrative divisions ==
The region is administratively divided into districts, as well as the cities of Karaganda, Balkhash, Saran, Shakhtinsk, and Temirtau. The districts are:

1. Abay District, with the administrative center in the town of Abay;
2. Aktogay District, the selo of Aktogay;
3. Bukhar-Zhyrau District, the settlement of Botakara;
4. Karkaraly District, the town of Karkaraly;
5. Nura District, the settlement of Nura;
6. Sarybel District, the settlement of Osakarovka;
7. Shet District, the selo of Aksu-Ayuly;

The following nine localities in Karaganda Region have town status: Karaganda, Balkhash, Priozersk, Saran, Shakhtinsk, and Temirtau.

For some decades during the USSR era, the southern part of what is today Karaganda Region was a separate region, known as Jezkazgan Region, with the administrative center in Jezkazgan.

== Elections ==
Party	Votes	%
Nur Otan	548,864	83.20
Democratic Party of Kazakhstan Ak Zhol	50,599	7.67
Communist People's Party of Kazakhstan	50,071	7.59
Kazakhstani Social Democratic Party Auyl	8,642	1.31
Nationwide Social Democratic Party	1,188	0.18
Birlik	330	0.05
Invalid/blank votes		–
Total		
Registered voters/turnout		
Source: CEC, CEC

== Sister cities ==
- Ulsan, South Korea (2010)
