= Circles of latitude between the 50th parallel north and the 55th parallel north =

Circles of latitude

Following are circles of latitude between the 50th parallel north and the 55th parallel north:

== 51st parallel north ==
51st parallel north (interactive map)

The 51st parallel north is a circle of latitude that is 51 degrees north of the Earth's equatorial plane. It crosses Europe, Asia, the Pacific Ocean, North America, and the Atlantic Ocean.

At this latitude the sun is visible for 16 hours, 33 minutes during the summer solstice and 7 hours, 55 minutes during the winter solstice.

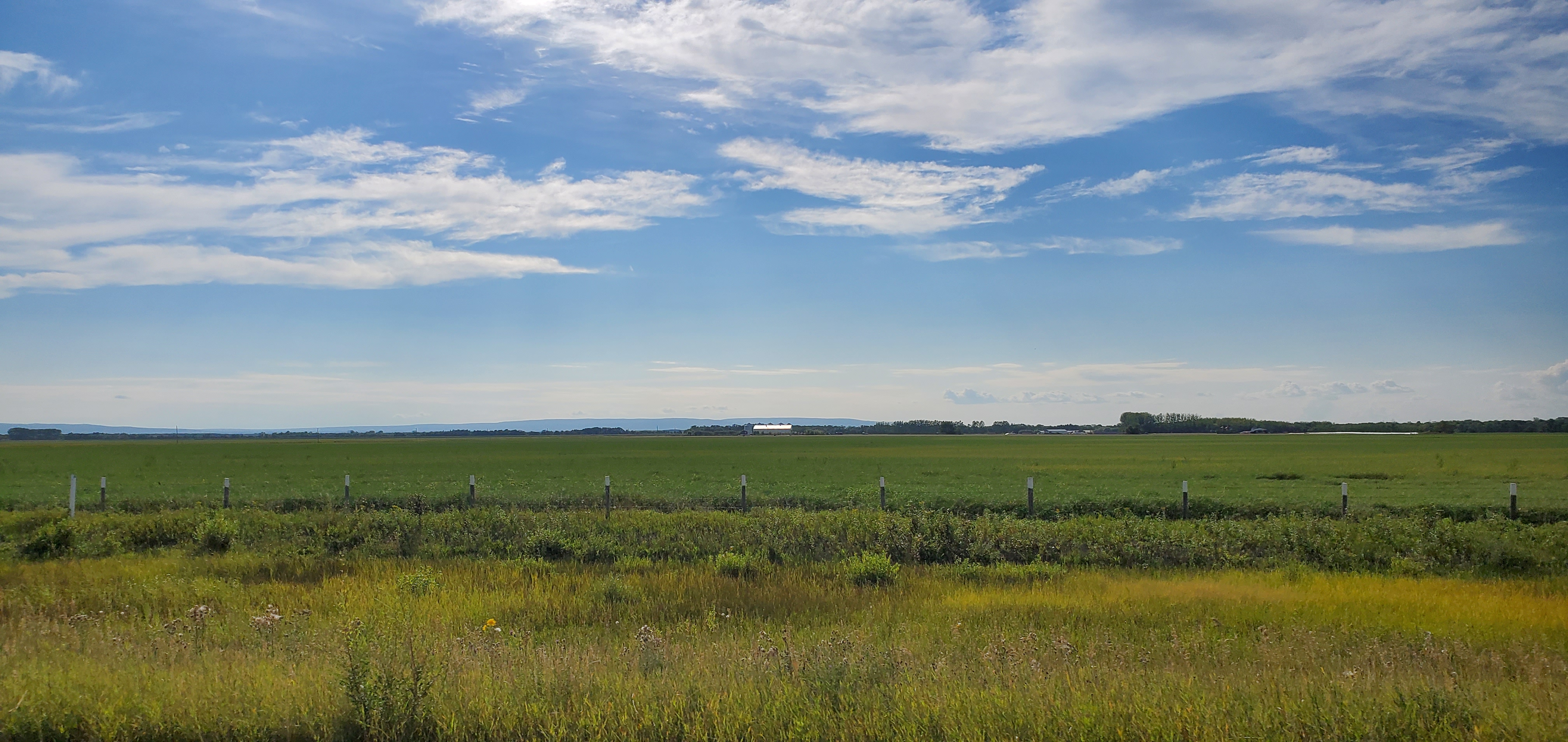
51st parallel north

Capital cities between the 51st and 52nd parallels are London and Astana.

=== Russian America 1799–1824/25 ===
In 1799 Paul I, Tsar of the Russian Empire, issued a ukase creating the Russian-American Company (RAC). It was granted monopolistic control north of the 55th parallel north, which had been the Russian claim since 1790, as well as the right to operate and occupy territory to the south as long as the lands had not been previously occupied, or dependent on any other nation. In 1821 the RAC's charter was renewed and at the same time an ukase proclaimed that Russian sovereignty extended south to the 51st parallel, and that waters north of that line were closed to foreign shipping. The ukase was met with strong objections by the United States and Great Britain. Subsequent negotiations resulted in a clear and permanent boundary for Russian America, the southward terminus of which was established at 54°40′ north.

=== Around the world ===
Starting at the Prime Meridian (just north of the Sheffield Park Garden in East Sussex, England) and heading eastwards, the parallel 51° north passes through:

Coordinates	Country, territory or sea	Notes
51°0′N 0°0′E	United Kingdom	England: East Sussex, Kent (just south of Dover)
51°0′N 1°30′E	Strait of Dover	Crosses the Channel Tunnel
51°0′N 2°0′E	France	Nord-Pas-de-Calais — passing just south of Dunkirk and the northernmost point of France
51°0′N 2°34′E	Belgium	Passing all 5 provinces of Flanders
51°0′N 5°46′E	Netherlands	Limburg — for about 10 km (6.2 mi) — passing through Sittard
51°0′N 5°54′E	Germany	North Rhine-Westphalia — passing through northern Cologne; Hesse; Thuringia — passing through Erfurt; Saxony-Anhalt; Thuringia; Saxony — passing just south of Dresden
51°0′N 14°15′E	Czech Republic	
51°0′N 14°34′E	Germany	Saxony
51°0′N 14°55′E	Poland	For about 4 km (2.5 mi)
51°0′N 14°58′E	Czech Republic	
51°0′N 15°6′E	Poland	For about 3 km (1.9 mi)
51°0′N 15°8′E	Czech Republic	For about 3 km (1.9 mi)
51°0′N 15°10′E	Poland	Passing just south of Wrocław
51°0′N 23°57′E	Ukraine	Volyn oblast — passing just north of Lutsk; Rivne Oblast; Zhytomyr Oblast — passing just north of Korosten; Kyiv Oblast — passing through Kyiv Reservoir; Chernihiv Oblast — passing just south of Nizhyn; Sumy Oblast — passing just north of Sumy
51°0′N 35°20′E	Russia	
51°0′N 49°19′E	Kazakhstan	West Kazakhstan Region — passing just south of Oral, Kazakhstan
51°0′N 54°11′E	Russia	For about 25 km (15.5 mi)
51°0′N 54°33′E	Kazakhstan	For about 14 km (8.7 mi)
51°0′N 54°46′E	Russia	For about 118 km (73 mi)
51°0′N 56°27′E	Kazakhstan	For about 11 km (6.8 mi)
51°0′N 56°36′E	Russia	For about 9 km (5.5 mi)
51°0′N 56°44′E	Kazakhstan	For about 39 km (24 mi)
51°0′N 57°18′E	Russia	For about 32 km (19.8 mi)
51°0′N 57°45′E	Kazakhstan	For about 61 km (37 mi)
51°0′N 58°37′E	Russia	For about 199 km (123 mi)
51°0′N 61°30′E	Kazakhstan	Kostanay Region Akmola Region — passing just south of Derzhavinsk Passing just south of Astana Karaganda Region East Kazakhstan Region
51°0′N 79°53′E	Russia	For about 42 km (26 mi)
51°0′N 80°29′E	Kazakhstan	For about 42 km (26 mi)
51°0′N 81°04′E	Russia	For about 143 km (89 mi)
51°0′N 83°06′E	Kazakhstan	For about 5 km (3.1 mi)
51°0′N 83°11′E	Russia	For about 2 km (1.2 mi)
51°0′N 83°12′E	Kazakhstan	For about 15 km (9.3 mi)
51°0′N 97°50′E	Mongolia	Passing Lake Khövsgöl
51°0′N 102°15′E	Russia	
51°0′N 119°37′E	China	Inner Mongolia; Heilongjiang
51°0′N 127°0′E	Russia	
51°0′N 140°38′E	Strait of Tartary	
51°0′N 142°14′E	Russia	Island of Sakhalin
51°0′N 143°36′E	Sea of Okhotsk	
51°0′N 156°46′E	Russia	Kamchatka Peninsula
51°0′N 156°51′E	Pacific Ocean	Passing just south of Amatignak Island, Alaska, United States; Passing just north of Vancouver Island, British Columbia, Canada
51°0′N 127°31′W	Canada	British Columbia — passing through city of Revelstoke; Alberta — passing through city of Calgary; Saskatchewan; Manitoba - passing just south of the city of Dauphin; Ontario - passing just south of the town of Red Lake; Passing just south of the tip of James Bay (51°10′N 79°50′W); Quebec
51°0′N 58°48′W	Gulf of Saint Lawrence	
51°0′N 57°3′W	Canada	Newfoundland and Labrador — island of Newfoundland
51°0′N 55°50′W	Atlantic Ocean	Passing just north of Groais Island, Newfoundland and Labrador, Canada
51°0′N 4°32′W	United Kingdom	England — Devon, Dorset, Wiltshire, Hampshire (passing just north of Southampton), West Sussex, East Sussex

=== Notable cities and towns on 51°N ===
- Astana, Kazakhstan
- Wrocław, Poland
- London, England, UK
- Calgary, Alberta, Canada

== 52nd parallel north ==
52nd parallel north (interactive map)

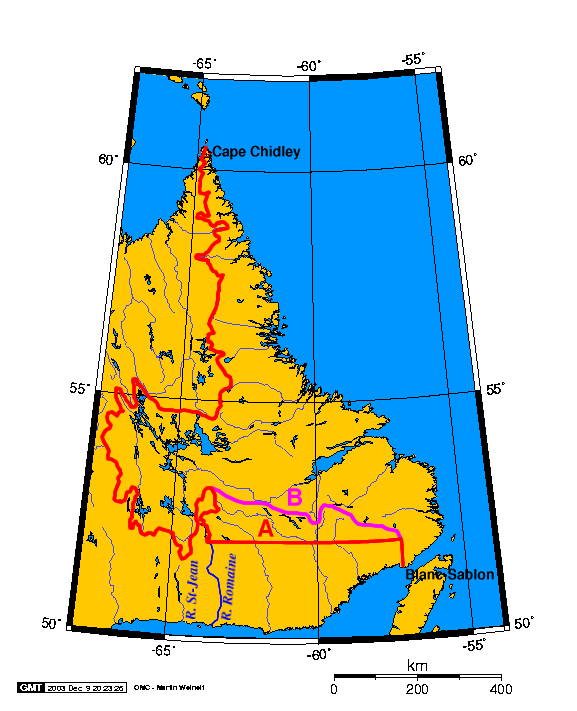
In Canada, the 52nd parallel north defines part of the border between Quebec and Newfoundland and Labrador (line A), though Quebec maintains a dormant claim to some of the territory to the north of the parallel (line B).

The 52nd parallel north is a circle of latitude that is 52 degrees north of the Earth's equatorial plane. It crosses Europe, Asia, the Pacific Ocean, North America, and the Atlantic Ocean.

In Canada, part of the legally defined border between Quebec and Newfoundland and Labrador is defined by the parallel, though Quebec maintains a dormant claim to some of the territory north of this line.

The catchment area of London, the capital city of England and the United Kingdom, can be broadly defined by the 51st and 52nd parallels.

At this latitude the sun is visible for 16 hours, 44 minutes during the summer solstice and 7 hours, 45 minutes during the winter solstice.

=== Around the world ===
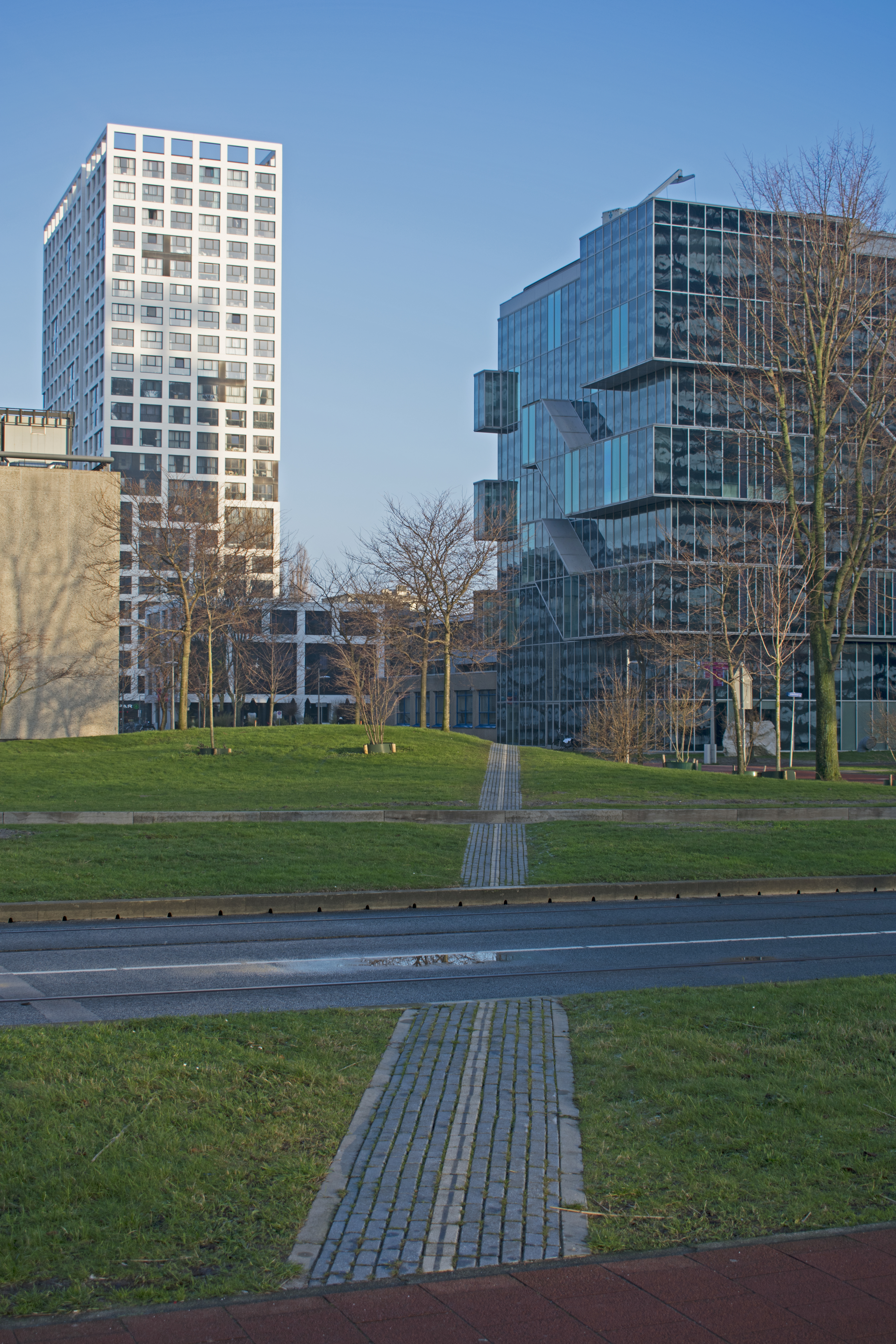
The 52nd parallel north shown on the ground, Delft University of Technology, the Netherlands

Starting at the Prime Meridian (just west of the village of Barkway in Hertfordshire, England) and heading eastwards, the parallel 52° north passes through:

Coordinates	Country, territory or sea	Notes
52°0′N 0°0′E	United Kingdom	England - passing just south of Ipswich
52°0′N 1°25′E	North Sea	
52°0′N 4°8′E	Netherlands	Provinces of South Holland, Utrecht and Gelderland, including directly through the cities of Delft, Gouda, Nieuwegein, and Arnhem.
52°0′N 6°48′E	Germany	States of North Rhine-Westphalia, Lower Saxony, Saxony-Anhalt and Brandenburg
52°0′N 14°43′E	Poland	passing just north of Zielona Góra, and through Biała Podlaska Airport
52°0′N 23°42′E	Belarus	
52°0′N 30°54′E	Ukraine	Chernihiv Oblast; Sumy Oblast — passing just north of Shostka
52°0′N 34°6′E	Russia	
52°0′N 60°9′E	Kazakhstan	
52°0′N 79°7′E	Russia	
52°0′N 98°49′E	Mongolia	
52°0′N 99°17′E	Russia	Passing through Lake Baikal
52°0′N 120°42′E	China	Inner Mongolia; Heilongjiang
52°0′N 126°27′E	Russia	
52°0′N 141°20′E	Strait of Tartary	
52°0′N 141°40′E	Russia	Island of Sakhalin
52°0′N 143°10′E	Sea of Okhotsk	
52°0′N 156°29′E	Russia	Kamchatka Peninsula
52°0′N 158°17′E	Pacific Ocean	
52°0′N 177°30′E	United States	Alaska - Kiska Island
52°0′N 177°33′E	Bering Sea	
52°0′N 178°6′E	United States	Alaska - Segula Island
52°0′N 178°11′E	Bering Sea	Passing just north of Khvostof Island, Davidof Island and Little Sitkin Island, Alaska, United States
52°0′N 179°34′E	United States	Alaska - Semisopochnoi Island
52°0′N 179°43′E	Bering Sea	Passing just north of Tanaga Island and Kanaga Island, Alaska, United States
52°0′N 176°35′W	United States	Alaska - Adak Island
52°0′N 176°33′W	Bering Sea	
52°0′N 176°9′W	United States	Alaska - Great Sitkin Island
52°0′N 176°3′W	Bering Sea	Passing just north of Igitkin Island, Tagalak Island and Oglodak Island, Alaska, United States
52°0′N 175°22′W	Pacific Ocean	Passing just south of Atka Island and Amlia Island, Alaska, United States
52°0′N 131°6′W	Canada	British Columbia - Kunghit Island
52°0′N 131°2′W	Pacific Ocean	Queen Charlotte Sound
52°0′N 128°13′W	Canada	British Columbia - Hunter Island, King Island and the mainland Alberta; Saskatchewan; Manitoba - including Lake Winnipegosis and Lake Winnipeg; Ontario
52°0′N 80°59′W	James Bay	
52°0′N 79°39′W	Canada	Nunavut - Charlton Island and Carey Island
52°0′N 79°12′W	James Bay	
52°0′N 78°42′W	Canada	Quebec; Newfoundland and Labrador; Quebec; Quebec / Newfoundland and Labrador border (disputed by Quebec); Newfoundland and Labrador
52°0′N 55°52′W	Atlantic Ocean	Strait of Belle Isle
52°0′N 55°18′W	Canada	Newfoundland and Labrador - Belle Isle
52°0′N 55°16′W	Atlantic Ocean	
52°0′N 10°13′W	Ireland	Passing directly through the country's highest point Carrauntoohil, County Kerry, County Cork, County Waterford
52°0′N 7°35′W	St George's Channel	
52°0′N 5°5′W	United Kingdom	Wales; England - passing between Bletchley and Milton Keynes at 0° 44′ W

== 53rd parallel north ==
53rd parallel north (interactive map)

The 53rd parallel north is a circle of latitude that is 53 degrees north of the Earth's equatorial plane. It crosses Europe, Asia, the Pacific Ocean, North America, and the Atlantic Ocean.

At this latitude the sun is visible for 16 hours, 56 minutes during the summer solstice and 7 hours, 34 minutes during the winter solstice. Approximately 53°20′ North, 37 km (23 mi) north of this parallel, during the June summer solstice, the sun is visible for 17 hours exactly. If the latitude in the northern hemisphere is 53°47′ or smaller, it is possible to view both astronomical dawn and dusk every day of the month of August.

One minute of longitude along the 53rd parallel is approximately 0.6042 nautical miles (1,224 yd; 1.119 km). One degree of longitude along the 53rd parallel is about 36.252 nautical miles (41.72 mi; 67.14 km).

=== Around the world ===
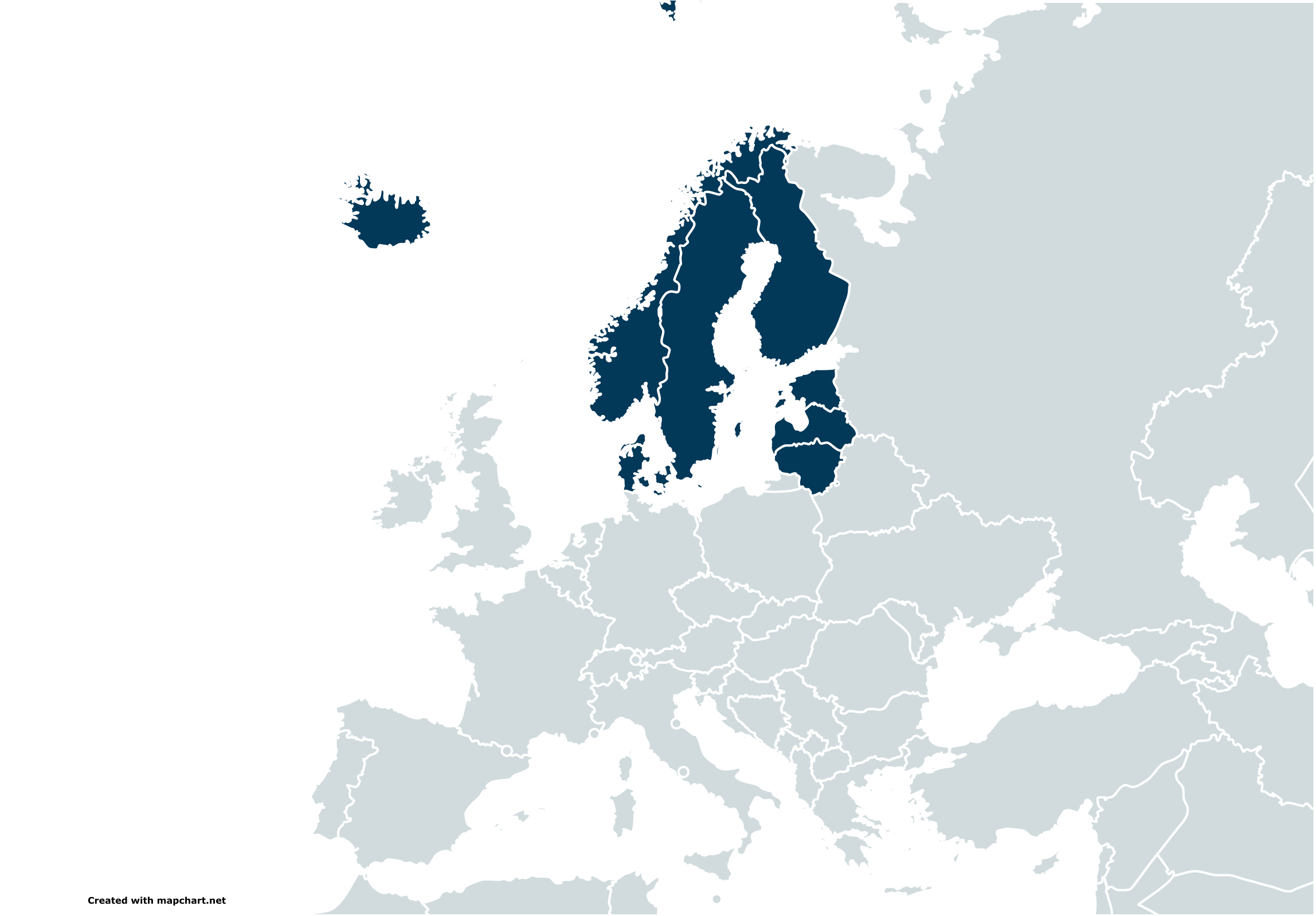
European countries entirely north of 53° N

Starting at the Prime Meridian (northeast of Boston, Lincolnshire, England) and heading eastwards, the parallel 53° north passes through:

Coordinates	Country, territory or sea	Notes
53°0′N 0°0′E	United Kingdom	England
53°0′N 0°8′E	North Sea	
53°0′N 4°43′E	Netherlands	Island of Texel (Province of North Holland)
53°0′N 4°47′E	Wadden Sea	
53°0′N 5°24′E	Netherlands	Provinces of Friesland, Drenthe and Groningen
53°0′N 7°13′E	Germany	Lower Saxony, Saxony-Anhalt (for about 10 km (6.2 mi)), Brandenburg
53°0′N 14°15′E	Poland	West Pomeranian Voivodeship
53°0′N 23°56′E	Belarus	Grodno Region
53°0′N 31°19′E	Russia	Bryansk Oblast
53°0′N 61°9′E	Kazakhstan	For about 10 km (6.2 mi)
53°0′N 61°18′E	Russia	For about 7 km (4.3 mi)
53°0′N 61°24′E	Kazakhstan	For about 12 km (7.5 mi)
53°0′N 61°35′E	Russia	For about 18 km (11 mi)
53°0′N 61°51′E	Kazakhstan	For about 4 km (2.5 mi)
53°0′N 61°54′E	Russia	For about 15 km (9.3 mi)
53°0′N 62°7′E	Kazakhstan	Kostanay Region
53°0′N 78°12′E	Russia	Passing through Lake Baikal
53°0′N 120°26′E	China	Inner Mongolia; Heilongjiang
53°0′N 125°41′E	Russia	Amur Oblast
53°0′N 141°11′E	Strait of Tartary	
53°0′N 141°54′E	Russia	Island of Sakhalin
53°0′N 143°17′E	Sea of Okhotsk	
53°0′N 156°7′E	Russia	Kamchatka Peninsula
53°0′N 158°53′E	Pacific Ocean	
53°0′N 172°45′E	United States	Alaska – Attu Island
53°0′N 172°48′E	Bering Sea	
53°0′N 169°45′W	United States	Alaska – Kagamil Island
53°0′N 169°40′W	Bering Sea	
53°0′N 168°55′W	United States	Alaska - Umnak Island, Alaska
53°0′N 168°37′W	Pacific Ocean	Gulf of Alaska
53°0′N 132°23′W	Canada	British Columbia – Hibben Island, Moresby Island and Louise Island
53°0′N 131°41′W	Hecate Strait	
53°0′N 129°41′W	Canada	British Columbia – Estevan Group, Campania Island, Princess Royal Island and the mainland; Alberta – passing south of Edmonton and through the city of Camrose; Saskatchewan; Manitoba – passing through Lake Winnipegosis and Lake Winnipeg; Ontario; Nunavut – Akimiski Island
53°0′N 80°50′W	James Bay	
53°0′N 78°58′W	Canada	Quebec; Newfoundland and Labrador; Quebec – for about 10 km (6.2 mi); Newfoundland and Labrador
53°0′N 55°46′W	Atlantic Ocean	
53°0′N 9°25′W	Ireland	County Clare; County Galway; Lough Derg; County Tipperary; County Offaly; County Laois; County Kildare (including Athy at 53°00′00″N 6°59′17″W); County Wicklow
53°0′N 6°3′W	Irish Sea	
53°0′N 4°26′W	United Kingdom	Wales – passing through Snowdonia 8km South of the peak of Mount Snowdon; England – passing through Stoke-on-Trent and Nottingham

== 54th parallel north ==
54th parallel north (interactive map)

The 54th parallel north is a circle of latitude that is 54 degrees north of the Earth's equatorial plane. It crosses Europe, Asia, the Pacific Ocean, North America, and the Atlantic Ocean.

At this latitude, the sun is visible for 17 hours, 9 minutes during the summer solstice and 7 hours, 22 minutes during the winter solstice.

=== Around the world ===
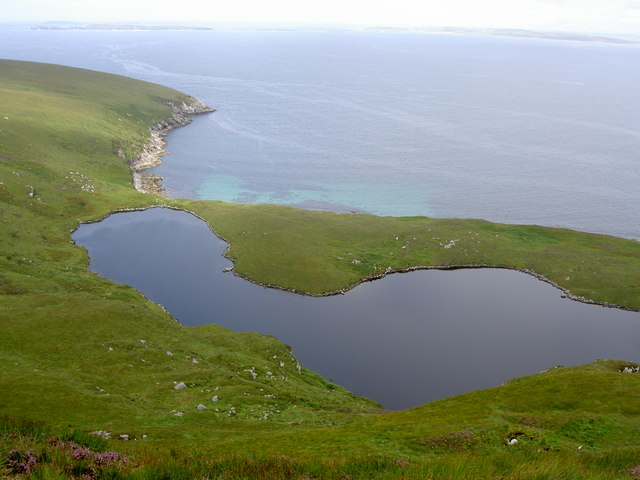
The 54th parallel passes through Lough Nakeeroge on Achill Island

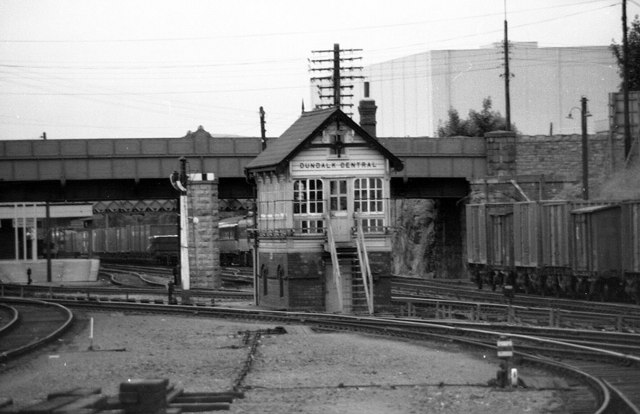
R178 road on the bridge of behind Dundalk South signal cabin almost follows the 54th parallel.

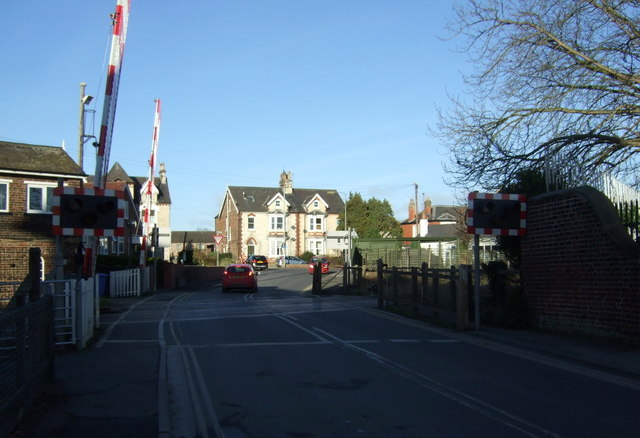
Level crossing in Driffield, East Riding of Yorkshire

Starting at the Prime Meridian (in the North Sea southeast of Bridlington, East Riding of Yorkshire, England) and heading eastwards, the parallel 54° north passes through:

Coordinates	Country, territory or sea	Notes
54°0′N 0°0′E	North Sea	
54°0′N 8°52′E	Germany	State of Schleswig-Holstein
54°0′N 10°47′E	Baltic Sea	Bay of Lübeck
54°0′N 11°1′E	Germany	State of Mecklenburg-Vorpommern
54°0′N 11°12′E	Baltic Sea	Bay of Wismar
54°0′N 11°23′E	Germany	Island of Poel, mainland, and island of Usedom
54°0′N 14°6′E	Baltic Sea	
54°0′N 14°38′E	Poland	Island of Wolin, and mainland
54°0′N 23°29′E	Lithuania	Alytus County
54°0′N 24°36′E	Belarus	For about 7 km (4.3 mi)
54°0′N 24°43′E	Lithuania	For about 8 km (5.0 mi)
54°0′N 24°50′E	Belarus	Passing just north of Minsk
54°0′N 31°52′E	Russia	Smolensk Oblast
54°0′N 61°15′E	Kazakhstan	Kostanay Region
54°0′N 61°34′E	Russia	For about 5 km (3.1 mi)
54°0′N 61°39′E	Kazakhstan	For about 7 km (4.3 mi)
54°0′N 61°46′E	Russia	For about 4 km (2.5 mi)
54°0′N 61°49′E	Kazakhstan	For about 6 km (3.7 mi)
54°0′N 61°54′E	Russia	For about 8 km (5.0 mi)
54°0′N 62°1′E	Kazakhstan	
54°0′N 62°25′E	Russia	For about 14 km (8.7 mi)
54°0′N 62°38′E	Kazakhstan	
54°0′N 72°24′E	Russia	For about 19 km (12 mi)
54°0′N 72°42′E	Kazakhstan	
54°0′N 73°4′E	Russia	
54°0′N 73°31′E	Kazakhstan	For about 15 km (9.3 mi)
54°0′N 73°44′E	Russia	
54°0′N 75°29′E	Kazakhstan	
54°0′N 76°32′E	Russia	Passing through Lake Baikal
54°0′N 137°30′E	Sea of Okhotsk	
54°0′N 138°46′E	Russia	
54°0′N 140°12′E	Sea of Okhotsk	Sakhalin Gulf
54°0′N 142°36′E	Russia	Island of Sakhalin
54°0′N 142°55′E	Sea of Okhotsk	
54°0′N 155°53′E	Russia	Kamchatka Peninsula
54°0′N 159°56′E	Pacific Ocean	
54°0′N 169°30′E	Bering Sea	
54°0′N 166°47′W	United States	Alaska - Unalaska Island
54°0′N 166°21′W	Pacific Ocean	Gulf of Alaska - passing just north of Unalga Island, and just south of Akutan Island, Rootok Island, Avatanak Island and Tigalda Island, Alaska, United States
54°0′N 133°6′W	Canada	British Columbia - Graham Island
54°0′N 131°41′W	Hecate Strait	
54°0′N 130°40′W	Canada	British Columbia - Porcher Island, Kennedy Island Conservancy and the mainland - passing through the port of Kitimat and 7 km (4.3 mi) north of Prince George; Alberta; Saskatchewan; Manitoba - passing just North of The Pas and Norway House; Ontario
54°0′N 82°14′W	James Bay	
54°0′N 78°58′W	Canada	Quebec; Newfoundland and Labrador
54°0′N 57°16′W	Atlantic Ocean	
54°0′N 10°12′W	Ireland	Achill Island; Irish mainland: County Mayo; Lough Conn; County Mayo; County Sligo; County Roscommon; Lough Key; County Roscommon; County Leitrim; County Cavan (including Cavan Town at 54°00′00″N 7°21′32″W); County Monaghan; County Louth (including Dundalk at 54°00′00″N 6°24′23″W)
54°0′N 6°20′W	Dundalk Bay	For about 4.4 km (2.7 mi)
54°0′N 6°16′W	Ireland	Cooley Peninsula (12 km (7.5 mi))
54°0′N 6°7′W	Irish Sea	Passing just south of the Isle of Man
54°0′N 2°54′W	United Kingdom	England inc. Harrogate at 54°0′N 1°30′W
54°0′N 0°13′W	North Sea	

== 55th parallel north ==
55th parallel north (interactive map)

The 55th parallel north is a circle of latitude that is 55 degrees north of the Earth's equatorial plane. It crosses Europe, Asia, the Pacific Ocean, North America, and the Atlantic Ocean.

At this latitude the sun is visible for 17 hours, 22 minutes during the summer solstice and 7 hours, 10 minutes during the winter solstice.

This latitude also roughly corresponds to the minimum latitude in which nautical twilight can last all night near the summer solstice.

The 55th parallel serves as the southern boundary of Nunavik territory in Quebec.

A large luxury apartment complex in Newcastle upon Tyne was named "55 Degrees North" due to the location of the city on the 55th parallel. A BBC TV series called "55 Degrees North" is a fictional police drama set in the same city.

=== Around the world ===
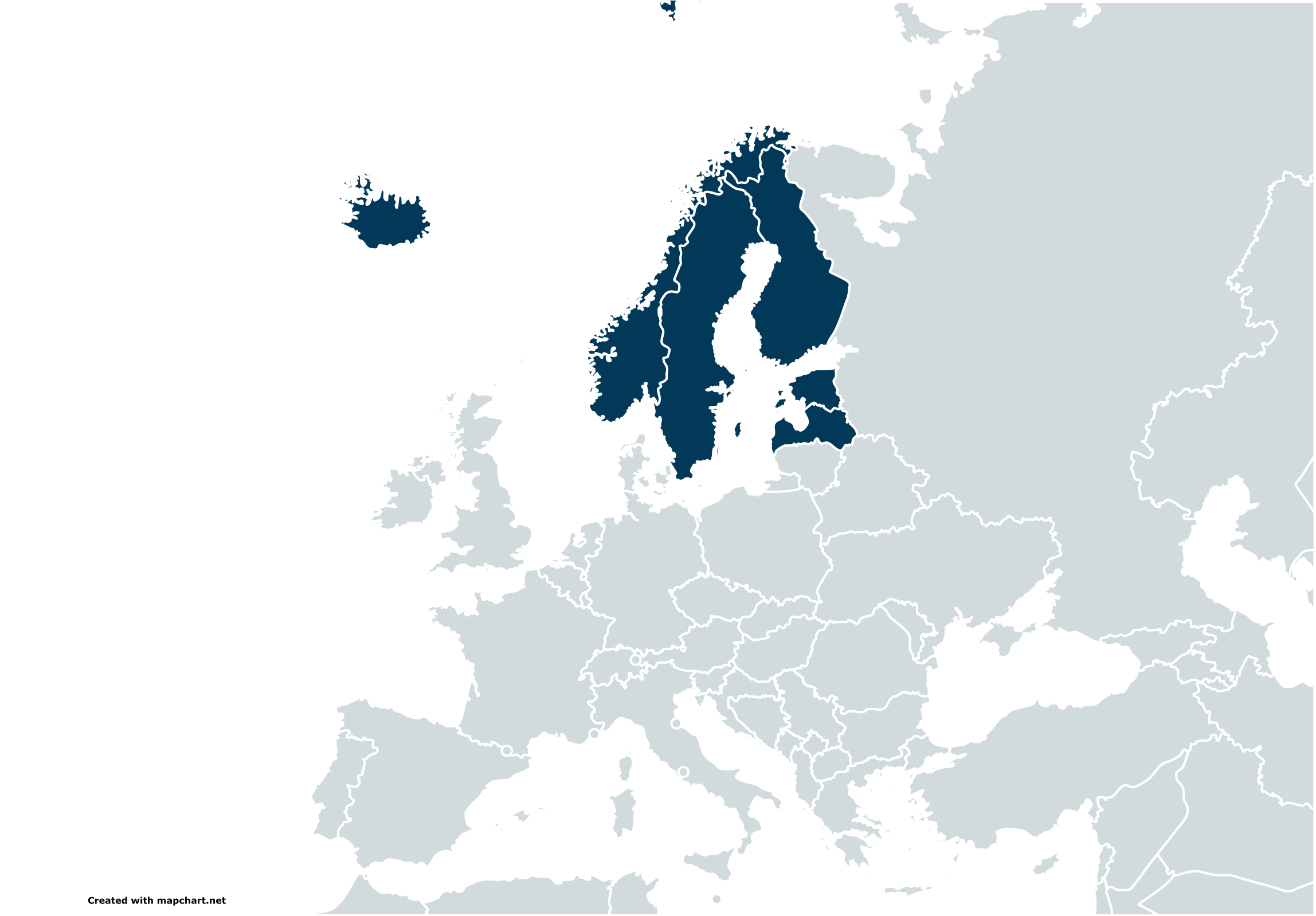
European countries entirely north of 55° N

Starting at the Prime Meridian and heading eastwards, the parallel 55° north passes through:

Coordinates	Country, territory or sea	Notes
55°0′N 0°0′E	North Sea	
55°0′N 8°21′E	Germany	Island of Sylt, close to Germany's northernmost point
55°0′N 8°23′E	Wadden Sea	
55°0′N 8°39′E	Denmark	Jutland (mainland) and the island of Als
55°0′N 9°58′E	Little Belt	
55°0′N 10°27′E	Denmark	Islands of Skarø, Tåsinge and Langeland
55°0′N 10°54′E	Great Belt	
55°0′N 11°5′E	Smålandsfarvandet	
55°0′N 11°53′E	Denmark	Islands of Sjælland and Møn
55°0′N 12°32′E	Baltic Sea	
55°0′N 14°59′E	Denmark	Island of Bornholm. There is a small memorial at 55°N 15°E
55°0′N 15°6′E	Baltic Sea	
55°0′N 20°33′E	Russia	Kaliningrad Oblast – passing through the Curonian Lagoon
55°0′N 22°38′E	Lithuania	Marijampolė County
55°0′N 26°13′E	Belarus	Vitebsk Region
55°0′N 30°58′E	Russia	Smolensk Oblast, Passing just north of Buinsk, Tatarstan,
55°0′N 68°12′E	Kazakhstan	North Kazakhstan Region
55°0′N 71°1′E	Russia	Passing just north of Omsk at 54°59′N 73°22′E; Passing just south of Novosibirsk at 55°3′N 82°57′E
55°0′N 135°24′E	Sea of Okhotsk	
55°0′N 136°47′E	Russia	Feklistova Island
55°0′N 137°4′E	Sea of Okhotsk	
55°0′N 137°26′E	Russia	Bolshoy Shantar Island
55°0′N 138°11′E	Sea of Okhotsk	
55°0′N 155°35′E	Russia	Kamchatka Peninsula
55°0′N 161°59′E	Pacific Ocean	
55°0′N 166°8′E	Russia	Bering Island
55°0′N 166°23′E	Bering Sea	Passing just north of Medny Island, Russia
55°0′N 163°57′W	United States	Alaska – Unimak Island and the Alaska Peninsula
55°0′N 162°34′W	Pacific Ocean	Gulf of Alaska – passing just south of Dolgoi Island and Unga Island, Alaska, United States
55°0′N 160°8′W	United States	Alaska – Nagai Island
55°0′N 160°4′W	Pacific Ocean	Gulf of Alaska
55°0′N 159°25′W	United States	Alaska – Little Koniuji Island
55°0′N 159°21′W	Pacific Ocean	Gulf of Alaska
55°0′N 133°9′W	United States	Alaska – Dall Island, Sukkwan Island and Prince of Wales Island
55°0′N 131°59′W	Clarence Strait	
55°0′N 131°36′W	United States	Alaska – Annette Island and Duke Island
55°0′N 131°15′W	Revillagigedo Channel	
55°0′N 131°0′W	United States	Alaska – Alaska Panhandle
55°0′N 130°15′W	Canada	British Columbia – Pearse Island and the mainland Alberta; Saskatchewan; Manitoba; Ontario
55°0′N 82°16′W	Hudson Bay	
55°0′N 78°28′W	Canada	Quebec; Newfoundland and Labrador – for about 12 km Quebec; Newfoundland and Labrador – for about 5 km Quebec – for about 3 km Newfoundland and Labrador; Quebec; Newfoundland and Labrador – mainland and the Adlavik Islands
55°0′N 58°40′W	Atlantic Ocean	
55°0′N 8°33′W	Ireland	Island of Arranmore and mainland
55°0′N 7°24′W	United Kingdom	Northern Ireland (passing through the city of Derry)
55°0′N 5°59′W	North Channel	
55°0′N 5°10′W	United Kingdom	Scotland (passing through Gretna); England (passing through the Newcastle upon Tyne urban area)
55°0′N 1°25′W	North Sea	

=== Notable cities and towns on 55°N ===
- Chelyabinsk, Chelyabinsk Oblast, Russia
- Omsk, Omsk Oblast, Russia
- Novosibirsk, Novosibirsk Oblast, Russia
- Khimki, Moscow Oblast, Russia
- Moscow, Russia
- Copenhagen, Denmark
- Odense, Denmark
- Klaipėda, Lithuania
- Šiauliai, Lithuania
- Panevėžys, Lithuania
- Daugavpils, Latvia
- Vitebsk, Belarus
- Derry, Northern Ireland, UK
- Newcastle upon Tyne, England, UK
- South Shields, England, UK.
- Thompson, Manitoba, Canada
- Grande Prairie, Alberta, Canada

== See also ==
- Circles of latitude between the 45th parallel north and the 50th parallel north
- Circles of latitude between the 55th parallel north and the 60th parallel north
- Parallel 54°40′ north
