= Koktobe =

Koktobe (Kazakh: Коктобе) refers to several inhabited localities in Kazakhstan.

Rural localities

- Koktobe, Almaty Province, a selo in Eskeldi District of Almaty Province
- Koktobe, Pavlodar Province, a selo and the administrative center of May District in Pavlodar Province
