= Cape Harrisson =

Cape Harrisson (66°43′S 99°3′E) is a point just northward of the Possession Rocks at the junction of Northcliffe Glacier and Denman Glacier. It was discovered by the Australasian Antarctic Expedition (1911–1914) under Sir Douglas Mawson, who named the feature for Charles T. Harrisson, biologist and artist at the expedition's Western Base. The spelling Harrisson (not Harrison) is approved in this toponym, and also in Harrisson Ice Rises, on the basis of the honoree's signature on several of his paintings included in Mawson's The Home of the Blizzard.
