= Tundik =

River in Kazakhstan

Tundik Түндік
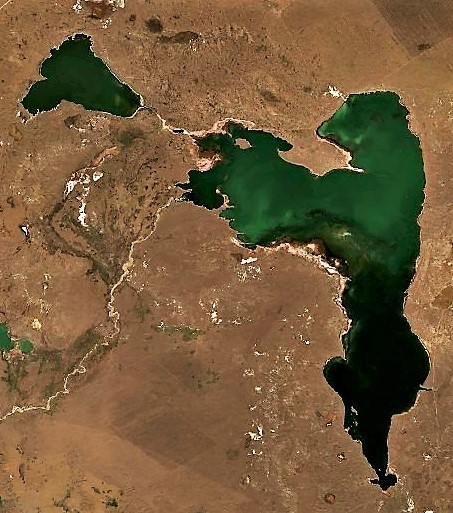
- Sentinel-2 image of the final stretch of river Tundik (on the left) and its mouth in the western lakeshore of Karasor

- Mouth location in Kazakhstan

Location
- Countries: Kazakhstan

Physical characteristics
- Source: Keshubai; Kazakh Uplands
  - coordinates: 49°05′58″N 76°17′46″E
- Mouth: Karasor
  - coordinates: 51°04′45″N 77°25′56″E
- Length: 305 km (190 mi)
- Basin size: 10,100 km^{2} (3,900 sq mi)
- Discharge
  - average: 0.4 cubic metres per second (14 cu ft/s) at Aktastyk

The Tundik (Kazakh: Түндік; Russian: Тундик) is a river in the Karkaraly District, Karaganda Region, and Bayanaul and May districts, Pavlodar Region, Kazakhstan. It is 305 kilometres (190 mi) long and has a catchment area of 10,100 square kilometres (3,900 sq mi).

The river is fed mainly by snow and underground water. It is frozen between November and April. The Tundik waters are used to irrigate the agricultural fields and pastures of the settlements near its banks.

== Course ==
The Tundik has its sources near Akkora, on the slopes of the Keshubai and Konyrtemirshi mountains of the Kazakh Uplands. It heads roughly northwards, bending northeastwards by Mount Ku. After leaving the mountain to the west it flows northwards again. Shortly before reaching the 51st parallel north the Tundik bends northeastwards. Finally it reaches salt lake Karasor and enters it from the western shore.

The width of the river valley in the upper course is between 0.2 km (0.12 mi) and 0.3 km (0.19 mi), in the middle stretch between 1 km (0.62 mi) and 2 km (1.2 mi), and in the lower reaches of the river the valley widens, reaching 7 km (4.3 mi) to 10 km (6.2 mi). The riverbanks are mostly steep, between 1 m (3 ft 3 in) and 2 m (6 ft 7 in).

=== Tributaries ===
The main tributaries of the Tundik are the 67 km (42 mi) long Bala Tundik, with its sources in Mount Ku, on the left, and 78 km (48 mi) long Ashchyshiozek on the right. Other major tributaries are 48 km (30 mi) long Kyzylashchy, 37 km (23 mi) long Akzharyk, 30 km (19 mi) long Upper Karasu, 35 km (22 mi) long Lower Karasu, 21 km (13 mi) long Sarybulak, 21 km (13 mi) long Egindibulak, 17 km (11 mi) long Zharkayin and 10 km (6.2 mi) long Kundik .

== See also ==
- List of rivers of Kazakhstan
