= Mawsonia =

Mawsonia may refer to:

- Mawsonia (fish), an extinct genus of prehistoric coelacanth fish which lived during the Cretaceous period
- Mawsonia (fungus), a genus of fungi within the family Lichinaceae
