= Chugul Island =

Alaskan island in the Bering Sea

Coordinates: 51°56′37″N 175°49′14″W

Location in Alaska

Chugul (Russian: Чугул) is a small island located in the center of the Andreanof Islands of the Aleutian Islands of Alaska. It is one in a group of small islands that are situated between Adak Island and Atka Island. Nearby islands include Igitkin and Tagalak. Its length is 7.5 kilometres (4.7 mi) and its width is 5.7 kilometres (3.5 mi).

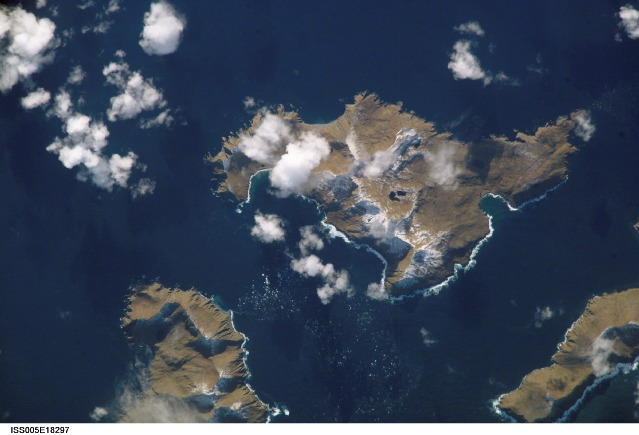
NASA photo of Chugul Island
