= Davis Peninsula =

Peninsula in Queen Mary Land, Antarctica

Coordinates: 66°35′S 98°47′E

The Davis Peninsula is an elongated ice-covered peninsula, 3 nautical miles (6 km) wide, between Reid Glacier and Northcliffe Glacier. It was discovered in November 1912 by the Australasian Antarctic Expedition under Mawson, who named it for Captain John King Davis.
