= Adlavik Islands =

- Unincorporated community
- Location of Adlavik in Newfoundland
- Coordinates: 54.9847727°N 58.7867224°W
- Country: Canada
- Province: Newfoundland and Labrador
- Settled: 1911
- Time zone: UTC-4 (Atlantic Time)
  - Summer (DST): UTC-3 (Atlantic Daylight Time)
- Area code: 709

The Adlavik Islands are a set of islands on the coast of Labrador, northwest of Cape Harrisson. They lie along the outer edge of the Labrador mainland, forming part of a chain of islands that extends north of Hamilton Inlet toward Kingitok and Kayaksuatilik Islands. Geologically, the islands are composed of ancient volcanic and sedimentary rocks, intruded by various igneous formations.

== Toponymy ==
The name Adlavik originates from the Inuit languages and can be translated as "the place of black bears" or "place where Indians were killed". The name originally referred to a natural harbor and bay, and was later also used for the nearby archipelago. The name includes the locative suffix -vik, which means "place (of)". It may have been called Adnavik and a port of call as early as 1911.

== Geography ==
The Adlavik Islands lie along the outer coastal fringe of Labrador, opposite the mainland and to the north of Hamilton Inlet. It extends northwest toward Kingitok Island and Kayaksuatilik Island. They form part of a chain of islands that characterize the rugged and sparsely populated Labrador coastline.

The Adlavik Islands are primarily underlain by the Aillik Group, an Aphebian-aged supracrustal sequence composed of volcanic and sedimentary units. These are intruded by a variety of felsic to intermediate plutonic rocks, ranging from synkinematic to postkinematic phases. The islands' geology includes mafic volcanic rocks and volcanic breccia, which exhibit strong shearing. These rocks provide evidence of ancient volcanic activity and are frequently altered by epidote and potassic feldspar.

Volcanic breccias and sheared mafic volcanics are often preserved as enclaves within younger intrusive units such as granite and quartz monzonite, suggesting interaction between different magmatic and tectonic phases. A significant portion of the islands is composed of intrusive rocks belonging to the Adlavik Intrusive Suite, which is dominated by gabbro and leucogabbro. These coarse-grained igneous rocks contain primary minerals such as clinopyroxene, hornblende, and biotite. Field studies have observed layering within the gabbroic units, although such features are not consistently visible across all inland exposures.

== See also ==
- List of ghost towns in Newfoundland and Labrador
