= Alkamergen =

- Алқамерген
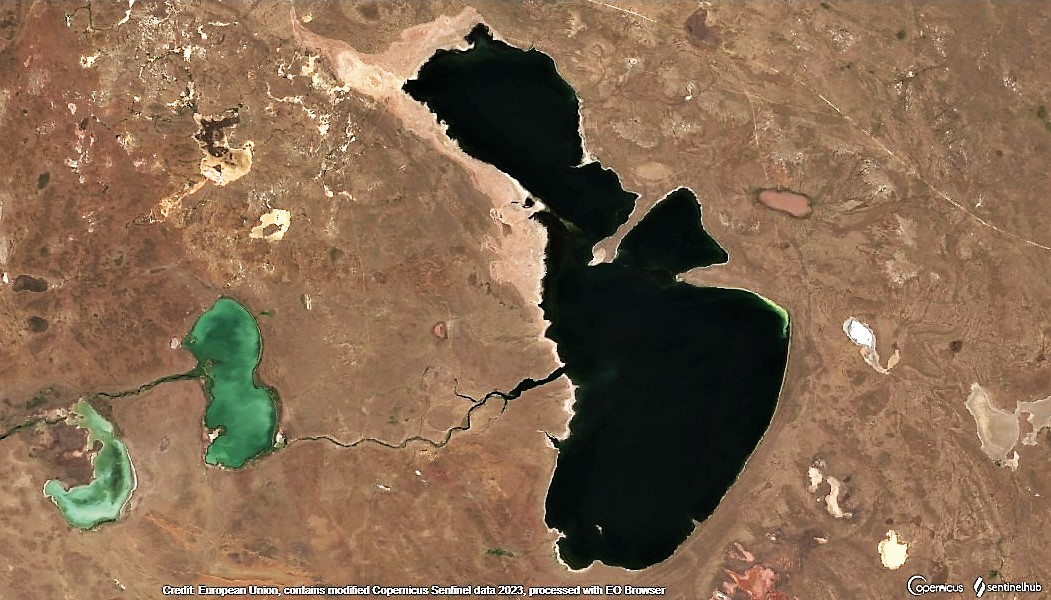
- Sentinel-2 picture of the lake in June

- Location within Kazakhstan
- Location: Kazakh Uplands
- Coordinates: 51°06′42″N 76°39′10″E
- Type: brackish lake
- Primary inflows: Ashchysu
- Catchment area: 1,475 square kilometers (570 sq mi)
- Basin countries: Kazakhstan
- Max. length: 12.8 kilometers (8.0 mi)
- Max. width: 5.3 kilometers (3.3 mi)
- Surface area: 34 square kilometers (13 sq mi)
- Surface elevation: 190 meters (620 ft)

Alkamergen (Kazakh: Алқамерген) is a lake in May District, Pavlodar Region, Kazakhstan.

The lake lies in the western part of May District, 70 kilometers (43 mi) northeast of the town of Bayanaul.

== Geography ==
Alkamergen lies in a tectonic depression of the Kazakh Uplands, roughly 60 kilometers (37 mi) to the northeast of the northeastern slopes of the Bayanaul Range. It is one of the largest lakes in the district. There are a number of smaller lakes in its vicinity. Sulysor, the largest one, is located to the west of the southern shore. Altybaysor lies 39 kilometers (24 mi) to the north. Zhamantuz (May District) 13 kilometers (8.1 mi) to the east and larger lake Karasor 50 kilometers (31 mi) to the east.

River Ashchysu flows into Alkamergen from the west. The water of the lake is brackish, fresher in the spring and with increased salinity in the summer. In years of drought the level of Alkamergen sinks and the northern end becomes a separate lake connected with the southern section by a narrow sound.

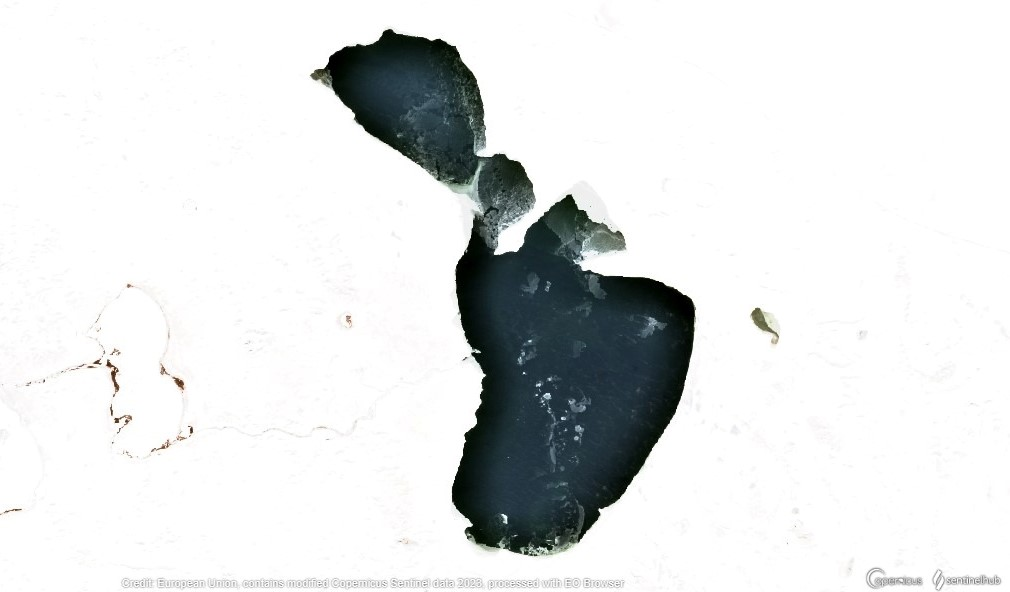
Sentinel-2 image of the lake in February.

== Flora and fauna ==
The shores of the lake are mostly flat. The main fish species in Alkamergen are pike, perch and common bream.

== See also ==
- List of lakes of Kazakhstan
