= Jamantuz, May District =

Lake in Kazakhstan

Zhamantuz
- Жамантұз
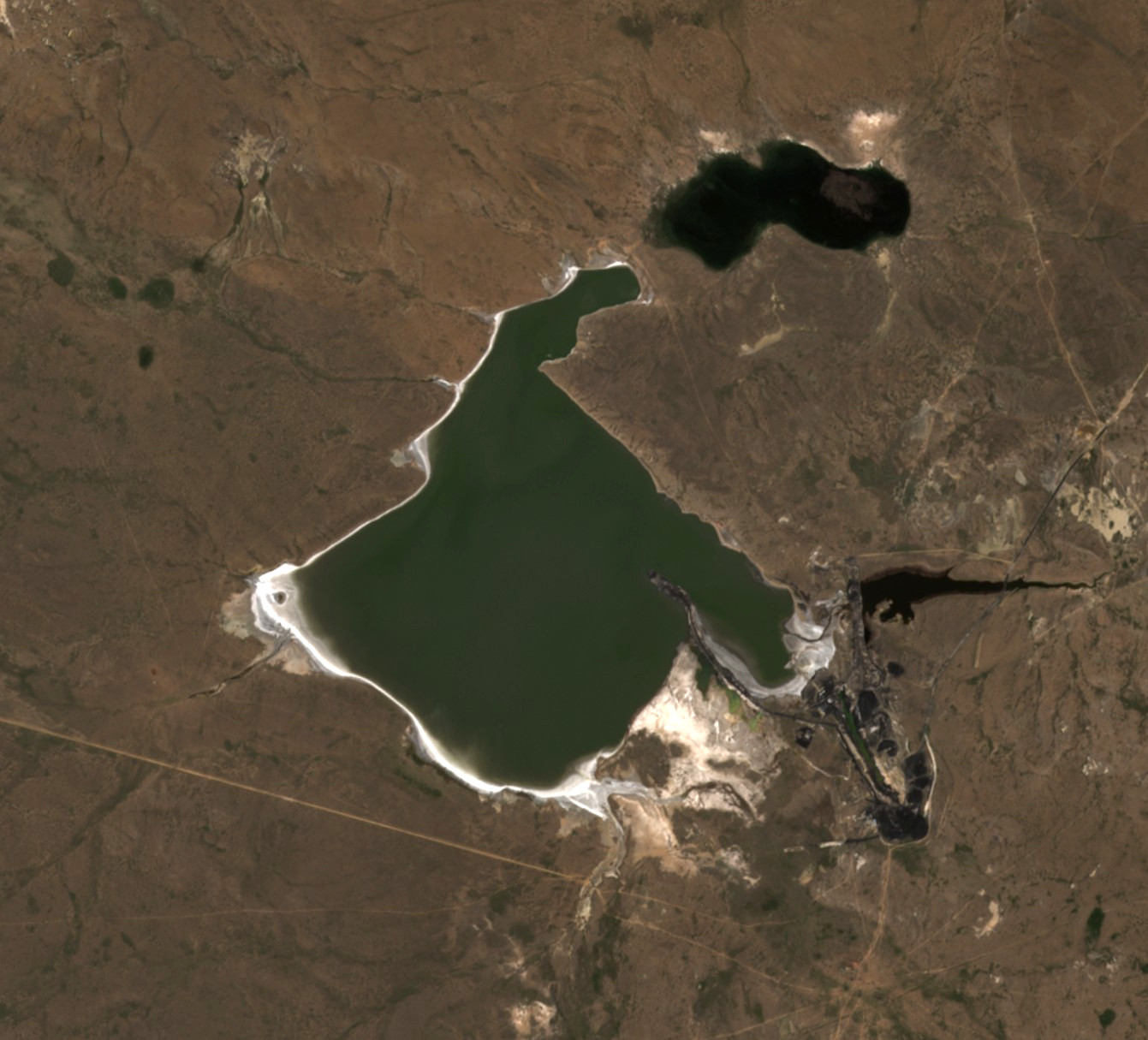
- Sentinel-2 picture of the lake

- Location within Kazakhstan
- Location: Kazakh Uplands
- Coordinates: 51°08′30″N 76°55′00″E
- Type: endorheic lake
- Basin countries: Kazakhstan
- Max. length: 4.8 kilometers (3.0 mi)
- Max. width: 3.1 kilometers (1.9 mi)
- Surface area: 19.8 square kilometers (7.6 sq mi)
- Residence time: UTC+6:00
- Shore length^{1}: 20 kilometers (12 mi)
- Surface elevation: 142 meters (466 ft)
- ^{1} Shore length is not a well-defined measure.

Zhamantuz (Kazakh: Жамантұз) is a salt lake in the May District, Pavlodar Region, Kazakhstan.

The lake lies in the western part of May District, 60 kilometers (37 mi) to the WSW of Maytubek village. The Bolshoy Togyzbay and Kainama winter resorts are located near the lake. The area surrounding Zhamantuz is used for livestock grazing.

== Geography ==
Zhamantuz is an endorheic lake of the northern end of the Kazakh Uplands, part of the Irtysh river basin. It lies at an elevation of 123.5 meters (405 ft). The Irtysh flows 63 kilometers (39 mi) to the northeast of the lake.

The lake freezes in mid November and stays under ice until the second half of April. There are a number of other lakes in its vicinity, such as Alkamergen 13 kilometers (8.1 mi) to the west, Karasor 35 kilometers (22 mi) to the east and Altybaysor 47 kilometers (29 mi) to the NNW.

== See also ==
- List of lakes of Kazakhstan
