= Karasor, May District =

Karasor
- Қарасор
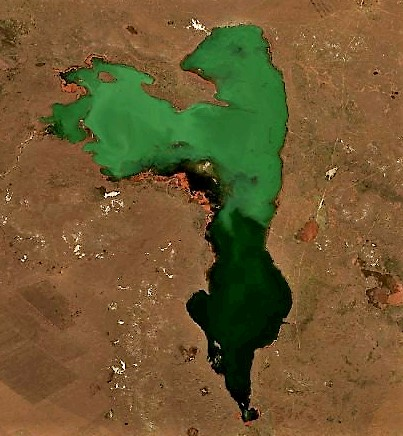
- Sentinel-2 picture of the lake in October

- Location within Kazakhstan
- Location: Kazakh Uplands
- Coordinates: 51°04′50″N 77°30′59″E
- Type: endorheic lake
- Primary inflows: Tundik
- Basin countries: Kazakhstan
- Max. length: 18.2 kilometers (11.3 mi)
- Max. width: 5.6 kilometers (3.5 mi)
- Surface area: 57 square kilometers (22 sq mi)
- Max. depth: 1.2 meters (3 ft 11 in)
- Residence time: UTC+6:00
- Surface elevation: 144 meters (472 ft)

Karasor (Kazakh: Қарасор) is a salt lake in May District, Pavlodar Region, Kazakhstan.

The lake lies in the western part of May District, 25 kilometers (16 mi) southwest of the town of Zhumysker. Karasor is one of the largest lakes in the district.

== Geography ==
Karasor is an endorheic lake of the Kazakh Uplands. The Irtysh flows 33 kilometers (21 mi) to the east of the eastern shores of the lake. There are a number of smaller lakes in its vicinity; the largest is Aktomar, 2 kilometers (1.2 mi) to the northwest. Lake Zhamantuz (May District) lies 35 kilometers (22 mi) to the west and Alkamergen 50 kilometers (31 mi) further.

River Tundik flows into Karasor from the west. The shape of the lake is irregular, very indented, with a southern and a western projection. Although it rarely dries up, in years of drought the level of Karasor sinks, and its southern projection may become a separate lake, also known as Zhinishkesor (Жіңішкесор).

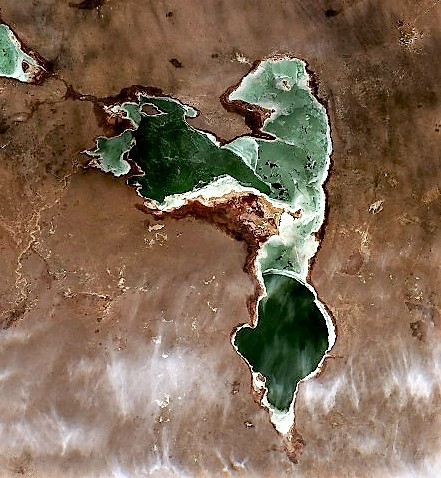
Sentinel-2 image of the lake in November.

== See also ==
- List of lakes of Kazakhstan
