= Mawsonia (fungus) =

Scientific classification
- Domain: Eukaryota
- Kingdom: Fungi
- Division: Ascomycota
- Class: Lichinomycetes
- Order: Lichinales
- Family: Lichinaceae
- Genus: Mawsonia; C.W.Dodge (1948)
- Species: M. harrissonii

Binomial name
- Mawsonia harrissonii C.W.Dodge (1948)

Single-species lichen genus

Mawsonia is a fungal genus in the family Lichinaceae. It is a monospecific genus, containing the single species Mawsonia harrissonii, a rare saxicolous, crustose lichen found in Antarctica.

== Taxonomy ==
Both the genus and species were described by the American lichenologist Carroll William Dodge in 1948. The type specimen was collected from Possession Rocks on the Queen Mary Coast. The species epithet honours the collector of the type, the British naturalist Charles Turnbull Harrisson, who was part of the Australasian Antarctic Expedition (1911–1914) led by Sir Douglas Mawson. It is only known to occur at this location. As of 2016, no molecular sequence data are available for this little-known species.

== Description ==
The lichen has a fruticulose thallus, that is, smaller than a regular fruticose (bushy) thallus. It is black and prostrate, comprising dark, radiating dichotomous branches up to 75 μm in diameter. The photobiont partner is from the green algal genus Trebouxia, with cells measuring 7–8 μm in diameter. Ascospores produced by the lichen are broadly ellipsoid in shape, and measure 8–9 by 5.5–6 μm. They are polaribilocular, meaning they are divided into two components (locules) separated by a central septum with a perforation.
