= Koktobe, Pavlodar Region =

Settlement in Kazakhstan

Coordinates: 51.5292°N 77.4733°E

Koktobe (Kazakh: Көктөбе, Köktöbe) is a village in May District of Pavlodar Region of Kazakhstan. The administrative center of the Koktobinsky rural district, which also includes the Belogorsk HPP, Section-2 and Section-3 with a total population of 4315 people (1999). KATO code - 555630100. Earlier in the village there was the central estate of the Belogorsk state farm, specializing in milk production. In modern Koktobe, there are construction and transport enterprises that provide services for the construction of facilities and transportation. Music and secondary schools, a library with an extensive, constantly updated fund, cinemas and a stadium are open. The smoothly functioning milk plant and bakery meet the needs of local residents, and also sells its products outside of Koktobe.

== Geographical position ==
Koktobe is located 102 km south-east of Pavlodar on the Pavlodar - Aksu - Chagan - Semey highway. Since 2001 - a railway station on the Aksu - Degelen highway.

The average temperature in the area of village in January is -16 ° С, in July it is 21 ° С, the annual amount of atmospheric precipitation is 200–250 mm.

Climate data for Koktobe (1991–2020)
Month	Jan	Feb	Mar	Apr	May	Jun	Jul	Aug	Sep	Oct	Nov	Dec	Year
Mean daily maximum °C (°F)	−11.3 (11.7)	−8.9 (16.0)	−0.7 (30.7)	13.9 (57.0)	21.7 (71.1)	26.7 (80.1)	27.8 (82.0)	26.2 (79.2)	19.7 (67.5)	11.3 (52.3)	−0.6 (30.9)	−7.7 (18.1)	9.8 (49.6)
Daily mean °C (°F)	−16.0 (3.2)	−14.2 (6.4)	−6.0 (21.2)	7.2 (45.0)	14.8 (58.6)	20.3 (68.5)	21.7 (71.1)	19.6 (67.3)	12.9 (55.2)	5.2 (41.4)	−5.2 (22.6)	−12.3 (9.9)	4.0 (39.2)
Mean daily minimum °C (°F)	−20.4 (−4.7)	−19.1 (−2.4)	−10.7 (12.7)	1.0 (33.8)	7.9 (46.2)	13.9 (57.0)	15.9 (60.6)	13.4 (56.1)	6.8 (44.2)	0.3 (32.5)	−9.2 (15.4)	−16.8 (1.8)	−1.4 (29.5)
Average precipitation mm (inches)	15.3 (0.60)	14.0 (0.55)	18.6 (0.73)	16.9 (0.67)	24.2 (0.95)	38.3 (1.51)	48.7 (1.92)	29.2 (1.15)	18.6 (0.73)	19.7 (0.78)	23.0 (0.91)	19.6 (0.77)	286.1 (11.26)
Average precipitation days (≥ 1.0 mm)	4.5	4.3	4.5	4.3	5.1	6.7	7.1	5.2	4.0	5.3	5.7	6.0	62.7
Source: NOAA

== Population ==
In 1985, the population of the village was 4622 people, in 1999 - people (2032 men and 2099 women). According to the 2009 census it was 3,815 (2009 census results): people (1827 men and 1988 women) lived in the village. At the beginning of 2019, the population of the village was 3445 people (1694 men and 1751 women).

Koktobinsky rural district includes the settlements of Koktobe Belogorsky HSP, Branch and Branch-2-3 with a total population of 4315 people (1999).

== History ==
Kөktөbe signifies "Green Hill". Prior to 1992, the village was called Belogorie ("White Hill" in Russian). The village of Belogorye was founded in 1932 in connection with the operation of the alabaster factory. The name was given by the high steep bank of the river, where alabaster was mined.

Belogorye was the central estate of the former dairy farm "Belogorskiy", formed in 1961 on the basis of the lands of the sub-farm of the combine "Maikainzoloto", part of the lands of the state farm "Kyzylkuraminskiy", the collective farm "Lenin Zholy", cattle drive and the state land fund. Combine engineer of the state farm "Belogorsky", inventor of the wide-cut reaper "Belogorka" V. I. Ladygin was awarded the title of Hero of Socialist Labor.

On March 19, 1992, by the resolution of the Presidium of the Supreme Soviet of Kazakhstan, the village was renamed into Koktobe.
