= Possession Rocks =

Rock formations in Antarctica

- Location within Antarctica

Highest point
- Elevation: 160 m (520 ft)
- Coordinates: 66°45′S 98°51′E

Geography
- Location: East of Northcliffe Glacier, Antarctica

Climbing
- First ascent: Discovered in December 1912
- Easiest route: Sledge expedition

Possession Rocks (66°45′S 98°51′E) are two small rock outcrops just east of Northcliffe Glacier, above which they rise to 160 metres. Discovered by the Eastern Sledge Party under Frank Wild of the Australasian Antarctic Expedition, 1911–14, and so named following a ceremony in December 1912 of claiming this area for the British Crown.
