= Kennedy Island Conservancy =

Canadian conservation area

- IUCN category II (national park)
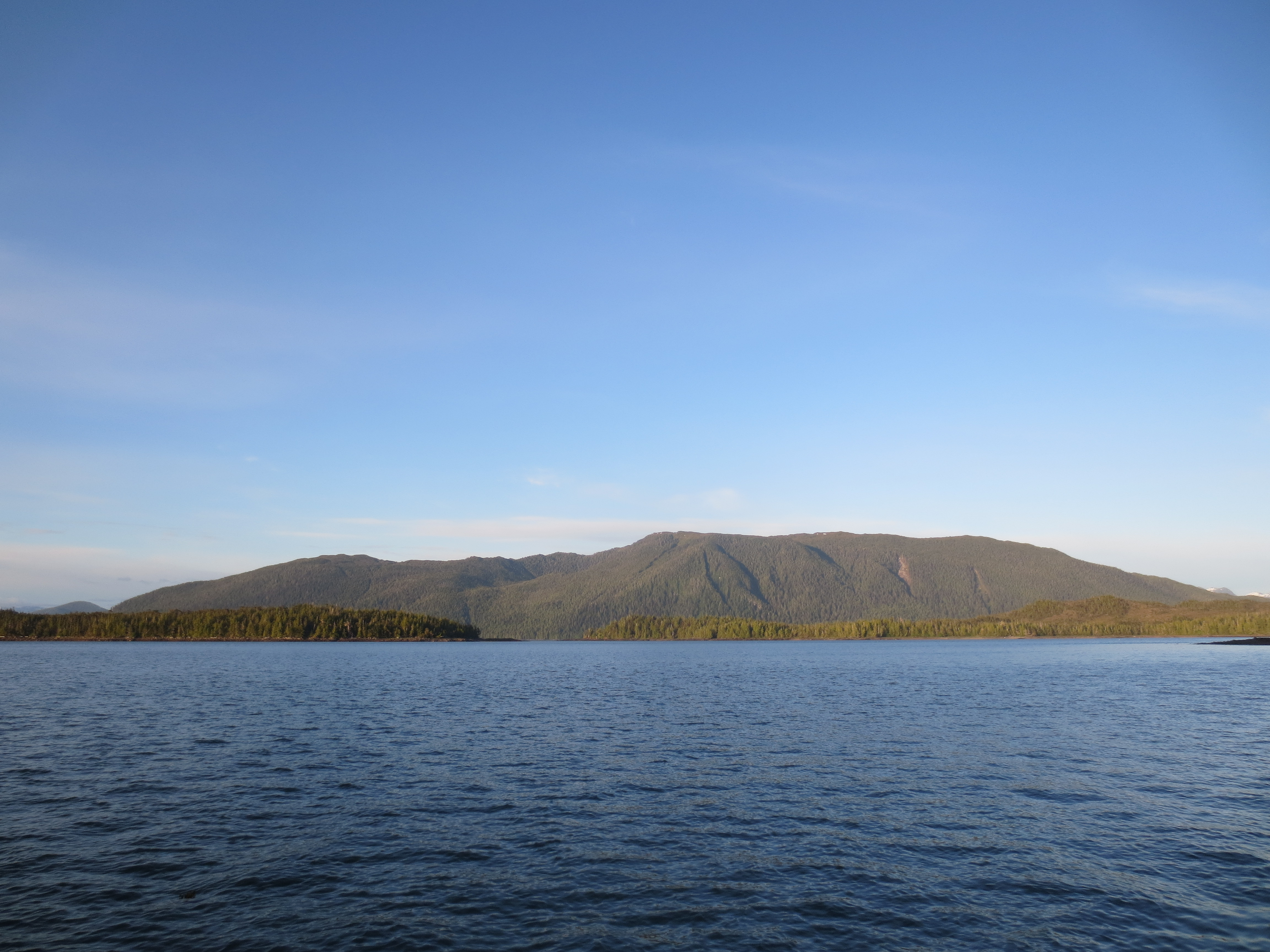
- Western side of Kennedy Island Conservancy

- Location within British Columbia
- Location: Canada
- Coordinates: 54°02′10″N 130°11′15″W
- Area: 4,970 ha (19.2 sq mi)
- Established: June 27, 2008
- Operator: BC Parks

Kennedy Island Conservancy protects all 4,970 hectares (12,300 acres) of Kennedy Island in British Columbia, Canada. The island contains many culturally modified trees and other cultural values and is a gathering location for First Nations travelling upon the Skeena River.

There are two peaks near the middle of the island, one at 724 metres (2,375 ft) and Elizabeth Peak at 753 metres (2,470 ft).

== History ==
Gitxaała describe dwelling on the island when travelling from Lach Klan to their oolichan fishing site on the mouth of the Nass River. Almost one thousand culturally modified trees were recorded on a small part of the conservancy.

== Ecology ==
Kennedy Island’s forests are exhibiting yellow cedar decline patterns common in coastal islands and lowland areas in North Coast Regional District.

This decline is a significant ecological process affecting the island’s forest composition, reducing structural diversity in low-elevation forests, leaving standing dead trees that alter habitat for birds and mammals.
