= Harrisson Ice Rises =

The Harrisson Ice Rises (66°27′S 96°39′E) are a local swelling of the ice surface 12 nautical miles (22 km) west-southwest of Henderson Island, Antarctica, where the Shackleton Ice Shelf overrides an underlying obstruction. The feature was discovered by the Eastern Sledge Party of the Australasian Antarctic Expedition (1911–14) under Douglas Mawson, who named the feature for Charles T. Harrisson, biologist with the expedition.
