= Tagalak Island =

Island in Alaska, United States

Coordinates: 51°57′44″N 175°43′12″W

Location in Alaska

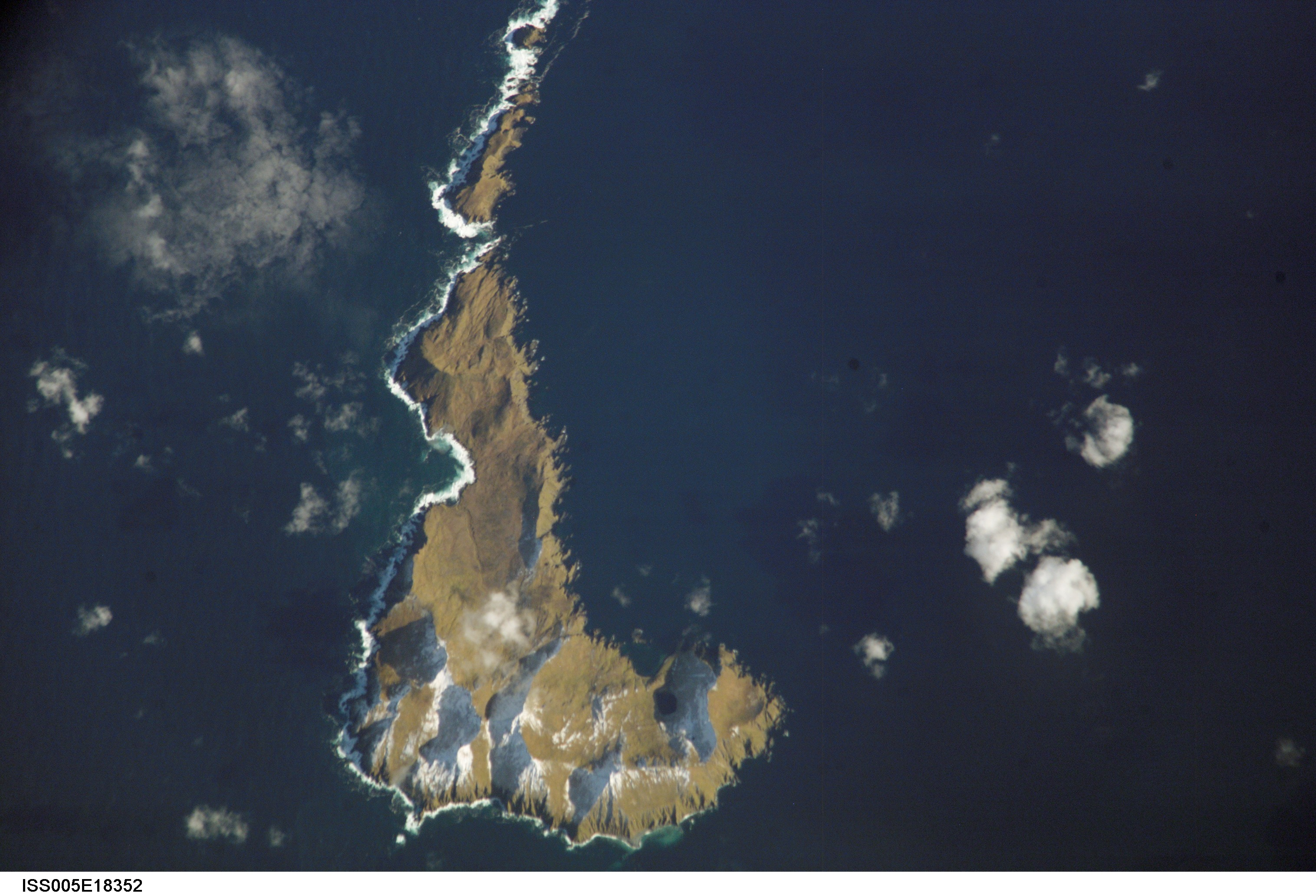
Tagalak Island

Tagalak Island (Aleut: Tagalax̂) is an island located in the central area of the Andreanof Islands of the Aleutian Islands of Alaska. West of the island lies Chugul. The island is 6.3 kilometres (3.9 mi) long and 7 kilometres (4.3 mi) wide.

== History ==
A brief description of the island was provided by Grigory Shelikhov in his account Voyage of Mr. Shelikhov from Okhotsk across the Eastern Ocean to the American Shores, 1783–1790.
