= Koktobe, Almaty Region =

Koktobe
- Village
- Location in Kazakhstan
- Coordinates: 43°15′38″N 76°58′35″E
- Country: Kazakhstan
- Region: Almaty Region
- Time zone: UTC+6 (Omsk Time)

Koktobe is a village in Eskeldi District of Almaty Region, in south-eastern Kazakhstan.
