= Northcliffe Glacier =

Glacier in Antarctica

- Location within Antarctica
- Location: Queen Mary Land
- Coordinates: 66°40′S 98°52′E
- Thickness: unknown
- Status: unknown

Northcliffe Glacier (66°40′S 98°52′E) is a glacier descending to the coast immediately east of Davis Peninsula, in Antarctica. It was discovered by the Australasian Antarctic Expedition, 1911–14, under Mawson, and named for Lord Northcliffe, of London, a patron of the expedition.

== See also ==
- List of glaciers in the Antarctic
- Glaciology
