= May District, Kazakhstan =

Coordinates: 50°56′24″N 77°31′12″E

May
- District
- Май ауданы
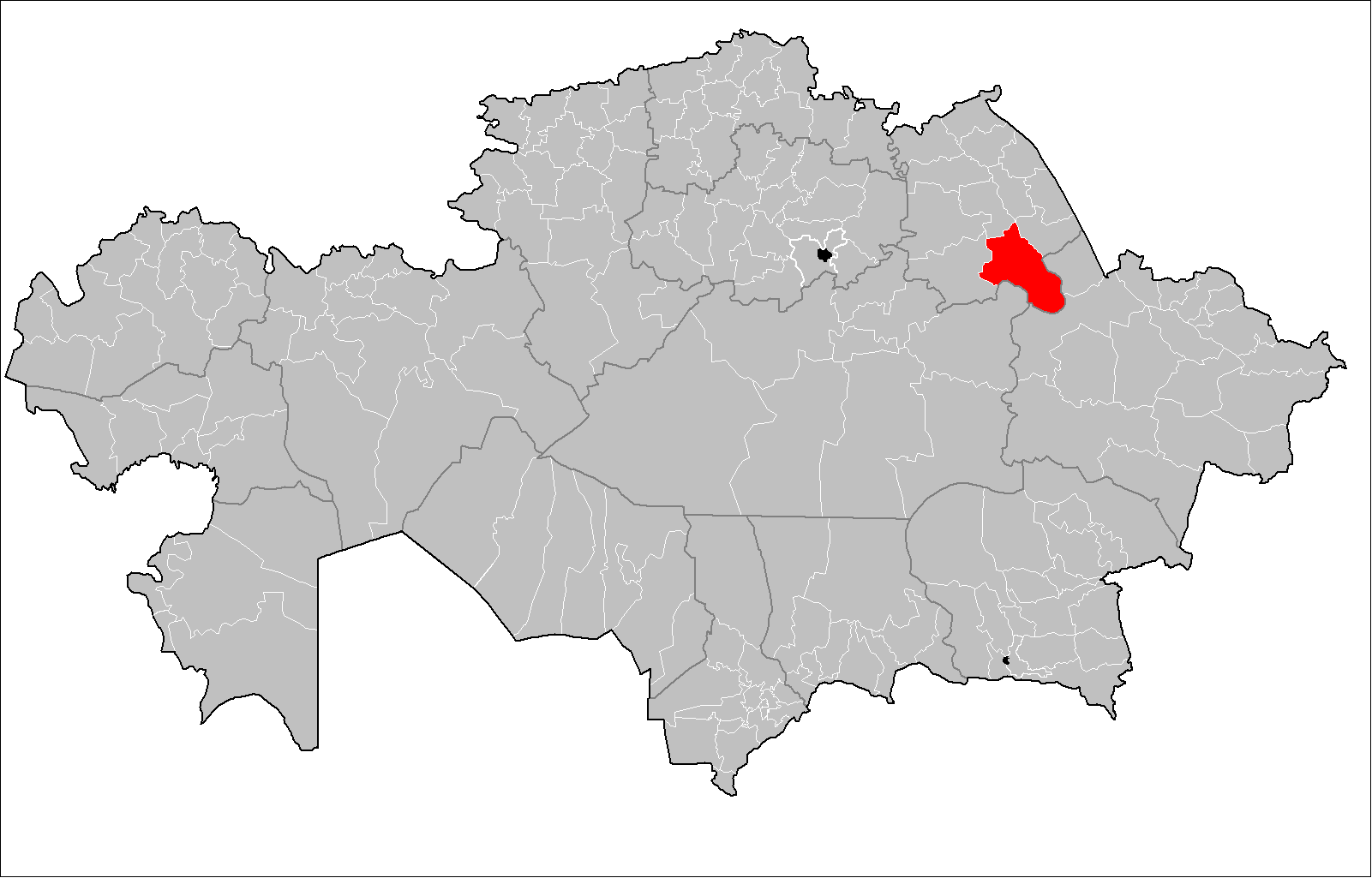
- Country: Kazakhstan
- Region: Pavlodar Region
- Administrative center: Koktobe
- Founded: 1939

Government
  - Akim: Amirin Agybai Koishybayevich

Population (2013)
  - Total: 11,787
- Time zone: UTC+6 (East)

May (MY; Kazakh: Май ауданы, Mai audany) is a district of Pavlodar Region in northern Kazakhstan. The administrative center of the district is the selo of Koktobe. Population: 11,787 (2013 estimate); 12,601 (2009 census results); 16,859 (1999 census results).

== Geography ==
May District lies in the Kazakh Uplands. The Irtysh River flows in the northern limit and Alkamergen, Karasor and Zhamantuz are the largest lakes.
