= Igitkin Island =

Island in Alaska, United States

Coordinates: 51°58′55″N 175°53′44″W

Location in Alaska

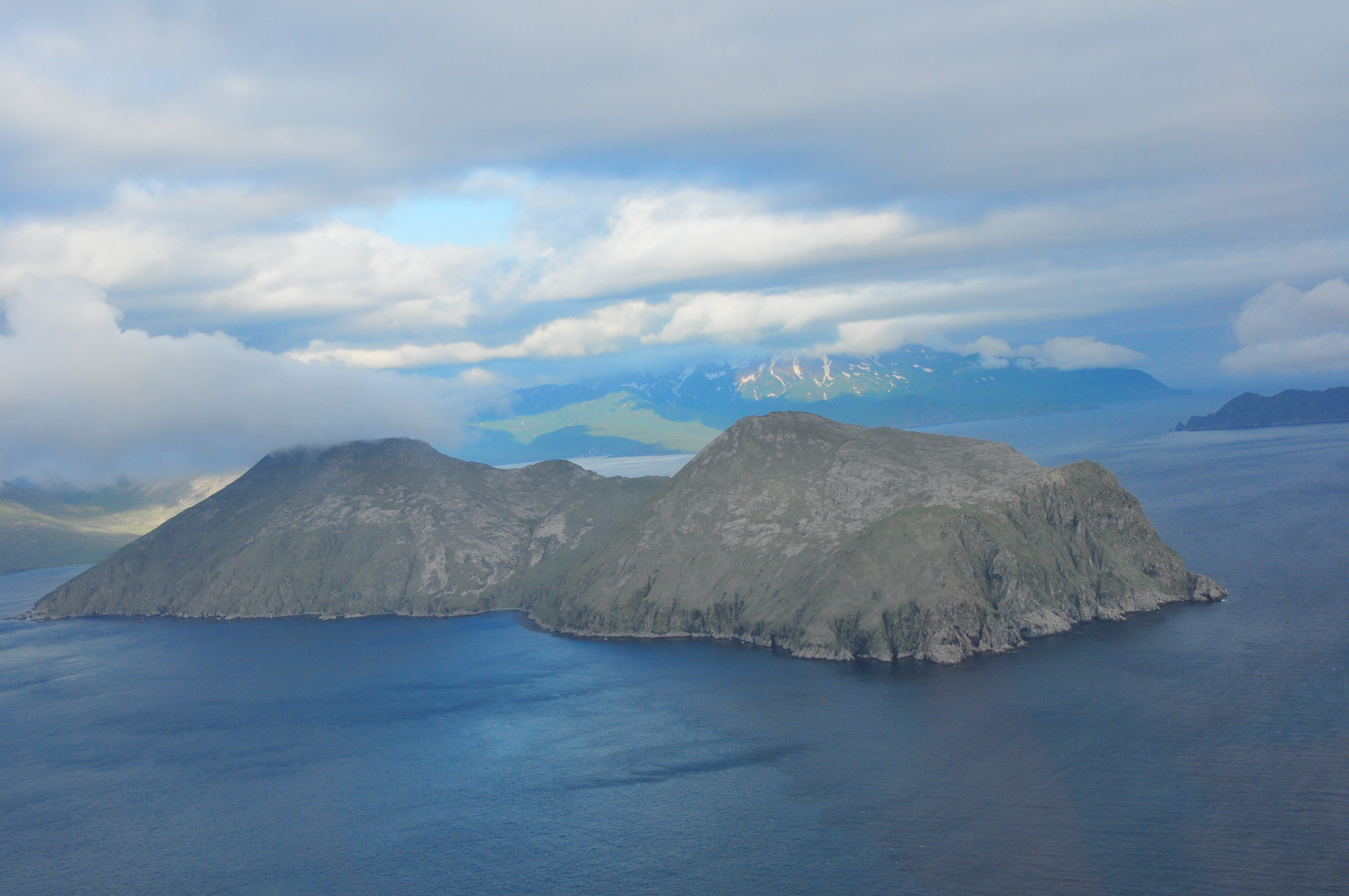
Igitkin Island. Great Sitkin Island can be seen in the background.

Igitkin Island (Aleut: Igitxix̂; Russian: Игиткин остров) is a small island located in an area between Adak Island and Atka Island among other small islands. The island belongs to the Andreanof Islands of the Aleutian Islands of Alaska.

The island measures 3.8 kilometres (2.4 mi) long and 11 kilometres (6.8 mi) wide.
