= Toraigyr =

Lake in Kazakhstan

- Торайғыр
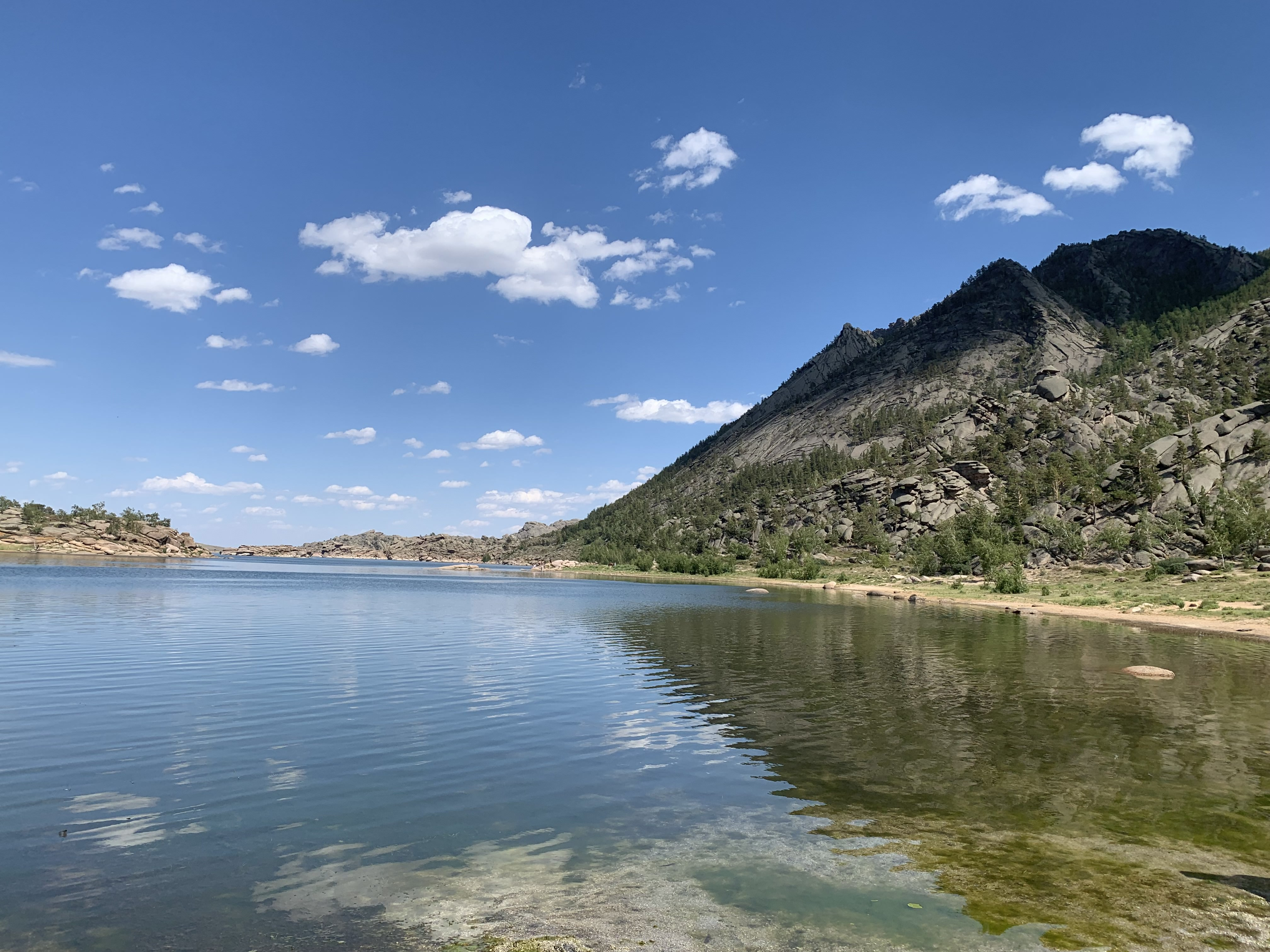
- Panorama of the lake

- Location within Kazakhstan
- Location: Bayanaul Range
- Coordinates: 50°52′N 75°39′E
- Type: Tectonic
- Catchment area: 12.9 square kilometers (5.0 sq mi)
- Basin countries: Kazakhstan
- Max. length: 1.8 kilometers (1.1 mi)
- Max. width: 0.6 kilometers (0.37 mi)
- Surface area: 0.88 square kilometers (0.34 sq mi)
- Average depth: 6 meters (20 ft)
- Max. depth: 11 meters (36 ft)
- Shore length^{1}: 5 kilometers (3.1 mi)
- Surface elevation: 345 meters (1,132 ft)
- Settlements: Bayanaul
- ^{1} Shore length is not a well-defined measure.

Toraigyr (Kazakh: Торайғыр) is a lake in Bayanaul District, Pavlodar Region, Kazakhstan.

Toraigyr falls within the perimeter of the Bayanaul National Park, a protected area. The lake is one of the places in Kazakhstan named after Kazakh poet Sultanmahmut Toraygirov.

== Geography ==
Toraigyr is an elongated lake that lies in the Bayanaul Range, below the slopes of the northern side of the mountains. It is the third largest lake of the Bayanaul area. Mount Akbet, the highest point of the range, is located nearby. There are two rocky islets near the southwestern end of the lake. Part of the shore is rocky and the water is slightly brackish.

Toraigyr village lies close to the western shore of the lake. The nearest town is Bayanaul, located 8 kilometers (5.0 mi) to the southeast.

== Fauna ==
The main fish species in Toraigyr lake are carp and perch.

== See also ==
- List of lakes of Kazakhstan
