= Bayanaul (disambiguation) =

Bayanaul (Kazakh: Бая́науы́л, Russian: Баянаул) can refer to:

- Bayanaul, the capital of Bayanaul District, Kazakhstan
- Bayanaul District, a district in Pavlodar Region, Kazakhstan
- Bayanaul Range, a mountain range of the Kazakh Uplands
- Bayanaul National Park, a protected area in the range
