= Sabyndykol =

Lake in Kazakhstan

- Сабындыкөл
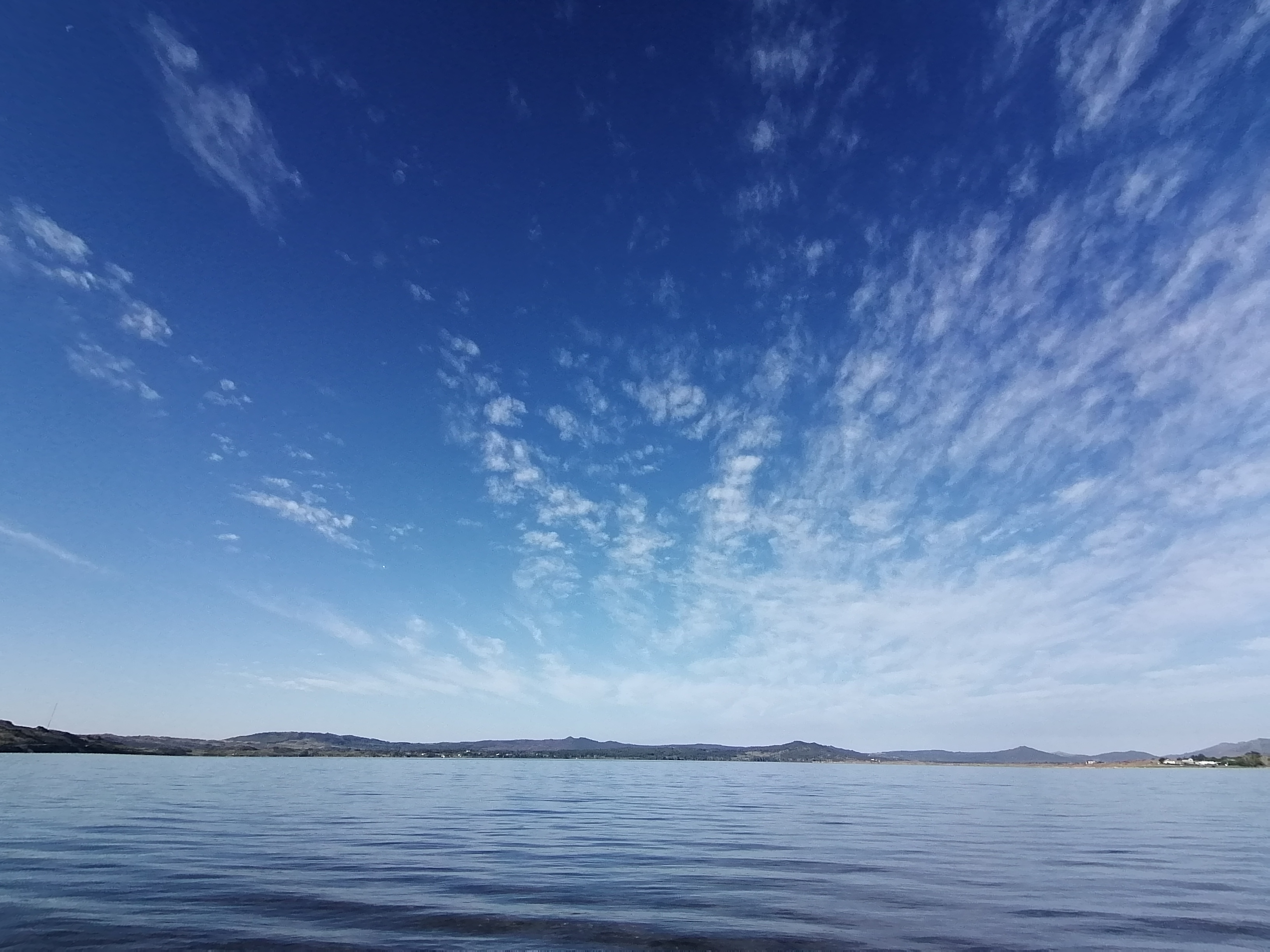
- Panorama of the lake

- Location within Kazakhstan
- Location: Bayanaul Range
- Coordinates: 50°46′N 75°42′E
- Catchment area: 95.9 square kilometers (37.0 sq mi)
- Basin countries: Kazakhstan
- Max. length: 4.5 kilometers (2.8 mi)
- Max. width: 2.87 kilometers (1.78 mi)
- Surface area: 7.08 square kilometers (2.73 sq mi)
- Average depth: 6 meters (20 ft)
- Max. depth: 9.5 meters (31 ft)
- Shore length^{1}: 15 kilometers (9.3 mi)
- Surface elevation: 452.7 meters (1,485 ft)
- Islands: none
- Settlements: Bayanaul
- ^{1} Shore length is not a well-defined measure.

Sabyndykol (Kazakh: Сабындыкөл) is a lake in Bayanaul District, Pavlodar Region, Kazakhstan.

The lake lies by the town of Bayanaul, located on the northern shore. Sabyndykol falls within the perimeter of the Bayanaul National Park, a protected area.

== Geography ==
Sabyndykol lies in a small tectonic depression of the Kazakh Uplands, just below the slopes of Bayanaul Range, to the south of the eastern part of the mountains. It is the largest of the lakes of the range area, but Tuzkol, located 40 kilometers (25 mi) to the southwest, is the largest of the district.

The water of Sabyndykol is fresh. There are no big rivers flowing into the lake, only intermittent streams, the largest of which has its mouth in the northwestern shore. The lake has a maximum depth of 9 meters (30 ft) to 9.5 meters (31 ft) in the deepest areas. The northern, southern and southeastern shores are steep with 5 meters (16 ft) to 10 meters (33 ft) high cliffs, which in some places merge with the rocky slopes of the range. The eastern shore is sandy and gently sloping.

== Flora and fauna ==
The flat sections of the shoreline are overgrown with reeds. The main fish species found in the lake are pike, roach, tench and perch, but not in great numbers.

== See also ==
- List of lakes of Kazakhstan
