= Zhanatilek =

Zhanatilek Жаңатілек
- Location in Kazakhstan
- Coordinates: 50°29′52″N 75°12′09″E
- Country: Kazakhstan
- Region: Pavlodar Region
- District: Bayanaul District

Population (2009)
  - Total: 1,197
- Time zone: UTC+6
- Postcode: 140304

Zhanatilek (Kazakh: Жаңатілек) is a settlement in Pavlodar Region, Kazakhstan. It is part of Bayanaul District and the administrative center of the Zhanatilek rural district (KATO code - 553641100). Population: 1,197 (2009 census results); 1,553 (1999 census results).

== Geography ==
Zhanatilek lies in the Kazakh Uplands, 47 kilometers (29 mi) southwest of Bayanaul, near lake Tuzkol. The Ashchysu river flows to the west of the village.
