= List of lakes of Kazakhstan =

Excluding the northernmost districts, Kazakhstan consists of endorheic basins, where rivers flow into one of the numerous lakes. The most important drainage system is known as Yedisu, meaning "seven rivers" in Turkic languages. Below is a list of the more important lakes, some of which are shared (Caspian Sea, Lake Aral, Lake Aike, etc.) with the neighbouring countries.

Lake name	Surface area	Region	Notes
Caspian Sea	371,000 square kilometres (143,244 sq mi)	Atyrau Region, Mangystau Region	The Caspian Sea is the world's largest enclosed body of water.
Alakol	2,650 square kilometres (1,023 sq mi)	Almaty Region	Bird breeding and nesting ground
Aral	17,160 square kilometres (6,626 sq mi)		Shrinking owing to environmental problems
Aralsor	200 square kilometres (77 sq mi)	West Kazakhstan Region	Pink lake
Ashchykol	74 square kilometres (29 sq mi)	Kyzylorda Region / Turkistan Region	Main lake of the Ashchykol Depression
Ayke	64.7 square kilometres (25 sq mi)	Aktobe Region	
Azhibeksor			SW of Lake Tengiz
Balkhash	16,996 square kilometres (6,562 sq mi)	Almaty Region, Karagandy Region, Jambyl Region	
Balyktykol	9.2 square kilometres (4 sq mi)	Abai Region	
Bartogay		Almaty Region	Reservoir on the Chilik River
Bolshoy Azhbulat		Pavlodar Region	
Chagan			Artificial lake (Former nuclear test site)
Issyk	0.22 square kilometres (0 sq mi)	Almaty Region	Not to be confused with Issyk Kul Lake in Kyrgyzstan
Jasybay	4 square kilometres (2 sq mi)	Pavlodar Region	One of the lakes of the Bayanaul Range
Karasor	154 square kilometres (59 sq mi)	Karaganda Region	
Kayindi		Almaty Region	
Kamyslybas	176 square kilometres (68 sq mi)		
Kapchagay			also spelled Qapshaghay Bogeni Reservoir
Koksengirsor	46.3 square kilometres (18 sq mi)	North Kazakhstan Region	Has local economic importance
Kopa	14 square kilometres (5 sq mi)	Akmola Region	
Markakol	455 square kilometres (176 sq mi)		
Sasykkol	600 square kilometres (232 sq mi)	Almaty Region	Surface can reach 736 square kilometres (284 sq mi)
Shalkarteniz	1,800 square kilometres (695 sq mi)	Aktobe Region	
Shureksor	80 square kilometres (31 sq mi)	Pavlodar Region	
Tengiz	1,382 square kilometres (534 sq mi)	Akmola Region	Bird breeding and nesting ground
Toraigyr	0.88 square kilometres (0 sq mi)	Pavlodar Region	One of the lakes of the Bayanaul Range
Tuzkol	13.5 square kilometres (5 sq mi)	Pavlodar Region	Salt lake in Bayanaul District
Ulken-Karoy	305 square kilometres (118 sq mi)	North Kazakhstan Region	
Zaysan	1,810 square kilometres (699 sq mi)		
Zerenda	11.9 square kilometres (5 sq mi)	Akmola Region	
Zhaksykylysh	74.5 square kilometres (29 sq mi)	Kyzylorda Region	Table salt mining site
Zhasylkol	1 square kilometre (0 sq mi)	Almaty Region	

== See also ==
- Sor (geomorphology)
