= Tuzkol, Bayanaul District =

Tuzkol
- Тұзкөл
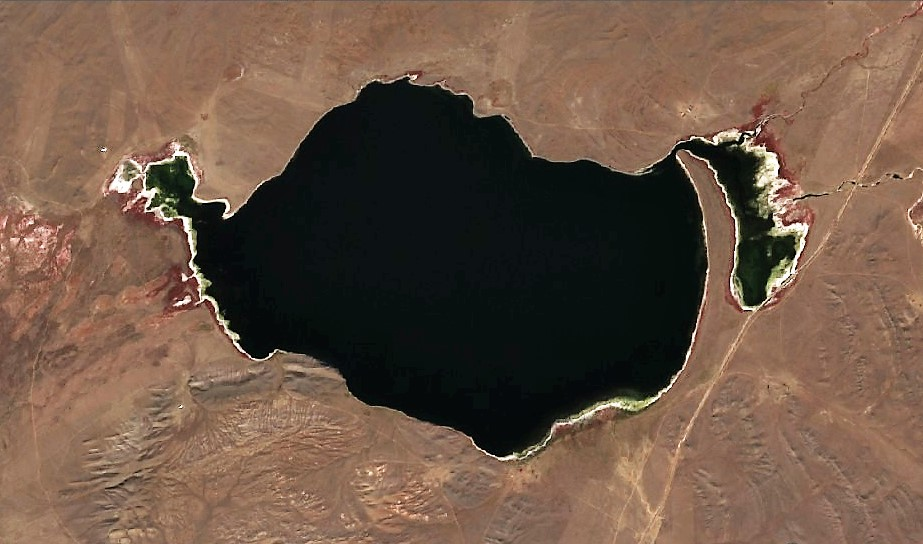
- Sentinel-2 picture of the lake

- Location within Kazakhstan
- Location: Kazakh Uplands
- Coordinates: 50°34′N 75°12′E
- Type: Salt lake
- Basin countries: Kazakhstan
- Max. length: 5 kilometers (3.1 mi)
- Max. width: 3 kilometers (1.9 mi)
- Surface area: 13.5 square kilometers (5.2 sq mi)
- Surface elevation: 426 meters (1,398 ft)
- Islands: none
- Settlements: Zhanatilek, Bayanaul

Tuzkol (Kazakh: Тұзкөл) is a salt lake in Bayanaul District, Pavlodar Region, Kazakhstan.

The lake lies 40 kilometers (25 mi) southwest of the town of Bayanaul.

== Geography ==
Tuzkol lies in a tectonic depression of the Kazakh Uplands to the southwest of the eastern part of the Bayanaul Range and to the east of the Ashchysu river. It is the largest of the lakes of the district. Zhanatilek village is located 4.5 kilometers (2.8 mi) to the south of the southern shore.

River Karasu, an intermittent stream, flows into the lake from the east. The water of the lake is saline, containing magnesium and sodium chloride. There is an 8 centimeters (3.1 in) to 10 centimeters (3.9 in) thick layer of mud at the bottom of the lake emitting a strong hydrogen sulfide smell. The mud is used locally for medicinal purposes.

== See also ==
- List of lakes of Kazakhstan
