= Bayanaul National Park =

National park in Kazakhstan

Bayanaul State National Nature Park
- «Баянауыл» мемлекеттік ұлттық табиғи паркі (Kazakh); Государственный национальный природный парк «Баянаул» (Russian)
- IUCN category II (national park)
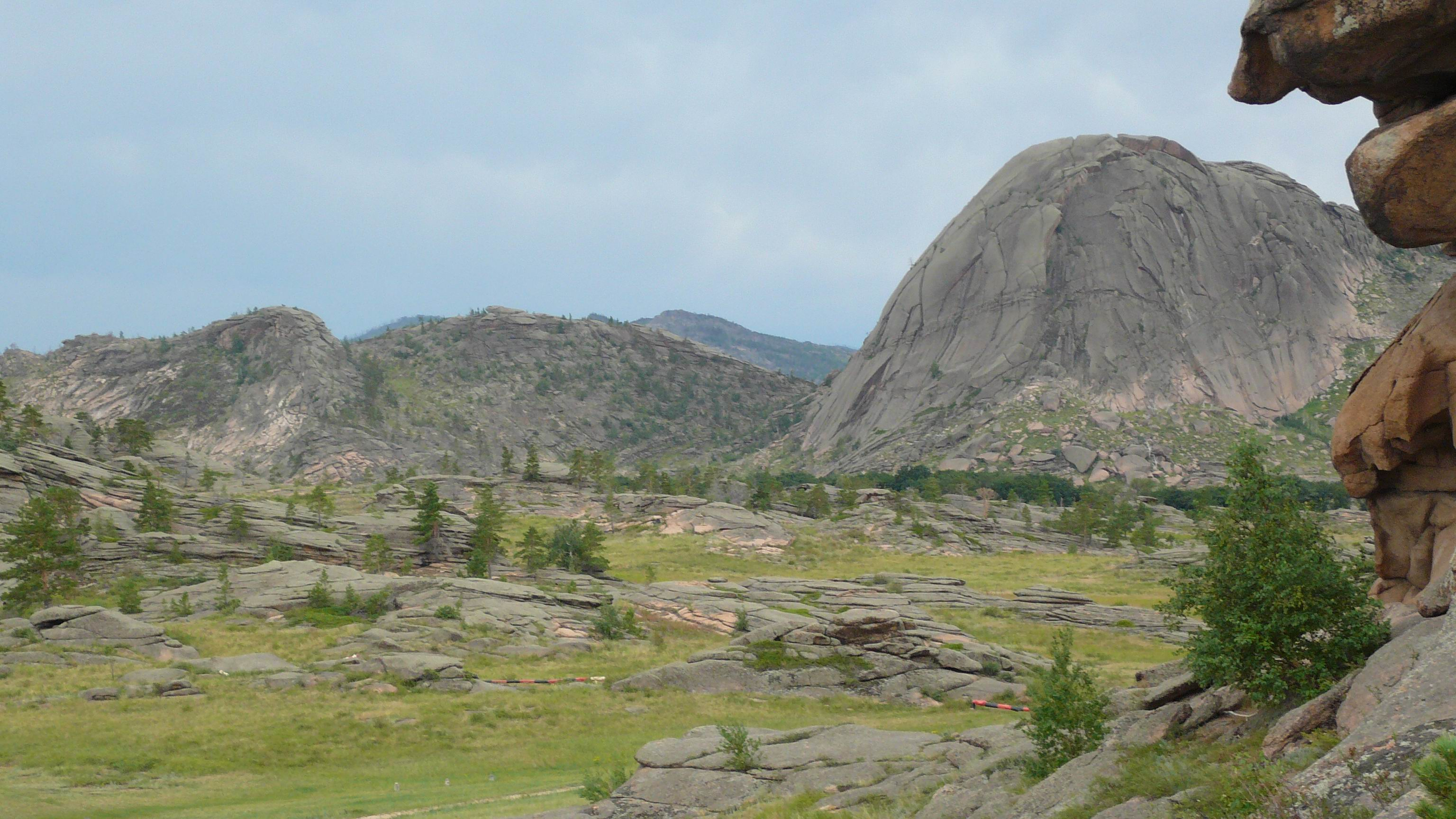
- View of the granite landscape of Bayanaul National Park, with Bulka mountain to the right

- Location within Kazakhstan
- Location: Pavlodar Province, Kazakhstan
- Nearest city: Ekibastuz, Kazakhstan
- Coordinates: 50°49′0″N 75°40′0″E
- Area: 68,453 ha
- Max. elevation: 1,027 m
- Min. elevation: 400 m
- Established: 12 August 1985; 40 years ago

The Bayanaul State National Nature Park (Note: Kazakh: «Баянауыл» мемлекеттік ұлттық табиғи паркі, romanized: «Baianauyl» memlekettık ūlttyq parkı; Russian: Государственный национальный природный парк «Баянаул», romanized: Gosudarstvennyy natsional'nyy prirodnyy park «Bayanaul») is a national park in Kazakhstan located on the outskirts of the Kazakh Uplands in the northeastern Pavlodar Province, 140 km from the city of Ekibastuz. Established in 1985, it is Kazakhstan's first national park. The park encompasses 68,453 hectares and was created to conserve the natural flora and fauna of the Bayanaul Range. It is included on the list of protected areas in Kazakhstan.

== Geography ==
The park contains a portion of the Bayanaul Range, part of the Kazakh Uplands. These mountains took shape during the Paleozoic Era and have since eroded, resulting in their relatively low elevation (400 to 1,027 m). The highest point of the Bayanaul Range is Akbet Mountain (1,027 m), which is contained within the park. According to local legend, Akbet Mountain is named in honour of Akbet, a girl who jumped off its peak when she was required to marry someone who she did not love.

The park has four notable freshwater lakes: Sabyndykol, Jasybay, Toraygir, and Byrzhankol. In addition, there are many smaller lakes, several of which shrink significantly during the dry season. Six of these lakes lie near the top of Nayzatas ("stone spear" in Kazakh) Mountain.

The largest lake is Sabyndykol (Kazakh: Сабындыкөл,Sabyndyköl, literally "soapy lake"), with the village of Bayanaul located on its shores. The lake is named for its "soft water" and soap-like surface.

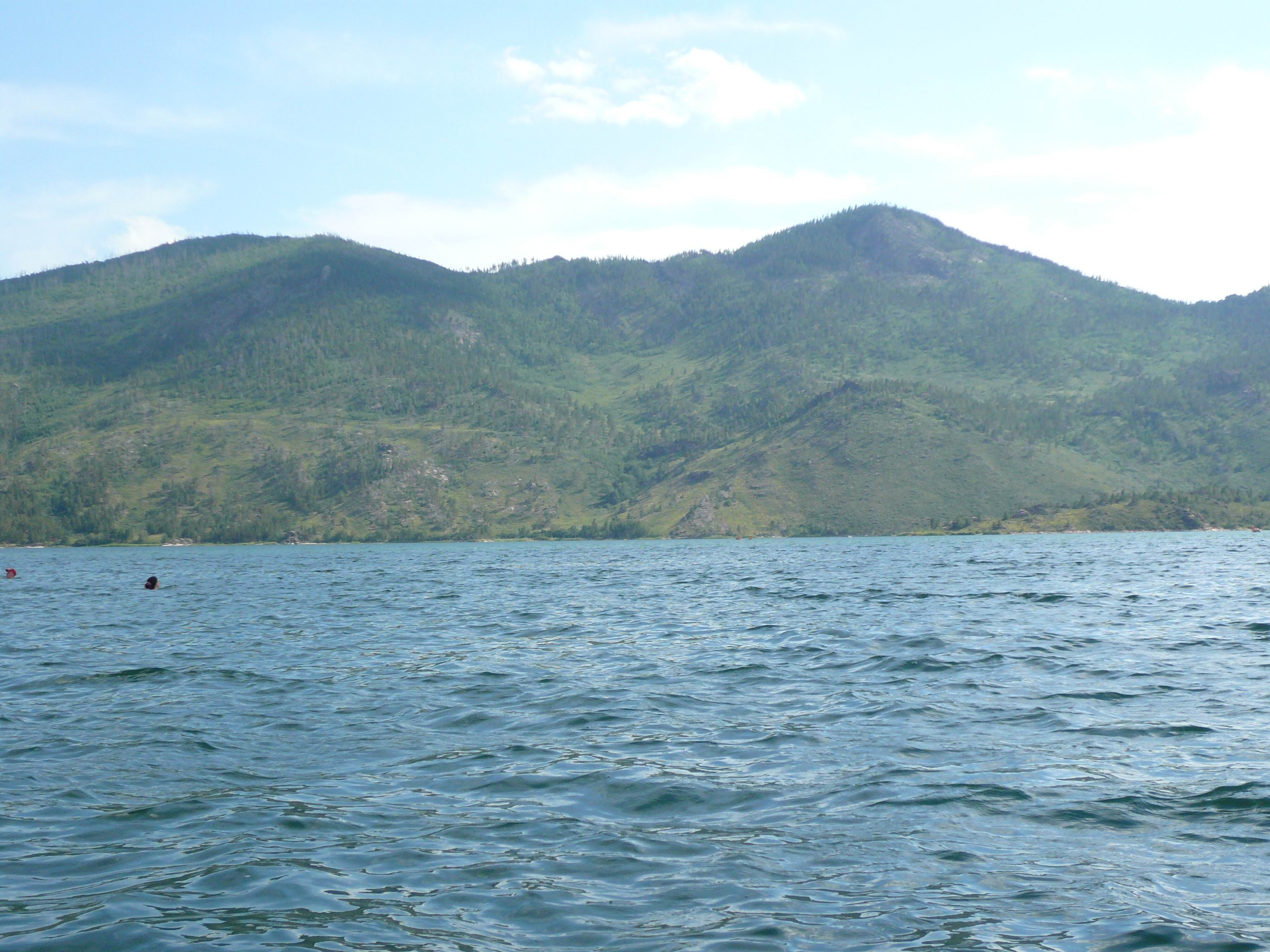
Lake Jasybay

The second-largest lake is Jasybay, named in honour of the Kazakh mythic hero, Jasybay. It lies in a vale between two mountain ridges.

Toraygir is the third-largest and highest-altitude lake. This lake was named in honour of the Kazakh poet Sultanmahmut Toraygirov, who spent his childhood in this region.

Byrzhankol is the smallest lake of the four, and gets its name from the Kazakh words byr ("one"), zhan ("soul"), and kol ("lake"), translating altogether to "lake of one soul".

== Flora ==
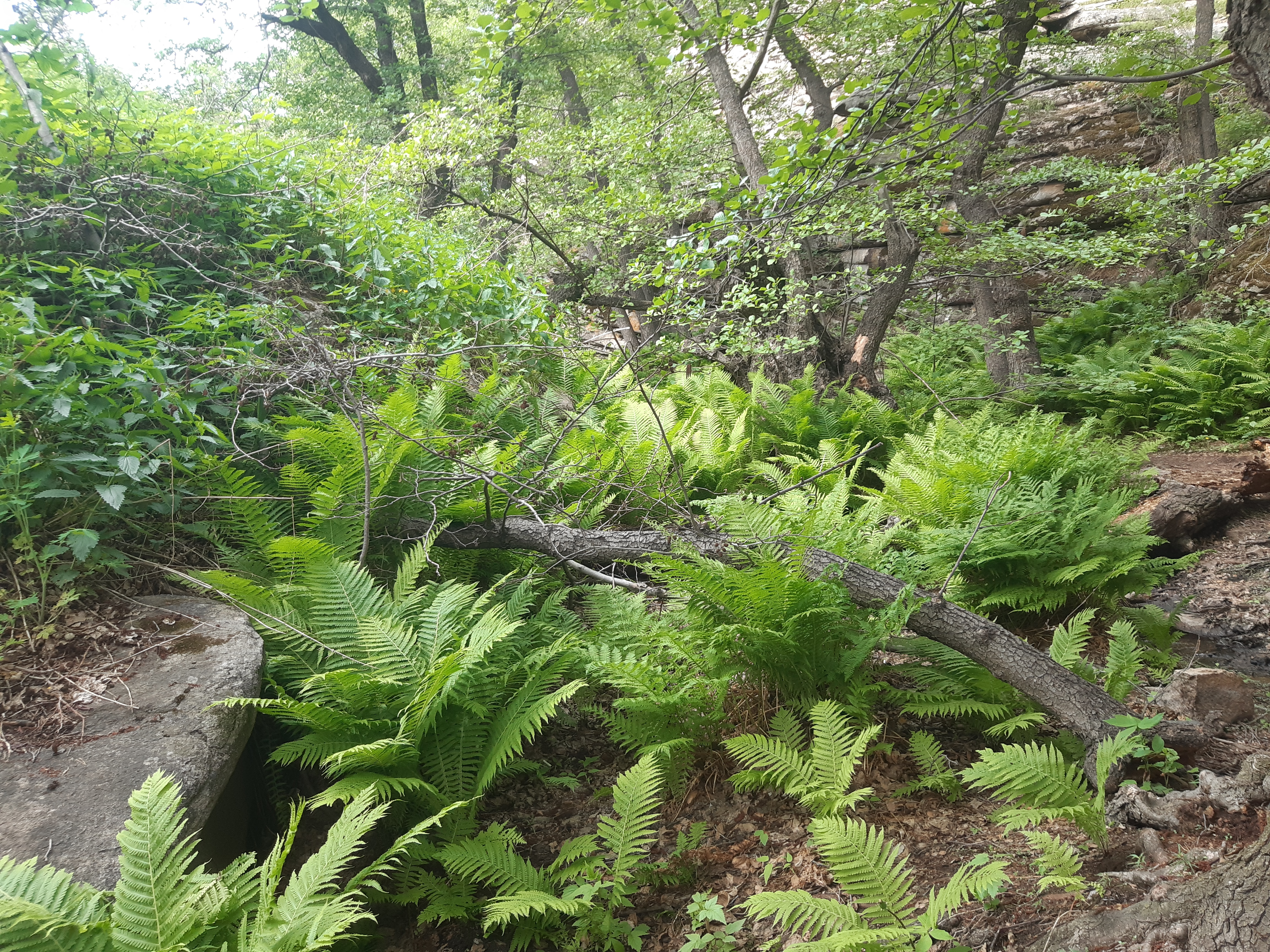
Ferns and other vegetation

Four kinds of vegetation can be found in the park: forest, forest-steppe, steppe, and meadow.

The park is botanically diverse and supports approximately 460 plant species, including the Bayanaul pine and the black alder. The Bayanaul pine is considered unique in that it grows primarily on rocks. Scenes of pine vegetation juxtaposed with bare rock are considered a main tourist draw to the park.

The variety of vegetation in the park is particularly surprising considering that it is located in a semi-desert steppe. Along with birches, pines, alders, and aspens, many bushes and shrubs occur in the park, including berry-bearing varieties such as raspberries, rose hips, currants, and hawthorns. Wild strawberries grow in the meadows, and mushrooms grow in the forests. Up to 50 species of relict plant species can be found in the park, including black alder and rock currant.

== Fauna ==
Around 50 species of birds and 40 species of mammals, including the argali, roe deer, European badger, and squirrel, inhabit the park.

Among the birds found in the park are cranes, swans, herons, and bustards. Birds of prey include eagles, kestrels, and kites.

== Climate ==
The national park falls under the humid continental climate, warm summer Köppen climate classification (Dfb). It is characterized by large seasonal temperature variations, experiencing warm summers (at least four months averaging over 10 °C and no month averaging over 22 °C, and cold winters (the average January temperature is −13.7 °C, with an average minimum of −17.8 °C). The average annual temperature in the park is 3.2 °C.

The average July temperature is 14.6 °C, with an average maximum reaching 32.6 °C. The average frost-free period is 140 days. Annual precipitation is 340 mm, with some years varying from 190 to 494 mm. The average wind speed in Bayanaul is 2.9 m/s.

Bayanaul does not usually experience the strong winds and dust storms common in the steppe regions of Pavlodar Province. It lies in the Kazakh Steppe ecoregion.

== Recreation ==
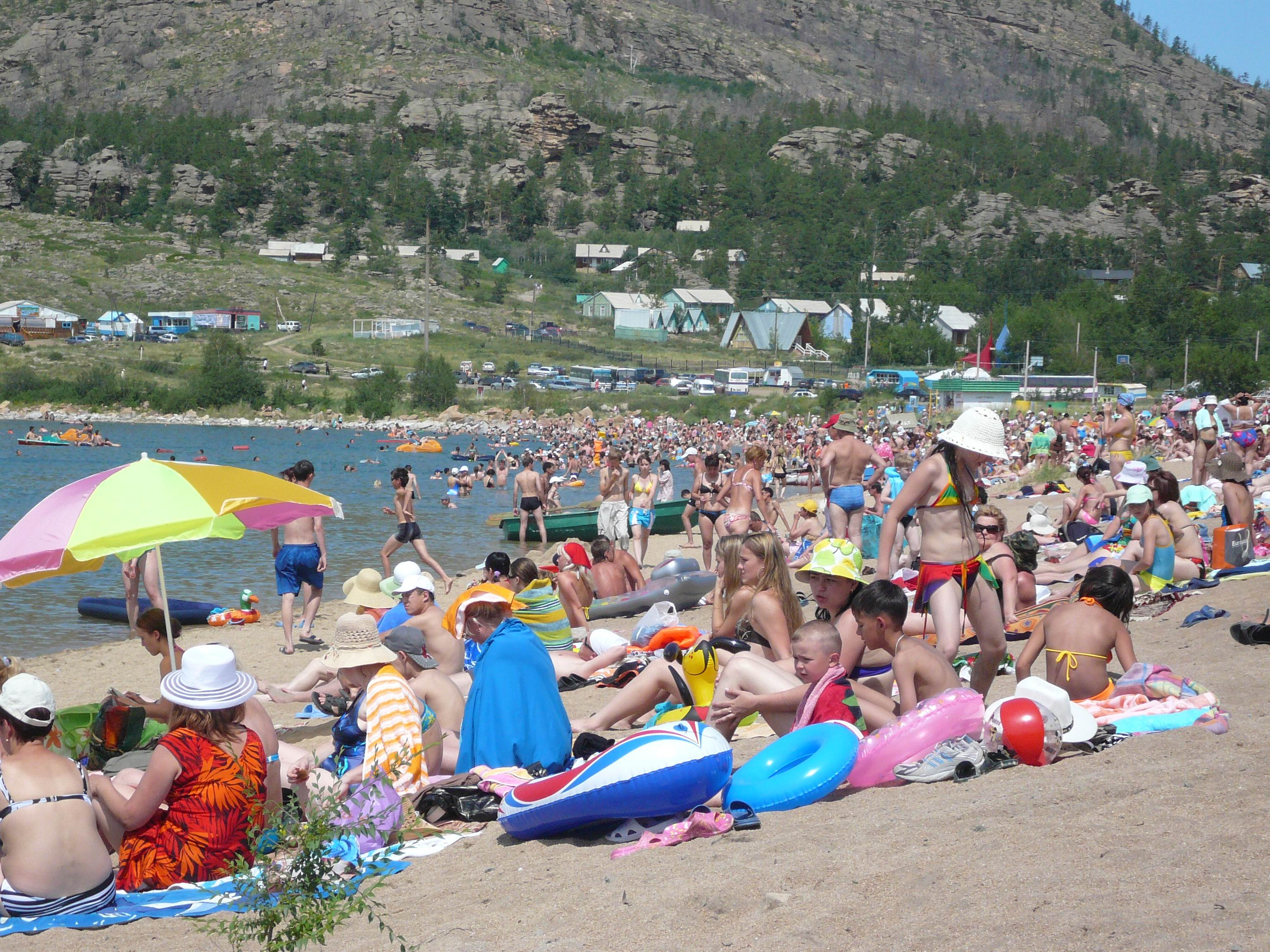
Beach on Lake Jasybay

The park has sanatoriums and recreational areas; however, most of these areas have poor infrastructure and lack indoor plumbing.

Several recreational activities are offered in the park, including swimming, hiking, rock climbing, and mountain biking. Guided tours are offered in many areas of the park to the main attractions of the park, including the "holy cave", the "stone head", the "masculine dignity" rock, and others. Catamaran, rowboat, and motorboat rentals are offered on the shores of Lake Jasybay.

In the summer of 1993, the first National Jamboree of the Organization of the Scout Movement of Kazakhstan, dubbed "Jasybay's Arrow", was held at the national park.

== Landmarks ==
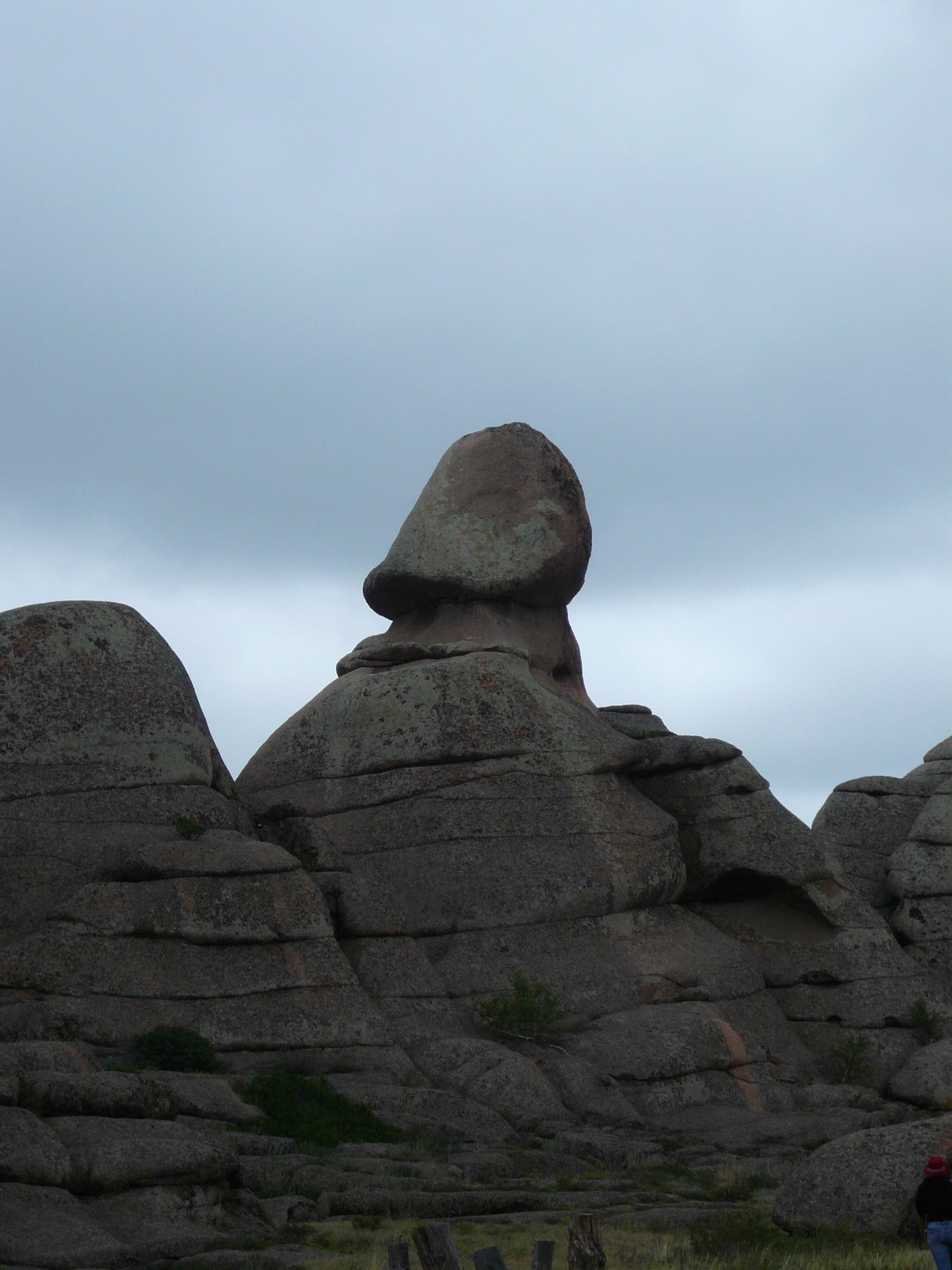
"Masculine dignity" rock

The national park contains large rock formations that have taken on bizarre shapes due to centuries of environmental erosion and often resemble animals, people, and other objects, such as a truck coming down a mountain. Among these is the "Baba-Yaga" rock, which, when viewed from a certain angle, resembles the head of a bald, toothless old woman with a treacherous grin, much like Baba-Yaga from Slavic mythology. Another popular attraction in the park is a rock dubbed "masculine dignity" because it resembles the head of a penis. Other rock forms in the park take on the likenesses of a camel, the heads of a mammoth and a gorilla, a flying saucer, a dinosaur, a dove, a horse head, and many others.

Another local attraction is the "holy cave". According to superstition, if someone enters the cave, places their palm on the wall, makes a wish, and then leaves without turning their head around to face the exit, their wish will come true. Another superstition posits that the cave helps infertile parents conceive; for this reason, the cave is the site of a fertility ritual. The cave is located at a high altitude and requires a kilometre-long walk to reach. In recent years, a wooden staircase has been built for the last section of the route.

== Gallery ==
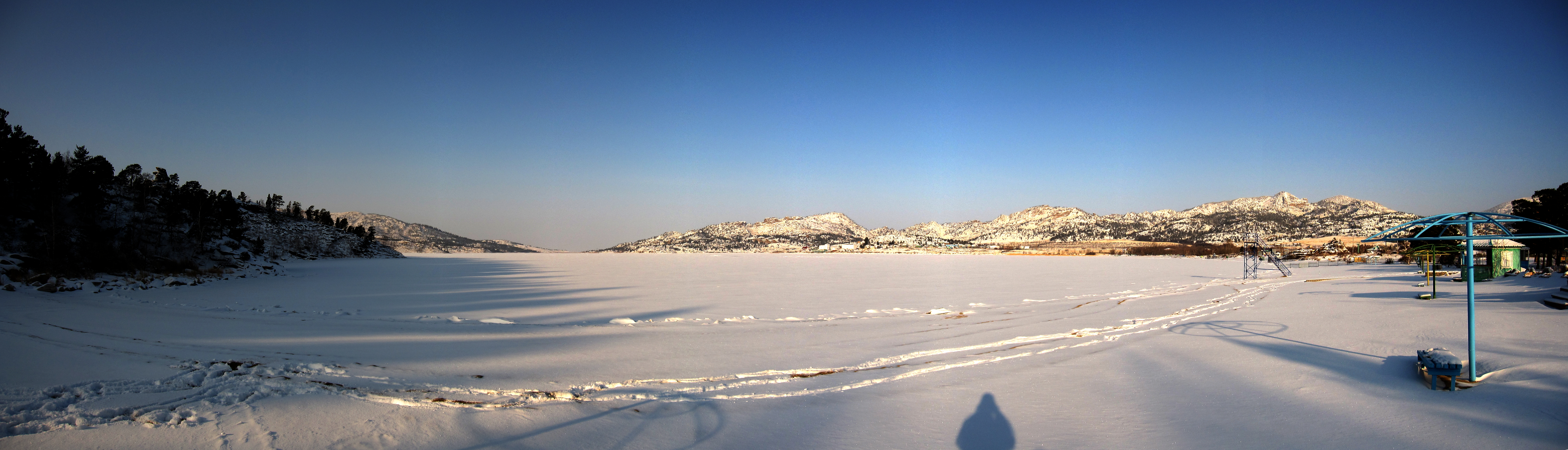
Scenery in winter

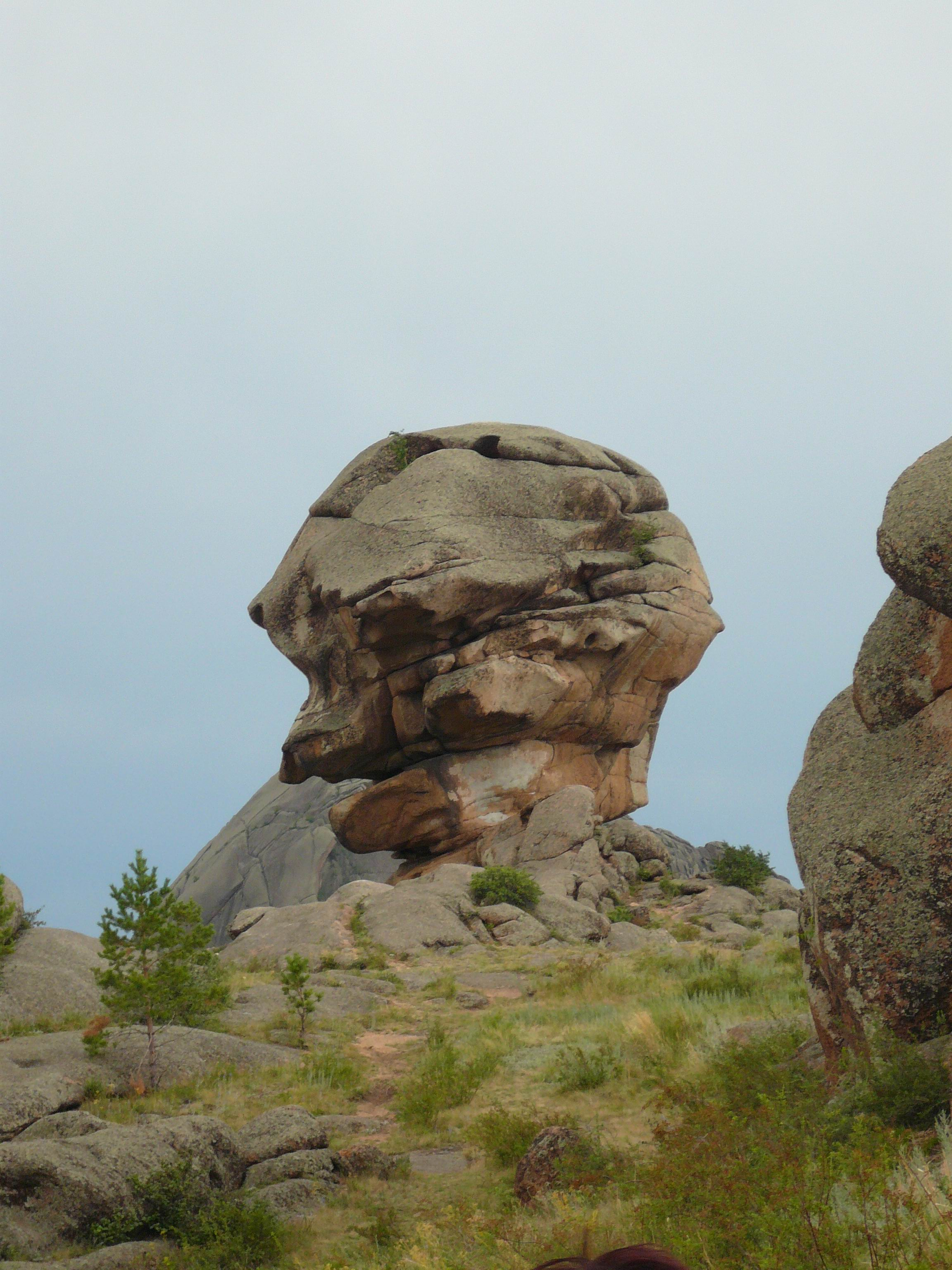
"Baba-Yaga" rock

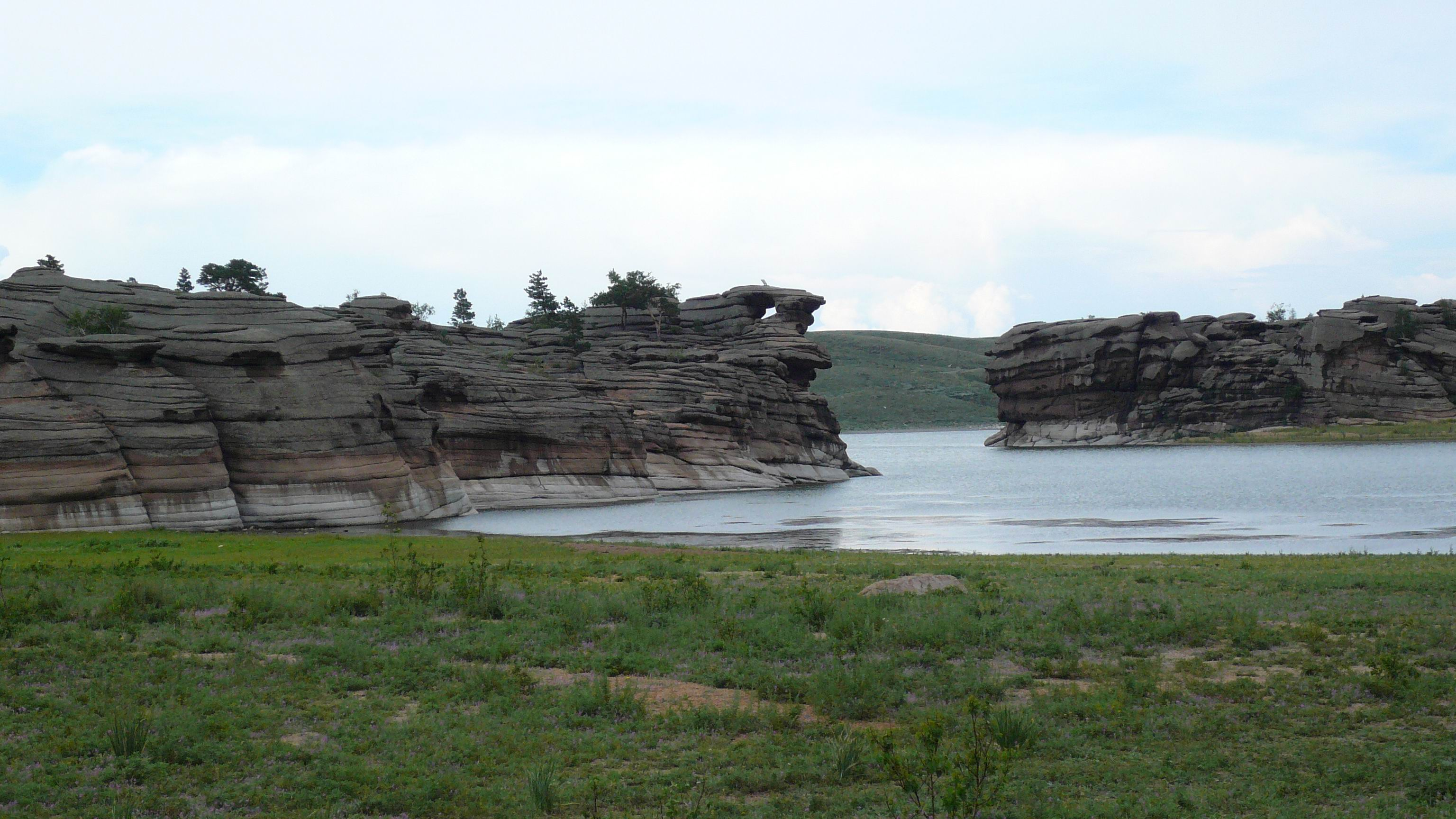
Island of Love (right) on Lake Toraygir

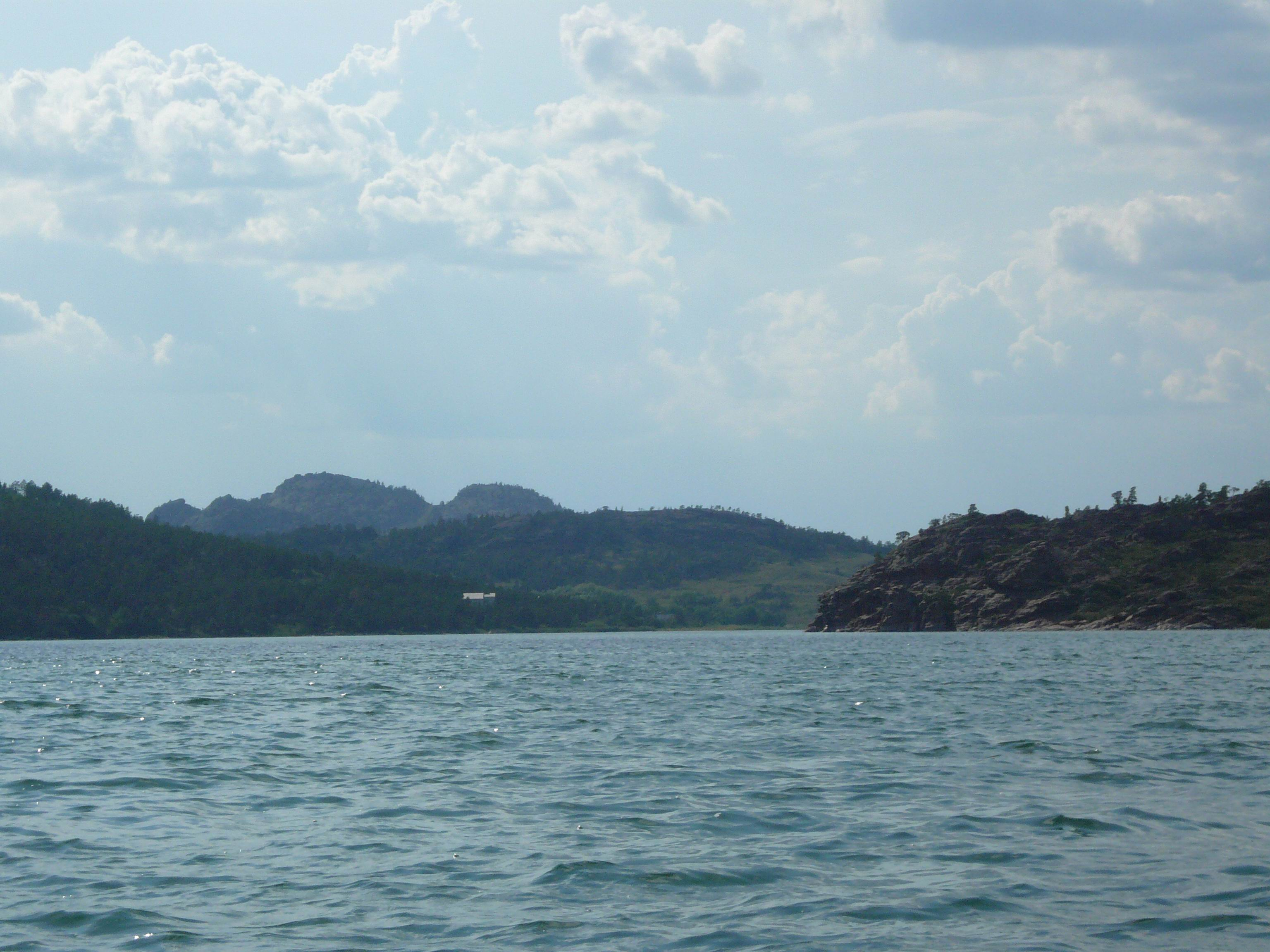
Lake Toraygir

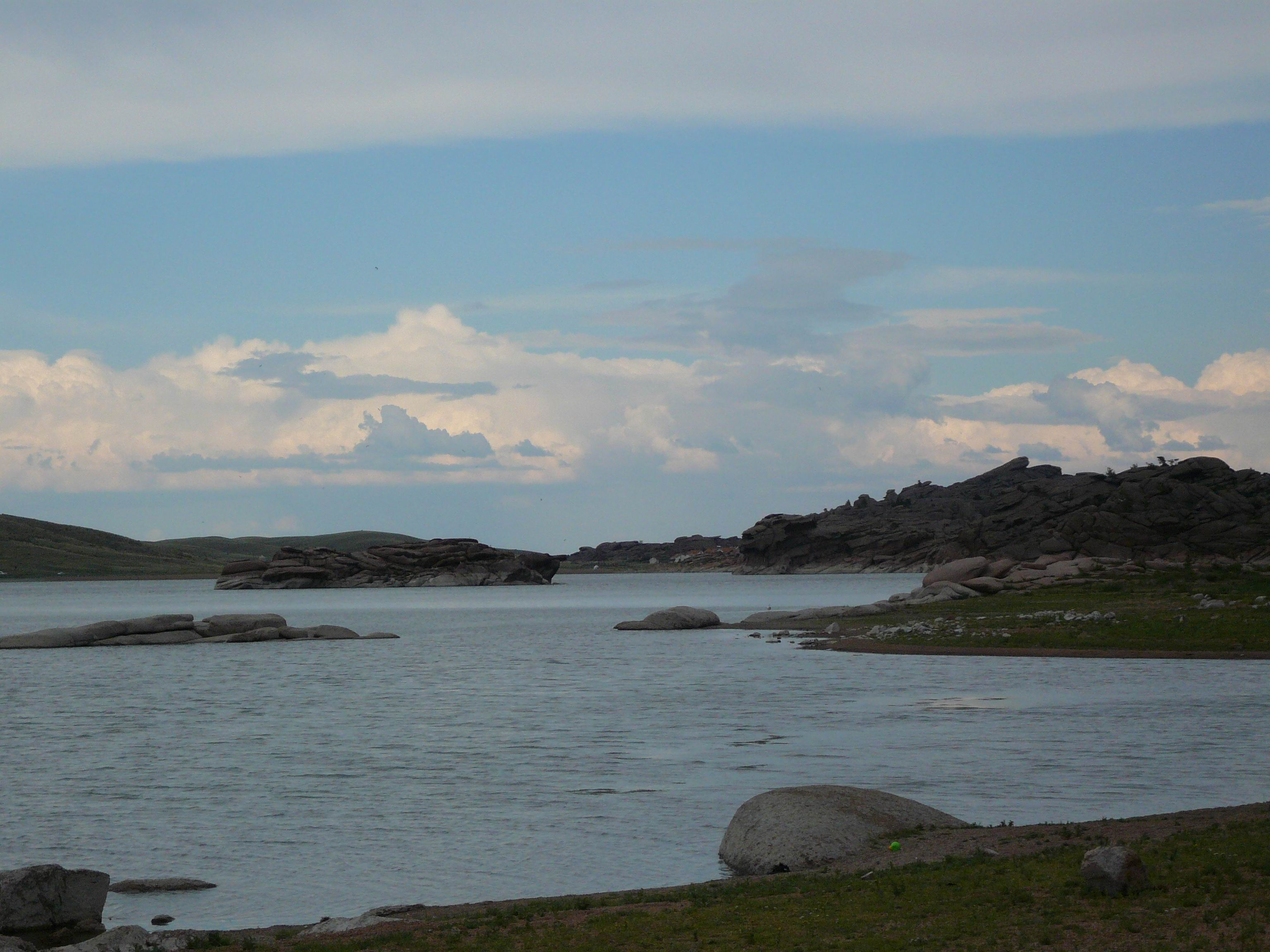
Lake Toraygir

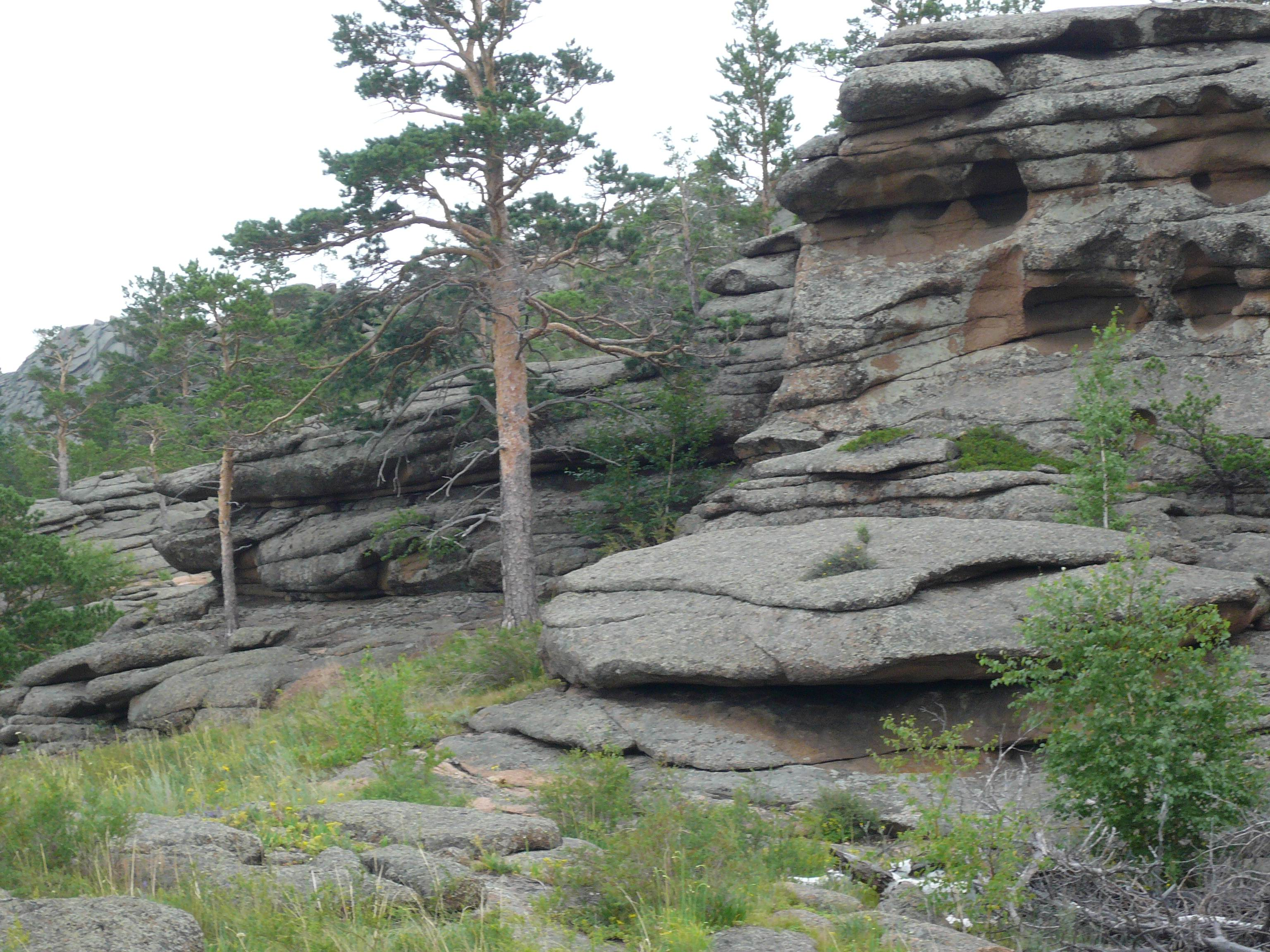
Characteristic landscape of the park

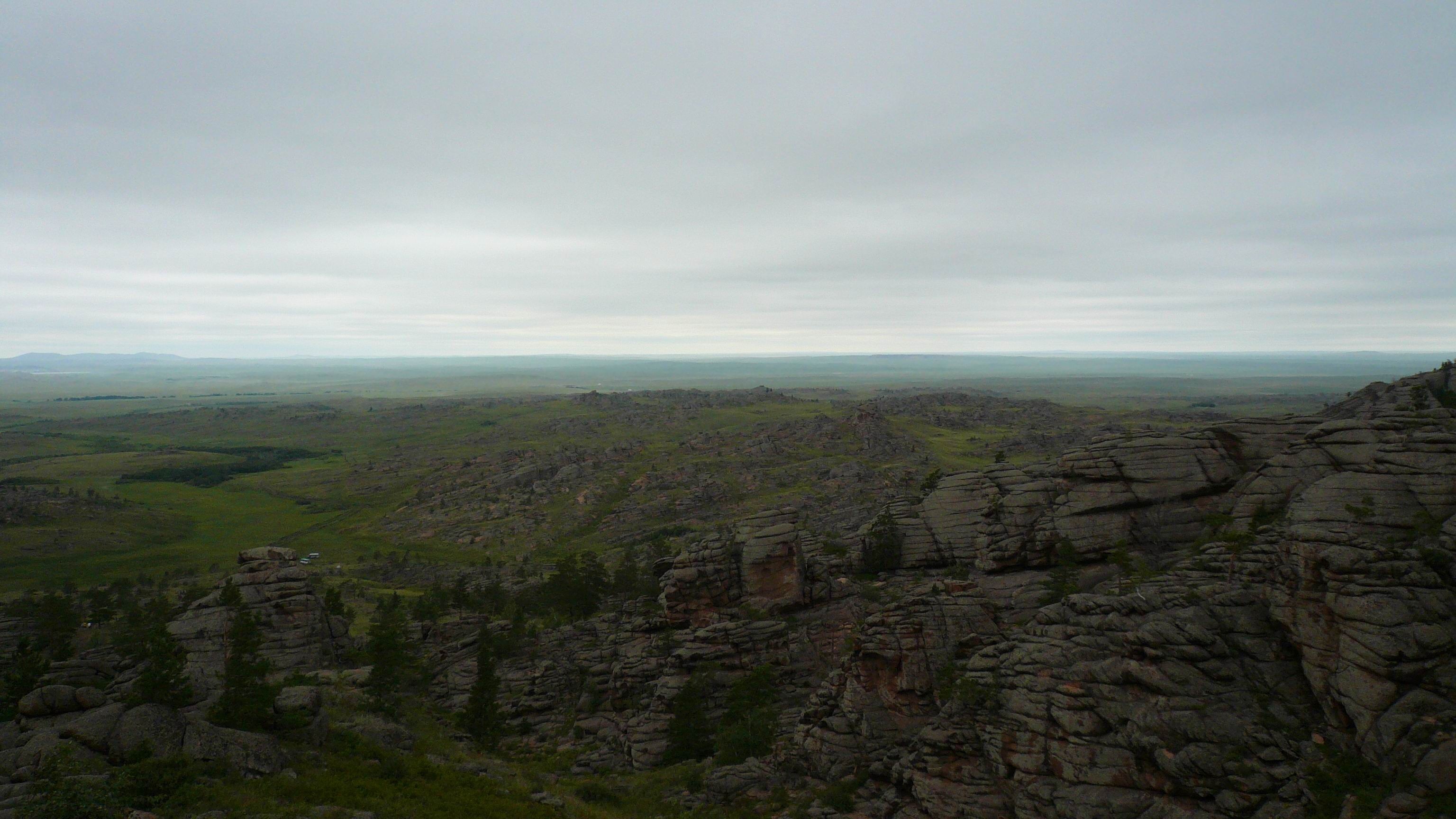
Another view of Bayanaul

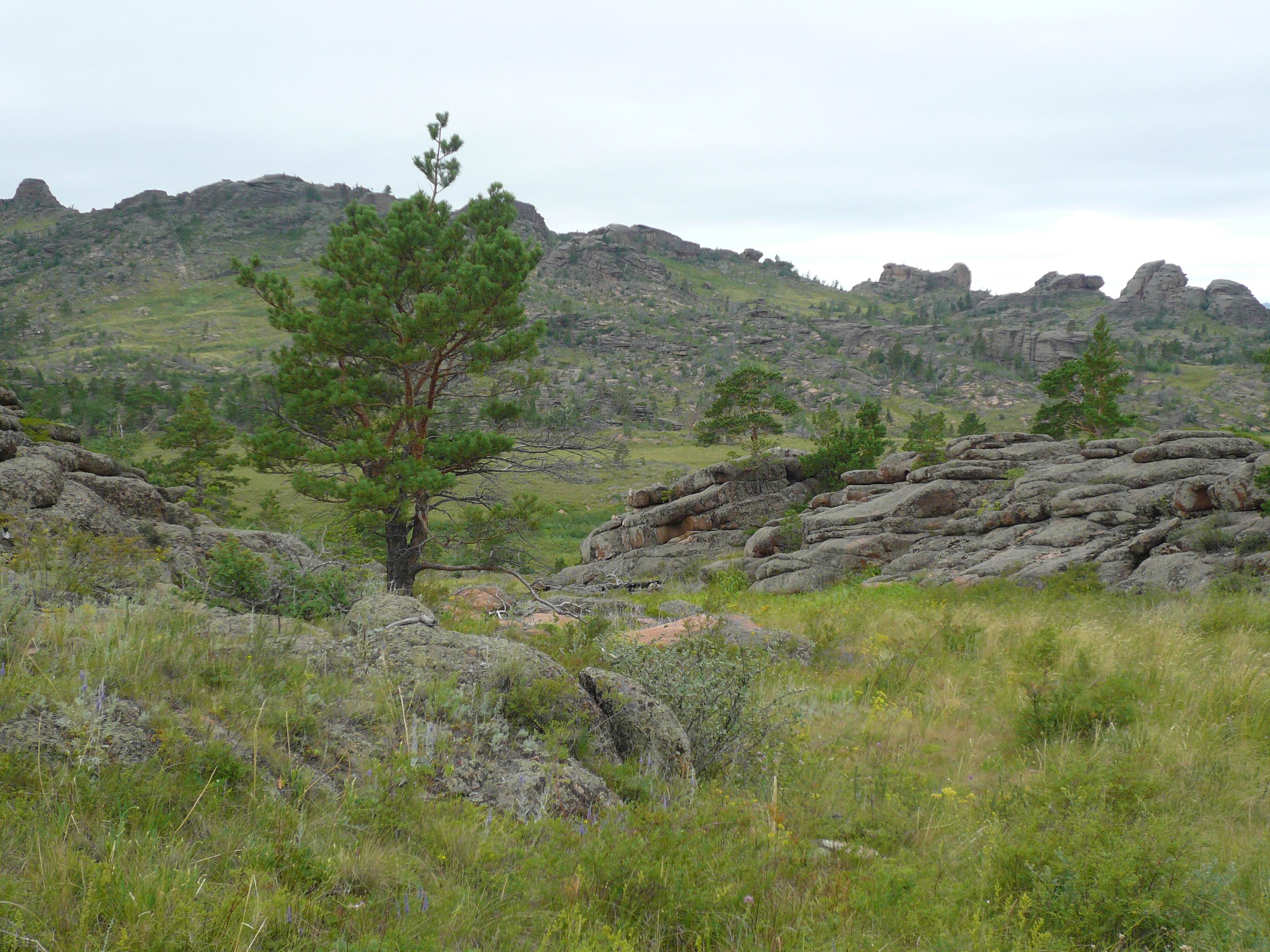
Bayanaul landscape

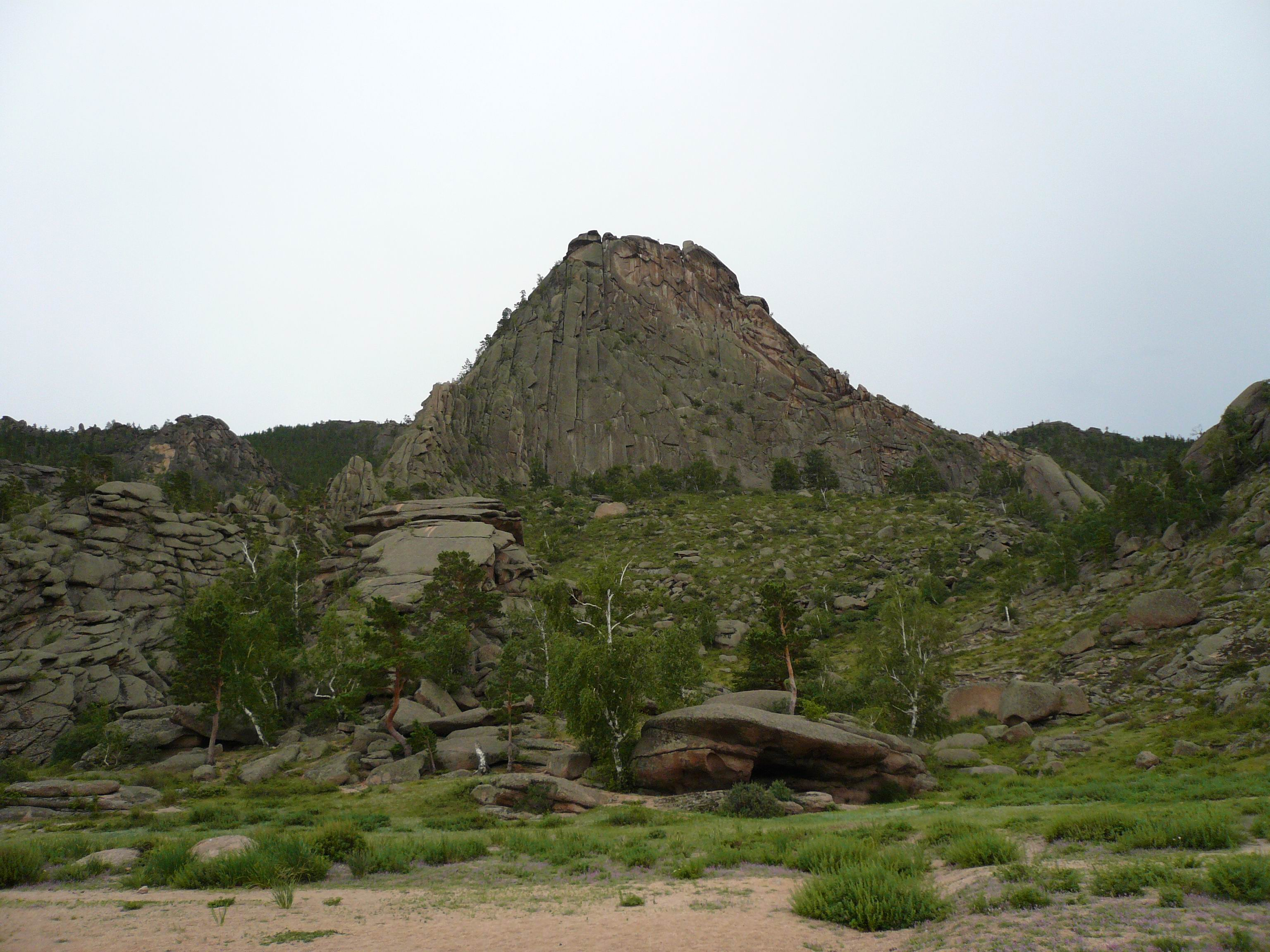
Peak of Courage near Lake Toraygir
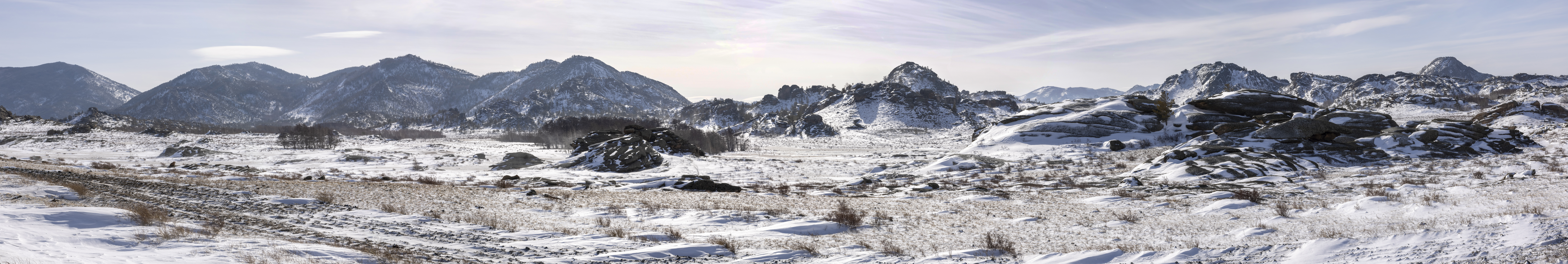
Panorama of snowy mountains in the park
