= Sultanmahmut Toraygirov =

Sultanmakhmut Toraygirov
- Born: October 29, 1893; Kyzyltu district of present day Akmola Province
- Died: May 21, 1920
- Occupation(s): Poet, Philosopher

Sultanmakhmut Toraygirov (Kazakh: Сұлтанмахмұт Торайғыров, Sūltanmahmūt Toraiğyrov; 29 October 1893 – 21 May 1920) was a prominent Kazakh writer and poet. He was born in Kyzyltu (near the city of Kokshetau) but moved to Bayanaul in the province of Pavlodar at the age of four. Toraygirov wrote his first poems when only 13 years old. From 1913 on, he was the sub-editor for the first Kazakh journal Aikap. In 1914 and 1915 he worked as a teacher in Bayanaul. In 1916 Toraygirov moved to Tomsk in Russia, but the next year the February Revolution made him return to Semey, in Kazakhstan. During this time he developed his style and wrote prolifically.

Toraygirov released several poem collections and his novel Beauty Kamar, released posthumously in 1933, was one of the first Kazakh language novels. He was very active politically, advocating both Kazakh national interests and the new Soviet ideals. Toraygirov died in 1920 at the age of 26.

The state university in Pavlodar and lake Toraigyr are named after Toraygirov.

== Notable works ==
- Poem Life in Confusion published in 1922
- Poem Poor man (Russian: "Бедняк") published in 1922
- Novel Beauty Kamar (Russian: "Красавица Камар") published in 1933

== Poems ==
- What is the purpose of study? (Russian: "Что за цель в учении?")
- Religion (Russian: "Религия")
- Education (Russian: "Учение")
- Blind Monk (Russian: "Слепой монах")
- Sarybas (Kazakh: "Сарыбас") (1913–1914)
- Fate (Russian: "Судьба")
- Ayt (Kazakh: "Айт")
- Summer Camp(Russian: "На кочевку")
- Poverty (Russian: "Бедность")
- Belief in God (Russian: "Вера в бога")
- Speckled Khoja (Russian: "Рябой ходжа")
