= Jasybay =

Jasybay (Russian: Джасыбай, alternately Zhasybay) was a Kazakh mythic hero, a warrior who fought the Dzungarian invasion of the 16th and 17th centuries. Jasybay himself was slain but the local tribes were successful in repelling that round of invasions. Eventually protection was sought from the Russian Czar by the Middle Juz of Kazakh people against these repeated invasions.

Jasybay is said to be buried in a pass between Lake Jasybay and Lake Sabyndykul, so that his spirit can guard the entire Bayanaul territory.
