= Terengkol District =

Coordinates: 53°13′12″N 76°23′24″E

Terengkol
- District
- Тереңкөл ауданы
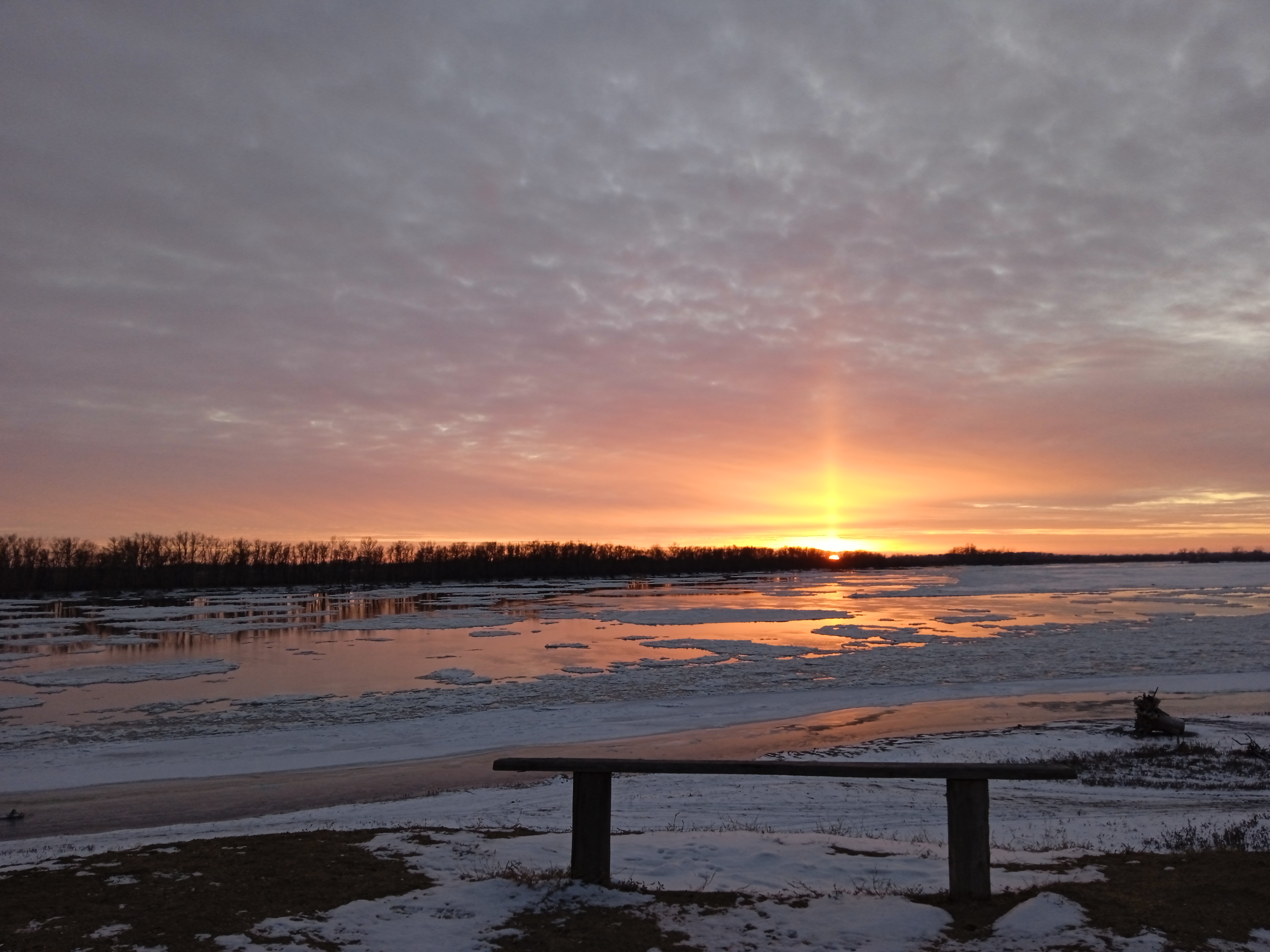
- Panorama of the district

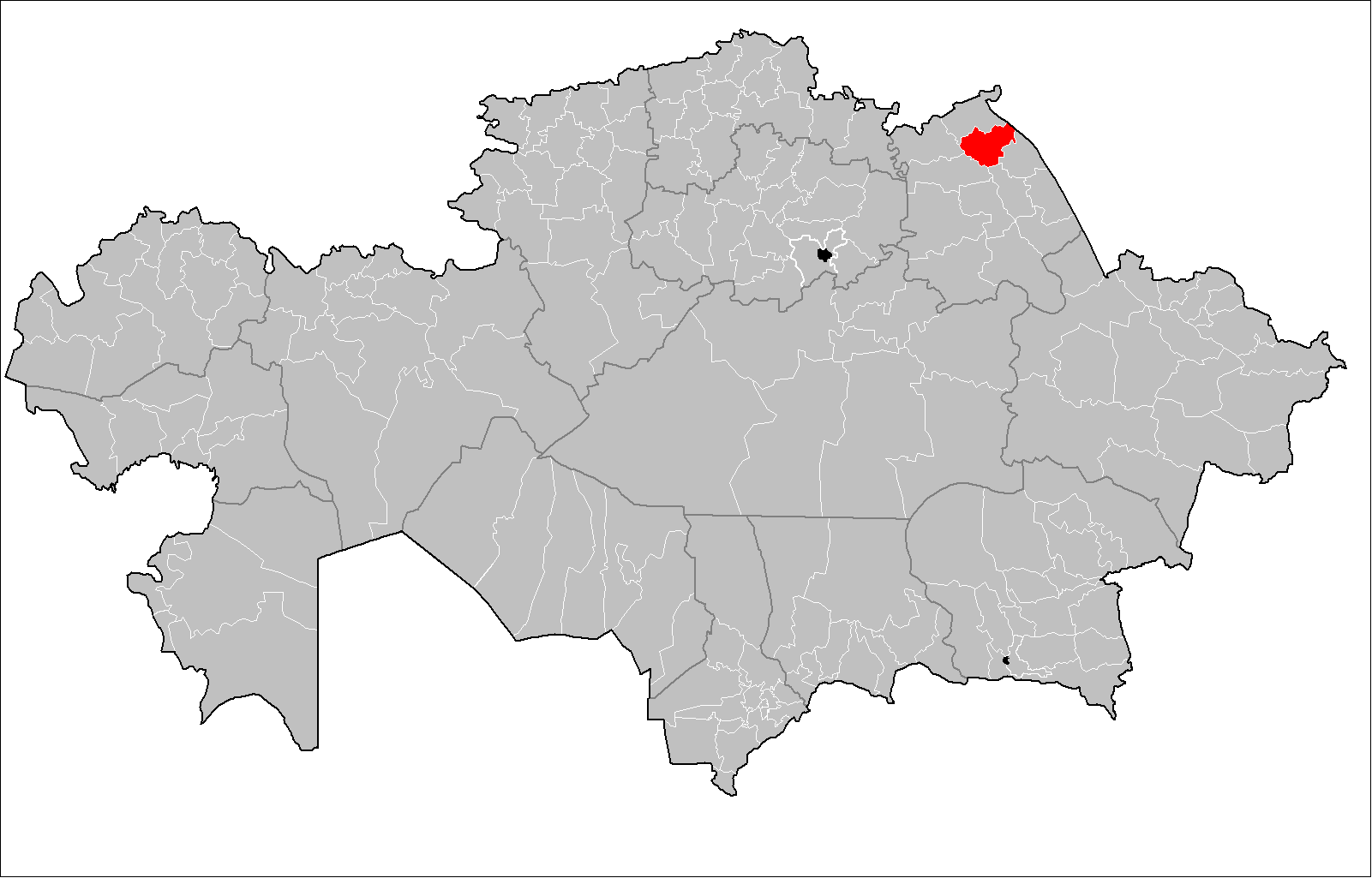
- Country: Kazakhstan
- Region: Pavlodar Region
- Administrative center: Terengkol
- Founded: 1963

Government
  - Akim: Mangutov Azamat Toktamysovich

Area
  - Total: 2,600 sq mi (6,800 km^{2})

Population (2013)
  - Total: 21,302
- Time zone: UTC+6 (East)

Terengkol District (Kazakh: Тереңкөл ауданы, romanized: Tereñköl audany), formerly known as Kashyr District until 2018, is a district of Pavlodar Region in northern Kazakhstan. The administrative center of the district is Terengkol village. Population: 21,302 (2013 estimate); 22,208 (2009 census results); 31,666 (1999 census results).

== Geography ==
The Irtysh River flows across the district. The M38 highway Pavlodar — Omsk passes across it.
