= Terengkol =

Terengkol Тереңкөл
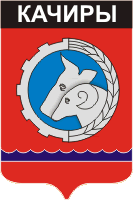
- Coat of arms

- Location in Kazakhstan
- Coordinates: 53°03′51″N 76°06′15″E
- Country: Kazakhstan
- Region: Pavlodar Region
- District: Terengkol District
- Rural District: Terengkol Rural District
- Foundation of Kashyr: 1790

Population (2023)
  - Total: 8,187
- Time zone: UTC+6
- Postcode: 140600

Terengkol (Kazakh: Тереңкөл [tʲerʲeŋkɵ́l]; Russian: Теренколь), formerly known as Kashyr until 2008, is a village in Pavlodar Region, Kazakhstan. It is the capital of Terengkol District and the administrative center of the Terengkol Rural District (KATO code — 554830100). Population: 7,355 (2009 census results); 8,585 (1999 census results).

== History ==
The village of Kashiry was founded around 1790. In 1828 it was mentioned as a settlement of Cossack troops, then as a Cossack village. In 1907 a wooden church in honor of the Three Saints was consecrated at Kashirskoye. The building was destroyed by the time of the Kazakh SSR. The residents were able to restore their parish only in 1993. In 1934, Kashyr became a regional center.

== Geography ==
Terengkol is located on the right bank of the Irtysh River, 112 kilometers (70 mi) to the north of Pavlodar, the regional capital. The M38 highway Pavlodar — Omsk passes by the eastern part of the village.
