= Lake Jasybay =

Lake in Pavlodar Region, Kazakhstan

Jasybay
- Жасыбай
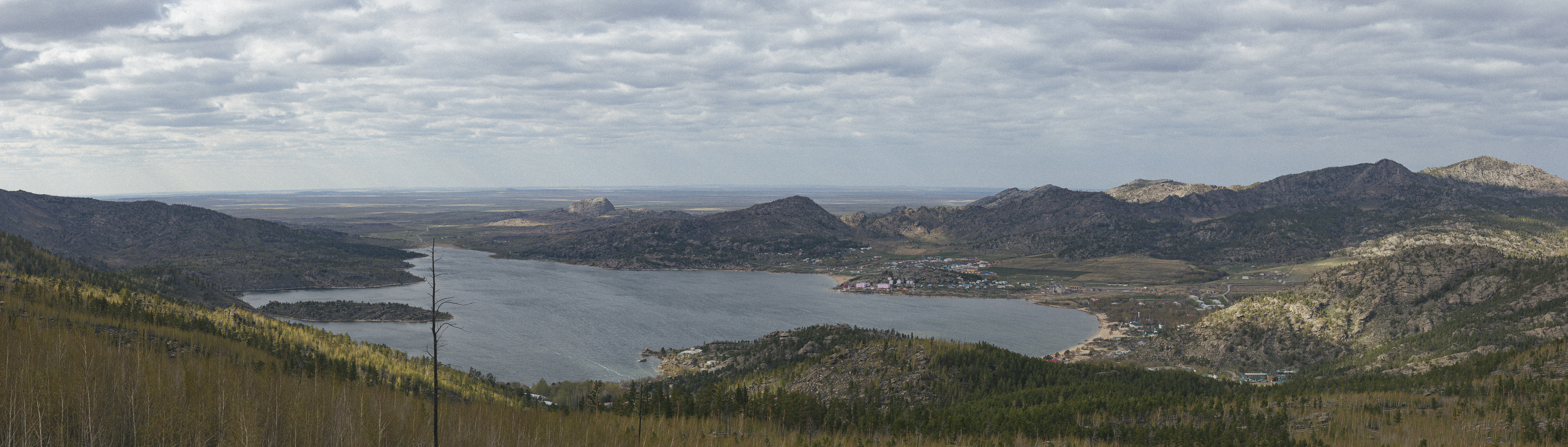
- Jasybay lake from above

- Location of Lake Jasybay in Kazakhstan.
- Location: Bayanaul Range, Kazakh Uplands
- Coordinates: 50.826472°N 75.569889°E
- Basin countries: Kazakhstan
- Max. length: 3.5 kilometers (2.2 mi)
- Max. width: 2.4 kilometers (1.5 mi)
- Surface area: 4 square kilometers (1.5 sq mi)
- Max. depth: 14.7 meters (48 ft)
- Surface elevation: 395 meters (1,296 ft)

Lake Jasybay or Zhasybai (Kazakh: Жасыбай) is a lake in the Bayanaul Range, south-eastern Pavlodar Region, Kazakhstan.

It is a popular tourist destination for residents of central and northern Kazakhstan because of its clear water and scenic views from its beaches. The lake was formerly known as Shoyynkol (Шойынколь), but it was renamed after Jasybay, a mythic Kazakh hero who was killed in 1752 on its shore during a battle against invaders.

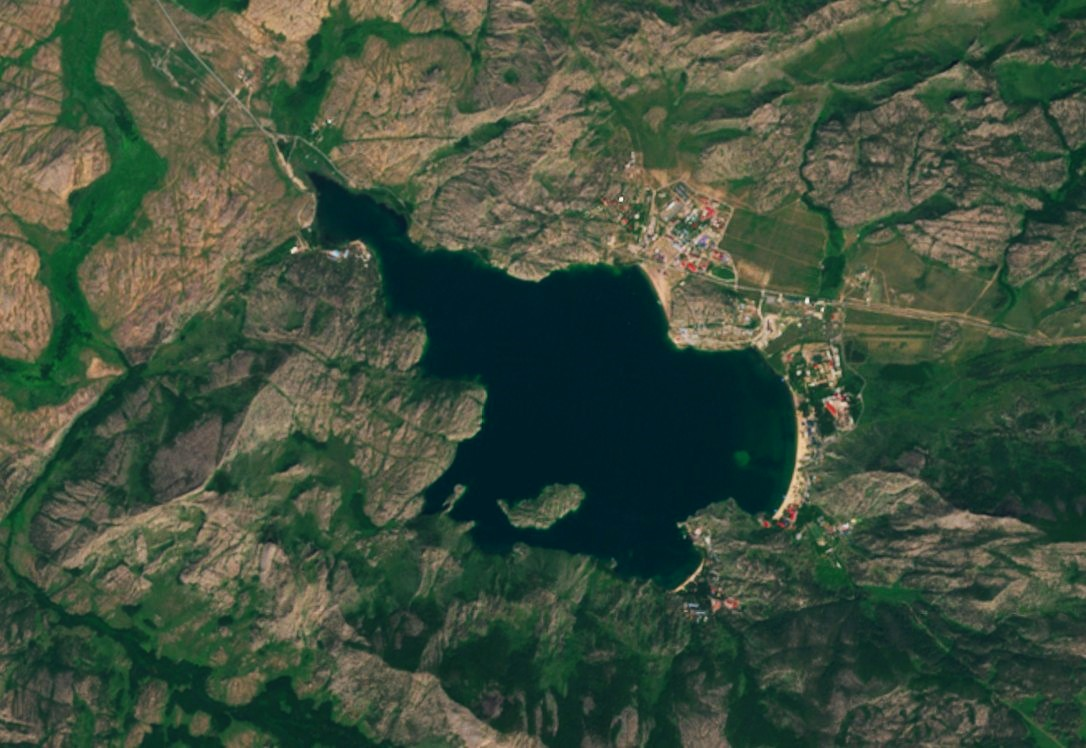
Lake Jasybay as seen from space (Sentinel-2 L1C data, modified)

== Geography ==
The lake is located 6 kilometers (3.7 mi) south of Bayanaul, the administrative center of the district, and 230 kilometers (140 mi) southwest of Pavlodar, the regional capital. It is 3.5 kilometers (2.2 mi) long and 2.4 kilometers (1.5 mi) wide and lies surrounded by the mountains of the range, within the Bayanaul National Park area.
