= Akbet =

Mountain in Kazakhstan

- Ақбет
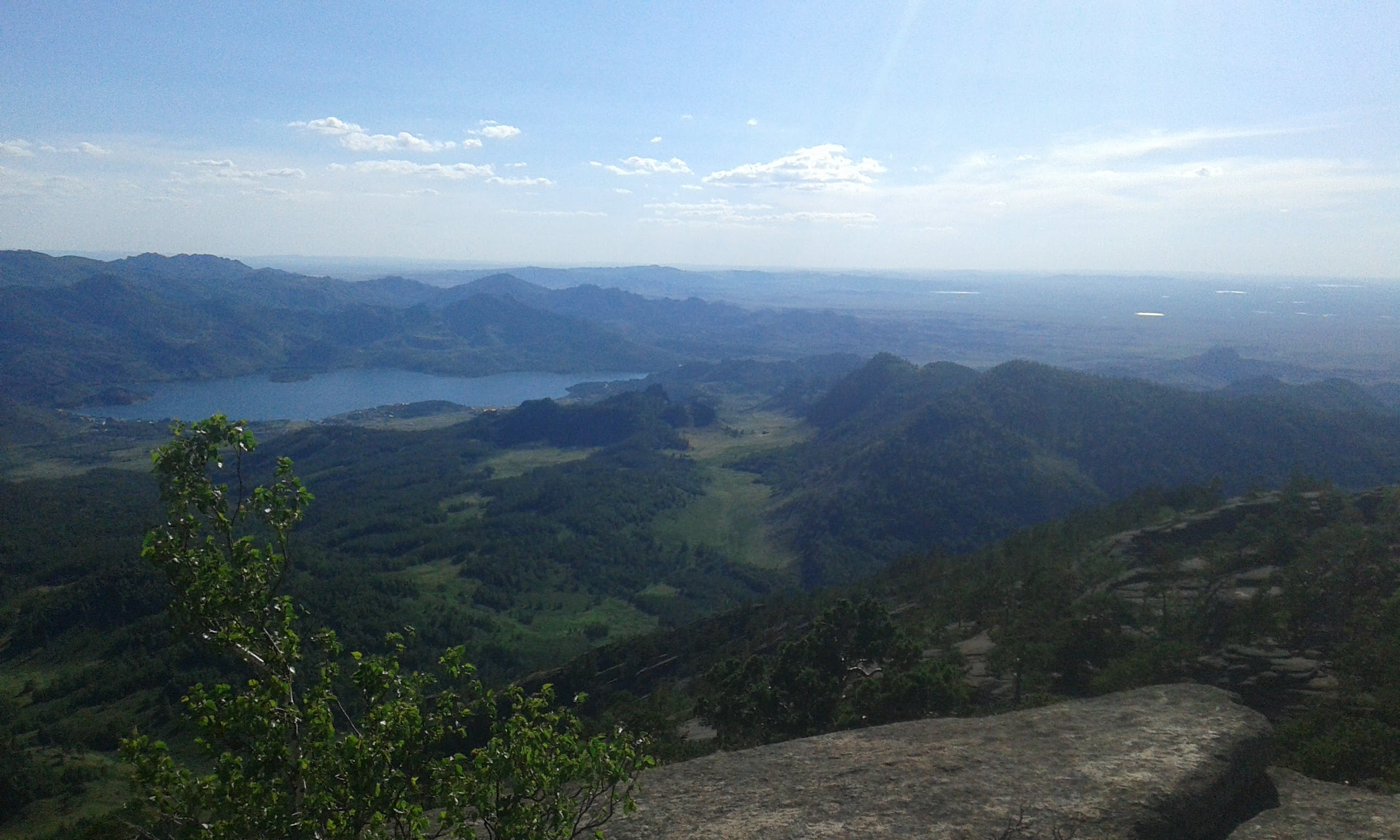
- View from the summit towards the west

Highest point
- Elevation: 1,022 m (3,353 ft)
- Coordinates: 50°50′36″N 75°39′46″E

Geography
- Location within Kazakhstan
- Country: Kazakhstan
- Region: Pavlodar Region
- District: Bayanaul District
- Parent range: Bayanaul Range; Kazakh Uplands

Climbing
- Easiest route: from Bayanaul

Akbet (Kazakh: Ақбет) is a mountain in Bayanaul District, Pavlodar Region, Kazakhstan.

Akbet is located about 8 kilometres (5 mi) to the NNW of Bayanaul. According to local folklore, the mountain is named after a Kazakh girl who killed herself there after having been given in marriage to a man she did not love.

== Geography ==
Akbet rises in the Bayanaul Range, a subrange of the Kazakh Uplands (Saryarka). The mountain has generally gentle slopes, but rocky and strongly dissected on the western side, where there is a gorge with springs. With an elevation 1,022 metres (3,353 ft), it is the highest mountain in the Bayanaul Range, as well as the highest point of Pavlodar Region.

Geologically the peak is made up of Silurian and Devonian granite, syenite, porphyry and shale.

== See also ==
- Geography of Kazakhstan
