= Bayanaul Range =

Mountain range in Kazakhstan

- Баянауыл тауы
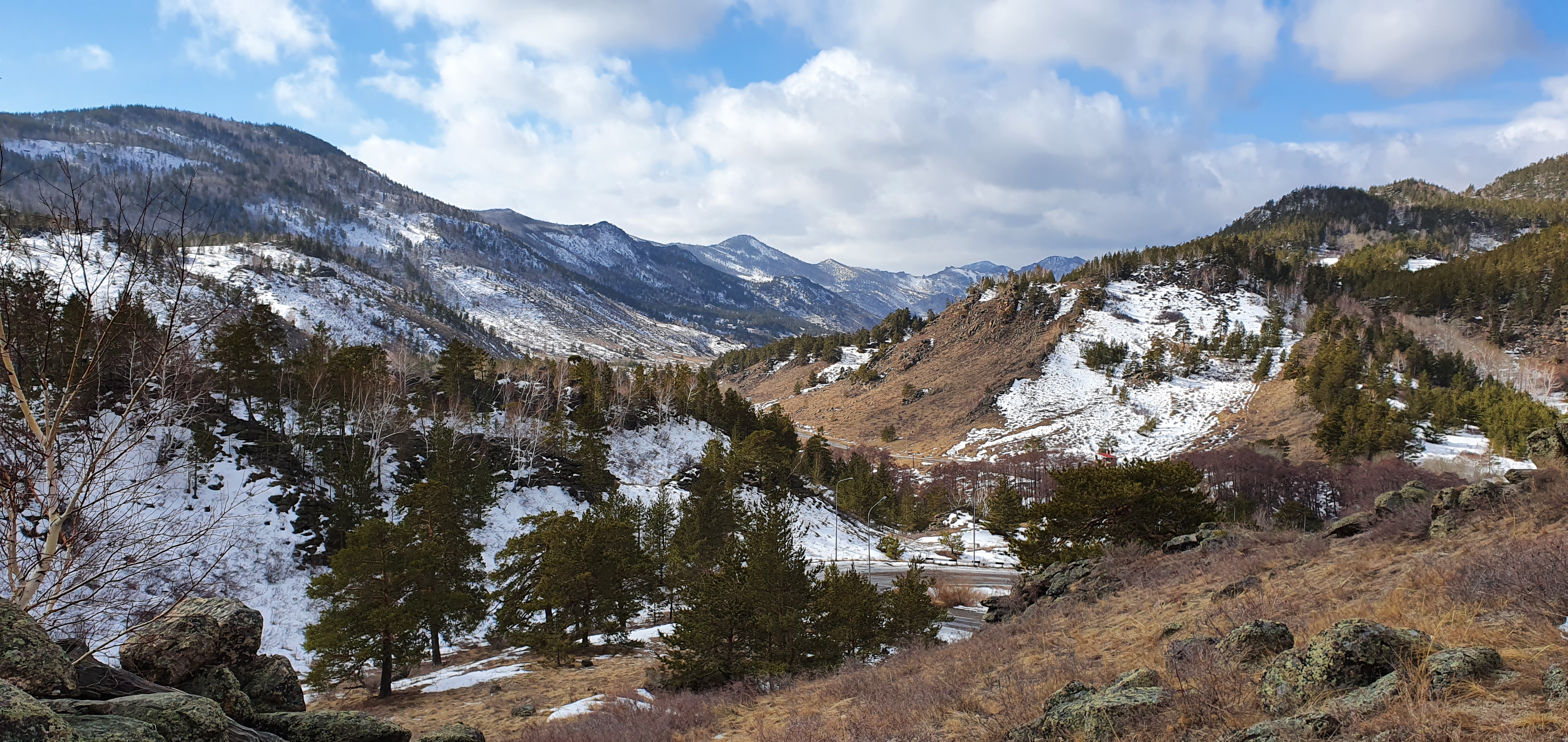
- Landscape of the range

Highest point
- Peak: Akbet
- Elevation: 1,022 m (3,353 ft)
- Coordinates: 50°50′36″N 75°39′46″E

Dimensions
- Length: 40 km (25 mi) E / W
- Width: 20 km (12 mi) N / S

Geography
- Location within Kazakhstan
- Location: Bayanaul District; Pavlodar Region, Kazakhstan
- Range coordinates: 50°48′N 75°37′E
- Parent range: Kazakh Uplands

Geology
- Orogeny: Alpine orogeny
- Rock age(s): Silurian and Devonian
- Rock type: Granite, quartzite, porphyritic rock

Climbing
- Easiest route: From Bayanaul

Bayanaul Range (Kazakh: Баянауыл тауы, romanized: Baianauyl tauy; Russian: Баянаульские горы) is a mountain range in Bayanaul District, Pavlodar Region, Kazakhstan.

Bayanaul, the administrative center of Bayanaul District, lies at the feet of the eastern slopes of the mountains. A large sector of the range is part of the Bayanaul National Park, a 68,453-hectare (169,150-acre) protected area established in 1985.

== Geography ==
The Bayanaul Range is one of the subranges of the Kazakh Upland system (Saryarka). It rises in the northeastern sector of the highlands. The Bayanaul stretches from east to west for about 40 kilometers (25 mi) with mountaintops averaging between 600 meters (2,000 ft) and 1,000 meters (3,300 ft). The highest point is Akbet, a 1,026 meters (3,366 ft) high summit. The uppermost levels of the mountains are generally rocky and their slopes are deeply dissected by valleys and ravines. No major rivers have their sources in the range. Most flow into the surrounding steppe, their waters ending up in distant salt lakes or dispersed in the sands.

The main lakes in the range are Sabyndykol, the largest one, as well as Zhasybai, Toraigyr and Byrzhankol, the latter located in the western part of the range. There are also numerous rock formations within the mountain area.

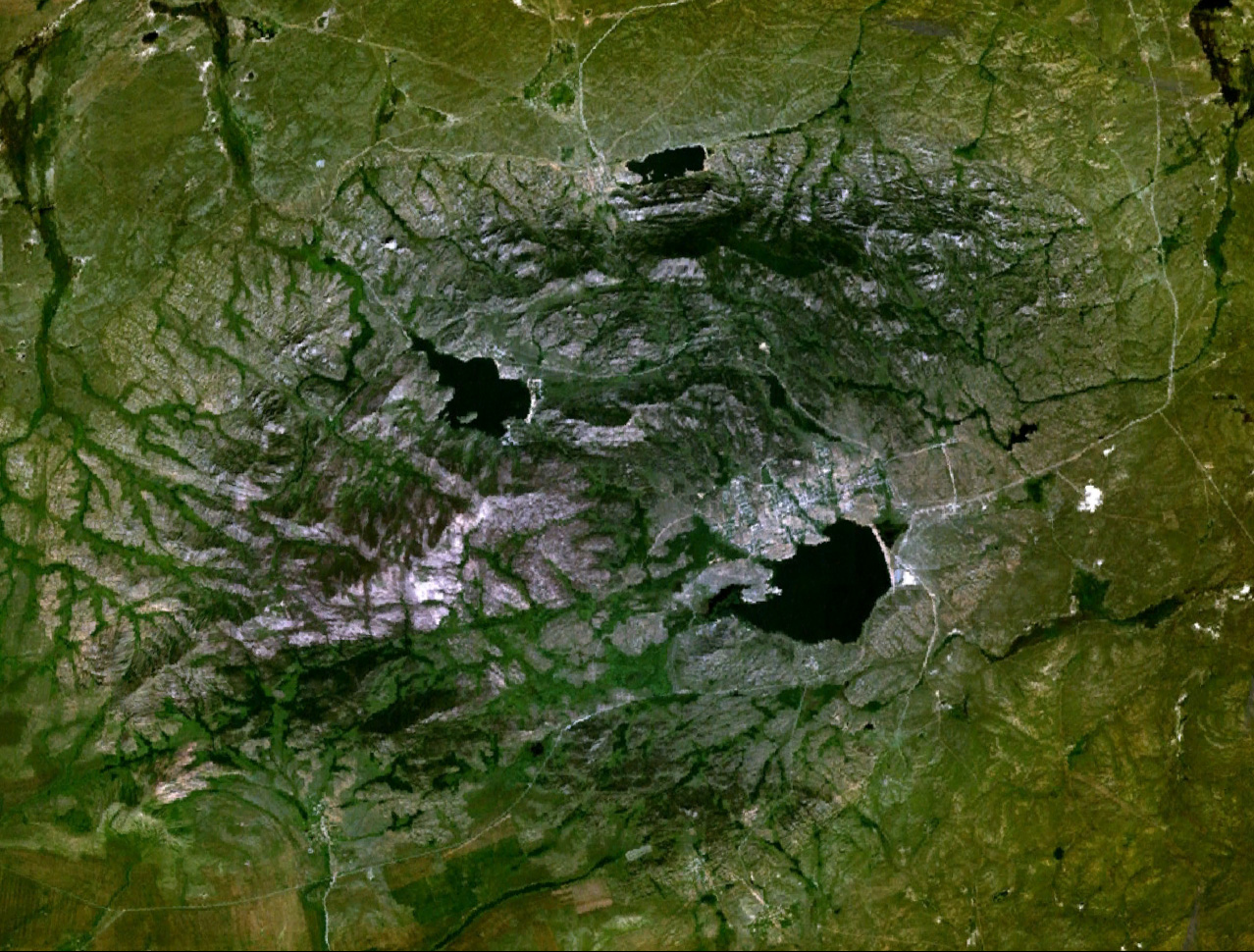
Landsat 7 image of the range without the westernmost part.

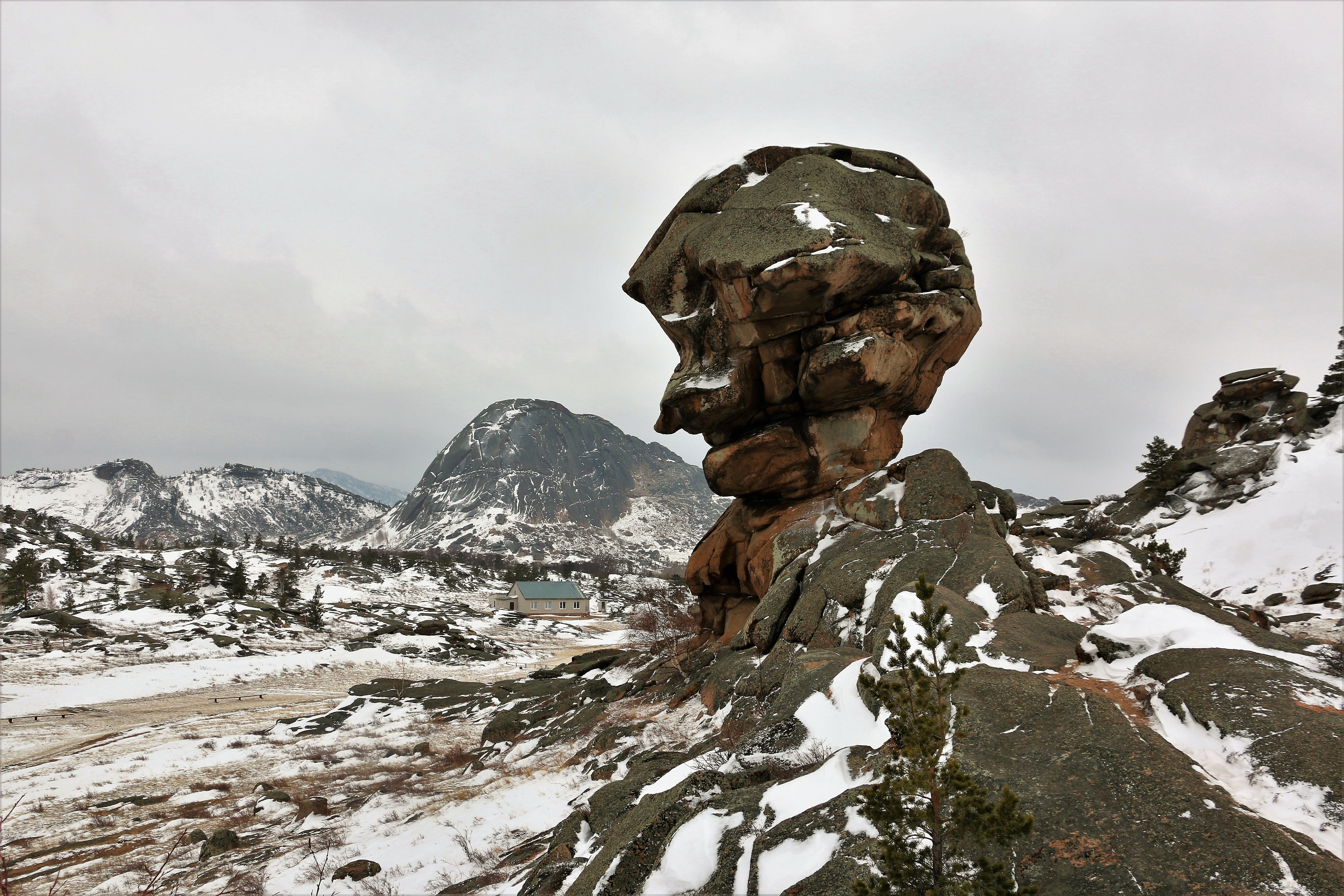
Bizarre rock formations.

== Flora ==
Below the rocky summits the slopes are covered by forests where larch and birch predominate. There is as well steppe vegetation made up of coarse feathergrass and forb grassland areas.

== See also ==
- Geography of Kazakhstan
