= Bayanaul District =

Coordinates: 50°50′24″N 75°40′12″E

Bayanaul
- District
- Баянауыл ауданы
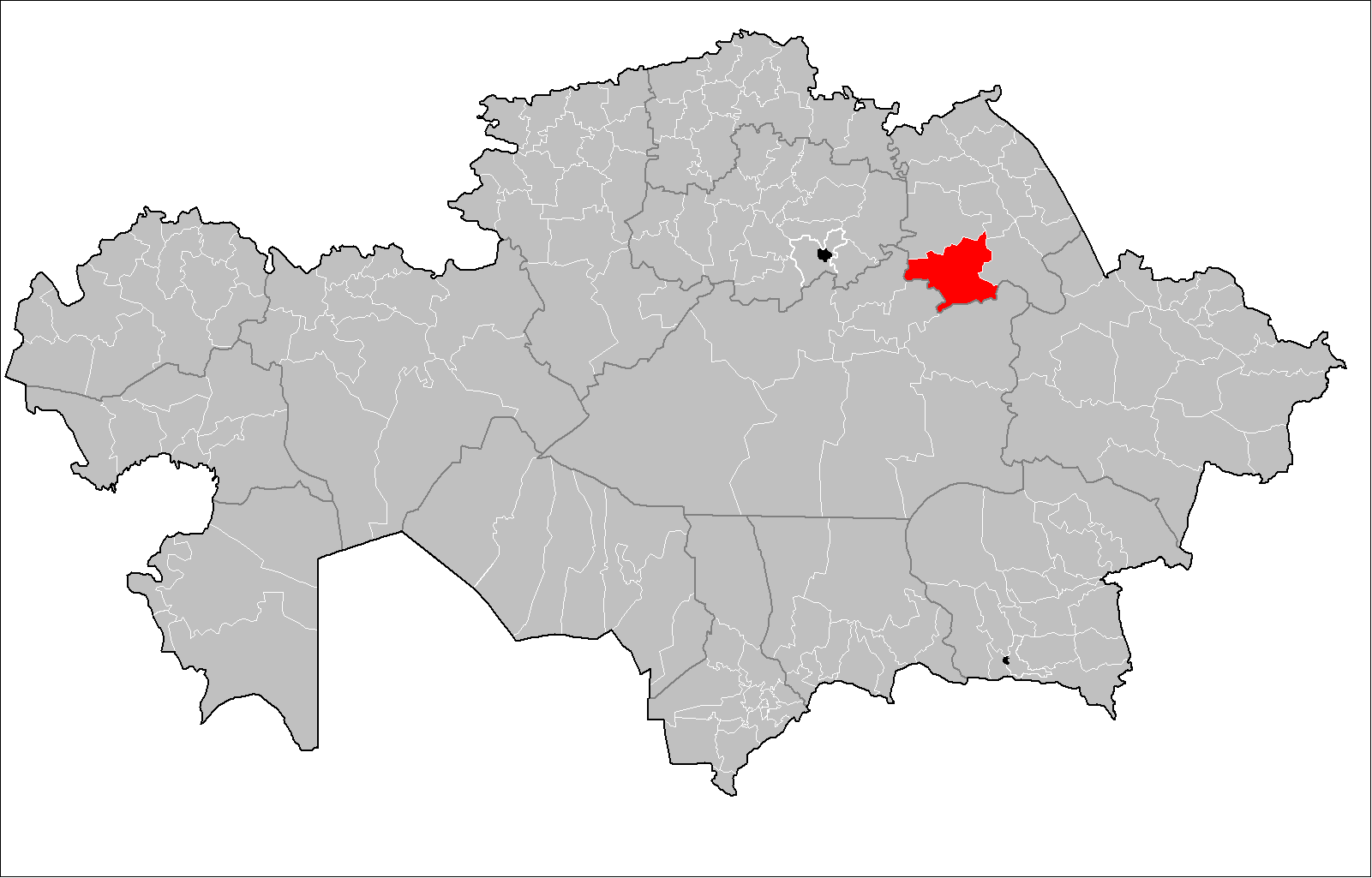
- Country: Kazakhstan
- Region: Pavlodar Region
- Administrative center: Bayanaul
- Founded: 1938

Government
  - Akim: Ardak Kontaev

Area
  - Total: 7,100 sq mi (18,500 km^{2})

Population (2013)
  - Total: 27,899
- Time zone: UTC+6 (East)

Bayanaul (Kazakh: Баянауыл ауданы, Baianauyl audany) is a district of Pavlodar Region in northern Kazakhstan. The administrative center of the district is the aul of Bayanaul. Population: 27,899 (2013 estimate); 28,296 (2009 census results); 32,985 (1999 census results).

== Geography ==
Bayanaul District lies in the Kazakh Uplands. 1,022 meters (3,353 ft) high mount Akbet in the Bayanaul Range is the highest point in the district and Tuzkol is the largest lake.
