= Pavlodar Region =

Region in northern Kazakhstan

Pavlodar Region Павлодар облысы (Kazakh) Павлодарская область (Russian)
- Region
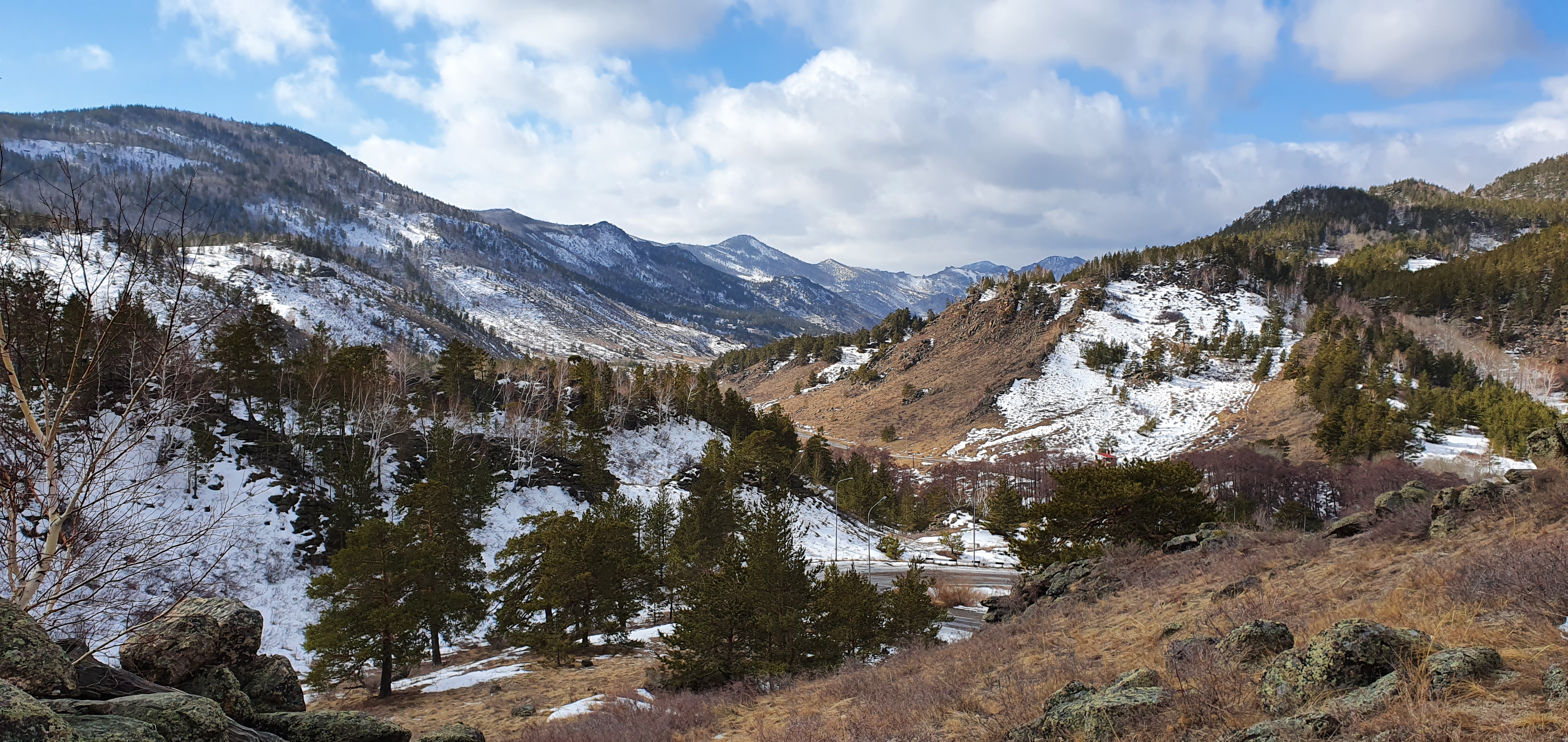
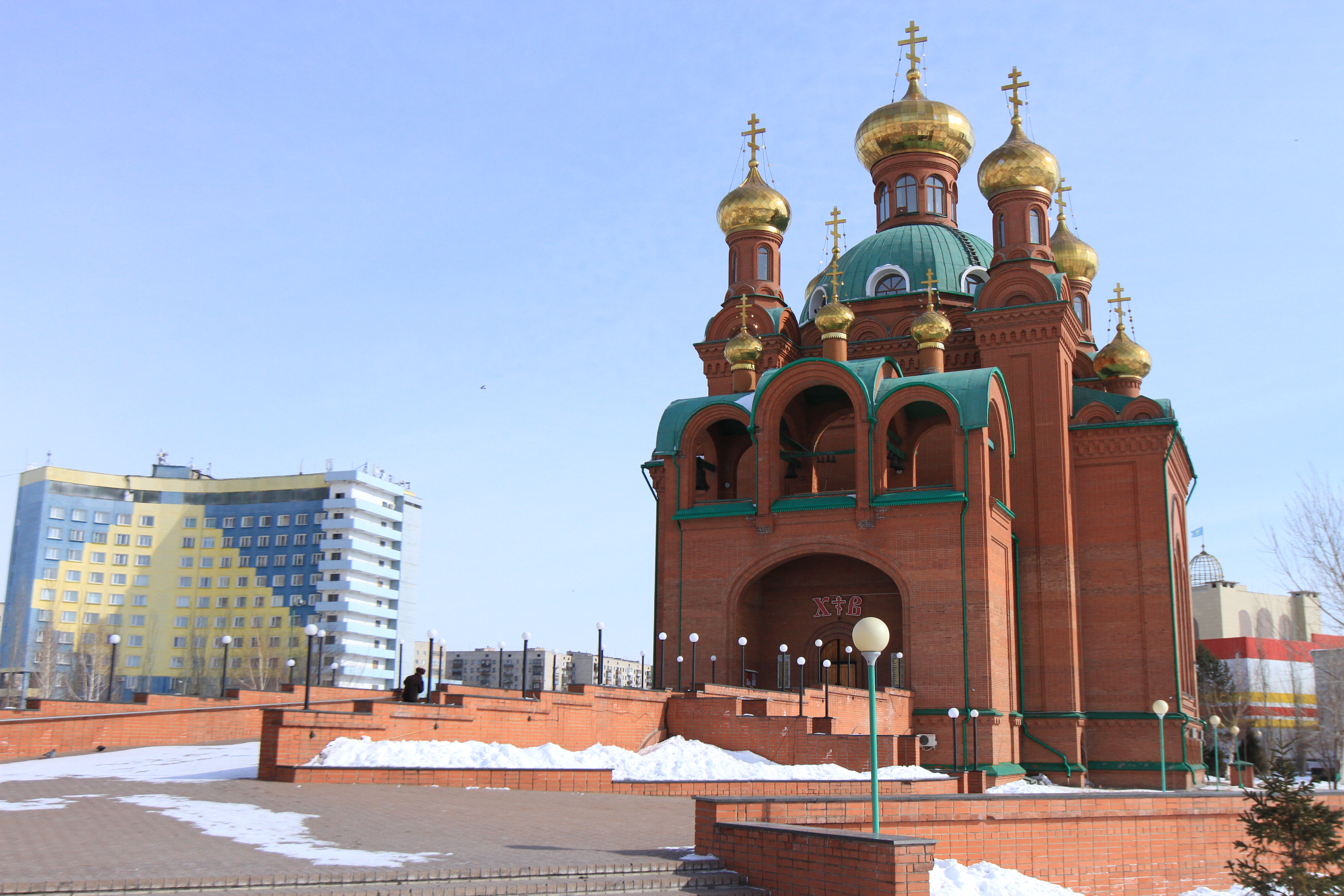
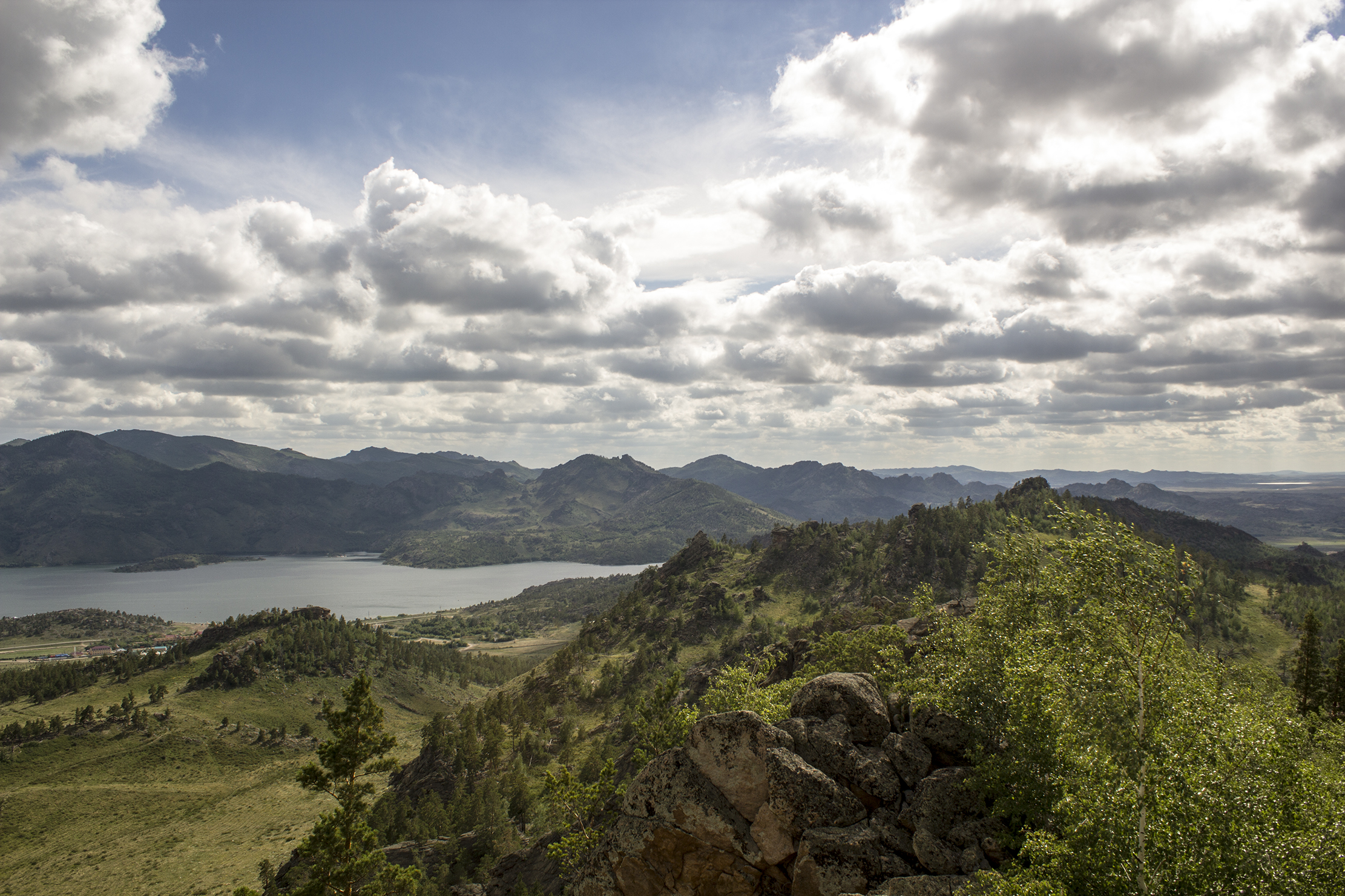
- From the top, Bayanaul Range, Pavlodar, Lake Jasybay

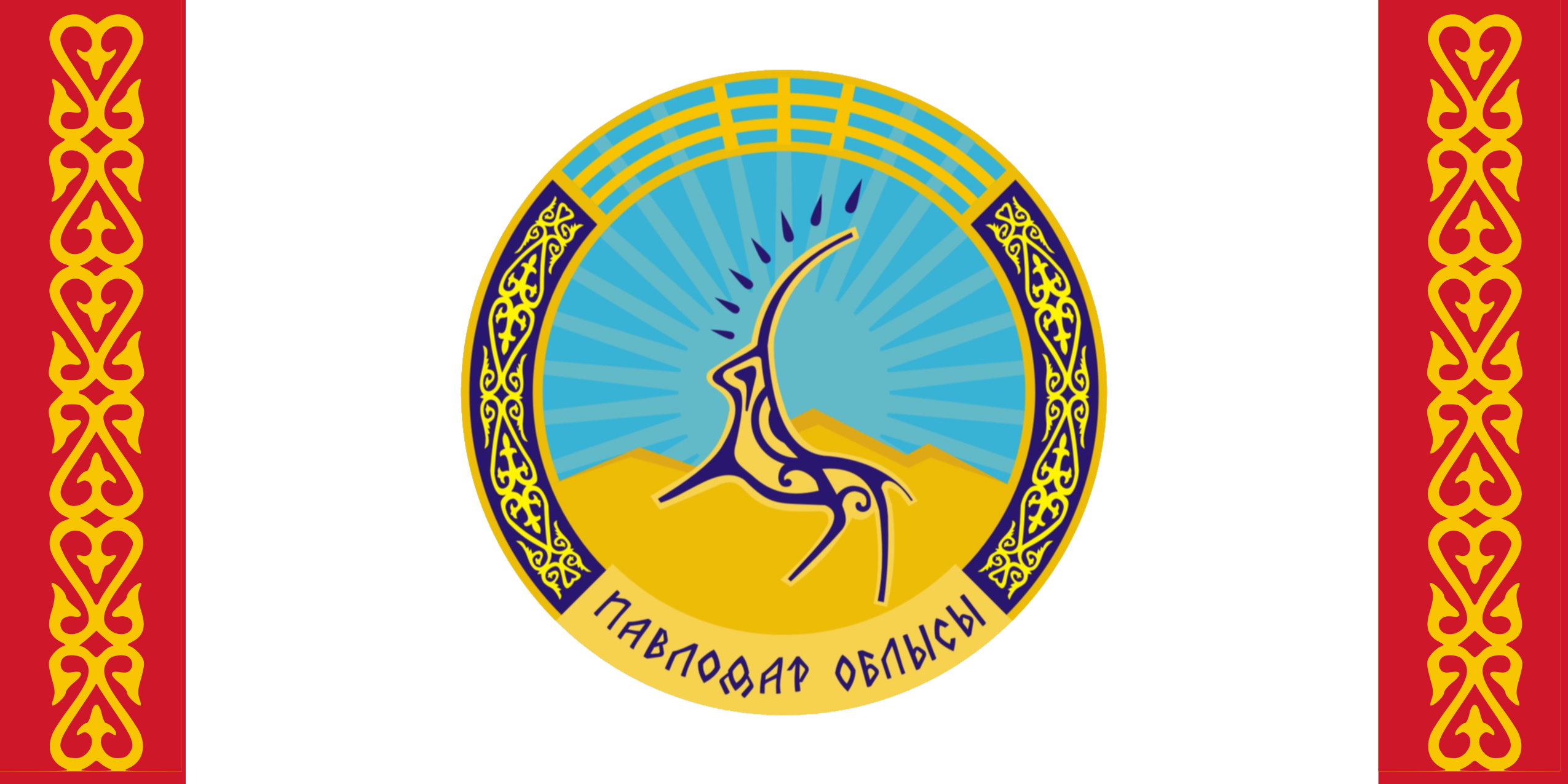
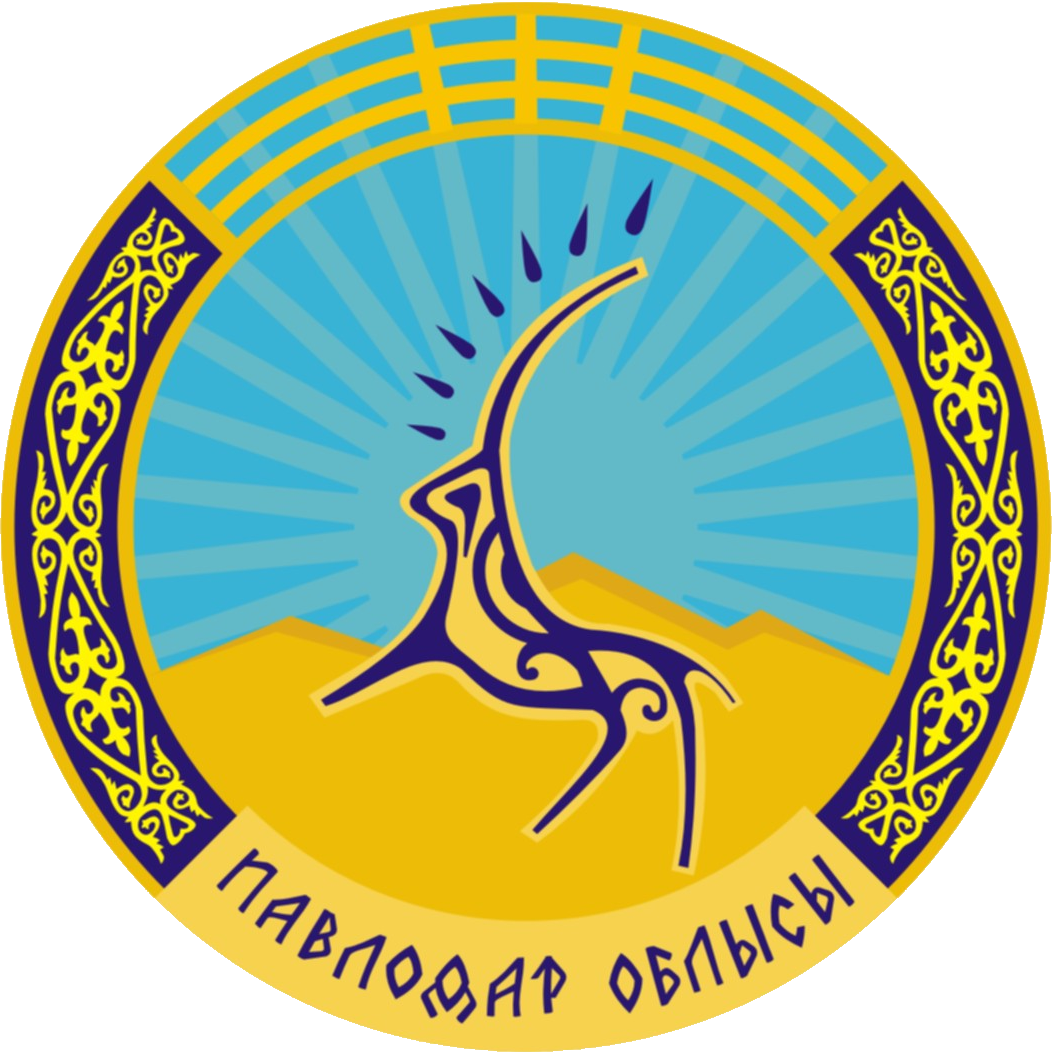
- Flag Coat of arms

- Map of Kazakhstan, location of Pavlodar Province highlighted
- Coordinates: 52°18′N 76°57′E
- Country: Kazakhstan
- Capital: Pavlodar

Government
  - Akim: Asain Baikhanov

Area
  - Total: 124,800 km^{2} (48,200 sq mi)

Population (1 January 2022)
  - Total: 756,511
  - Density: 6.062/km^{2} (15.70/sq mi)

GDP (Nominal, 2024)
  - Total: KZT 5,151 billion (US$ 10.817 billion) · 7th
  - Per capita: KZT 6,485,100 (US$ 13,619)
- Time zone: UTC+5
  - Summer (DST): UTC+5 (not observed)
- Postal codes: 140100 - 141200
- Area codes: +7 (718)
- ISO 3166 code: KZ-PAV
- Vehicle registration: 14, S
- Districts: 10
- Cities: 3
- Villages: 504
- HDI (2023): 0.850 very high · 3rd
- Website: http://www.pavlodar.gov.kz

Pavlodar Region (Note: Kazakh: Павлодар облысы, romanized: Pavlodar oblysy; Russian: Павлодарская область, romanized: Pavlodarskaya oblast') is a region of Kazakhstan. Its population was 742,475 (2009 census results) and before that 806,983 (1999 census results). The latest official estimate (as at the start of 2022) was 756,511. Its capital is the city of Pavlodar, which had a population of 360,014 at the start of 2018. Many people, especially Ukrainians, migrated to Pavlodar during the Soviet Union's Virgin Lands Campaign.

The Bayanaul National Park, a protected area of the Kazakh Uplands, is located in the Bayanaul Range, within 100 km of Ekibastuz.

== Geography ==
Pavlodar borders Russia (Altai Krai, Omsk Oblast and Novosibirsk Oblast) to the north, and the following Kazakh regions: Akmola (to the west), East Kazakhstan (to the south-east), North Kazakhstan (to the north-west), and Karaganda (to the south). The southern part of the district is in the Kazakh Uplands, while the northern part falls within the Baraba Plain and Kulunda Plain. The highest point of the region is Akbet, a 1,022 meters (3,353 ft) high summit located in the Bayanaul Range.

The Irtysh River flows from the Altay Mountains in China to Russia through the region; the Irtysh–Karaganda Canal crosses the western part, taking some of the river's water to Ekibastuz and Karaganda. The Sileti river also flows through the region. There are many lakes in the region, most of them saline, such as Siletiteniz, Kyzylkak, Koryakovka, Zhasybai, Zhalauly, Shureksor, Kudaikol, Karasor, Zhamantuz, Kalkaman, Tuzdysor, Maraldy, Zharagash and Ulken Tobylzhan, among others. Two of them are soda lakes: lake Borli and lake Uyaly.

== Administrative divisions ==
The region is administratively divided into ten districts (aydany) and three cities of regional importance - Pavlodar, Aksu, and Ekibastuz. The city administrations and districts with their populations are:

Administrative division	Population 1999 Census	Population 2009 Census	Population 2018 Estimate	Administrative centre
Aksu	73,165	67,665	70,224	Aksu
Ekibastuz	151,704	142,511	152,817	Ekibastuz
Pavlodar	317,809	336,810	360,014	Pavlodar
Aqtogay	21,056	15,114	12,621	Aktogay
Bayanaul	32,985	28,296	25,983	Bayanaul
Ertis	33,129	20,853	16,594	Ertis
Terengkol	31,666	22,208	20,183	Terengkol
Akkuly	19,859	14,593	12,444	Akkuly
May	16,859	12,601	10,367	Koktobe
Pavlodar	32,302	28,855	26,053	Pavlodar city
Sharbaqty	28,967	21,866	19,742	Sharbakty
Uspen	21,395	13,254	11,975	Uspenka
Zhelezin	26,293	17,849	15,722	Zhelezinka

^{*} Three localities in Pavlodar Region have city status. These are Pavlodar, Aksu, and Ekibastuz.

== Demographics ==
As of 2020, the Pavlodar Region has a population of 752,169.

Ethnic groups (2020):

- Kazakh: 53.07%
- Russian: 34.91%
- Ukrainian: 4.18%
- German: 2.66%
- Tatar: 1.84%
- Others: 3.34%

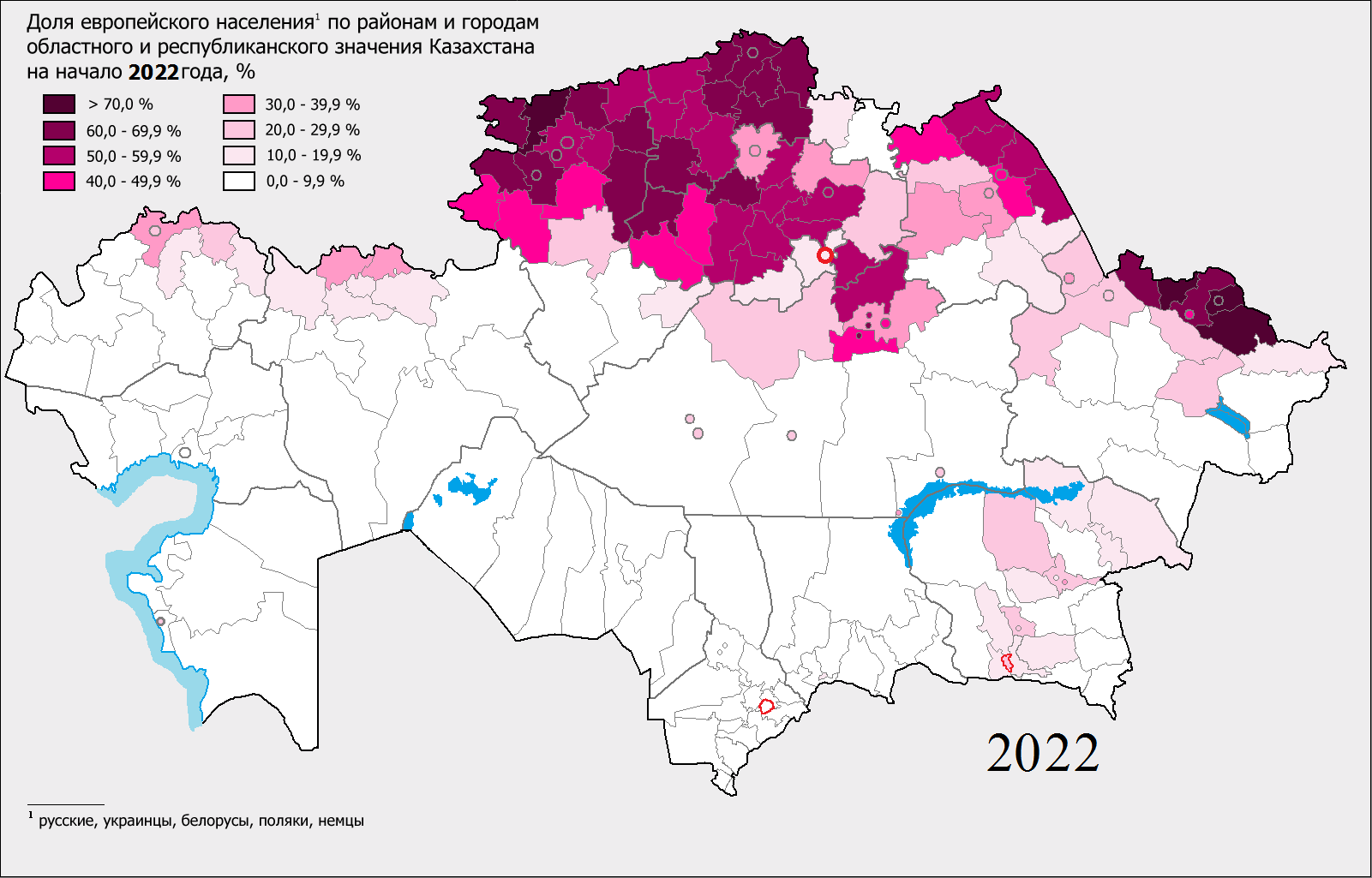
The share of the European population by districts and cities of regional and republican subordination Kazakhstan in 2022 > 70٪ 60.0 – 69.9 % 50.0 - 59.9 % 40.0 - 49.9 % 30.0 - 39.9 % 20.0 - 29.9 % 10.0 - 19.9 % 0.0 - 9.9 %
