= Bayanaul =

Bayanaul Баянауыл
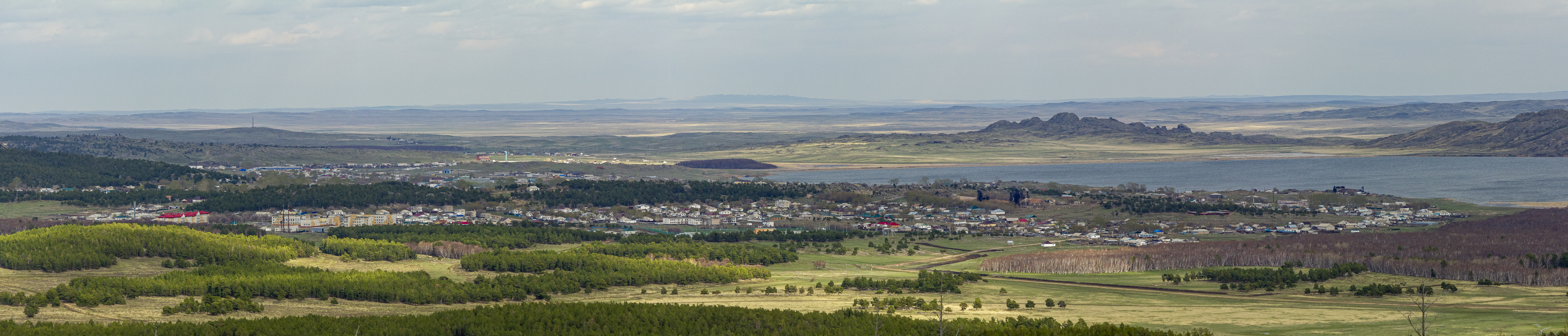

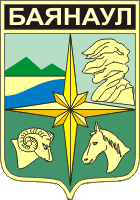
- Coat of arms

- Location in Kazakhstan
- Coordinates: 50°47′20″N 75°41′44″E
- Country: Kazakhstan
- Region: Pavlodar Region
- District: Bayanaul District
- Established: 1826

Area
  - Total: 4.2 sq mi (11 km^{2})

Population (2019)
  - Total: 5,893
- Time zone: UTC+5
- Postcode: 140300

Bayanaul (Kazakh: Баянауыл, romanized: Bayanawıl) is a settlement in Pavlodar Region, Kazakhstan. It is the capital of Bayanaul District and the administrative center of the Bayanaul rural district (KATO code - 553630100). Population: 5,893 (2009 census results); 5,998 (1999 census results).

== History ==
The village of Bayan-Aul was founded in 1826 by Siberian Cossacks. The first ataman of the village was appointed in 1834 as the head of the Bayanaul district - Nikolai Ilyich Potanin, the father of the future famous geographer, ethnographer, scientist and traveler Grigory Potanin.

In 1833, by order of the government, the Bayanaul external district was formed as part of the Omsk region. Shon Yedigin was elected senior sultan in the district.

In 1838, the district was abolished, the territory became part of the Semipalatinsk region.

In 1854, the Bayanaul district was again formed as part of the Siberian Kirghiz Region.

In 1868 the district was abolished. Bayanaul once again became part of the Semipalatinsk region.

== Geography ==
Bayanaul lies in the Kazakh Uplands, just below the slopes of Bayanaul Range, near lake Sabyndykol. The Bayanaul National Park, a 68,453 hectares (169,150 acres) protected area, is located in the district, within the perimeter of the mountain range.

== Climate ==
Climate data for Bayanaul (1991–2020, extremes 1958–present)
Month	Jan	Feb	Mar	Apr	May	Jun	Jul	Aug	Sep	Oct	Nov	Dec	Year
Record high °C (°F)	8.2 (46.8)	12.6 (54.7)	22.0 (71.6)	31.8 (89.2)	35.3 (95.5)	38.8 (101.8)	39.3 (102.7)	38.8 (101.8)	37.5 (99.5)	28.4 (83.1)	19.0 (66.2)	10.2 (50.4)	39.3 (102.7)
Mean daily maximum °C (°F)	−9.4 (15.1)	−7.4 (18.7)	−0.2 (31.6)	12.2 (54.0)	19.6 (67.3)	24.5 (76.1)	25.8 (78.4)	24.2 (75.6)	17.6 (63.7)	9.6 (49.3)	−1.2 (29.8)	−6.7 (19.9)	9.0 (48.3)
Daily mean °C (°F)	−13.9 (7.0)	−12.4 (9.7)	−5.0 (23.0)	6.3 (43.3)	13.4 (56.1)	18.8 (65.8)	20.2 (68.4)	18.3 (64.9)	11.7 (53.1)	4.6 (40.3)	−5.4 (22.3)	−10.8 (12.6)	3.8 (38.9)
Mean daily minimum °C (°F)	−17.6 (0.3)	−16.8 (1.8)	−9.5 (14.9)	0.6 (33.1)	7.2 (45.0)	12.8 (55.0)	14.7 (58.5)	12.4 (54.3)	6.1 (43.0)	0.3 (32.5)	−8.7 (16.3)	−14.5 (5.9)	−1.1 (30.1)
Record low °C (°F)	−41.1 (−42.0)	−38.2 (−36.8)	−37.2 (−35.0)	−23.9 (−11.0)	−7.8 (18.0)	−1.1 (30.0)	1.3 (34.3)	0.0 (32.0)	−8.2 (17.2)	−21.6 (−6.9)	−36.1 (−33.0)	−41.4 (−42.5)	−41.4 (−42.5)
Average precipitation mm (inches)	14.2 (0.56)	14.8 (0.58)	20.5 (0.81)	24.6 (0.97)	30.4 (1.20)	48.4 (1.91)	74.5 (2.93)	41.1 (1.62)	23.4 (0.92)	21.7 (0.85)	21.9 (0.86)	17.2 (0.68)	352.7 (13.89)
Average precipitation days (≥ 1.0 mm)	4.1	4.2	4.9	4.8	6.2	8	9.6	6.5	5.1	5.6	5.7	5.4	70.1
Source: Погода и Климат, NOAA
