= Kokozek =

Kokozek may refer to:

- Kokozek (river), a river in Pavlodar Region, Kazakhstan
- Kokozek, Karasay District, a village in Almaty Region
- Kokozek, Urzhar District, a village in Abai Region
- Kokozek, Bayzak District, a village in Zhambyl Region
