= Shandaksor =

Lake in Kazakhstan

- Шаңдақсор
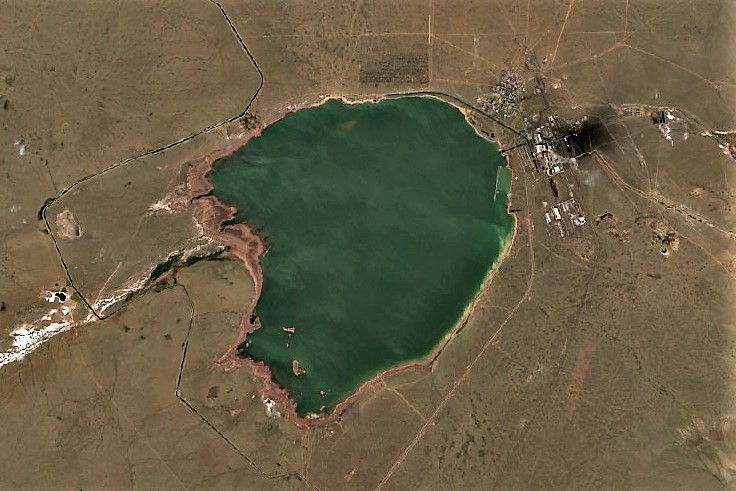
- Sentinel-2 image of the lake

- Location within Kazakhstan
- Location: Ekibastuz City Administration
- Coordinates: 52°00′05″N 75°24′51″E
- Type: reservoir
- Primary inflows: Irtysh–Karaganda Canal
- Basin countries: Kazakhstan
- Max. length: 8.4 kilometers (5.2 mi)
- Max. width: 6.5 kilometers (4.0 mi)
- Surface area: 41.7 square kilometers (16.1 sq mi)
- Max. depth: 6.1 meters (20 ft)
- Water volume: 0.26 cubic kilometers (0.062 cu mi)
- Residence time: UTC+6
- Surface elevation: ca 70 meters (230 ft)
- Islands: yes
- Settlements: Solnechny

Shandaksor (Kazakh: Шаңдақсор; Russian: Шандаксор) is a salt lake in the Ekibastuz City Administration, Pavlodar Region, Kazakhstan.

Shandaksor is one of the main lakes in the area surrounding Ekibastuz and is part of the Irtysh Water Management Basin. It is located 24 kilometers (15 mi) to the north of the city. Solnechny village and the Ekibastuz GRES-2 Power Station lie by its northeastern shore. It was formed by filling an endorheic intermittent lake (sor) with water from the Irtysh–Karaganda Canal in order to cool the adjacent thermal power station. The ashes of the station are dumped into nearby lake Karasor.

== Geography ==
Shandaksor is part of the Irtysh Basin. It stretches from southwest to northeast for roughly 8 kilometers (5.0 mi) and is about 6 kilometers (3.7 mi) wide. There are two small islands and a few little islets at the southern end of the lake. The northern end of larger lake Karasor lies 8 kilometers (5.0 mi) to the east. Smaller lake Zhyngyldy, with the Ekibastuz GRES-1 Power Station by its northern shore, lies 9 kilometers (5.6 mi) to the south of the southern lakeshore. Lake Tuzdysor lies 12 kilometers (7.5 mi) to the northeast and Shureksor 28 kilometers (17 mi) in the same direction.

Shandaksor usually freezes in November and thaws in April. The lakeshores are flat and the surrounding area is used for local livestock grazing. There are also some cultivated fields.

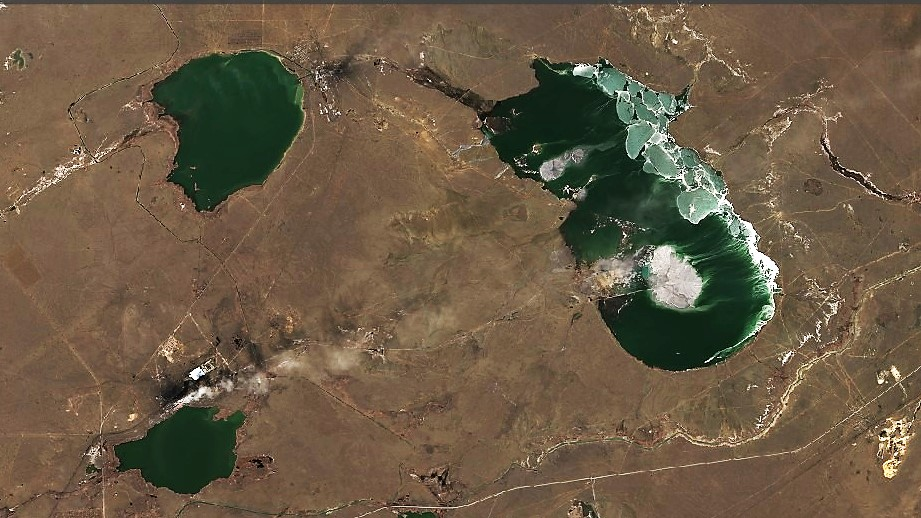
Sentinel-2 image of lake Karasor (right) with Shandaksor in the upper and Zhyngyldy in the lower left corner.

== Fauna ==
The lake is rich in fish, including crayfish, as well as species that have been released in it. The water of the lake is used for cooling the power plant. Studies have been carried out in order to assess the impact on the lake fauna. Ice fishing is practiced in Shandaksor in the winter

== See also ==
- List of lakes of Kazakhstan
