= Pogranichnik (Pavlodar Region) =

Village in Kazakhstan

Pogranichnik Пограничник
- Village
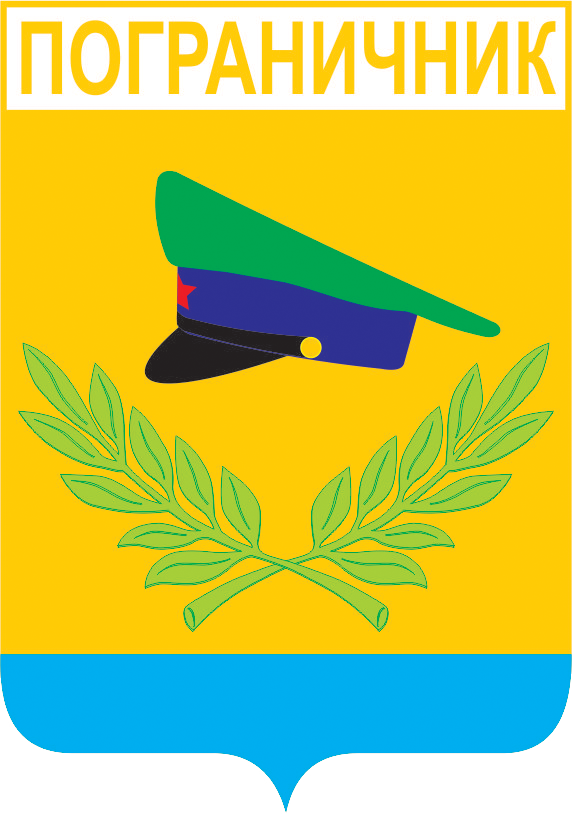
- Seal

- Location in Kazakhstan
- Coordinates: 52°06′32″N 76°24′21″E
- Country: Kazakhstan
- Region: Pavlodar Region
- City administration: Aksu City Administration
- Established: 1954

Population (2021)
  - Total: 939
- Time zone: UTC+6 (Omsk Time)
- Postcode: 140115

Pogranichnik (Kazakh: Пограничник), formerly Barlykbay, is a village in the Aksu City Administration, Pavlodar Region, Kazakhstan. It is part of Dostyk Rural District (KATO code - 551665100). Population: 994 (2009 census results); 1,170 (1999 census results).

== Geography ==
Pogranichnik is located 35 km (22 mi) to the WNW of Aksu City and 26 km (16 mi) to the northeast of Kalkaman. The village lies near lakes Sarykol and Uzynbulak, close to the northwestern end of lake Kalkaman. The Ekibastuz - Pavlodar highway passes by Pogranichnik.
