= Kokozek (river) =

River in Kazakhstan

Kokozek Көкөзек
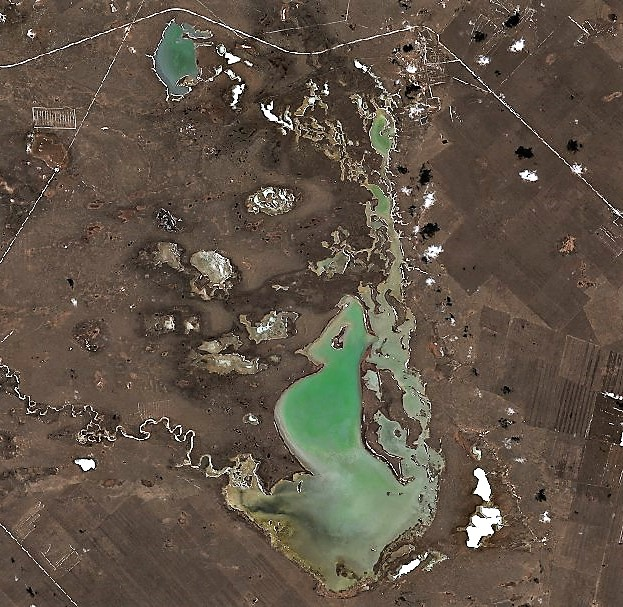
- Final stretch of river Kokozek and its mouth in lake Shureksor Sentinel-2 image.

- Mouth location in Kazakhstan

Location
- Countries: Kazakhstan

Physical characteristics
- Source: near Ekibastuz
  - coordinates: 51°46′26″N 75°04′26″E
- Mouth: Shureksor
  - coordinates: 52°14′00″N 75°43′30″E
  - elevation: 98 m (322 ft)
- Length: 90 km (56 mi)
- Basin size: 508 km^{2} (196 sq mi)
- Discharge
  - average: 0.06 m^{3}/s (2.1 cu ft/s)

The Kokozek (Kazakh: Көкөзек) is a river in the Aksu City Administration and Ekibastuz City Administration, Pavlodar Region, Kazakhstan. It is 90 kilometres (56 mi) long and has a catchment area of 508 square kilometres (196 sq mi).

The river is part of the Irtysh Basin. In the spring the Kokozek is used to water local livestock.

== Course ==
The Kokozek has its sources roughly 10 km (6.2 mi) to the WNW of Ekibastuz city. It heads first eastwards and then bends northeastwards to the northwest of lake Karasor. In its final stretch the river meanders strongly and bends southeastwards, entering lake Shureksor from the southwest.

The Kokozek flows across a sandy and loamy valley. Its channel is narrow and is bound by steep banks, on average not higher than 2 m (6 ft 7 in). The river usually flows only in the spring when the snows melt. By May it splits into separate ponds and then dries up before the summer.

== See also ==
- List of rivers of Kazakhstan
