= Zhyngyldy (lake) =

Lake in Kazakhstan

- Жыңғылдысор
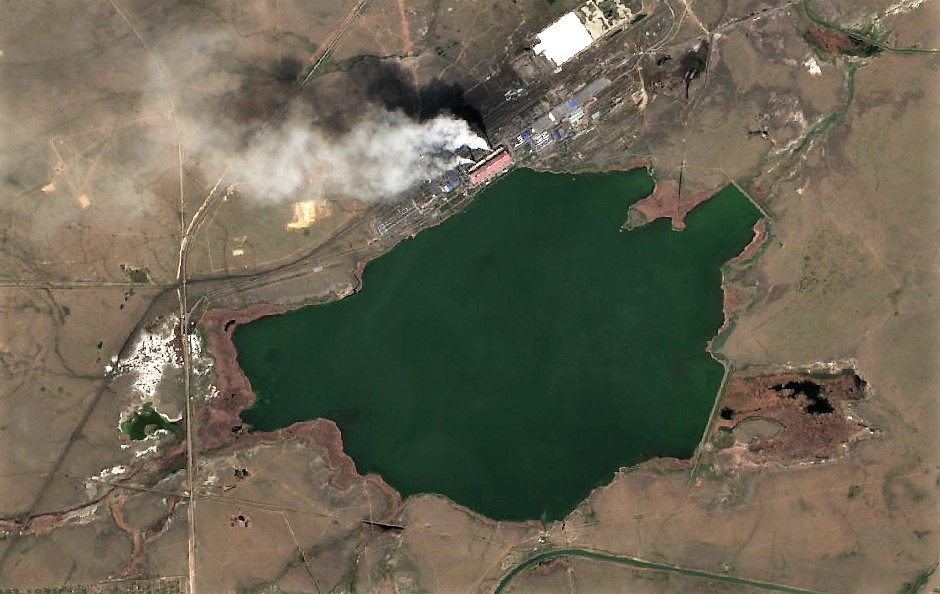
- Sentinel-2 image of the lake

- Location within Kazakhstan
- Location: Ekibastuz City Administration
- Coordinates: 51°51′57″N 75°22′43″E
- Type: reservoir
- Primary inflows: Irtysh–Karaganda Canal
- Basin countries: Kazakhstan
- Max. length: 5.7 kilometers (3.5 mi)
- Max. width: 3.9 kilometers (2.4 mi)
- Surface area: 10.8 square kilometers (4.2 sq mi)
- Max. depth: 4.6 meters (15 ft)
- Water volume: 0.09014 cubic kilometers (0.02163 cu mi)
- Residence time: UTC+6
- Surface elevation: 105 meters (344 ft)
- Settlements: Ekibastuz GRES-1 Power Station

Zhyngyldy or Zhyngyldysor (Kazakh: Жыңғылдысор) is a salt lake in the Ekibastuz City Administration, Pavlodar Region, Kazakhstan.

Zhyngyldy is one of the main lakes in the area surrounding Ekibastuz and is part of the Irtysh Water Management Basin. It is located 11 kilometers (6.8 mi) to the north of the city. The Ekibastuz GRES-1 Power Station rises by its northern shore. The reservoir was formed by filling an endorheic intermittent lake (sor) with water from the Irtysh–Karaganda Canal in order to cool the adjacent thermal power station. The ashes of the station are dumped into nearby lake Karasor.

== Geography ==
Zhyngyldy is part of the Irtysh Basin. It stretches from WSW to ENE for roughly 6 kilometers (3.7 mi). Lake Shandaksor, with the Ekibastuz GRES-2 Power Station by its eastern shore, lies 8 kilometers (5.0 mi) to the north of the northern lakeshore. Larger lake Karasor lies 18 kilometers (11 mi) to the ENE, Atygay (Атығай) 15 kilometers (9.3 mi) to the southeast and Kudaikol 35 kilometers (22 mi) to the east.

Zhyngyldy usually freezes in November and thaws in April. The lakeshores are flat and the surrounding area is used for local livestock grazing.

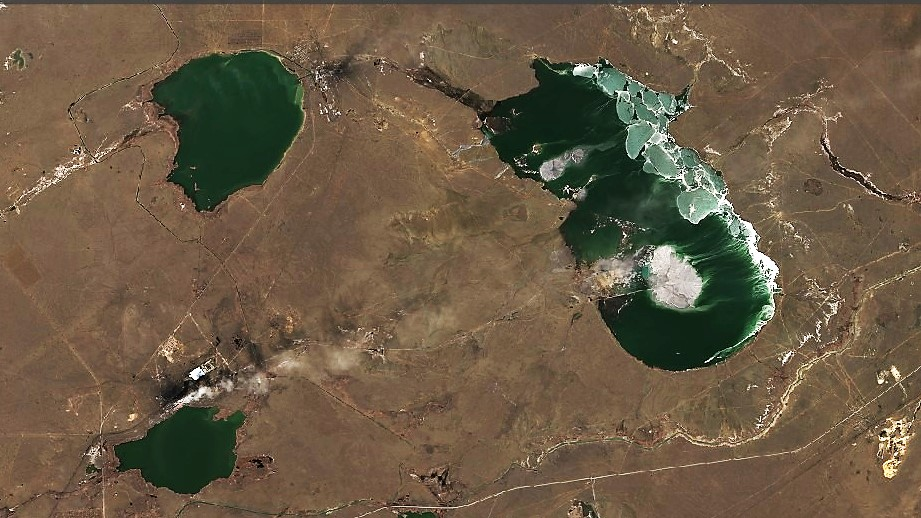
Sentinel-2 image of lake Karasor (right) with Zhyngyldy in the lower and Shandaksor in the upper left corner.

== See also ==
- List of lakes of Kazakhstan
