= Zhamantuz, Aksu City Administration =

Lake in Kazakhstan

Zhamantuz
- Жамантұз
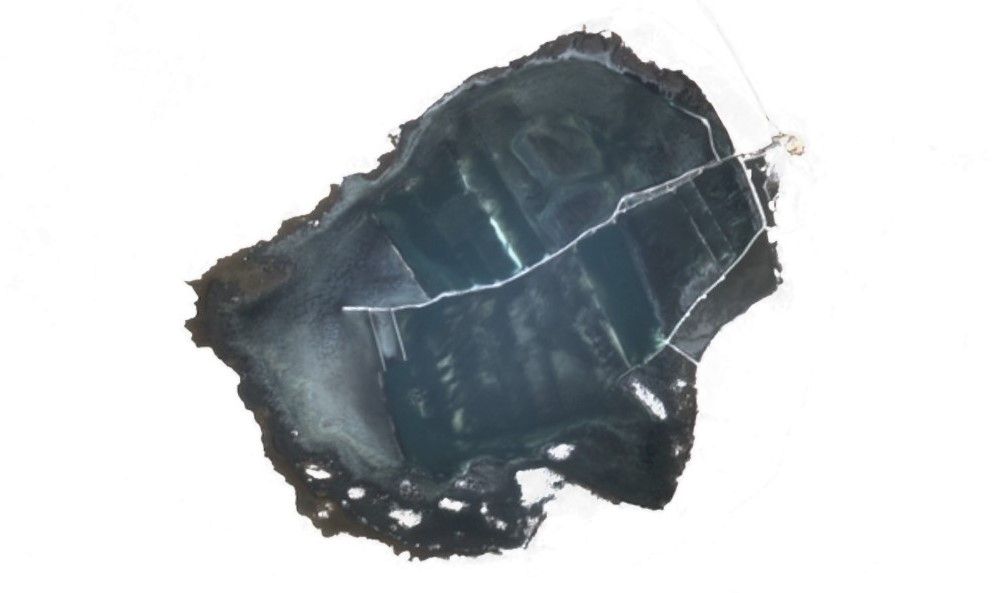
- Sentinel-2 picture of the lake

- Location within Kazakhstan
- Location: Aksu City Administration
- Coordinates: 51°44′36″N 76°18′31″E
- Type: endorheic lake
- Basin countries: Kazakhstan
- Max. length: 3.3 kilometers (2.1 mi)
- Max. width: 2.6 kilometers (1.6 mi)
- Surface area: 5.7 square kilometers (2.2 sq mi)
- Residence time: UTC+6:00
- Surface elevation: 123.5 meters (405 ft)

Zhamantuz (Kazakh: Жамантұз) is a salt lake in the Aksu City Administration, Pavlodar Region, Kazakhstan.

The lake lies 50 kilometers (31 mi) to the southwest of Aksu city. The area surrounding the lake is used for livestock grazing in the spring.

== Geography ==
Zhamantuz is an endorheic lake of the northern end of the Kazakh Uplands. It lies at an elevation of 123.5 meters (405 ft). The Irtysh flows 60 kilometers (37 mi) to the east of the eastern shores of the lake.

There are a number of lakes in its vicinity, such as Kudaikol 23 kilometers (14 mi) to the northwest, Altybaysor 22 kilometers (14 mi) to the southeast and Kalkaman, 33 kilometers (21 mi) to the northeast.

== See also ==
- List of lakes of Kazakhstan
