= Kudaikol =

Lake in Kazakhstan

- Құдайкөл
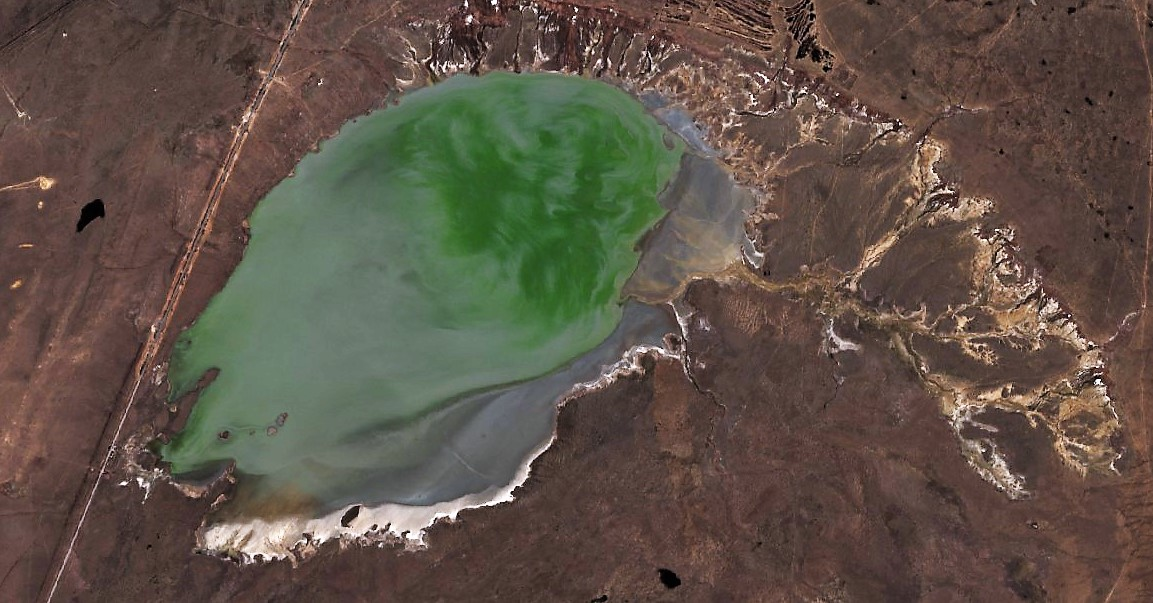
- Sentinel-2 image of the lake

- Location within Kazakhstan
- Location: near Kalkaman
- Coordinates: 51°51′59″N 75°58′37″E
- Type: endorheic
- Basin countries: Kazakhstan
- Max. length: 4.2 kilometers (2.6 mi)
- Max. width: 3.4 kilometers (2.1 mi)
- Surface area: 10.8 square kilometers (4.2 sq mi)
- Residence time: UTC+6
- Shore length^{1}: 14.6 kilometers (9.1 mi)
- Surface elevation: 94 meters (308 ft)
- Islands: none
- Settlements: Kudaikol, Kalkaman
- ^{1} Shore length is not a well-defined measure.

Kudaikol (Kazakh: Құдайкөл) is a salt lake in the Ekibastuz City Administration, Pavlodar Region, Kazakhstan.

Kudaikol is one of the lakes in the area surrounding Ekibastuz. It is located 33 kilometers (21 mi) to the ENE of the city and 6 kilometers (3.7 mi) to the south of Kalkaman. Kudaikol village lies 4.5 kilometers (2.8 mi) to the northeast. The A17 Highway passes close to the western edge of the lake.

== Geography ==
Kudaikol is an endorheic lake in the Irtysh Basin. It stretches from northeast to southwest for roughly 7 kilometers (4.3 mi) and is about 5 kilometers (3.1 mi) wide. Larger lake Karasor lies 12 kilometers (7.5 mi) to the northwest, and Atygay 22 kilometers (14 mi) to the southwest of the southwestern end. Other lakes in the vicinity are Zhamantuz, located 23 kilometers (14 mi) to the southeast and Kalkaman, 36 kilometers (22 mi) to the northeast.

A small river flows into the lake from the east. The lake is fed by snow and rain. It usually freezes in November and thaws in April. The lakeshores are flat, muddy in the southwestern part. The surrounding area is pasture for local livestock. Kudaikol is suitable for watering cattle only in the spring, before the shoreline recedes and the water becomes too salty.

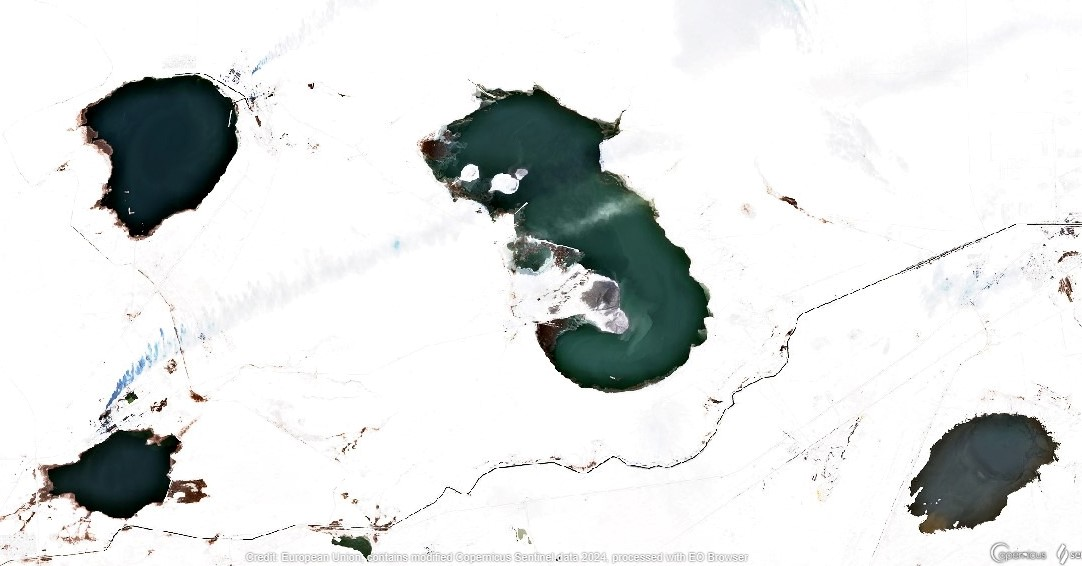
Sentinel-2 image of Karasor (centre) with lake Kudaikol in the lower right corner.

== See also ==
- List of lakes of Kazakhstan
