= Atygay =

Atygay (Kazakh: Атығай) may refer to:

- Atygay (lake), a lake in the Ekibastuz City Administration, Pavlodar Region, Kazakhstan
- Atygay (village), a village in the Ekibastuz City Administration, Pavlodar Region, Kazakhstan
