= Kalkaman (disambiguation) =

Kalkaman (Kazakh: Қалқаман) may refer to:

- Kalkaman, a village in the Aksu City Administration, Pavlodar Region, Kazakhstan
- Kalkaman (lake), a lake in the Aksu City Administration, Pavlodar Region, Kazakhstan
- Kalkaman, Almaty, a metro station in Almaty, Almaty Region, Kazakhstan
