= Maysor (Irtysh basin) =

Lake in Kazakhstan

- Майсор
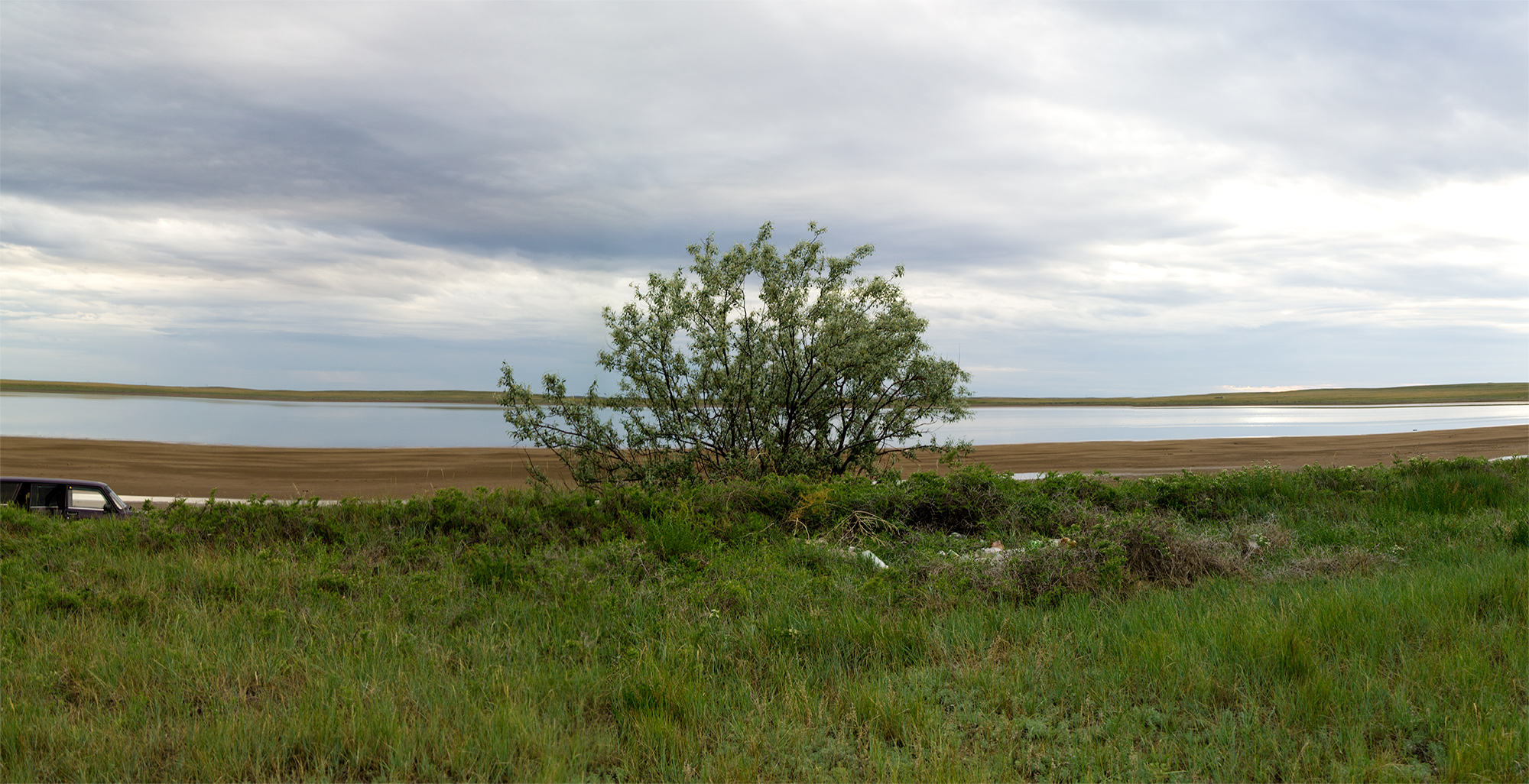
- Panorama of the lake

- Location within Kazakhstan
- Location: Ekibastuz City Administration
- Coordinates: 51°37′29″N 75°10′55″E
- Type: endorheic
- Basin countries: Kazakhstan
- Max. length: 2.2 kilometers (1.4 mi)
- Max. width: 1.6 kilometers (0.99 mi)
- Surface area: 3.1 square kilometers (1.2 sq mi)
- Residence time: UTC+6
- Shore length^{1}: 6.9 kilometers (4.3 mi)
- Surface elevation: 216 meters (709 ft)
- ^{1} Shore length is not a well-defined measure.

Maysor (Kazakh and Russian: Майсор) is a salt lake in the Ekibastuz City Administration, Pavlodar Region, Kazakhstan.

Maysor is located 10 kilometers (6.2 mi) to the southwest of Ekibastuz city. Ekibastuz Airport lies 0.8 kilometers (0.50 mi) to the south.

== Geography ==
Maysor is an endorheic lake in the basin of the Irtysh river. Some sections of the shore have clusters of reeds. There are several small lakes in the surrounding area.

Maysor fills with precipitation and groundwater. The lake has water all year round. Its surface freezes in the second half of November and thaws in the second half of April.

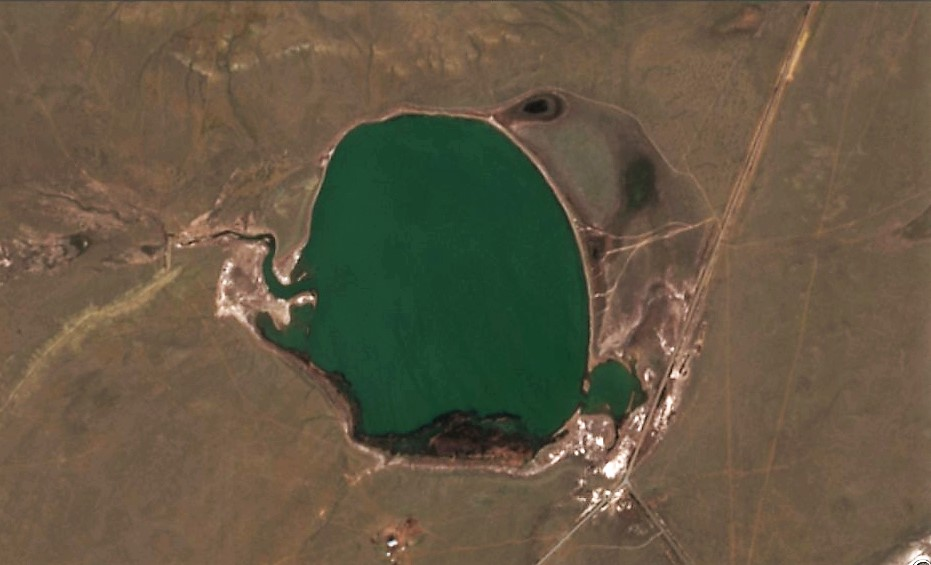
Sentinel-2 image of the lake.

== See also ==
- List of lakes of Kazakhstan
