= Maykaiyn =

Village in Kazakhstan

Maykaiyn Майқайың
- Village
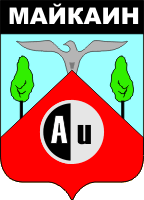
- Seal

- Location in Kazakhstan
- Coordinates: 51°27′20″N 75°47′54″E
- Country: Kazakhstan
- Region: Pavlodar Region
- District: Bayanaul District
- Established: 1915

Population (2021)
  - Total: 7,459
- Time zone: UTC+5
- Postcode: 140308

Maykaiyn (Kazakh: Майқайың; Russian: Майкаин) is a village in Bayanaul District, Pavlodar Region, Kazakhstan. It is the head of the Maykaiyn Village Administration.

Population: 8,761 (2009 census results); 9,224 (1999 census results).

== Geography ==
Maykaiyn is located 38 km (24 mi) to the southwest of Ekibastuz, near lake Angren, which lies 11 kilometers (6.8 mi) to the northwest. There is an open-pit mine in the town.
