= Angren (lake) =

Salt lake in Kazakhstan

- Ангрен
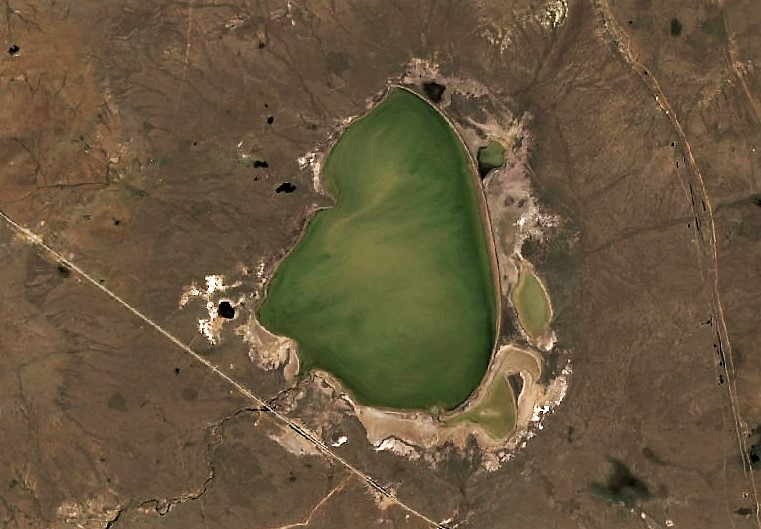
- Sentinel-2 image of the lake.

- Location within Kazakhstan
- Location: Ekibastuz City Administration
- Coordinates: 51°33′01″N 75°38′49″E
- Type: endorheic
- Basin countries: Kazakhstan
- Max. length: 3.9 kilometers (2.4 mi)
- Max. width: 2.9 kilometers (1.8 mi)
- Surface area: 7.3 square kilometers (2.8 sq mi)
- Residence time: UTC+5
- Surface elevation: 204 meters (669 ft)
- Settlements: Maykayin

Angren (Kazakh: Ангрен; Russian: Ангрен) is a salt lake in the Ekibastuz City Administration, Pavlodar Region, Kazakhstan.

Angren is located 23 kilometers (14 mi) to the southeast of Ekibastuz, close to the border with Bayanaul District. The lake is part of the Irtysh Water Management Basin. Maykaiyn village lies 11 kilometers (6.8 mi) to the southeast of its southern end.

== Geography ==
Angren is an endorheic lake in the Irtysh Basin. It stretches from north to south for roughly 4 kilometers (2.5 mi). Lake Atygay lies 17 kilometers (11 mi) to the north.

== Flora and fauna ==
Angren is surrounded by dry steppe.

== See also ==
- List of lakes of Kazakhstan
