= Yevgenyevka (Pavlodar Region) =

Village in Pavlodar Region, Kazakhstan

Yevgenyevka Евгеньевка
- Village
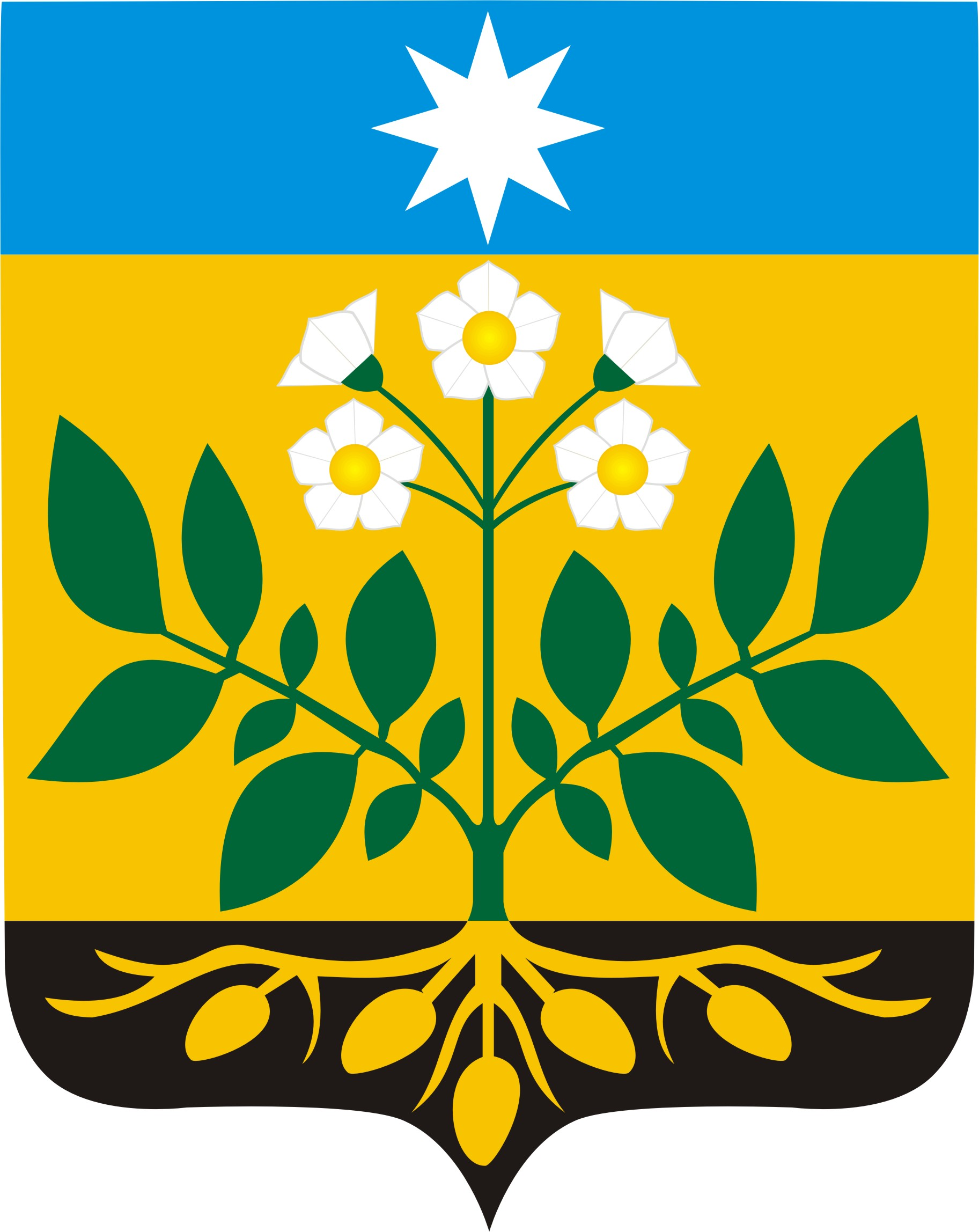
- Seal

- Location in Kazakhstan
- Coordinates: 51°57′44″N 76°46′57″E
- Country: Kazakhstan
- Region: Pavlodar Region
- City administration: Aksu City Administration
- Established: 1912
- Elevation: 125 m (410 ft)

Population (2009)
  - Total: 1,950
- Time zone: UTC+5
- Postcode: 140107

Yevgenyevka (Kazakh: Евгеньевка) is a village in the Aksu City Administration, Pavlodar Region, Kazakhstan. It is the center of the Yevgenyevka Rural District (KATO code - 551645100). Population: 1,950 (2009 census results); 1,838 (1999 census results).

== Geography ==
Yevgenyevka is located 12 km (7.5 mi)southwest of Aksu City. It lies near lake Kalkaman.
