= Ekıbastūz Airport =

Airport in Kazakhstan

Ekıbastūz
- IATA: EKB; ICAO: UASB

Summary
- Airport type: Public
- Location: Ekibastuz City Administration
- Elevation AMSL: 236 m / 774 ft
- Coordinates: 51°35′36″N 075°13′23″E

Maps
- Location in Kazakhstan
- Interactive map of Ekıbastūz

Runways
| Direction | Length | | Surface |
| Direction | m | ft | Surface |
|---|---|---|---|
| 05/23 | 2,500 | 8,202 | Asphalt |

Ekıbastūz Airport (IATA: EKB, ICAO: UASB) is an airport in the Ekibastuz City Administration, Kazakhstan. It is located 16 km (9.9 mi) south-west of Ekıbastūz. It usually handles small airliners.

Lake Maysor lies a little bit to the north, close to the airport road.
