= Shureksor =

Lake in Kazakhstan

- Шүрексор
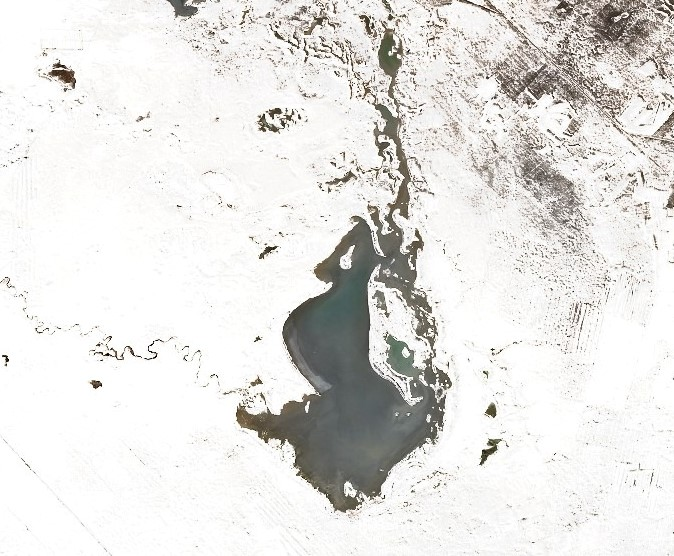
- Sentinel-2 picture of the lake in the early spring

- Location within Kazakhstan
- Location: Ishim Plain
- Coordinates: 52°15′23″N 75°47′44″E
- Type: endorheic lake
- Primary inflows: Kokozek
- Catchment area: 1,784 square kilometers (689 sq mi)
- Basin countries: Kazakhstan
- Max. length: 24.7 kilometers (15.3 mi)
- Max. width: 10.2 kilometers (6.3 mi)
- Surface area: 80.94 square kilometers (31.25 sq mi)
- Residence time: UTC+6:00
- Surface elevation: 98 meters (322 ft)

Shureksor (Kazakh: Шүрексор) is a salt lake in the Aksu City Administration, Pavlodar Region, Kazakhstan.

The lake lies 58 kilometers (36 mi) to the NNE of Ekibastuz city. The area surrounding Shureksor is used for grazing and for livestock watering in the spring.

== Geography ==
Shureksor is an endorheic lake of the Irtysh Basin. It lies at an elevation of 98 meters (322 ft). The Irtysh flows 66 kilometers (41 mi) to the east of the eastern shores of the lake.

Shureksor is a sprawling lake, stretching from north to south for almost 25 kilometers (16 mi). The southern half of the lake reaches a width of over 10 kilometers (6.2 mi), while the northern section is very narrow and with an irregular shoreline. River Kokozek has its mouth in the southwestern lakeshore. Lake Karasor lies 19 kilometers (12 mi) to the SSW, Tuzdysor 15 kilometers (9.3 mi) to the southwest of the southern shores, Sholakbulaksor (Шолақбұлақсор) 6 kilometers (3.7 mi) to the north of the northern end, and Taikonyr 35 kilometers (22 mi) to the north.

== See also ==
- List of lakes of Kazakhstan
