= Angren =

Angren may refer to:

- Angren, Uzbekistan, town near Tashkent, Uzbekistan
- Angren River, river in Tashkent Province of Uzbekistan
- Angren (lake), Pavlodar Region, Kazakhstan
- River Isen, a fictional river in Middle-earth, also called Angren
- Ngamring County, pinyin Angren, county in Tibet
