= Tuzdysor =

Lake in Kazakhstan

- Тұздысор
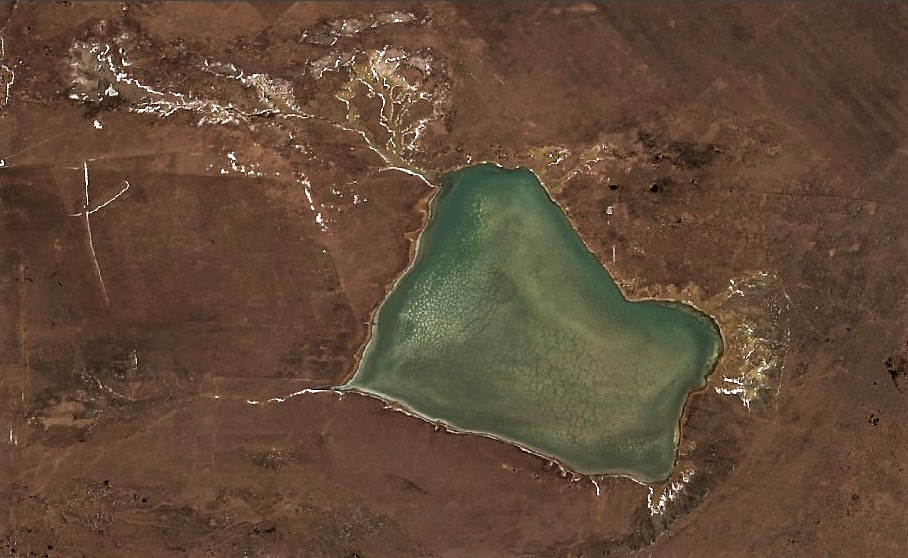
- Sentinel-2 image of the lake in 2018

- Location within Kazakhstan
- Location: Ekibastuz City Administration
- Coordinates: 52°06′30″N 75°33′36″E
- Type: endorheic
- Basin countries: Kazakhstan
- Max. length: 3.6 kilometers (2.2 mi)
- Max. width: 3 kilometers (1.9 mi)
- Surface area: 10.85 square kilometers (4.19 sq mi)
- Residence time: UTC+6
- Surface elevation: 107 meters (351 ft)

Tuzdysor (Kazakh: Тұздысор; Russian: Туздысор) is a salt lake in the Ekibastuz City Administration, Pavlodar Region, Kazakhstan.

Tuzdysor is one of the main lakes in the area surrounding Ekibastuz and is part of the Irtysh Water Management Basin. It is located 40 kilometers (25 mi) to the NNE of the city. There is commercial salt extraction at the lake, part of a project that has been implemented recently.

== Geography ==
Tuzdysor is an endorheic lake in the Irtysh Basin. It stretches from west to east for 3.6 kilometers (2.2 mi) and is about 3 kilometers (1.9 mi) wide. The northern end of larger lake Karasor lies 7 kilometers (4.3 mi) to the southeast and lake Shandaksor, with the Ekibastuz GRES-2 Power Station by its eastern shore, is located 9 kilometers (5.6 mi) to the southwest. Sprawling lake Shureksor lies 15 kilometers (9.3 mi) to the northeast.

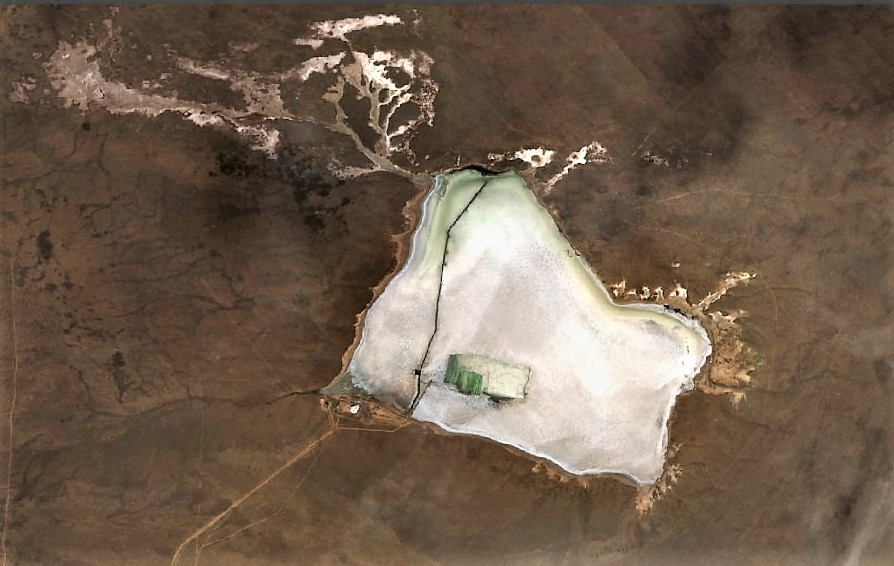
Salt extraction at Tuzdysor.

== See also ==
- List of lakes of Kazakhstan
