= Atygay (lake) =

Lake in Kazakhstan

- Атығай
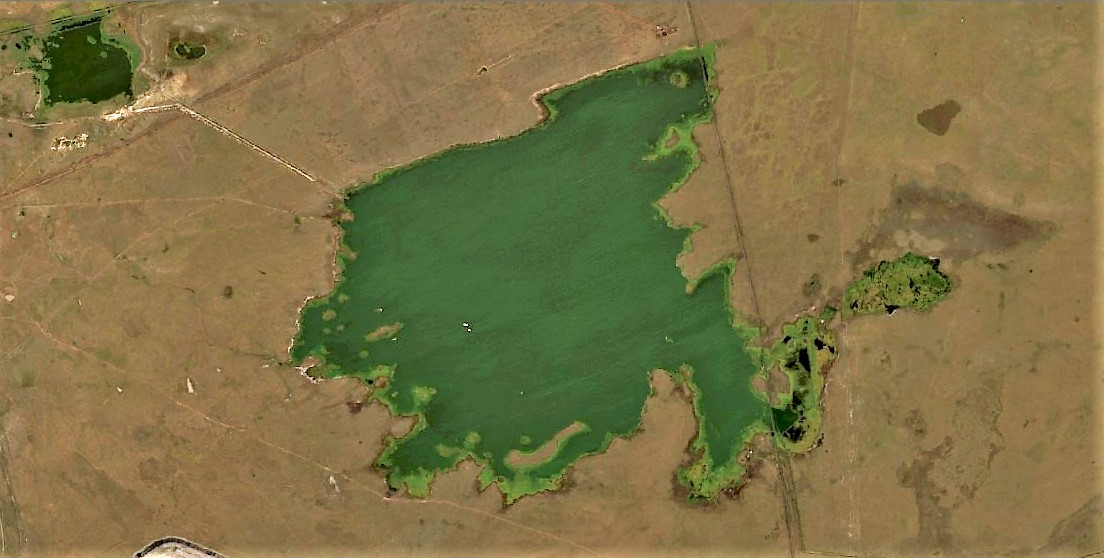
- Sentinel-2 image of the lake in September.

- Location within Kazakhstan
- Location: Ekibastuz City Administration
- Coordinates: 51°44′35″N 75°35′49″E
- Type: endorheic
- Basin countries: Kazakhstan
- Max. length: 6.1 kilometers (3.8 mi)
- Max. width: 3.8 kilometers (2.4 mi)
- Surface area: 13 square kilometers (5.0 sq mi)
- Residence time: UTC+6
- Surface elevation: 90 meters (300 ft)
- Settlements: Atygay

Atygay (Kazakh: Атығай; Russian: Атыгай) is a salt lake in the Ekibastuz City Administration, Pavlodar Region, Kazakhstan.

Atygay is one of the main lakes surrounding Ekibastuz and is located 6.5 kilometers (4.0 mi) to the ENE of the city. The lake is part of the Irtysh Water Management Basin. Atygay village lies 4 kilometers (2.5 mi) to the west of its western shore.

== Geography ==
Atygay is an endorheic lake in the Irtysh Basin. It stretches from WSW to ENE for roughly 6 kilometers (3.7 mi). Larger lake Karasor lies 15 kilometers (9.3 mi) to the NNE, Zhyngyldysor 15 kilometers (9.3 mi) to the northwest, Kudaikol 23 kilometers (14 mi) to the northeast, and Angren 17 kilometers (11 mi) to the south.

Atygay is fed by snow and rain. It usually freezes in November and thaws in April.

== Ecology ==
Atygay is a natural salt lake that is used as an evaporation reservoir for the wastewater of Ekibastuz city. The polluted water drains through a ditch from a small lake located 2 kilometers (1.2 mi) to the NW where the solid waste settles. Lake Atygay has fish, such as perch, that reach big sizes and attract fishermen. Authorities warn everyone fishing in the lake about consuming the fish caught in its waters owing to the high concentration of toxic substances.

== See also ==
- Bylkyldak (lake)
- List of lakes of Kazakhstan
