= Karasor (lake, Ekibastuz) =

Lake in Kazakhstan

- Қарасор
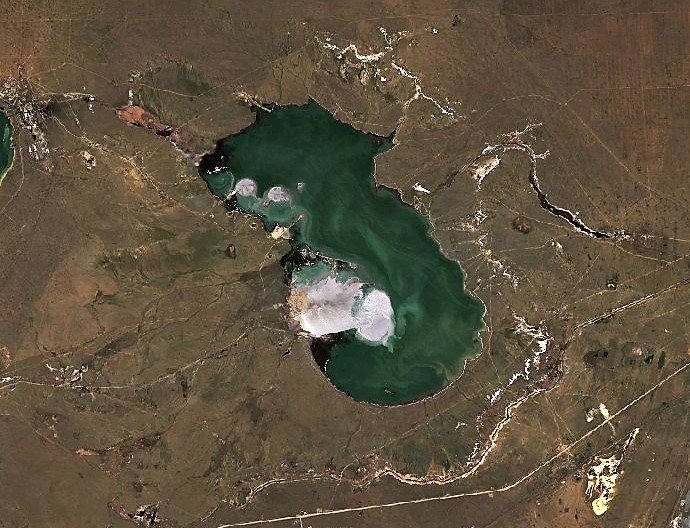
- Sentinel-2 image of the lake. The white spots are ashes from the nearby power plants.

- Location within Kazakhstan
- Location: Ekibastuz City Administration
- Coordinates: 51°57′58″N 75°41′44″E
- Type: endorheic
- Primary inflows: Bala tunnik
- Catchment area: 8,750 square kilometers (3,380 sq mi)
- Basin countries: Kazakhstan
- Max. length: 17.2 kilometers (10.7 mi)
- Max. width: 7.5 kilometers (4.7 mi)
- Surface area: 44.3 square kilometers (17.1 sq mi)
- Max. depth: 5 meters (16 ft)
- Residence time: UTC+6
- Shore length^{1}: 78.7 kilometers (48.9 mi)
- Surface elevation: 70 meters (230 ft)
- ^{1} Shore length is not a well-defined measure.

Karasor (Kazakh: Қарасор; Russian: Карасор) is a salt lake in the Ekibastuz City Administration, Pavlodar Region, Kazakhstan.

Karasor is the largest of the lakes in the area surrounding Ekibastuz. It is located 25 kilometers (16 mi) to the northeast of the city and 15 kilometers (9.3 mi) to the west of Kalkaman.

== Geography ==
Karasor is an endorheic lake in the Irtysh Basin. It stretches from southeast to northwest for roughly 17 kilometers (11 mi) and is about 7.5 kilometers (4.7 mi) wide. Smaller lake Shandaksor, with the Ekibastuz GRES-2 Power Station rising by its eastern shore, lies 8 kilometers (5.0 mi) to the west of the northwestern corner, and Zhyngyldy, with the Ekibastuz GRES-1 Power Station by its northern shore, lies 17 kilometers (11 mi) to the WSW of the southwestern lakeshore. Other lakes in the vicinity are Tuzdysor, located 9 kilometers (5.6 mi) to the northwest, Kudaikol 12 kilometers (7.5 mi) to the southeast, Atygay 15 kilometers (9.3 mi) to the SSW, and Shureksor 17 kilometers (11 mi) to the north.

The Bala Tundik river flows into Karasor. The lake is fed by snow and rain. Karasor usually freezes in November and thaws in April. The lakeshores are flat and the surrounding area is used for local livestock grazing. There are also some cultivated fields.

== Ash dumping ==
Large quantities of ash are dumped into lake Karasor by the two neighboring power plants. The accumulation of dumped ashes in the southern part of the lake forms an island or peninsula with an average diameter of 2.5 kilometers (1.6 mi). The ashes are collected by people of the neighboring villages in order to sell them to be recycled for the industrial production of aluminosilicate microparticles.

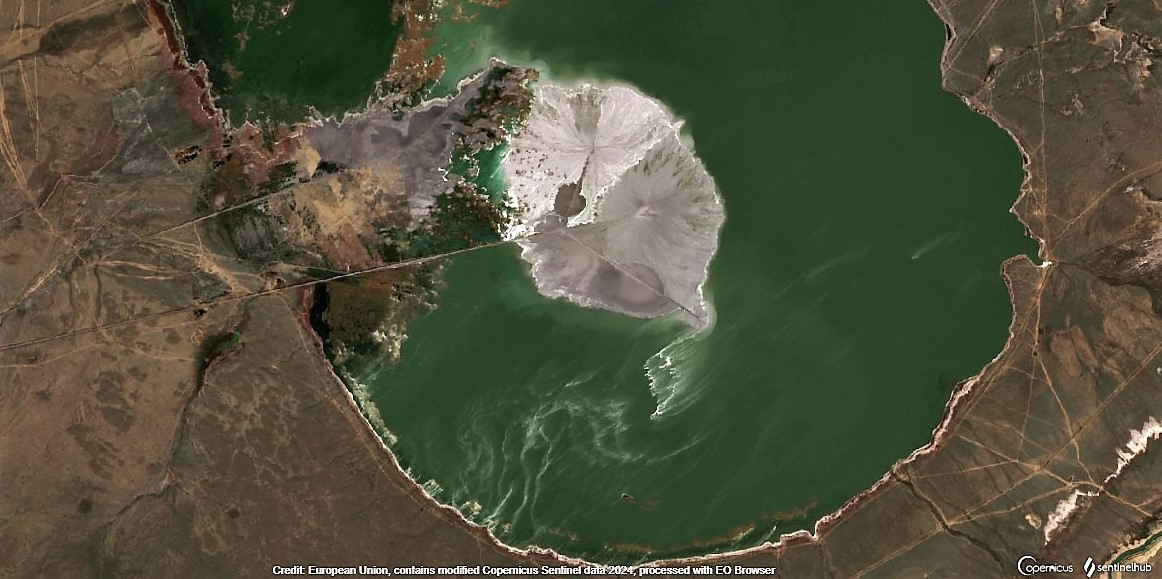
Ash dump in Karasor SW lakeshore Sentinel-2 image.

== See also ==
- List of lakes of Kazakhstan
