= Bylkyldak (lake) =

Lake in Kazakhstan

- Былқылдақ
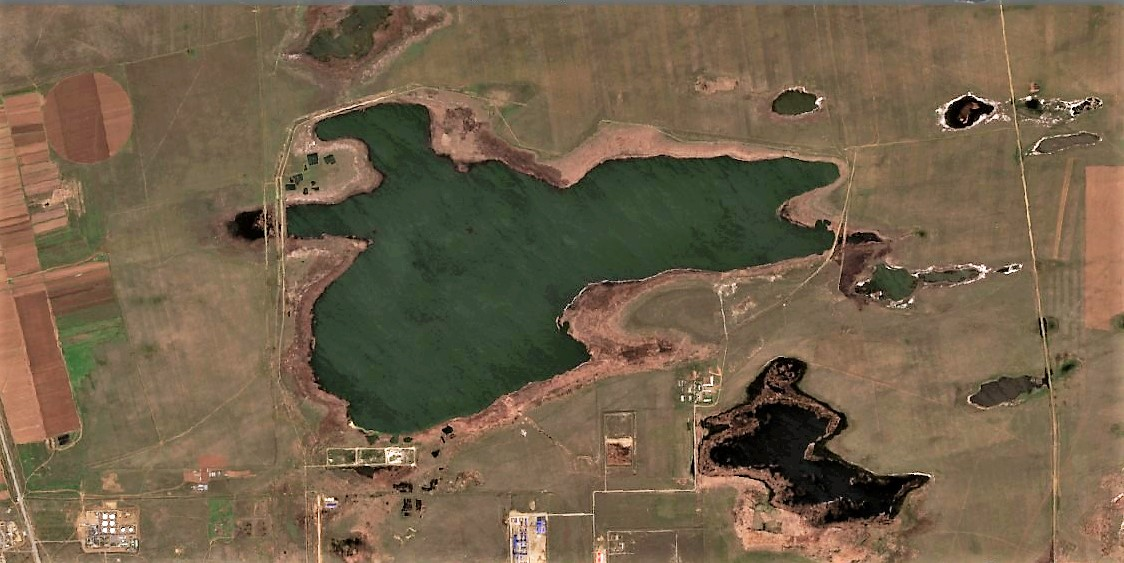
- Sentinel-2 picture of the lake

- Location within Kazakhstan
- Location: Kulunda Plain
- Coordinates: 52°25′34″N 76°56′49″E
- Type: Salt lake
- Basin countries: Kazakhstan
- Max. length: 7.2 kilometers (4.5 mi)
- Max. width: 3.6 kilometers (2.2 mi)
- Surface area: 10 square kilometers (3.9 sq mi)
- Residence time: UTC+6
- Surface elevation: 92 meters (302 ft)
- Settlements: Pavlodar

Bylkyldak (Kazakh: Былқылдақ; Russian: былкылдак), also known as Balkyldak is a salt lake in Pavlodar District, Pavlodar Region, Kazakhstan.

The lake lies within an industrial zone 11 kilometers (6.8 mi) to the north of Pavlodar town.

== Geography ==
Bylkyldak is a natural lake part of the Irtysh basin. It lies in a tectonic depression of the Kulunda Plain, 6 kilometers (3.7 mi) to the east of the course of the Irtysh. Bylkyldak is surrounded by cultivated fields and small sectors of steppe vegetation. Lake Koryakovka is located 8.5 kilometers (5.3 mi) to the east.

The lake was used as a reservoir by a chlor-alkali plant built in 1973 at the time of the Kazakh SSR which operated until 1993. Nowadays the sediments of the lake are highly contaminated with mercury. A clay wall was built along the western shore to prevent the polluted Bylkyldak water to reach the oxbow lakes of the Irtysh to the west. Close to the northeast there is an artificial reservoir.

== Ecology ==
Despite warnings from environmentalists, the lake is used by local people for swimming in the summer. Fish caught in Bylkyldak, such as dace, tench and crucian carp are heavily contaminated with mercury, but they are eaten by locals. The lake is also visited by wild ducks, which are hunted and consumed by local people as well.

== See also ==
- List of lakes of Kazakhstan
- Atygay (lake)
