= Koryakovka (lake) =

Lake in Kazakhstan

- Коряковка
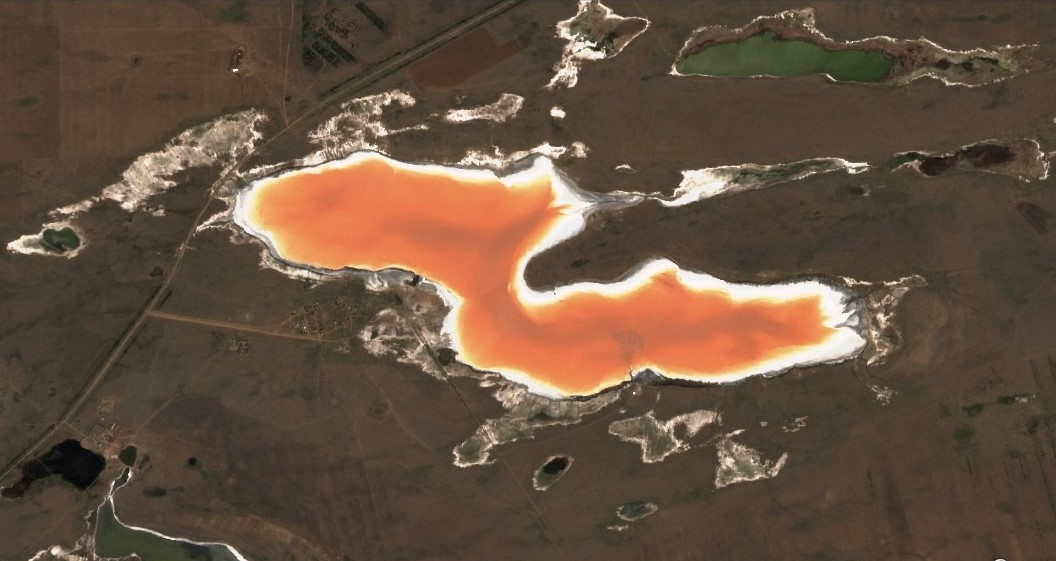
- Sentinel-2 picture of the lake

- Location within Kazakhstan
- Location: Kulunda Plain
- Coordinates: 52°25′00″N 77°10′00″E
- Type: Salt lake
- Basin countries: Kazakhstan
- Max. length: 7.4 kilometers (4.6 mi)
- Max. width: 1.5 kilometers (0.93 mi)
- Surface area: 11 square kilometers (4.2 sq mi)
- Residence time: UTC+6
- Surface elevation: 94.4 meters (310 ft)
- Settlements: Pavlodar

Koryakovka (Kazakh: Коряковка) is a salt lake in Pavlodar District, Pavlodar Region, Kazakhstan.

The lake lies 13 kilometers (8.1 mi) to the northeast of Pavlodar town. Koryakovka village lies close to the southern lakeshore.

== Geography ==
Koryakovka lake is part of the Irtysh basin. It lies in a tectonic depression of the Kulunda Plain, 20 kilometers (12 mi) to the east of the course of the Irtysh. Lake Bylkyldak lies 8.5 kilometers (5.3 mi) to the west, Maraldy 36 kilometers (22 mi) to the ESE, and Ulken Tobylzhan 36 kilometers (22 mi) to the ENE.

The lake usually dries in the summer season. When it has water it generally has a pink tint. The shore is flat. The water of the lake is highly saline. Table salt has been mined at lake Koryakovka since the late 18th century.

== Flora and fauna ==
The lake is surrounded by steppe vegetation, including fescue, feathergrass and wormwood. Among the birds that may be found at the Koryakovka lakeshore, sandpipers and ducks deserve mention.

== See also ==
- List of lakes of Kazakhstan
- Pink lake
