= Altybaysor =

Lake in the country of Kazakhstan

- Алтыбайсор
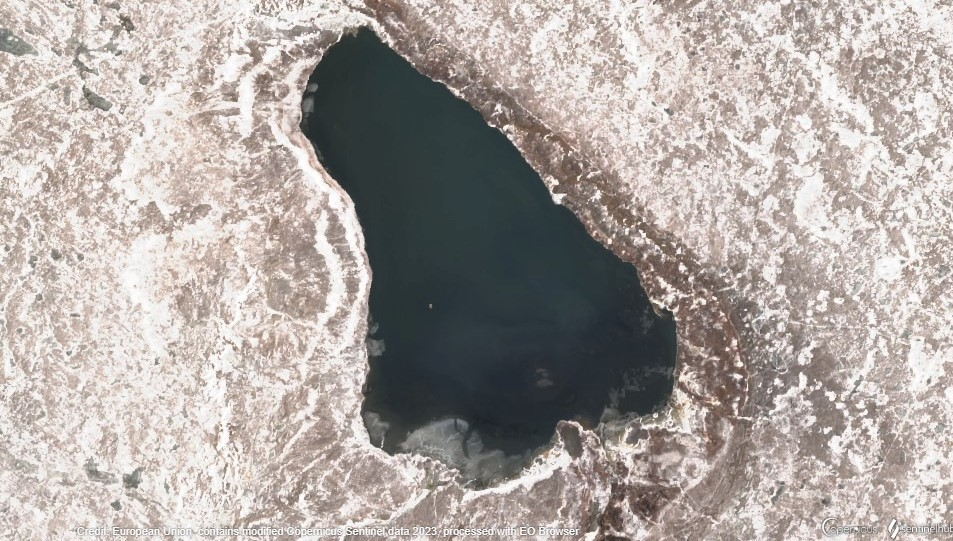
- Sentinel-2 picture of the lake in September

- Location within Kazakhstan
- Location: Aksu City Administration
- Coordinates: 51°34′38″N 76°36′18″E
- Type: endorheic lake
- Basin countries: Kazakhstan
- Max. length: 6.2 kilometers (3.9 mi)
- Max. width: 3.7 kilometers (2.3 mi)
- Surface area: 13.6 square kilometers (5.3 sq mi)
- Residence time: UTC+6:00
- Surface elevation: 110 meters (360 ft)

Altybaysor (Kazakh: Алтыбайсор) is a salt lake in the Aksu City Administration, Pavlodar Region, Kazakhstan.

The lake lies 60 kilometers (37 mi) to the SSW of Aksu city. The area surrounding the lake is used for livestock grazing.

== Geography ==
Altybaysor is an endorheic lake of the northern end of the Kazakh Uplands at an elevation of 110 meters (360 ft). The Irtysh flows 50 kilometers (31 mi) to the east of the eastern shores of the lake.

There are a number of smaller lakes in its vicinity, such as Zhamantuz (Aksu City Administration) 23 kilometers (14 mi) to the northwest, Zhamantuz (May District) 47 kilometers (29 mi) to the SSE, Batyrsha 11 kilometers (6.8 mi) to the west and Bozshasor 4 kilometers (2.5 mi) to the south. Alkamergen lies 39 kilometers (24 mi) to the south.

== See also ==
- Sor (geomorphology)
