= Aksu, Pavlodar Region =

Aksu Ақсу
- city
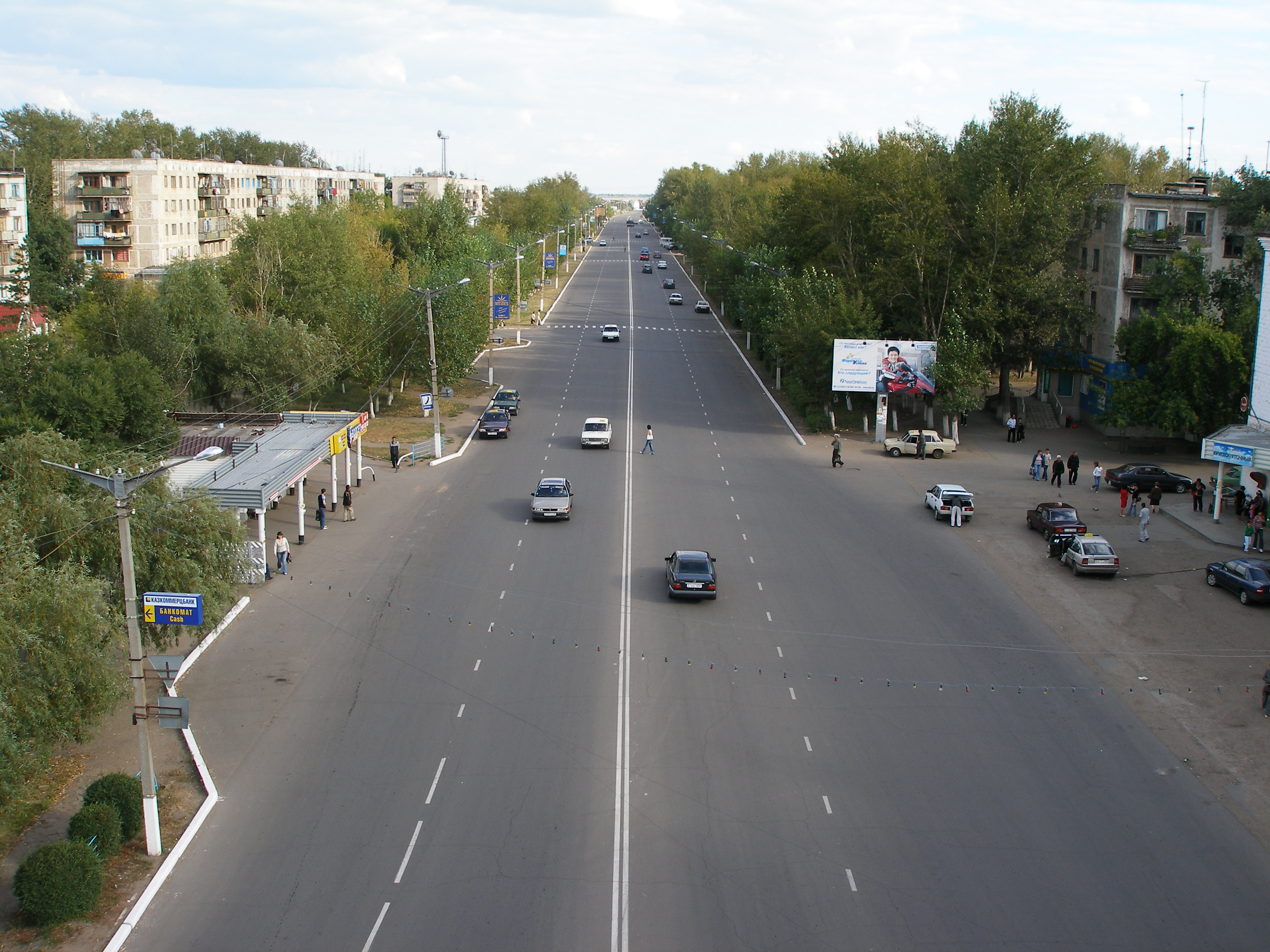

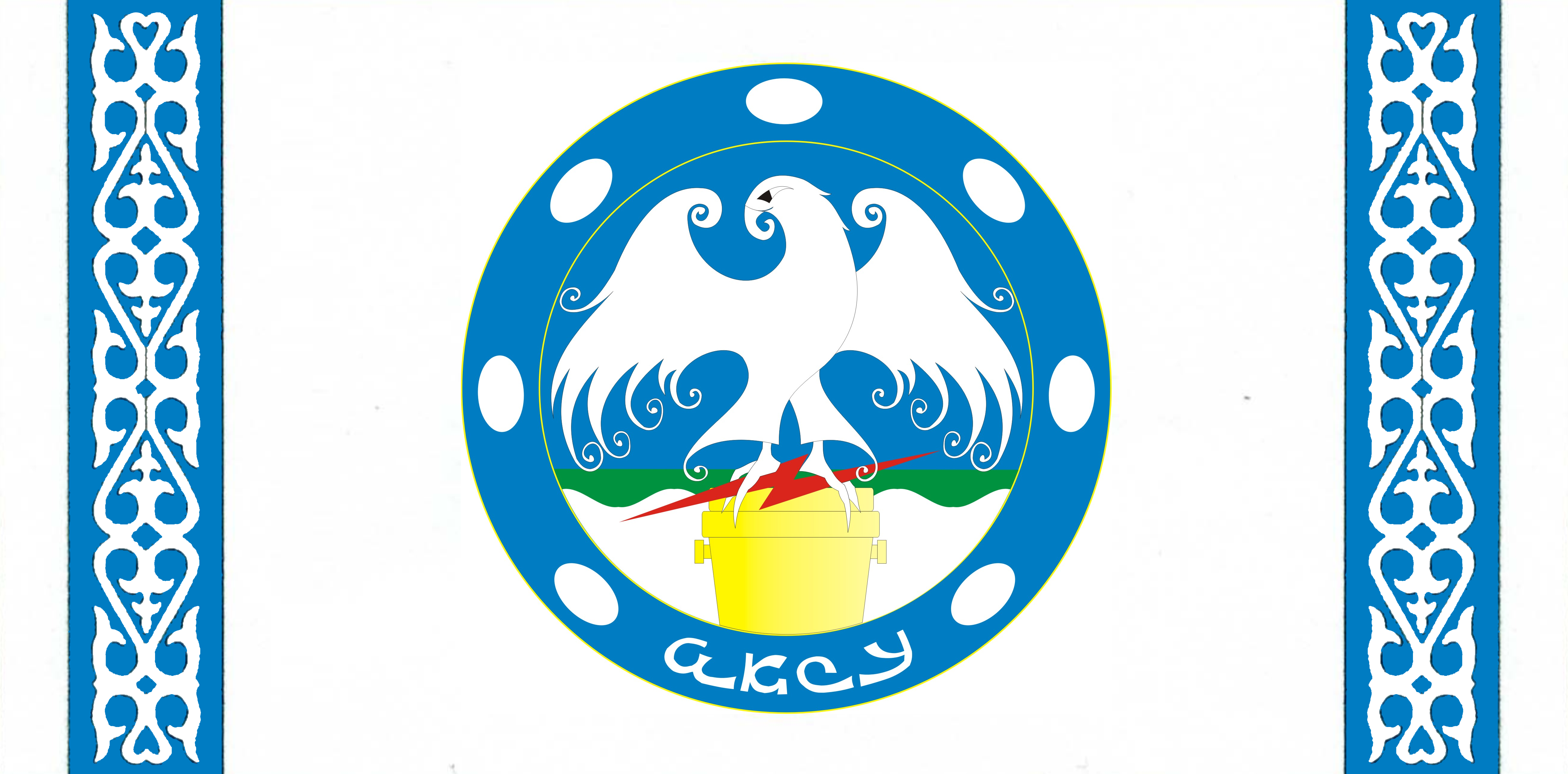
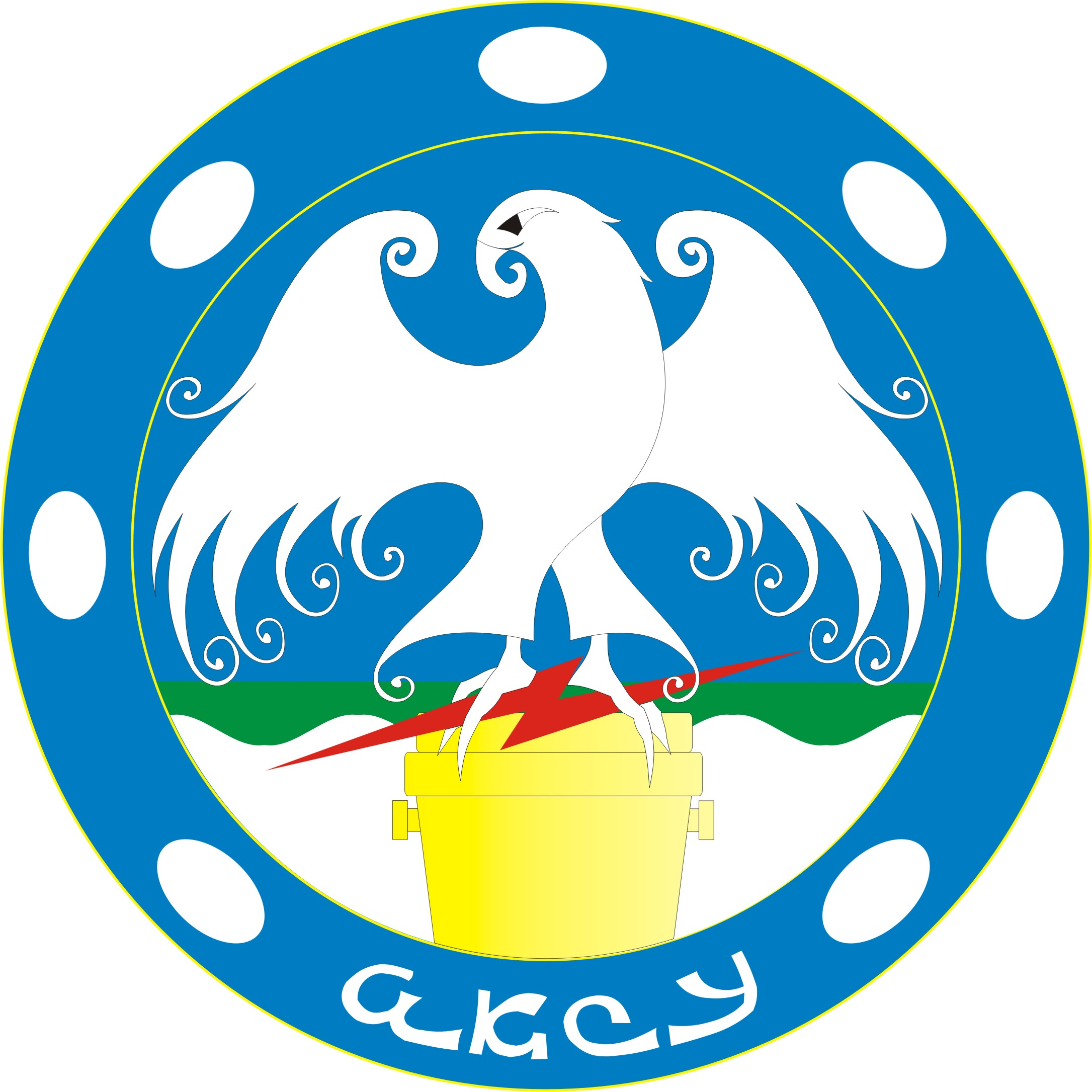
- Flag Seal

- Location in Kazakhstan Aksu (Asia)
- Coordinates: 52°02′0″N 76°55′0″E
- Country: Kazakhstan
- Region: Pavlodar Region
- City administration: Aksu City Administration

Government
  - Akim: Nurlan Shaikhslyamovich Dyusimbinov

Area
  - Total: 20 km^{2} (7.7 sq mi)

Population (2013)
  - Total: 69,354
- Climate: Dfb

Aksu (Kazakh: Ақсу, Aqsu), literally meaning the white river, formerly known as Yermak (Russian: Ермак, until 1993), is a city in Pavlodar Region, in north-eastern Kazakhstan. The population of the municipal area is 67,665 (2009 census results); 73,165 (1999 census results). and the population of the town 41,677 (2009 census results); 42,264 (1999 census results).

== Geography ==
Aksu is located 50 kilometers (31 mi) to the south of Pavlodar, the administrative center of the region. The city lies on the left bank of the Irtysh River. The territory of the Aksu City Administration borders Aktogay District in the north, Bayanaul District, May District and Akkuly District in the south, Pavlodar District in the west, and the Ekibastuz City Administration in the east. Lake Altybaysor is located within the Aksu municipal limits.

== History ==
The history of former Yermak is related to discovery of coal deposits in the vicinity of Ekibastuz. In 1897, construction of a 110 kilometers (68 mi) railroad from Ekibastuz commenced. The Voskresensk railroad crossed the area of the future town. A wharf was erected where the railroad reached the Irtysh River, and two settlements appeared: an administrative settlement and a workers settlement. The newcomers had to build their houses using local materials: clay, reed and thatch. In this way, at the turn of the 20th century a small village made of wattle-and-daub houses arose close to Kazakh Aul No. 5 in the Kyzyl-Shyrpy Stow. The village was known under the name of Glinka (from Russian 'глинка' – clay). The population of Glinka gradually increased, most intensively after the riots of 1906, when out-migrants poured into the Kazakh and Siberian steppe.

In 1911, the population of the workers settlement reached 1000. In 1913, by an order of the Governor of the Steppe Krai, Glinka was renamed as Yermak in memory of Yermak Timofeyevich, the 16th-century Russian conqueror of Western Siberia. Both the Voskresensk Wharf and the Glinka village became parts of what was now called the Yermak settlement.

1917 brought new administration to Yermak. The first kommissar of the Ekibastuz Soviet, Stepan Tsaryov was murdered by rioters in Yermak, in the railway station square.

The Soviet power was firmly established in Yermak in November 1919, following the creation of the Pavlodar Soviet of People's Commissars. Until 1922, Yermak was a volost centre of the Pavlodar Uezd. According to the census, Yermak had 1289 inhabitants. In 1938, Kaganovich District was formed with its capital in Yermak.

Decree of the Praesidium of the Supreme Soviet of Kazakh SSR dated October 23, 1961, granted the Yermak settlement the status of a town.

In the 1960s, Yermak became the starting point of the Irtysh–Karaganda Canal, which takes water from one of the branches of the Irtysh at 51°59′38″N 76°59′27″E,

By Decree No. TN 2189-ХП of the Praesidium of the Supreme Council of the Republic of Kazakhstan dated May 4, 1993, the town of Yermak was renamed the city of Aksu.

== Industries ==
Aksu today is an agroindustrial municipality in Pavlodar Region.

Municipality population is about 70.000, including over 29.000 of rural population. The local economic mainstay is represented by the Aksu Ferroalloys Plant and a power plant owned by OJSC Eurasian Power Corporation.

Construction of a coal-fired electric power plant commenced in 1960; its first CEO was Vladimir Novik. The first 300MW unit was commissioned on December 17, 1968. In December 1996, the enterprise was restructured into an open joint stock company, Eurasian Power Corporation (ОАО Евроазиатская энергетическая корпорация).

Construction of the facilities of the ferroalloys plant started in 1962. In January 1968, the first ton of ferroalloys was produced at the plant, and in July 1970, eight furnaces were commissioned in Workshop No. 2. The first CEO of the Yermak Ferroalloys Plant was Pyotr Topilsky. In 1995, the enterprise merged into the Kazkhrom Transnational Company.

6 religious associations operate in Aqsu, including a mosque, an orthodox church, Seventh-Day Adventists church, Evangelical Christian Baptists congregation.

50 educational institutions – 27 schools, vocational school No. 3, vocational school No. 19, Kazakh language upper secondary school, school-licee, and 11 elementary ungraded schools; 3 out-of-school institutions: Children's Creativity Center, art school, and young naturalists senter; 6 day care centers; Zhayau Musa College; a branch of Pavlodar private university.

Aksu has a central library with over 78.000 books.

Aksu health care institutions include Aksu Central Hospital, Kalkaman village hospital, TB dispensary, ambulance station, 11 rural outpatient clinics, including one private clinic.

Aksu enjoys a swimming pool, a sports and recreation center, a 5000-seat stadium, and a youth sports school.

== Notable people from Aksu ==
- Imanbek, EDM musician and DJ, Grammy award winner, best known for remixing the song "Roses" by Saint Jhn
