= Atygay (village) =

Village in Pavlodar Region, Kazakhstan

Atygay Атығай
- Village
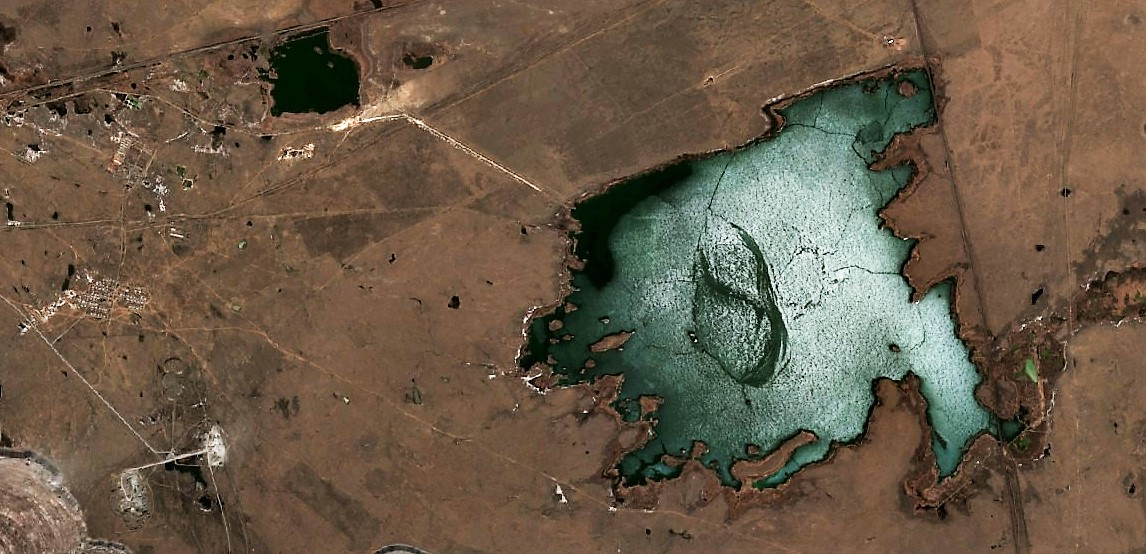
- Atygay on the left Sentinel-2 image

- Location in Kazakhstan
- Coordinates: 51°44′53″N 75°29′20″E
- Country: Kazakhstan
- Region: Pavlodar Region
- City administration: Ekibastuz City Administration
- Rural District: Bayet Rural District
- Established: 2012

Population (2021)
  - Total: 577
- Time zone: UTC+5

Atygay (Kazakh: Атығай; Russian: Атыгай) is a village in the Ekibastuz City Administration, Pavlodar Region, Kazakhstan. It is part of the Bayet Rural District.

The village was established on 31 March 2012.

== Geography ==
Atygay is located 6 km (3.7 mi) east of Ekibastuz city. It lies 4 km (2.5 mi) to the west of the lake of the same name.
