= Kalkaman =

Village in Pavlodar Region, Kazakhstan

Kalkaman Қалқаман
- Village
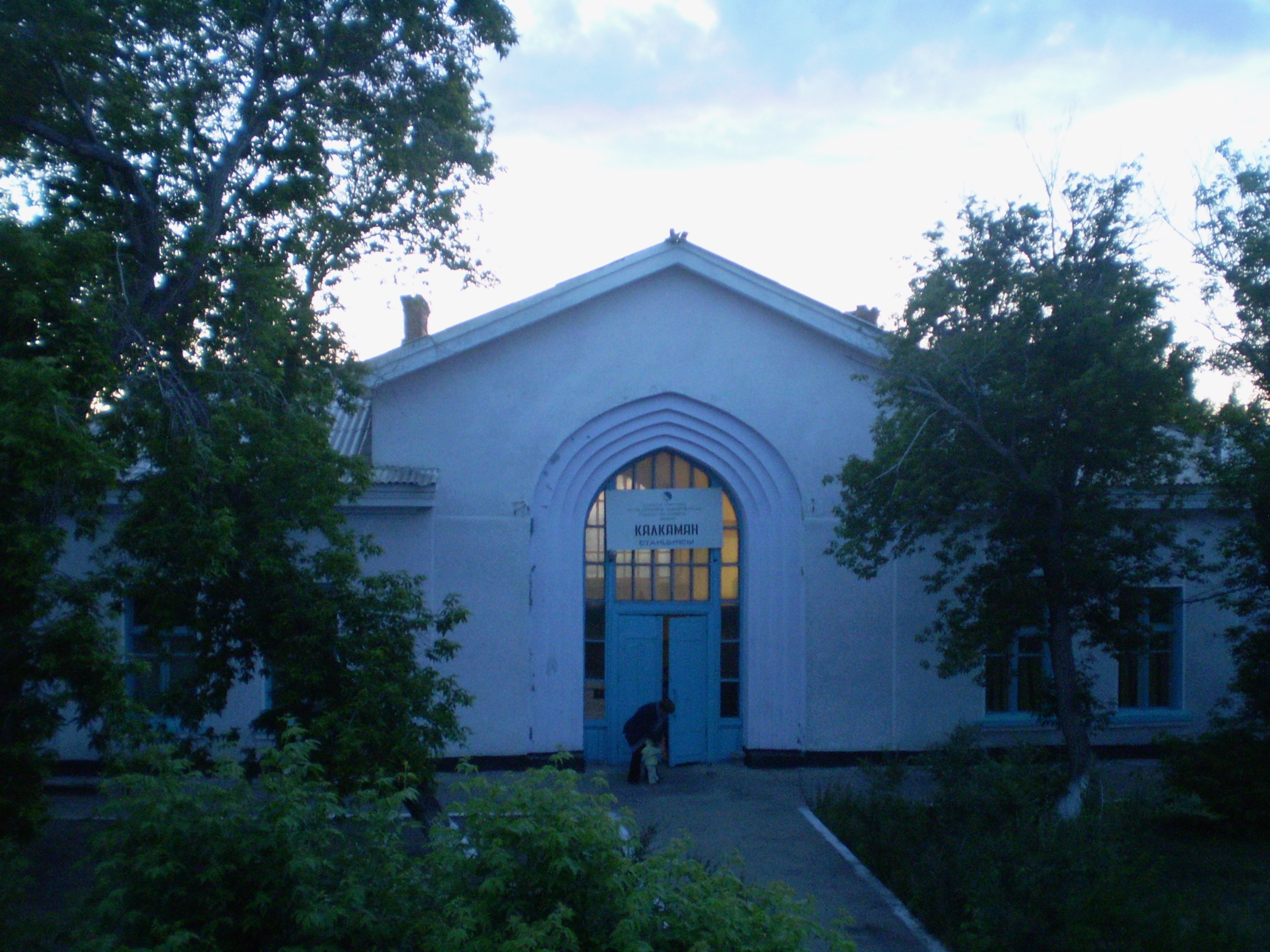
- Kalkaman railway station

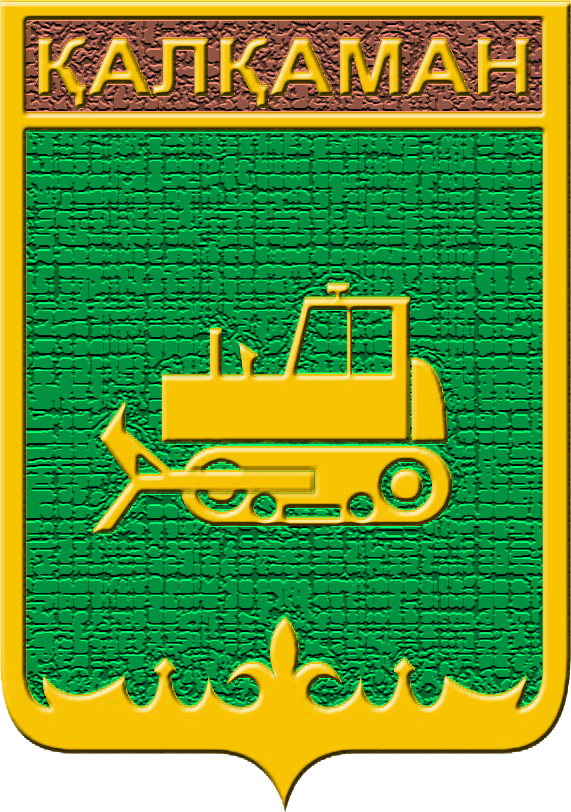
- Seal

- Location in Kazakhstan
- Coordinates: 51°57′09″N 76°01′16″E
- Country: Kazakhstan
- Region: Pavlodar Region
- City administration: Aksu City Administration

Population (2009)
  - Total: 3,145
- Time zone: UTC+6 (Omsk Time)
- Postcode: 140110

Kalkaman (Kazakh: Қалқаман) is a village in the Aksu City Administration, Pavlodar Region, Kazakhstan. It is the center of Kalkaman Rural District (KATO code - 551655100). Population: 3,145 (2009 census results); 4,286 (1999 census results).

== Geography ==
Kalkaman is located 66 km (41 mi) west of Aksu City, to the east of Ekibastuz. It lies near lakes Kudaikol and Karasor, at the intersection of the Irtysh–Karaganda Canal and the Astana - Pavlodar railway. The village has a railway station.
