= Kalkaman (lake) =

Lake in Kazakhstan

- Қалқаман
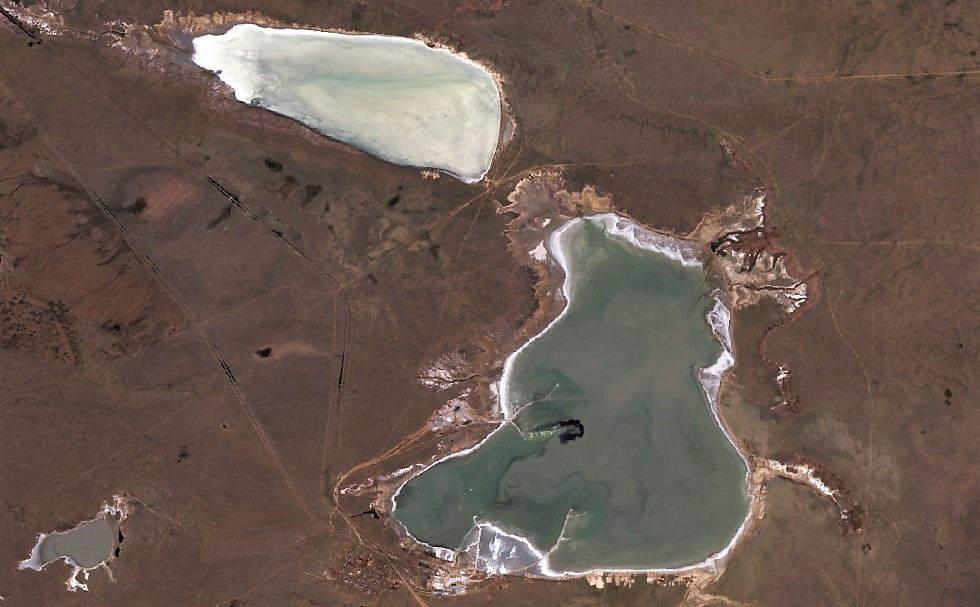
- Sentinel-2 image of the lakes

- Location within Kazakhstan
- Location: Aksu City Administration
- Coordinates: 52°02′02″N 76°32′58″E
- Type: endorheic
- Basin countries: Kazakhstan
- Max. length: 4.9 kilometers (3.0 mi)
- Max. width: 3.6 kilometers (2.2 mi)
- Surface area: 12.6 square kilometers (4.9 sq mi)
- Average depth: 0.6 meters (2 ft 0 in)
- Max. depth: 0.8 meters (2 ft 7 in)
- Residence time: UTC+6
- Shore length^{1}: 16.6 kilometers (10.3 mi)
- Surface elevation: 108.6 meters (356 ft)
- ^{1} Shore length is not a well-defined measure.

Kalkaman (Kazakh: Қалқаман), also known as Kalkamantuz (Kazakh: Қалқамантұз), are two salt lakes in the Aksu City Administration, Pavlodar Region, Kazakhstan.

The Kalkaman lakes are located 22 kilometers (14 mi) to the WSW of Aksu City and 33 kilometers (21 mi) to the ENE of Kalkaman village. The nearest village is Pogranichnik 5 kilometers (3.1 mi) to the NW. Yevgenyevka lies 13 kilometers (8.1 mi) to the ESE.

There is commercial extraction of salt from the lakes. Some of the salt is exported to Western Siberia.

== Geography ==
Kalkaman is a system of two endorheic lakes in the Irtysh Basin. The lakes lie at an elevation of 108.6 meters (356 ft). The area around the lakeshores is used as pasture for local cattle.

- Ulken Kalkaman (Russian: Большой Калкаман, Bolshoy Kalkaman) is the larger lake in the southeast. It stretches from north to south for almost 5 kilometers (3.1 mi) and is about 3 kilometers (1.9 mi) wide. The western shore is flat, while the northern, eastern and southern sides have steep between 5 meters (16 ft) and 6 meters (20 ft) high cliffs. The Irtysh flows 26 kilometers (16 mi) to the east of the eastern shores of the lake.
- Kishi Kalkaman (Russian: Малый Калкаман, Maly Kalkaman) is the smaller and elongated lake in the northwest. It stretches roughly from northwest to southeast for 4.1 kilometers (2.5 mi) and is about 1.3 kilometers (0.81 mi) wide. The A17 Highway passes 5 kilometers (3.1 mi) to the northwest of the western end of the lake.

== See also ==
- List of lakes of Kazakhstan
