= Kokozek, Urzhar District =

Kokozek Кокозек
- Location in Kazakhstan
- Coordinates: 47°08′39″N 81°53′32″E
- Country: Kazakhstan
- Region: Abai Region
- District: Urzhar District

Population (2009)
  - Total: 1,413
- Time zone: UTC+6 (Omsk Time)

Urzhar (Kazakh: Кокозек, until 1998 - Irinovka) is a village in Urzhar District, Abai Region, Kazakhstan. Population: 1,413 (2009 census results); 1,731 (1999 census results).
