= Kokozek, Bayzak District =

Kokozek
- village
- Location within Kazakhstan
- Coordinates: 43°10′19″N 71°39′54″E
- Country: Kazakhstan
- Region: Jambyl Region
- District: Bayzak District
- Elevation: 491 m (1,611 ft)

Population (2009)
  - Total: 774
- Time zone: UTC+7

Kokozek (Kazakh: Көкөзек) is a village in Bayzak District, Jambyl Region, Kazakhstan. It is part of the Sukhanbaev Rural District, KATO code - 313647400. Population: 774 (2009 census results); 839 (1999 census results).
