= Pavlodar District =

Coordinates: 52°18′N 76°57′E

Pavlodar
- District
- Павлодар ауданы
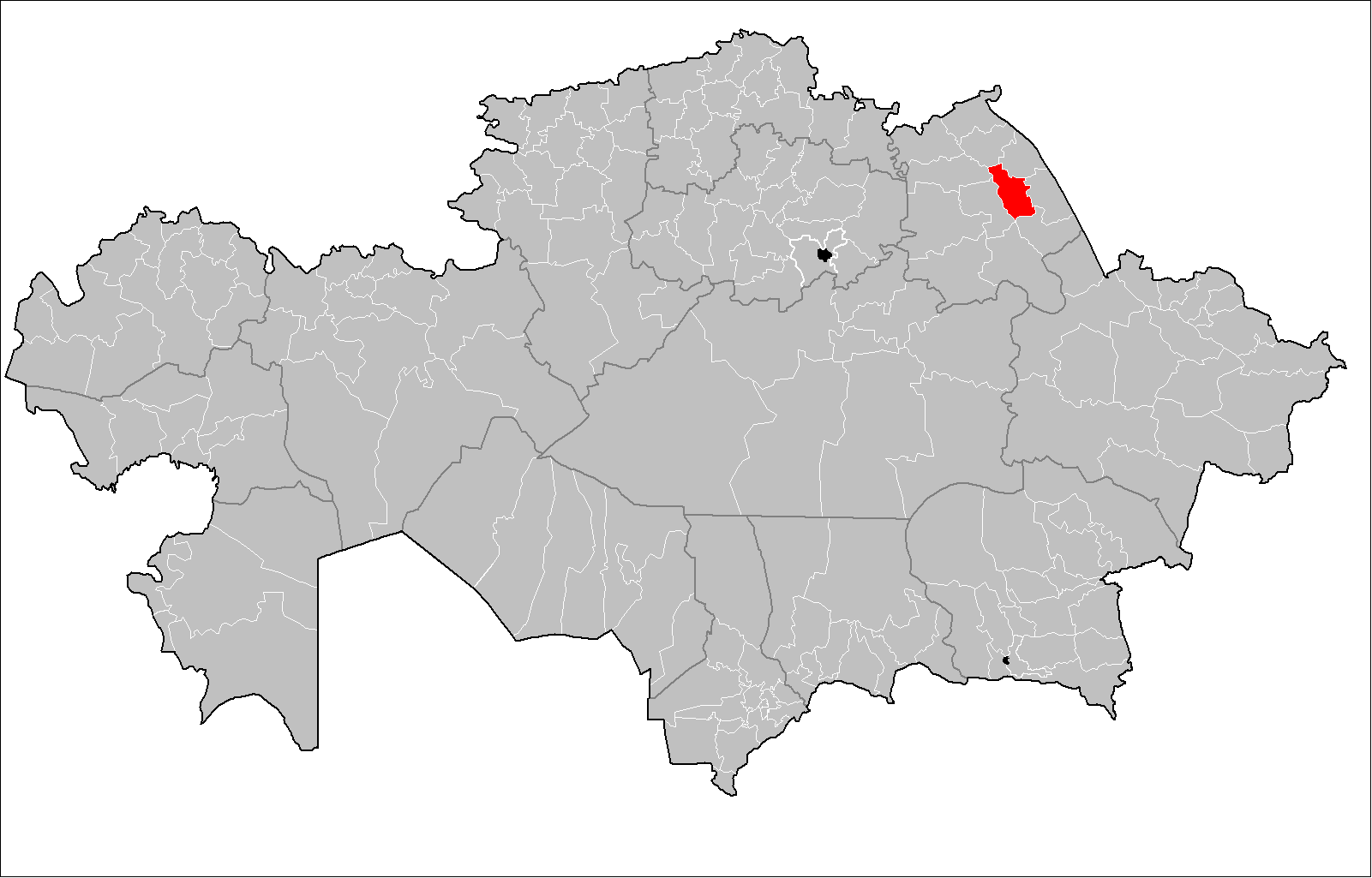
- Country: Kazakhstan
- Region: Pavlodar Region
- Administrative center: Pavlodar
- Founded: 1928

Government
  - Akim (mayor): Nikolay Dychko

Area
  - Total: 2,400 sq mi (6,100 km^{2})

Population (2013)
  - Total: 28,638
- Time zone: UTC+6 (East)

Pavlodar (Kazakh: Павлодар ауданы, Pavlodar audany) is a district of Pavlodar Region in northern Kazakhstan. The administrative center of the district is the city of Pavlodar. Population: 28,638 (2013 estimate); 28,855 (2009 census results); 32,302 (1999 census results).

== Geography ==
Lakes Koryakovka, Bylkyldak and the western part of lake Maraldy are located in the district.
