= Ekibastuz GRES-1 =

Coal-fired thermal power station (GRES) at Ekibastusz, Kazakhstan

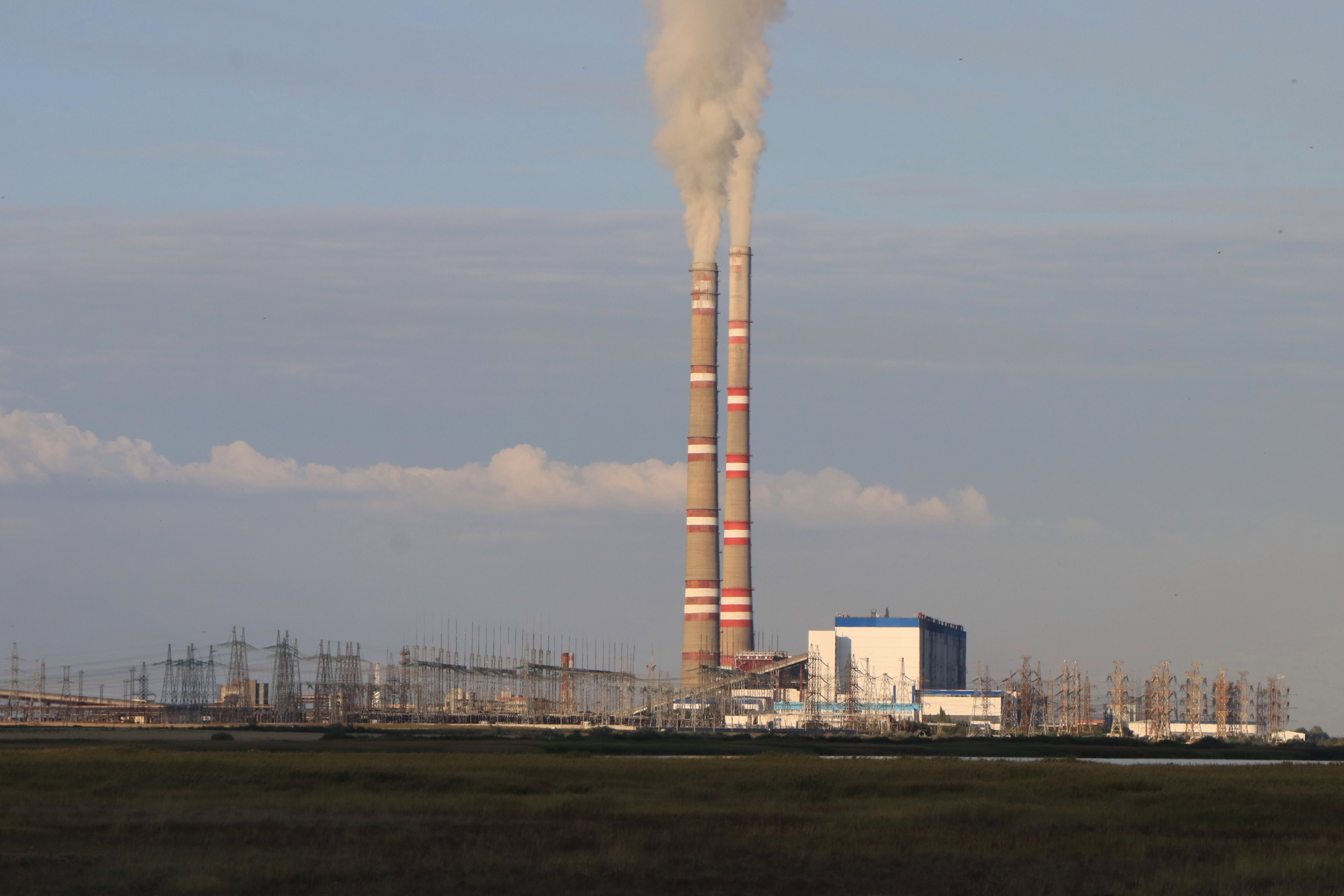
- Country: Kazakhstan
- Location: Ekibastuz
- Coordinates: 51°53′11″N 75°22′36″E
- Status: Operational
- Commission date: 1980
- Owners: Kazakhmys, Samruk-Kazyna

Thermal power station
- Primary fuel: Coal

Power generation
- Units operational: 8
- Nameplate capacity: 4,000 MW

External links
- Website: gres1.kz
- Commons: Related media on Commons

Ekibastuz GRES-1 (also known as: AES-Ekibastuz) is a 4,000 MW coal-fired thermal power station (GRES) at Ekibastusz, Kazakhstan. It is located by lake Zhyngyldy. The ashes of the station are dumped into nearby lake Karasor. GRES-1 has two 330-metre (1,083 ft) tall chimneys. As of June 2010, the Ekibastuz GRES-1 power station was the largest power station in Kazakhstan, and generated 13% of the nation's electricity.

== History ==
Most of the units were launched into service in the early 1980s. In January, 1996, due to mismanagement and disrepair, the capacity of the station dropped from 1,624 to 1,025 MWe, and further dropped to 655 MWe by June, 1996. Work at the station became hazardous: the equipment was not maintained, most of the control and emergency handling instrumentation was stolen from the power station. The units had to be frequently stopped because of break downs.

From 1996 until 2008, the power station was owned by U.S.-based AES Corporation. By November, 1997, only three units were operational, producing 800 MWe on average. In the spring of 1998, all units except one were idle. The customers owed the power station about US$150 million of unpaid tariffs. In 1999, the average produced power was 215 MWe. In 2000, it was increased to 317 MWe after much needed repairs. As a result, the power station's generating capacity was increased from 1,050 to 1,200 MWe, but the problem of finding paying customers still resulted in low production levels.

On 4 February 2008, AES agreed to sell the AES Ekibastuz power station to Kazakhmys. Under the terms of the management agreement AES continued to operate the station until December 2010.

On 10 December 2009, Kazakhmys PLC announced that it would be selling a 50% stake in the power station to the National Welfare Fund Samruk-Kazyna for US$681 million. The transaction was completed on 26 February 2010. Kazakhmys and Samruk-Kazyna will create a joint supervisory board, and management positions will alternate between Kazakhmys and Samruk-Kazyna every five years. In the first five years following the transaction, Kazakhmys will appoint the management team whilst Samruk-Kazyna will appoint several key oversight positions. Over the next seven years the parties pledged to provide investment of around $1 billion at Ekibastuz, to upgrade the power station and restore it from its current capacity of 2,500 MW to its original nameplate capacity of 4,000 MW.

In June 2010, a pair of contracts were announced with Emerson Electric Company to refurbish many of the control systems on units 3 through 8. This is estimated to take 5 years to complete and is expected to increase the efficiency of the affected units at the power station.

== Individual units ==
Each of the eight units has a nameplate generating capacity of 500 MWe.

Unit 1 was launched into service in March, 1980.
Unit 2 was launched into service in October, 1980.
Unit 3 was launched into service in February, 1981.
Unit 4 was launched into service in November, 1981.
Unit 5 was launched into service in October, 1982.
Unit 6 was launched into service in May, 1983.
Unit 7 was launched into service in October, 1983.
Unit 8 Out of service until 2012 pending retrofit.

== See also ==
- GRES-2 Power Station
