= Kokozek, Karasay District =

Kokozek
- Village
- Location in Kazakhstan
- Coordinates: 43°20′51″N 76°46′05″E
- Country: Kazakhstan
- Region: Almaty Region
- District: Karasay District
- Time zone: UTC+6 (Omsk Time)

Kokozek is a village in Karasay District, Almaty Region, south-eastern Kazakhstan.
