= Irtysh–Karaganda Canal =

Canal in Kazakhstan

Irtysh–Karaganda Canal Ертіс-Қарағанды каналы
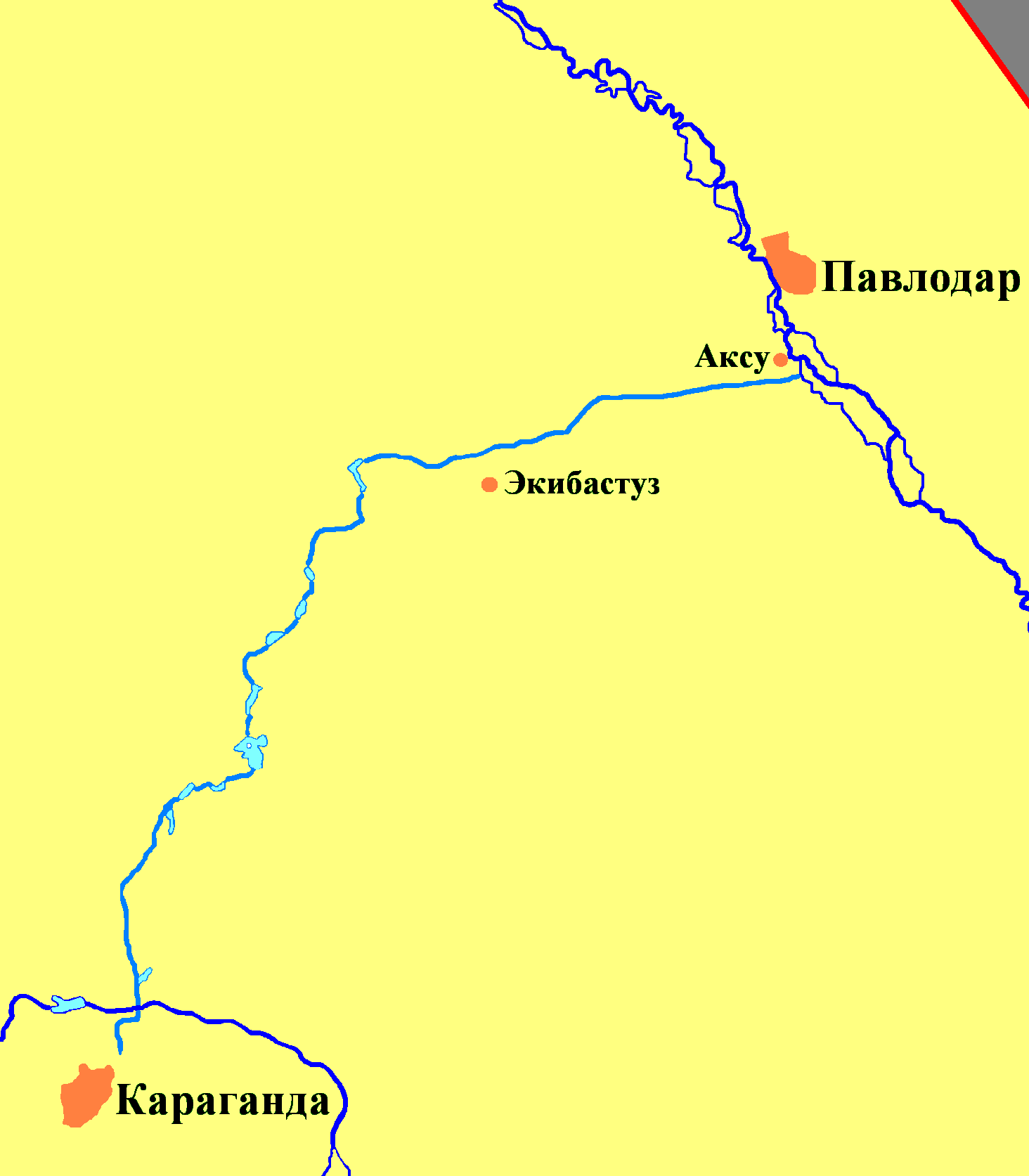
- Interactive map of Irtysh–Karaganda Canal; Ертіс-Қарағанды каналы

Specifications
- Length: 451 km (280 miles)

History
- Construction began: 1962; 64 years ago
- Date completed: 1974; 52 years ago

Geography
- Start point: Near Aksu
- End point: Karaganda

The Irtysh–Karaganda Canal (Kazakh: Ертіс-Қарағанды каналы, Ertıs-Qarağandy kanaly; Russian: Канал Иртыш — Караганда) is an irrigation canal in Kazakhstan. It connects the Irtysh River with Karaganda (Qaraghandy), a major industrial center in north-central Kazakhstan. After Kazakhstan's independence, the canal was officially renamed as the Kanysh Satpayev Canal (Russian: Канал имени Каныша Сатпаева) after the Kazakh geologist Kanysh Satpayev.

== Description ==
The canal starts at 51°59′38″N 76°59′27″E, just south of the city of Aksu (formerly Yermak), where it takes water from one of the branches of the Irtysh River. It runs for 451 km in the general western, south-western, and southern direction. It reaches an industrial area on the north-eastern outskirts of Karaganda at 49°58′22″N 73°15′49″E (Kokpekti District), at which point its water apparently goes into an underground pipeline.

On its route, the canal passes through numerous reservoirs (the Ekibastuz Reservoir (51°49′00″N 75°13′00″E, about 10 km north of Ekibastuz), as well as other reservoirs at 51°48′00″N 74°38′00″E, 51°28′00″N 74°21′00″E, etc.).

The canal crosses the Nura River at 50°5′26″N 73°22′40″E, in what appears to be a tunnel. Some of the canal's water is directed into the Nura (a chute below the dam at 50°5′30″N 73°22′37″E), replenishing this river.

As Karaganda is located at a higher elevation than the Irtysh, the canal is furnished with 22 pumping stations, raising the water by 475 m in total.

== History ==
The construction of the canal started in 1962. It was put to use by 1968 and fully completed by 1974.

In the early 21st century, a pipeline was built from the canal to the Ishim River, to supply Kazakhstan's capital, Astana with water.

As of 2013, proposals are floated in Kazakhstan about either extending the Irtysh–Karaganda Canal all the way to the Ishim River upstream of Astana or building a new canal between the Irtysh and Astana.

According to a report published in 2013, the canal presently operates at only about one-half of its full capacity.
