= Aksu City Administration =

Coordinates: 52°02′N 76°55′E

- City administration
- Ақсу қалалық әкімдігі
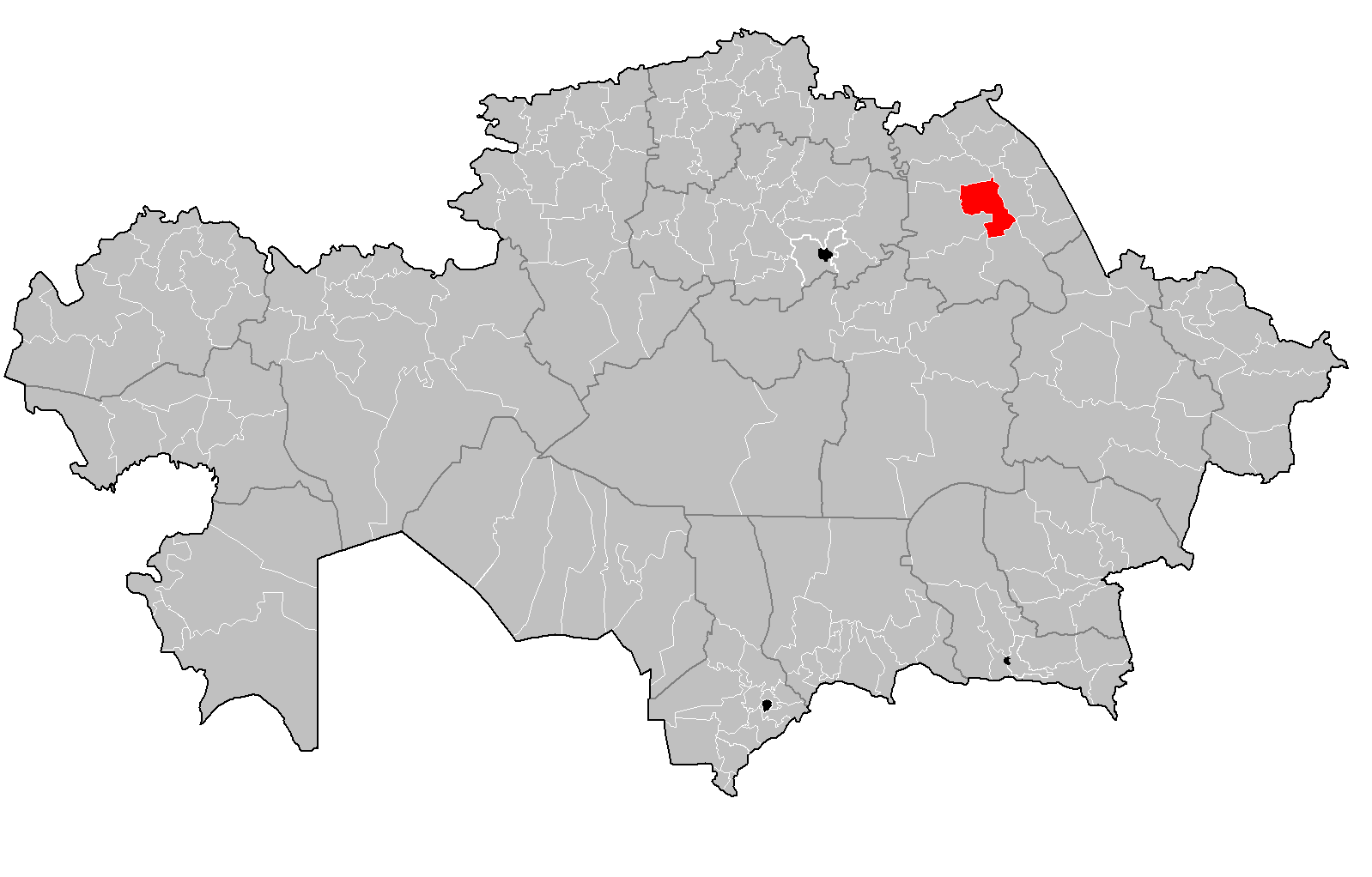
- Interactive map of Aksu City Administration
- Country: Kazakhstan
- Region: Pavlodar Region
- Administrative center: Aksu

Area
  - Total: 8,014 km^{2} (3,094 sq mi)

Population (2021)
  - Total: 72,363
- Time zone: UTC+6 (East)

Aksu City Administration (Kazakh: Ақсу қалалық әкімдігі) is an administrative division of Pavlodar Region, Kazakhstan. The administrative center of the division is the city of Aksu. It borders with the Ekibastuz City Administration in the West.

== Divisions ==
The Aksu City Administration encompasses 31 settlements, gathered into six rural districts, and the city of Aksu. The main settlements are:

Settlement	Population (2021)
Aksu	51866
Kalkaman	2848
Yevgenyevka	2085
Kyzylzhar	1808
Ushterek	1680
Bereke	1499
Kanash Kamzin	1462
Enbek	1296
Algabas	1061
Mamayit Omarov	1004
Pogranichnik	939
Solvetka	226
