= Ekibastuz City Administration =

Coordinates: 51°40′N 75°22′E

- City administration
- Екібастұз қалалық әкімдігі
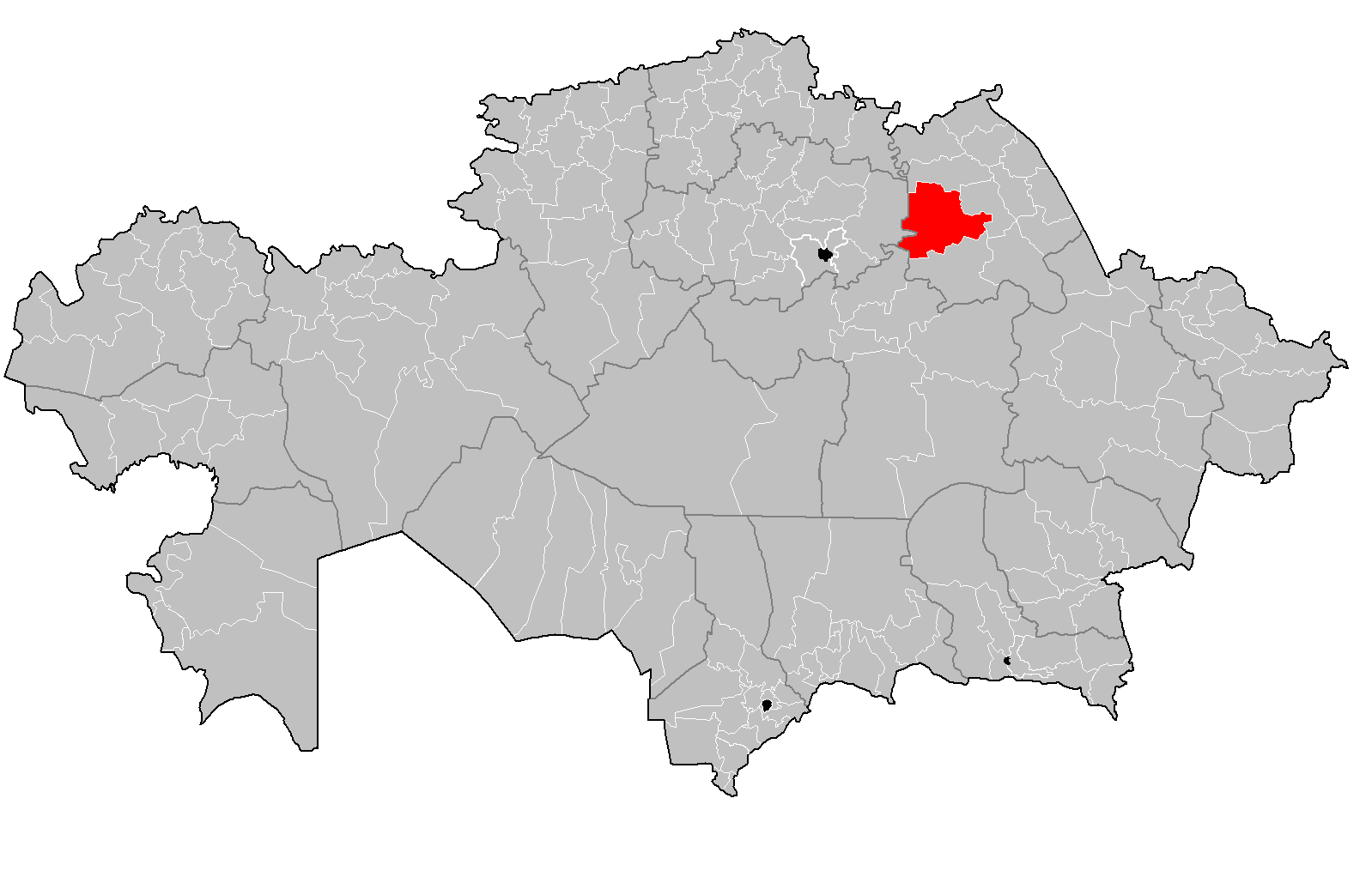
- Interactive map of Ekibastuz City Administration
- Country: Kazakhstan
- Region: Pavlodar Region
- Administrative center: Ekibastuz

Area
  - Total: 18,876 km^{2} (7,288 sq mi)

Population (2021)
  - Total: 146,374
- Time zone: UTC+6 (East)

Ekibastuz City Administration (Kazakh: Екібастұз қалалық әкімдігі, romanized: Ekıbastūz qalalyq äkımdıgı) is an administrative division of Pavlodar Region, Kazakhstan. The administrative center of the division is the city of Ekibastuz. It borders with the Aksu City Administration in the east.

== Divisions ==
The Ekibastuz City Administration encompasses eight rural districts, one rural administration, two village administrations and one city. The main settlements are:

Settlement	Population (2021)
Ekibastuz	129748
Solnechny	5843
Shiderty	3092
Bayet	743
Atygay	577
Tortui	513
