= Ekıbastūz =

Ekibastūz Екібастұз
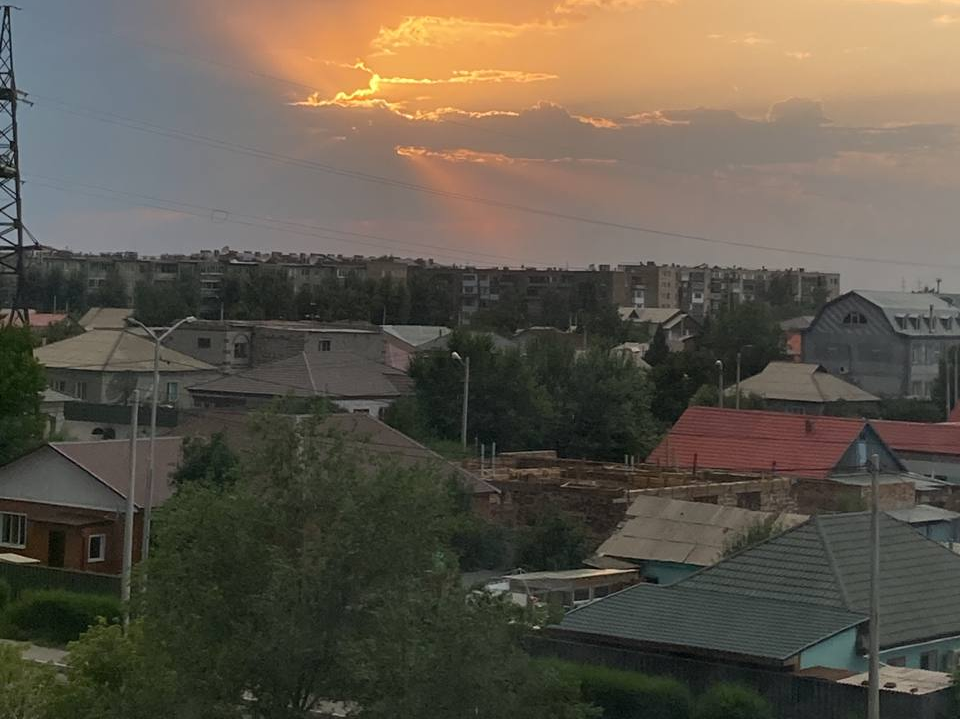
- Ekıbastūz in July 2023

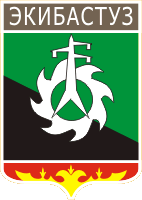
- Seal

- Location in Kazakhstan
- Coordinates: 51°40′0″N 75°22′0″E
- Country: Kazakhstan
- Region: Pavlodar Region
- City administration: Ekibastuz City Administration
- Founded: 1948
- Incorporated (city): 1957

Government
  - Akim (mayor): Beisekin Ayan Uakhitovich
- Elevation: 347 m (1,138 ft)

Population (2013)
  - Total: 146,991
- Time zone: UTC+5 (Time in Kazakhstan)
- Postal code: 141200
- Area code: +7 7187
- Climate: Dfb
- Website: http://ekibastuz.gov.kz/

Ekıbastūz (Kazakh: Екібастұз [jeˌkɘb̥ɑsˈtʊs]; Russian: Экибастуз, romanized: Ekibastuz) is a city in Pavlodar Region, northeastern Kazakhstan. It is the administrative center of the Ekibastuz City Administration. The population was 125,012 (2009 census results); 127,197 (1999 census results). Ekıbastūz is served by Ekıbastūz Airport.

== History ==
The history of Ekıbastūz begins in the 19th century, when Kosym Pshembayev, a native Kazakh who was commissioned by Russian merchants to look for mineral resources in that region, alighted on a coal field southeast of Pavlodar. The commercial exploitation of the field started soon after. The field afterwards was sold to a British businessman, Leslie Urquhart. The village of Ekıbastūz was established in 1899, named after the nearby lake of the same name, which means 2 heads of salt in Kazakh (eki 'two' + bas 'head' + tuz 'salt').

The revolution in the Russian Empire, as well as two World Wars, distracted the attention of the state from the exploitation of the field. The village was totally deserted. However, in 1948 the first team (only 50 people) started construction of the future town. The borders of the future open-cast coal fields were also marked at that time.

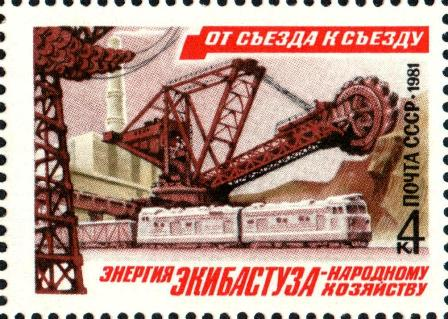
Energy of Ekıbastūz for the national economy. Post of USSR, 1981.

December 1954 was a significant period for Ekıbastūz, because the first train loads of coal were loaded. From that time the industrial development of Ekıbastūz started. In 1955 the millionth ton of the coal was produced. In the summer of 1958, Georgy Malenkov and his wife were exiled to Ekıbastūz, where they were kept under close surveillance.

The status of the "town" was given to Ekıbastūz on July 12, 1957 by a decree of the Presidium of the Supreme Soviet of the Kazakh Soviet Socialist Republic. At that time the population of Ekıbastūz was approximately 25,000 people. Nowadays, the population of Ekıbastūz is about 141,000 people.

== Industry ==
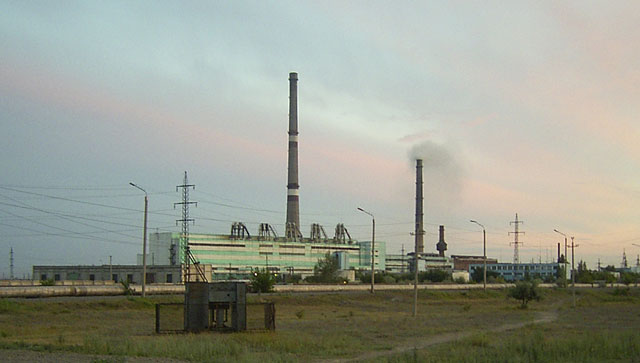
Flue gas stacks at CHP (TPP) power station in Ekıbastūz

The Vostochny Coal Mine company is located in Ekıbastūz. Today Ekıbastūz is the biggest open-cast coal field and one of the most perspective open-cast coal regions in the world. It contains more than 13 billion tons of coal in the area of 62 square kilometers. In other words, there are 74 million tons of coal per km^{3}.

Near Ekıbastūz there are two coal fired power plants: GRES-1, with installed capacity of 4,000 MW, and GRES-2, with an installed capacity of 1,000 MW. GRES-2 has the tallest chimney in the world (419.7 m).

The construction of GRES-2 was part of a Program for Ekıbastūz coalfield development, foreseeing to be built four thermal power plants, each one of 4,000 MW (8 units x 500 MWe). In years 1991–93 only Units No 1 and 2 were commissioned. The construction of Unit No 3 was started 1990 but later stopped.

From Ekıbastūz to Kokshetau runs an overhead power line designed for a transmission voltage of 1,150 kV, the Ekıbastūz-Kokshetau powerline.

Located in a naturally arid area, the city of Ekıbastūz and its industries are supplied with water primarily from the Irtysh River, via the Irtysh–Karaganda Canal, which passes about 10 km (6 mi) north of Ekıbastūz, where a number of water reservoirs are located.

== Climate ==
Climate data for Ekıbastūz (1991–2020, extremes 1949–present)
Month	Jan	Feb	Mar	Apr	May	Jun	Jul	Aug	Sep	Oct	Nov	Dec	Year
Record high °C (°F)	9.2 (48.6)	10.8 (51.4)	25.2 (77.4)	32.7 (90.9)	39.0 (102.2)	40.3 (104.5)	40.3 (104.5)	40.9 (105.6)	36.5 (97.7)	31.0 (87.8)	20.7 (69.3)	10.0 (50.0)	40.9 (105.6)
Mean daily maximum °C (°F)	−10.4 (13.3)	−8.1 (17.4)	−0.1 (31.8)	13.3 (55.9)	20.9 (69.6)	26.0 (78.8)	27.0 (80.6)	25.2 (77.4)	18.8 (65.8)	10.7 (51.3)	−0.7 (30.7)	−7.5 (18.5)	9.6 (49.3)
Daily mean °C (°F)	−14.7 (5.5)	−13.2 (8.2)	−5.3 (22.5)	7.0 (44.6)	14.3 (57.7)	20.0 (68.0)	21.2 (70.2)	19.1 (66.4)	12.6 (54.7)	4.9 (40.8)	−5.3 (22.5)	−11.7 (10.9)	4.1 (39.3)
Mean daily minimum °C (°F)	−18.7 (−1.7)	−17.7 (0.1)	−9.8 (14.4)	0.9 (33.6)	7.7 (45.9)	14.0 (57.2)	15.9 (60.6)	13.7 (56.7)	6.7 (44.1)	0.2 (32.4)	−9.0 (15.8)	−15.7 (3.7)	−1.0 (30.2)
Record low °C (°F)	−45.0 (−49.0)	−40.2 (−40.4)	−35.0 (−31.0)	−22.8 (−9.0)	−12.1 (10.2)	−1.1 (30.0)	6.0 (42.8)	−2.4 (27.7)	−6.3 (20.7)	−24.7 (−12.5)	−36.0 (−32.8)	−41.0 (−41.8)	−45.0 (−49.0)
Average precipitation mm (inches)	10.5 (0.41)	11.4 (0.45)	14.1 (0.56)	15.2 (0.60)	26.5 (1.04)	40.5 (1.59)	59.5 (2.34)	37.6 (1.48)	17.5 (0.69)	18.3 (0.72)	17.3 (0.68)	16.9 (0.67)	285.3 (11.23)
Average precipitation days (≥ 1.0 mm)	2.9	3.7	3.8	3.5	5.1	6.3	7.3	4.9	3.8	4.4	4.3	4.8	54.8
Source 1: Pogoda.ru.net
Source 2: NOAA

== Gulag ==
It was the location of a major labor camp of the Gulag system maintained by the Soviet Union from the 1920s to the 1950s. Aleksandr Solzhenitsyn served in this camp and it is now the Shakhtyor Stadium (Ekibastuz) soccer stadium.

== See also ==
- Kengir, a related camp and site of uprising partly supported by prisoners from Ekıbastūz.
