= List of nickel mines in Canada =

This is a list of nickel mines in Canada sorted by province.

== Manitoba ==
Mine	Coordinates	Associated town	Owner	Dates	Comments	References
Birchtree Mine	55°42′06″N 097°55′37″W	Thompson	Vale Canada	1965–Present	In 2005 Birchtree mine was the recipient of the John T. Ryan Trophy for having achieving the lowest accident frequency of all Canadian metal mines. In 2008 it received the regional John T. Ryan trophy for the Prairies & Northwest Territories.	
Bucko Lake Mine	54°52′40.8″N 098°39′25.1994″W	Wabowden	CaNickel	2009–Present	near Wabowden, Manitoba, Canada and is owned by CaNickel Mining LTD previously Crowflight Minerals who purchased the property from Xtrata. Production began on 10 June 2009.	

== Newfoundland and Labrador ==
Mine	Coordinates	Associated region	Owner	Dates	Comments	References
Voisey's Bay Mine	56°20′5″N 62°6′11″W	Voisey's Bay	Vale Canada	2005–Present	Purchased for $4.3 billion Canadian dollars	

== Ontario ==
Mine	Coordinates	Associated town	Owner	Dates	Comments	References
Coleman Mine	46°40′1.51″N 81°21′36.36″W	Sudbury	Vale Canada	1970–Present		
Copper Cliff North Mine	46°29′45″N 81°03′20″W	Copper Cliff	Vale Canada			
Copper Cliff South Mine	46°27′30″N 81°04′45″W	Copper Cliff	Vale Canada		Discovered in 1887	

== Quebec ==
Mine	Coordinates	Associated region	Owner	Dates	Comments	References
Raglan Mine	61°41′15″N 073°40′41″W	Nunavik	Glencore	1997–Present		
Nunavik Nickel	61°33′51″N 073°25′36″W	Nunavik	Jilin Jien	2009-present		
