= Impact Benefit Agreements =

Confidential contractual agreements

Impact Benefit Agreements (IBA) are confidential contractual agreements typically signed between local and Indigenous communities and industrial proponents seeking to begin a development project. They outline how Indigenous communities will share in the benefits of the project either through financial benefits, contracting, skills and employment, consultation and participation and how industrial proponents will mitigate social and environmental harm in accordance with measures defined by Indigenous communities. IBAs are context specific and have no mandated requirements for the contents and can be adapted to suit the unique needs of each community.

== History ==
=== UNDRIP, UNDA and FPIC ===
In 2016, the implementation of the Declaration on the Rights of Indigenous Peoples (UNDRIP) and the United Nations Declaration on the Rights of Indigenous Peoples Act (Canada) (UNDA) led to the adoption of standards like Free, prior and informed consent (FPIC) in Canada. These standards have pushed for more Indigenous participation and rights to determine if and how development projects should happen on Indigenous land. Although, UNDRIP, UNDA and FPIC have been criticized for vague and noncommittal language and incompatibility with Canadian laws.

=== Duty to consult ===
In addition to UNDRIP, Canada has a process called Duty to consult and accommodate, derived from section 35 of Canada's Constitution Act, 1982 which recognizes and affirms Indigenous treaty rights. Duty to consult and accommodate requires that if there is conduct that may have adverse effects on Indigenous titles or lands, the Crown must consult with relevant affected Indigenous groups and take into account their interests Consultation can use many processes, because of this it is possible that the Crown's chosen methods do not reflect specific accommodations required by the affected Indigenous group. Furthermore, duty to consult is only concerned with the Crown's consultation process, and thus project proponents are therefore not obligated to consult Indigenous groups when beginning a development project.

=== Impact Benefit Agreements ===
Due to uncertainty surrounding consultation and consent, project proponents were facing project delays and disruptions due to protests and legal opposition from Indigenous communities. Proponents were motivated to find new ways of engaging with impacted Indigenous communities and Impact Benefit Agreements were developed. Initially, IBAs were used primarily for the mining sector but have since been expanded to other sectors, such as the energy sector. Agreements are typically developed during the planning phase and offer more flexibility and collaboration. Agreements were found to date back as early as 1990 but accelerated after 2004 and 2005 after the Supreme Court of Canada announced the duty to consult.

== Critical components ==
=== Influencing Factors ===
Impact Benefit Agreements are mandated through legislation, regulation and policy in some provinces such as Nunavut, but, the majority of provinces do not mandate IBAs. Furthermore, there are no requirements for the contents of an IBA because they are highly situation and depend on the sector of the project (energy, mining).

Several factors may influence the contents of an IBA:

1. First Nation legal entitlements, including modern land claim settlements and Aboriginal rights claims;
2. What the proposed project is and its potential impacts;
3. Geographic extent of project;
4. Whether project proponent and First Nations community have a history;
5. Whether there is a history of First Nation's grievances;
6. First Nation's political and governance issues.

=== IBA Contents ===
==== Introduction ====
The introduction section outlines introductory provisions. All sections mentioned below can take many different forms depending on how the community is affected and their specific needs.

==== Community Benefits ====
This section outlines employment opportunities, skills and training, education provisions and capacity building provisions. The IBA can include hiring policies such as preferential hiring for Indigenous candidates and guidelines for programs such as training and apprenticeship programs and labour supply development programs. It can also include provisions for initiatives for workplace conditions and community support provisions. IBA's can also include provisions that remove cultural hurdles to Indigenous participation in the workplace, such as, advanced notice of job postings and cultural training to staff.

==== Economic Benefits/Financial Terms ====
An IBA may include a clause outlining economic benefits, such as royalties, profit shares or fixed cash amounts. There may be a section focused on financial compensation for community members who have been directly affected by the project. Financial benefit payments can take two forms, fixed and variable. Fixed payments can be triggered by scheduled dates, such as annual payments or by specific events such as start of construction. Variable payments could take the form of royalties for volume output.

==== Environmental Management ====
The environmental section can include subsections which addresses the impacts of the project. These subsections can include terms and conditions for specific mitigation measures, environmental monitoring and reporting. IBAs can also outline measures which are specific to the affected Indigenous community such as measures to protect burial sites and minimizing impacts on flora and fauna of cultural significance.

==== Other Common Terms for Impact Benefit Agreements ====
- Benefit sharing agreements,
- interim measures agreements,
- project support agreements,
- cooperation agreements,
- development agreements,
- protection and benefit agreements,
- market access agreements,
- standard-setting or certification agreements,
- participation agreements, and
- accommodation agreements.

== Example of IBAs in Canada ==
=== Nunavut ===
Article 26 of the Nunavut Land Claims Agreement requires an Inuit Impact and Benefits Agreement (IIBA) be finalized prior to the commencement of any major development projects on any Inuit owned lands. It also lays out 21 points of appropriate benefits to include and how to approach creating an IIBA with Inuit people. The Raglan Agreement was the first IBA in Canada, it was negotiated and signed between a mining company and Indigenous group in 1995.

==== Mary River Project ====
The Mary River Mine Project is a large open-pit iron mine on Baffin Island which is land predominantly owned by Inuit. The mine is operated by Baffinland Iron Mines Corporation and has been in commercial production since 2015. An original IIBA was signed in 2013 between Baffinland and the Qikiqtani Inuit Association (QIA), but was superseded by an Amended Agreement in 2018 due to an increase in production from the project's original plan. The IIBA included provisions for finances, ownership, subcontracting, management, employment, education, and training, all provisions were accompanied with details on how they were to be accomplished.

=== Northwest Territories ===
The Mineral Resources Act, 2019 was developed after the federal government handed control over lands and natural resources to the territory. The new Act would require mining companies to sign Impact Benefit Agreements with Indigenous communities if their project meets the threshold outline by the Government of the Northwest Territories. The Government of the Northwest Territories holds the authority to 'waive' the requirement of an Impact Benefit Agreement "Where exceptional circumstances exist".

== Critiques of IBAs ==
=== Confidentiality ===
Confidentiality of agreements have been criticized because agreements deal with Indigenous rights and environmental management, which are generally considered issues of public interest. Secondly, restricting agreement information to proponents and affected Indigenous communities weakens Indigenous bargaining positions because communities are unable to learn from past agreements. Thirdly, it is difficult to ensure agreed benefits are being fulfilled and if there are violations of the agreement if these are being properly addressed. Although, confidentiality may be warranted in some cases, for example if the Indigenous community doesn't want to promote the idea of resource developments on their land.

=== Context ===
When negotiating terms and conditions for an IBA it is important to remember that different communities will have unique demands. Not every community will place high importance on skills and employment section of an IBA because benefits derived from this sector will not improve socioeconomic issues.
