= McBride Project =

Nickel-cobalt-copper deposit in Ontario, Canada

The McBride Project is a 880 hectare plot of land located near Limerick, Ontario, Canada. It contains an estimated 5.1 million tons of nickel-cobalt-copper mineralization near the earth's surface.

== Location, geology, and mineral assets ==
The location is near Limerick, Ontario, south of Ontario Highway 620, west of Old Hastings Road, and extends east to Ontario Highway 62. The location lacks road access and can only be accessed by crossing over private land. It is located within the Crowe Valley Watershed, near Bancroft.

=== Geology ===
The mineral occurrence contains an estimated 5.1 million tons of nickel-cobalt-copper mineralization near the land's surface. Pyrrhotite, pentlandite, chalcopyrite and pyrite are contained within metapyroxenite.

== Ownership and history ==
The project is owned by engineer Derek McBride. The location was previously known as Macassa's nickel-copper anomaly or Limerick/Macassa and with extraction rights held by Macassa Gold Mines Ltd. who drilled the site in 1961, 1962, and 1963. The mineral claim is numbered 4209871.

Limerick Mines purchased the claim in 2003, but went bankrupt before anything was mined. Hastings Highlands Resources bought the mining rights in 2010.

2018 news of an option agreement being stuck between the Hastings Highlands Resources and Pancontinental Resources Corporation (Pancon) was met with resistance from the local community, the Limerick Area Conservation Coalition, Steenburg Lake Community Association, Limerick Waterways Ratepayers Association, and Alderville First Nation. Pancon later exited the partnership.

McBride later spoke on local radio station Moose FM about his aspirations to find a new business partner. In 2019, McBridge stated that a new investor was interested in the project.

== See also ==
- List of nickel mines in Canada
- List of copper mines in Canada
