= Copper Cliff North Mine =

Underground nickel mine in Copper Cliff, Ontario, Canada

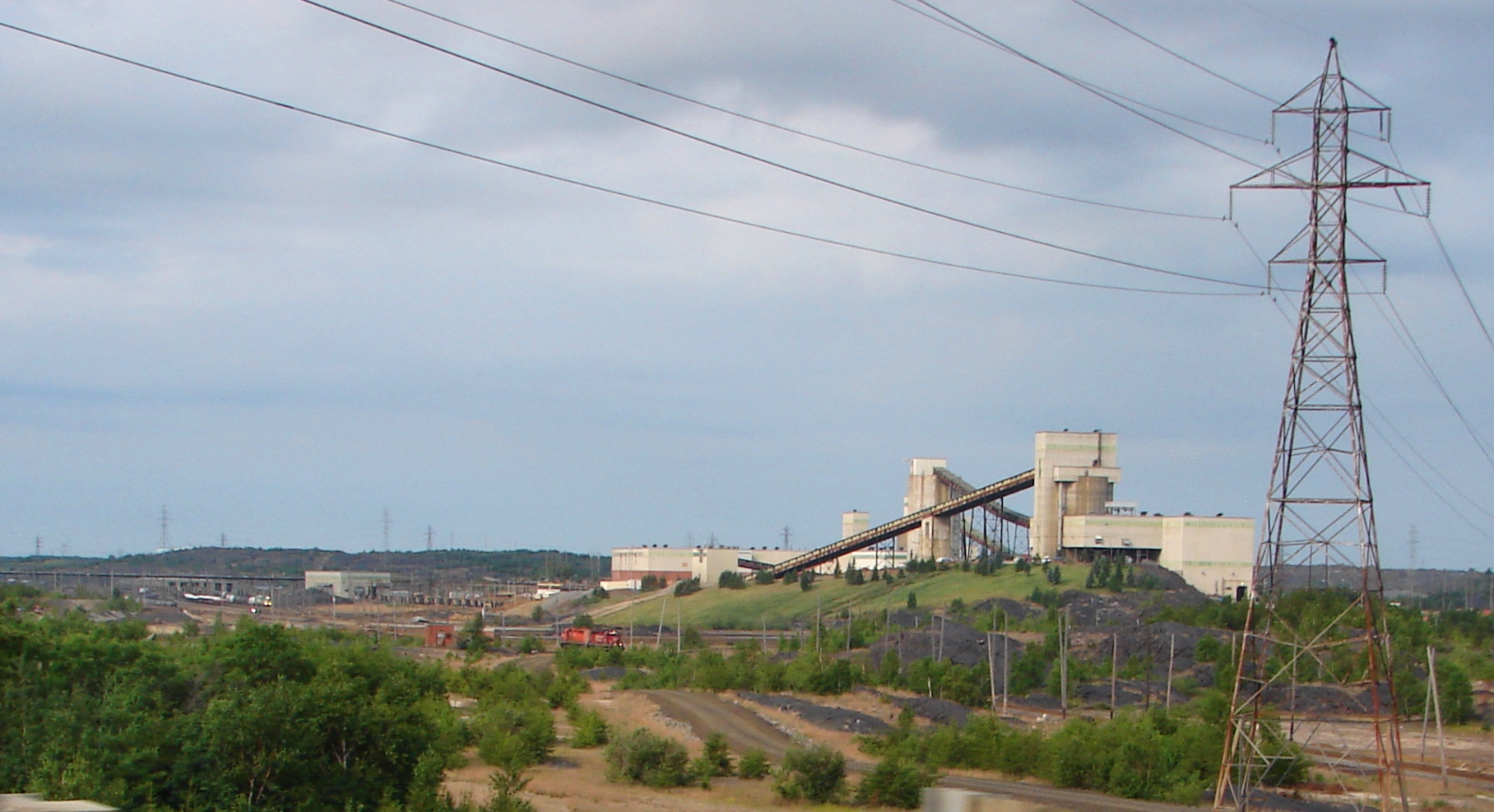

- Location in Canada Copper Cliff North Mine (Ontario) Copper Cliff North Mine (Canada)
- Interactive map of Copper Cliff North Mine
- Location: Copper Cliff, Ontario; 46°29′45″N 81°03′20″W
- Products: Nickel
- Company: Vale Canada Limited
- Website: www.vale.com

Copper Cliff North Mine is an underground nickel mine in Copper Cliff, Ontario, Canada. It is owned and operated by Vale Canada Limited.

== History ==
The mine was the 2007 winner of the John T. Ryan Trophy for metal mines. Employing approximately 260 people, the mine went through 2006 without a lost-time-accident, producing of 4,200 tonnes ore per day.

== See also ==
- Copper Cliff South Mine
- List of nickel mines in Canada
- List of mines in Ontario
