= John T. Ryan Trophy =

Awards to mines in Canada

John T. Ryan Trophies are awards of excellence presented by Canadian Institute of Mining, Metallurgy and Petroleum (CIM) to a mine in a given category which experiences the lowest accident frequency during the previous year in all of Canada. Three national trophies are given each year, one to a metal mine, a coal mine and one to a select mine. An award is also given out to the mine with the lowest accident frequency in each of the following regions:

- Quebec and East
- Ontario
- Prairies and Northwest Territories
- British Columbia and Yukon.

The award is given by Mine Safety Appliances Company as a memorial to the founder John T. Ryan.

== Award winners ==
=== Metal Mines ===
Year	Company	Mine	City/Town	Province
2014 shared	Barrick Gold Cameco Corporation	Williams Mine McArthur River Mine	Marathon Saskatoon	Ontario Saskatchewan
2013	Xstrata Copper	Kidd Operations	Timmins	Ontario
2012	Xstrata Zinc	Brunswick Mine	Bathurst	New Brunswick
2011	Vale Inco	Thompson Mine and Birchtree Mine	Thompson	Manitoba
2010	Cameco	McArthur River Mine	Saskatoon	Saskatchewan
2009	Vale Inco	Copper Cliff North Mine	Copper Cliff	Ontario
2008	Vale Inco	Copper Cliff North Mine	Copper Cliff	Ontario
2007	CVRD Inco	Copper Cliff North Mine	Copper Cliff	Ontario
2006	Inco Ltd.	Garson Mine	Garson	Ontario
2005	Inco Ltd.	Birchtree Mine	Thompson	Manitoba
2004	Kinross Gold Corporation	New Britania Mine	Snow Lake	Manitoba
2003	Cogema Resources Inc.	Cluff Lake Mine	Saskatoon	Saskatchewan
2002	Noranda-Falconbridge	Société Minière Raglan	Rouyn-Noranda	Quebec
2001	Cameco Corporation	Rabbit Lake Operation	Saskatoon	Saskatchewan
2000	Cameco Corporation	McArthur River Mine and Key Lake Mine	Saskatoon	Saskatchewan
1999	Cogema Resources Inc.	Cluff Lake Mine	Saskatoon	Saskatchewan
1998	TVX Gold Inc	New Britannia Mine	Snow Lake	Manitoba
1997	TVX Gold Inc.	New Britannia Mine	Snow Lake	Manitoba
1996	Placer Dome Canada Limited	Detour Lake Mine	Timmins	Ontario
1995	Placer Dome Canada Limited	Detour Lake Mine	Timmins	Ontario
1994	Cominco Ltd.	Polaris Operation	Polaris	Northwest Territories
1993	Echo Bay Mines Ltd.	Lupin Operations	Lupin	Northwest Territories
1992	Cominco	Polaris	Polaris	Northwest Territories
1991	Falconbridge Limited	Kidd Creek Division	Timmins	Ontario
1990	St. Andrew Goldfields Limited	-	Matheson	Ontario
1989	Inco Limited; Inco Limited; Ontario Rio Algom Limited	Frood Mine; Copper Cliff South Mine; Stanleigh Mine	Sudbury; Copper Cliff; Elliot Lake	Ontario; Ontario; Ontario
1988	Les Mines Selbaie	-	Joutel	Quebec
1987	Minnova Inc.	Division Lac Shortt	Chapais	Quebec
1986	Falconbridge Limited	East Mine Complex	Falconbridge	Ontario
1985	Kidd Creek Mines Ltd.	No. 1 Mine	Timmins	Ontario
1984	Kidd Creek Mines Ltd.	No. 1 Mine	Timmins	Ontario
1983	Les Mines d’Or Kienna Limitée	-	Val-d'Or	Quebec
1982	Kidd Creek Mines Ltd.	No. 2 Mine	Timmins	Ontario
1981	Kidd Creek Mines Ltd.	No. 1 Mine	Timmins	Ontario
1980	Texasgulf Canada Limited	Kidd Creek No. 1 Mine Underground Mine and Open Pit	Timmins	Ontario
1979	Hudbay	Chisel Lake and Ghost Lake mines	Snow Lake	Manitoba
1978	Texasgulf Canada Limited	Kidd Creek No. 1 Mine Underground Mine and Open Pit	Timmins	Ontario
1977	Texasgulf Canada Limited	Kidd Creek No. 1 Mine Underground Mine and Open Pit	Timmins	Ontario
1976	Texasgulf Canada Limited	-	Timmins	Ontario
1975	Texasgulf Canada Limited	-	Timmins	Ontario
1974	Texada Mines Ltd.	-	Gillies Bay	British Columbia
1973	Campbell Chibougamau Mines Limited	The Main Mine and Cedar Bay Mine	Chibougamau	Quebec
1972	Mattagami Lake Mines Ltd.	-	Mattagami	Quebec
1971	Texada Mines Ltd.	Texada Island Operation	Gillies Bay	British Columbia
1970	Lake Dufault Mines Limited	-	Noranda	Quebec
1969	International Minerals & Chemical Corp. (Canada) Ltd.	K-1 Plant	Esterhazy	Saskatchewan
1968	International Minerals & Chemical Corp. (Canada) Ltd.	K-1 Plant	Esterhazy	Saskatchewan
1967	Potash Company of America	-	Saskatoon	Saskatchewan
1966	International Minerals & Chemical Corp. (Canada) Ltd.	K-1 Plant	Esterhazy	Saskatchewan
1965	Gaspé Copper Mines Limited	-	Murdochville	Quebec
1964	Gaspé Copper Mines Limited	-	Murdochville	Quebec
1963	Gaspé Copper Mines Limited	-	Murdochville	Quebec
1962	Quebec Lithium Corporation; Consolidated Mining and Smelting Company of Canada; Sigma Mines (Quebec) Ltd.	- The H.B. Mine; The Sigma Mine	Barraute; Salmo; Bourlamaque	Quebec; British Columbia; Quebec
1961	Quebec Lithium Corporation; Sullivan Consolidated Mines; New Calumet Mines Limited; Consolidated Mining and Smelting Company of Canada; Waite Amulet Mines Limited	- - - The H.B. Mine; Waite Amulet Mine	Barraute; Sullivan; Calumet Island; Salmo; Noranda	Quebec; Quebec; Quebec; British Columbia; Quebec
1959	Johnson’s Company; New Calumet Mines Limited; Consolidated Mining and Smelting Company of Canada	The Thetford Mines Plant - The H.B. Mine	Thetford Mines; Calumet Island; Salmo	Quebec; Quebec; British Columbia
1958	Consolidated Mining and Smelting Company of Canada; Belleterre Quebec Mines Ltd	The H.B. Mine; The Belleterre Mine	Salmo; Beleterre	British Columbia; Quebec
1957	Consolidated Mining and Smelting Company of Canada Limited; Canadian Johns Manville Company	The Bluebell Mine; The Munroe Mine	Riondel; Matheson	British Columbia; Ontario
1956	Canadian Johns Manville Company	The Munroe Mine	Matheson	Ontario
1955	Dickenson Mines Ltd.	The Dickenson Mine	Balmertown	Ontario
1954	Waite Amulet Mines Limited; Cochenour Willans Gold Mines, Ltd; McKenzie Red Lake Gold Mines Ltd.	Waite Amulet Mine; Cochenour Willans Mine; McKenzie Red Lake Mine	Noranda; Cochenour; McKenzie Island	Quebec; Ontario; Ontario
1953	The Canadian Malartic Company	Cdn. Malartic Gold Mines Ltd.	Malartic	Quebec
1952	The Canadian Malartic Company	Cdn. Malartic Gold Mines Ltd.	Malartic	Quebec
1951	The Canadian Malartic Company	Cdn. Malartic Gold Mines Ltd.	Malartic	Quebec
1950	Sigma Mines (Quebec) Ltd.	The Sigma Mine	Bourlamaque	Quebec
1949	Matachewan Cons. Mines, Ltd.	The Matachewan Mine	Matachewan	Ontario
1948	Toburn Gold Mines Ltd.	The Toburn Mine	Kirkland Lake	Ontario
1947	International Nickel Co. of Canada, Ltd	Levack Mine	Levack	Ontario
1946	International Nickel Co. of Canada, Ltd	Levack Mine	Levack	Ontario
1945	International Nickel Co. of Canada, Ltd	Garson Mine	Garson	Ontario
1944	The Stadacona Mine (1944), Ltd.	-	Rouyn	Quebec
1943	Omega Gold Mines, Ltd.	The Omega Mine	Larder Lake	Ontario
1942	Omega Gold Mines, Ltd.	The Omega Mine	Larder Lake	Ontario
1941	Chesterville Larder Lake Gold Mining Co.	The Chesterville Mine, Ltd.	Kearns	Ontario

=== Select Mines ===
John T. Ryan National Trophy for Select Mines Winners
Year	Company	Mine	City/Town	Province
2011	Canadian Gypsum Company	Windsor Plant	Windsor	Nova Scotia
2010	a Rio Tinto/Harry Winston Diamond Corporation joint venture	Diavik Diamond Mine	Yellowknife	Northwest Territories
2009	PotashCorp	New Brunswick Division	Sussex	New Brunswick
2008	BHP Billiton Diamond Mines	Ekati Diamond Mine	Yellowknife	Northwest Territories
2007	Mosaic Potash Esterhazy Limited Partnership	K1 Mine	Esterhazy	Saskatchewan
2006	PCS Potash	NB Division	Sussex	New Brunswick
2005	Little Narrows Gypsum Company	-	Little Narrows	Nova Scotia
2004	PCS Potash	NB Division	Sussex	New Brunswick
2003	Fundy Gypsum Company	-	Windsor	Nova Scotia
2002	Luscar	Poplar River Mine	Coronach	Saskatchewan
2001	Georgia-Pacific Inc. Canada	Gypsum Operations	Port Hawkesbury	Nova Scotia
1999	Fording Canadian Coal Trust	Mildred Lake Operations	Fort McMurray	Alberta
1998	PotashCorp	Rocanville Division	Rocanville	Saskatchewan
1997	PotashCorp	Rocanville Division	Rocanville	Saskatchewan
1996	PotashCorp	Rocanville Division	Rocanville	Saskatchewan
1995	PotashCorp; Little Narrows Gypsum Company	Rocanville Division -	Rocanville; Little Narrows	Saskatchewan; Nova Scotia
1993	International Minerals & Chemical Corporation	-	Esterhazy	Saskatchewan
1992	Little Narrows Gypsum	-	Little Narrows	Nova Scotia
1991	Fundy Gypsum Company	-	Windsor	Nova Scotia
1990	International Minerals & Chemical Corporation; Westmin Mines	K1 Mine; Premier Gold Project	Esterhazy; Stewart	Saskatchewan; British Columbia
1989	PotashCorp; Potash Corporation of Saskatchewan Inc. International Minerals & Chemical Corporation; Cameco; Little Narrows Gypsum Company	Rocanville Division; Allan Division; K2 Mine; Rabbit Lake Operation -	Rocanville; Allan; Esterhazy; Rabbit Lake; Little Narrows	Saskatchewan; Saskatchewan; Saskatchewan; Saskatchewan; Nova Scotia
1988	PotashCorp; Obed Mountain Coal Company	Rocanville Division -	Rocanville; Hinton	Saskatchewan; Alberta
1987	Equity Silver Mines; Fundy Gypsum Company; Canadian Gypsum Company	- - Hagersville Mine	Houston; Windsor; Hagersville	British Columbia; Nova Scotia; Ontario
1986	Potash Company of America	Patricia Lake Mine	Saskatoon	Saskatchewan
1985	International Minerals & Chemical Corporation	K-2 Mine	Esterhazy	Saskatchewan
1984	International Minerals & Chemical Corporation; Little Narrows Gypsum Company	K-2 Mine -	Esterhazy; Little Narrows	Saskatchewan; Nova Scotia
1983	Fundy Gypsum; Georgia-Pacific Corporation; Potash Corporation of Saskatchewan Mining	Windsor Mine; River Denys Mine; Rocanville Division	Windsor; River Denys; Rocanville	Nova Scotia; Nova Scotia; Saskatchewan
1982	Potash Company of America	Patricia Lake Mine	Saskatoon	Saskatchewan
1981	Flintkote Holdings; Canada Cement Lafarge	- Steep Rock Quarry	Flat Bay -	Newfoundland; Manitoba
1980	Potash Company of America	Patricia Lake Mine	Saskatoon	Saskatchewan
1979	Potash Company of America; Newfoundland Mineral	Patricia Lake Mine; Oval Mine	Saskatoon; Conception Bay South	Saskatchewan; Newfoundland
1978	Fundy Gypsum Company; Canada Cement Lafarge Limited Plant	- -	Windsor; Steep Rock	Nova Scotia; Manitoba
1977	International Minerals & Chemical Corporation	-	Esterhazy	Saskatchewan
1976	Texasgulf Canada	-	Timmins	Ontario
1975	Pine Point Mines	-	Pine Point	Northwest Territories
1974	Fundy Gypsum	-	Windsor	Nova Scotia
1973	Georgia-Pacific Corporation	Gypsum Division	River Denys	Nova Scotia
1972	Pine Point Mines	-	Pine Point	Northwest Territories
1971	Fundy Gypsum	Miller’s Creek, Wentworth & Hantsport Operations	Windsor	Nova Scotia
1970	Little Narrows Gypsum	-	Little Narrows	Nova Scotia

=== Coal Mines ===
John T. Ryan National Trophy for Coal Mines Winners
Year	Company	Mine	City/Town	Province
2011	Teck Coal Limited	Coal Mountain Operations	Sparwood	British Columbia
2010	Sherritt International	Genesee Mine	Warburg	Alberta
2009	Sherritt International	Sheerness Mine	Hanna	Alberta
2008	Western Canadian Coal Corp. Prairie Mines & Royalty Limited; Prairie Mines & Royalty Limited	Brule Mine; Genesee Operations; Paintearth Mine	Tumbler Ridge; Warburg, Alberta; Forestburg, Alberta	British Columbia; Alberta; Alberta
2007	Elk Valley Coal	Greenhills Operation	Elkford	British Columbia
2006	Luscar Limited	Genesee Mine	Warburg	Alberta
2005	Luscar Limited	Paintearth Mine	Forestburg	Alberta
2004	Luscar Limited; Luscar Limited; Quinsam Coal Corporation	Sheerness Mine; Genesee Operation -	Hanna; Warburg; Campbell River	Alberta; Alberta; British Columbia
2003	Luscar Limited; Luscar Limited; N.B. Coal Limited	Paintearth MineM; Genesee Operation -	Forestburg; Warburg; Minto	Alberta; Alberta; New Brunswick
2002	Luscar Limited; Quinsam Coal Corporation	Poplar River Mine -	Coronach; Campbell River	Saskatchewan; British Columbia
2001	Luscar Limited	Sheerness Mine	Hanna	Alberta
2000	N.B. Coal Limited; Fording Coal Limited	- Genesee Operations	Minto; Warburg	New Brunswick; Alberta
1999	N.B. Coal Limited; Fording Coal Limited; Forestburg Collieries (1984) Ltd.,	- Genesee Operations; Paintearth Mine	Minto; Warburg; Forestburg	New Brunswick; Alberta; Alberta
1998	N.B. Coal Limited; Fording Coal Limited; Forestburg Collieries (1984) Ltd.,	- Genesee Operations; Paintearth Mine	Minto; Warburg; Forestburg	New Brunswick; Alberta; Alberta
1996	1996 Fording Coal Limited; Forestburg Collieries (1984) Limited; Forestburg Collieries (1984) Limited; Manalta Coal Limited	Genesee Operations; Sheerness Mine; Paintearth Mine; Vesta Mine	Warburg; Hanna; Forestburg; Halkirk	Alberta; Alberta; Alberta; Alberta
1995	Fording Coal Limited; New Brunswick Coal Limited	Genesee Operations -	Warburg; Minto	Alberta; New Brunswick
1994	Fording Coal Limited	Greenhills Operation	Elkford	British Columbia
1993	Fording Coal Limited	-	Wabamun	Alberta
1991	Curragh Resources Inc	Westray Coal Division	New Glasgow	Nova Scotia
1990	Smoky River Coal Limited	Mine No. 1765	Grande Cache	Alberta
1986	Smoky River Coal Limited	Mine No. 1765	Grande Cache	Alberta
1988	Smoky River Coal Limited	Mine No. 1765	Grande Cache	Alberta
1989	Smoky River Coal Limited	Mine No. 1765	Grande Cache	Alberta
1985	Westar Mining Ltd.	Balmer Operations	Sparwood	British Columbia
1984	Cape Breton Development Corporation	Donkin-Morien Mine	Cape Breton Island	Nova Scotia
1982	Petro-Canada Exploration Inc. & Precambrian Shield Resources Ltd.	Kipp Mine	-	Alberta
1978	McIntyre Mines Limited	-	Grande Cache	Alberta
1977	McIntyre Mines Limited	-	Grande Cache	Alberta
1976	McIntyre Mines Limited	-	Grande Cache	Alberta
1975	Kaiser Resources Limited	The Michel Colliery Operation	Sparwood	British Columbia
1974	Kaiser Resources Limited	The Michel Colliery Operation	Sparwood	British Columbia
1973	Kaiser Resources Limited	The Michel Colliery Operation	Sparwood	British Columbia
1972	Century Coals Limited	Atlas Mine	East Coulee	Alberta
1971	Kaiser Resources Limited	The Michel Colliery Operation	Sparwood	British Columbia
1970	Charter Coals Limited	Century Coals Limited	East Coulee	Alberta
1969	Charter Coals Limited	Century Coals Limited	East Coulee	Alberta
1968	Kaiser Coal Co. Ltd.	Michel Colliery	Michel	British Columbia
1967	Charter Coals Limited	-	East Coulee	Alberta
1966	Charter Coals Limited	Atlas Mine	East Coulee	Alberta
1965	Star-Key Mines Ltd.	-	St. Albert	Alberta
1964	The Crow’s Nest Pass Coal Company	Michel Colliery Limited	Michel	British Columbia
1963	Century Coals Limited	Atlas Mine	East Coulee	Alberta
1962	The Crow’s Nest Pass Coal Company	Michel Colliery Limited	Michel	British Columbia
1961	Comox Mining Company Limited	T’Sable River Mine	Union Bay	British Columbia
1960	Amalgamated Coals Limited	The Western Monarch Mines	East Coulee	Alberta
1959	Old Sydney Collieries, Ltd	The Princess Colliery	Sydney	Nova Scotia
1958	Dominion Coal Co. Ltd	No. 25 Colliery	Gardiner Mines	Nova Scotia
1957	Coleman Collieries	The McGillivray Mine	Coleman	Alberta
1956	Canadian Collieries Resources	The Foothills Mine	Foothills	Alberta
1955	Dominion Coal Co. Ltd.	No. 4 Colliery (Caledonia)	Glace Bay	Nova Scotia
1954	Dominion Coal Co. Ltd	No. 18 Colliery (New Victoria)	New Waterford	Nova Scotia
1953	Dominion Coal Co. Ltd	No. 18 Colliery (New Victoria)	New Waterford	Nova Scotia
1952	Dominion Coal Co. Ltd	No. 18 Colliery (New Victoria)	New Waterford	Nova Scotia
1951	Dominion Coal Co. Ltd	No. 18 Colliery (New Victoria)	New Waterford	Nova Scotia
1950	Old Sydney Collieries, Ltd	The Princess Colliery	Sydney	Nova Scotia
1949	Old Sydney Collieries, Ltd	The Princess Colliery	Sydney	Nova Scotia
1948	Dominion Coal Co. Ltd.	No. 4 Colliery (Caledonia)	Glace Bay	Nova Scotia
1947	Dominion Coal Co. Ltd	No. 2 Colliery	Cadomin	Alberta
1946	Dominion Coal Co. Ltd	No. 25 Colliery	Gardiner Mines	Nova Scotia
1944	Dominion Coal Co. Ltd	No. 25 Colliery	Gardiner Mines	Nova Scotia
1942	Dominion Coal Co. Ltd	No. 25 Colliery	Gardiner Mines	Nova Scotia

== See also ==
- List of occupational health and safety awards
