= Copper Cliff South Mine =

Underground nickel mine in Copper Cliff, Ontario, Canada

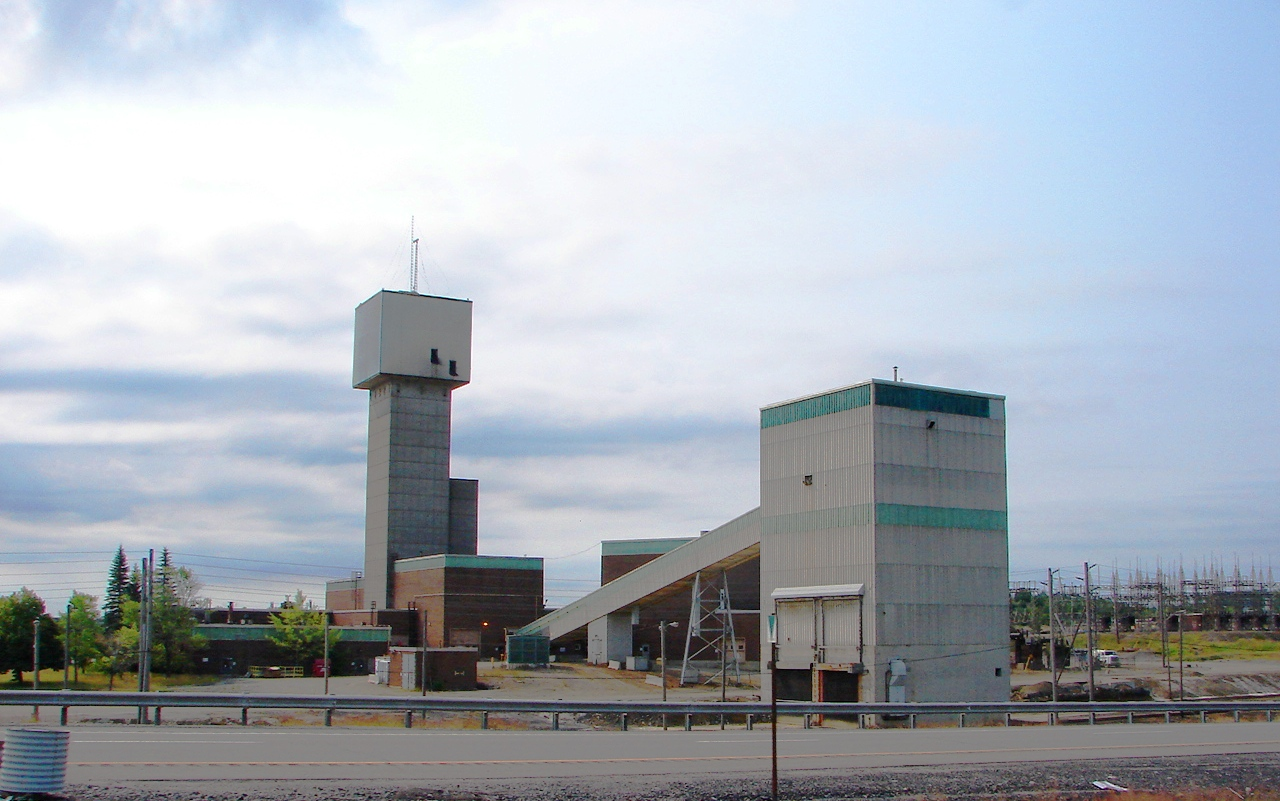

- Location in Canada Copper Cliff South Mine (Ontario) Copper Cliff South Mine (Canada)
- Interactive map of Copper Cliff South Mine
- Location: Copper Cliff, Ontario, Canada; 46°27′30″N 81°04′45″W
- Products: Nickel
- Discovered: 1887
- Company: Vale Canada Limited
- Website: www.vale.com

Copper Cliff South Mine is an underground nickel mine in Copper Cliff, Ontario, Canada. It is owned and operated by Vale Canada Limited.

Part of the mine is located under the town of Copper Cliff, which means that additional care must be put into the crown pillar.

== See also ==
- Copper Cliff North Mine
- List of nickel mines in Canada
- List of mines in Ontario
