= Raglan Mine =

Mining complex in Nunavik, Quebec, Canada

- Location in Quebec
- Location: Nunavik, Quebec, Canada; 61°41′15″N 073°40′41″W
- Products: Nickel; Copper; Cobalt
- Opened: 1997
- Company: Glencore

Raglan Mine is a large nickel mining complex in the Nunavik region of northern Quebec, Canada. It is located about 100 kilometres (62 mi) south of Deception Bay. Discovery of the deposits is credited to Murray Edmund Watts in 1931 or 1932. It is owned and operated by Glencore Canada Corporation. The mine site is located in sub-arctic permafrost of the Cape Smith Belt, with an average underground temperature of −15 °C (5 °F).

== Transportation and accommodations ==
The complex is served by and operates the Kattiniq/Donaldson Airport, which is 10 nautical miles (19 km; 12 mi) east of the principal mine site. There is a gravel road leading from the mine site to the seaport in Deception Bay. It is the only road of any distance in the province north of the 55th parallel. As the complex is remote from even the region's Inuit communities, workers must lodge at the mine site, typically for weeks at a time. From the mine site employees are flown to Val D'or, or in the case of Inuit employees, their home community. Ore produced from the mine is milled on-site then trucked 100 km (62 mi) to Deception Bay. From Deception Bay the concentrate is sent via cargo ship during the short shipping season (even by ice breaker it is only accessible 8 months of the year) to Quebec City, and then via rail to be smelted at Glencore's facilities in Falconbridge, Ontario. Following smelting in Ontario, the concentrate is sent back to Quebec City via rail, loaded onto a ship and sent to the Glencore Nikkelverk in Kristiansand, Norway to be refined.

== Inuit relations ==
In February 1995 Falconbridge Ltd. signed an Impact and Benefits Agreement (IBA) called the "Raglan Agreement (1995)" with the local Inuit community. The mine’s direct contribution to Nunavik’s economy was forecasted to be $130 million by the end of 2007. Originally the complex was created with the participation of the Inuit owned Makivik Corporation, with the hopes of attracting employment for local residents. Glencore is working with the Kativik Regional Government and the Kativik School Board to educate the local Inuit population so they will be able to work at the mine. Glencore aims to have at least 20% Inuit workers in the workforce. Currently the mines' Inuit work force is close to 20% with most of the remainder being French Canadian from southern Quebec. Given the cultural mix at the complex, ethnic origin and discrimination are significant on-site issues. In an attempt to further ease any social or cultural strain, Inuit workers are flown home to their communities at the end of each two-week shift.

== Workforce ==
Raglan Mine currently employs 1,280 workers. In May 2022, 630 members of the United Steelworkers union voted to strike after the union and Glencore failed to negotiate a new collective agreement. In July, Glencore’s improved offer was rejected by a vote of 76.7% of the union. On September 8, 2022, the United Steelworkers union announced that after a 15-week strike, the latest offer was approved by a vote 60.7%.

== Safety ==
Raglan mine has won the national John T. Ryan Trophy in 2002, for having the lowest accident frequency of all metal mines in Canada. In 2007 it was awarded the F.J. O'Connell award by the Mining Association of Quebec for recording the most improvement of mine safety in Quebec.

The operation has committed to a goal of “Zero Harm,” and has in turn adopted SafeNickel to create a culture of prevention.

== Production ==
The mine was originally designed to produce 130,000 tons per year of ore concentrate, containing 21,000 tons of nickel, 5,000 tons of copper, 200 tons of cobalt, and a small amount of precious metals.

Raglan currently produces 1.5 million tonnes of ore annually from four underground mines and two open pit operations. The original Impact and Benefits Agreement (IBA) limited production to 1.3 million tonnes of ore per year.

Raglan Mine’s current operation (Phase I), first established in 1997, was expected to gradually cease after 2020. Glencore launched the Sivumut Project to ensure the continuation of the mine’s operations up to 2041.

Sivumut would include Phase II, and Phase III. Phase II will expand the currently active Qakimajurk mine as well as establish Mining Project 14, a new underground mine with both expected to be operational from 2020 to 2035. The scope of the project will remain within the current property limits, will have little above-ground footprint due to being underground, will leverage existing infrastructure, and not affect any other natural watercourses.

== See also ==
- List of nickel mines in Canada
- Voisey's Bay Mine
