= Garson Mine =

Mine in Ontario, Canada

GarsonMine
- Location Garson Mine (Ontario) Garson Mine (Canada)
- Interactive map of GarsonMine
- Location: Ontario, Canada; 46°34′03″N 80°51′25″W
- Products: Nickel; Copper; Cobalt; Platinum; Palladium; Gold
- Discovered: 1908
- Company: Vale Canada Limited

Garson Mine is an underground nickel mine located in the community of Garson, within the city of Greater Sudbury, Ontario, Canada. Part of the Sudbury Basin, the Garson mine was developed around 1908 by Mond Nickel Company, and is now owned by Vale Inco.

== Garson Ramp Project ==
In 2007 Vale Inco approved a plan to re-open the Garson Ramp. The project is in the development phase and will cost $30 million. The Garson Ramp project will involve three ore bodies and produce 500 tonnes of ore per day.

== Ground Conditions ==
The ground conditions at Garson Mine are dangerous and unstable. Workers have lost their lives due to unstable ground conditions at Garson Mine and these conditions continue to be a problem for operations. A rock burst at the mine left nine workers trapped underground for several hours on January 23, 2007, although they were rescued with no injuries.

The unsafe ground conditions at Garson Mine are caused from a combination of variables, the two most prominent being that the mine is on a dyke and aquifer.

== Safety ==
In 2005 Garson Mine won the CIM's National John T. Ryan Trophy for Metal Mines. This award is given to the metal mine which has the lowest accident frequency in the country.

== See also ==
- List of mines in Ontario
