= Inco Superstack =

Second-tallest freestanding chimney

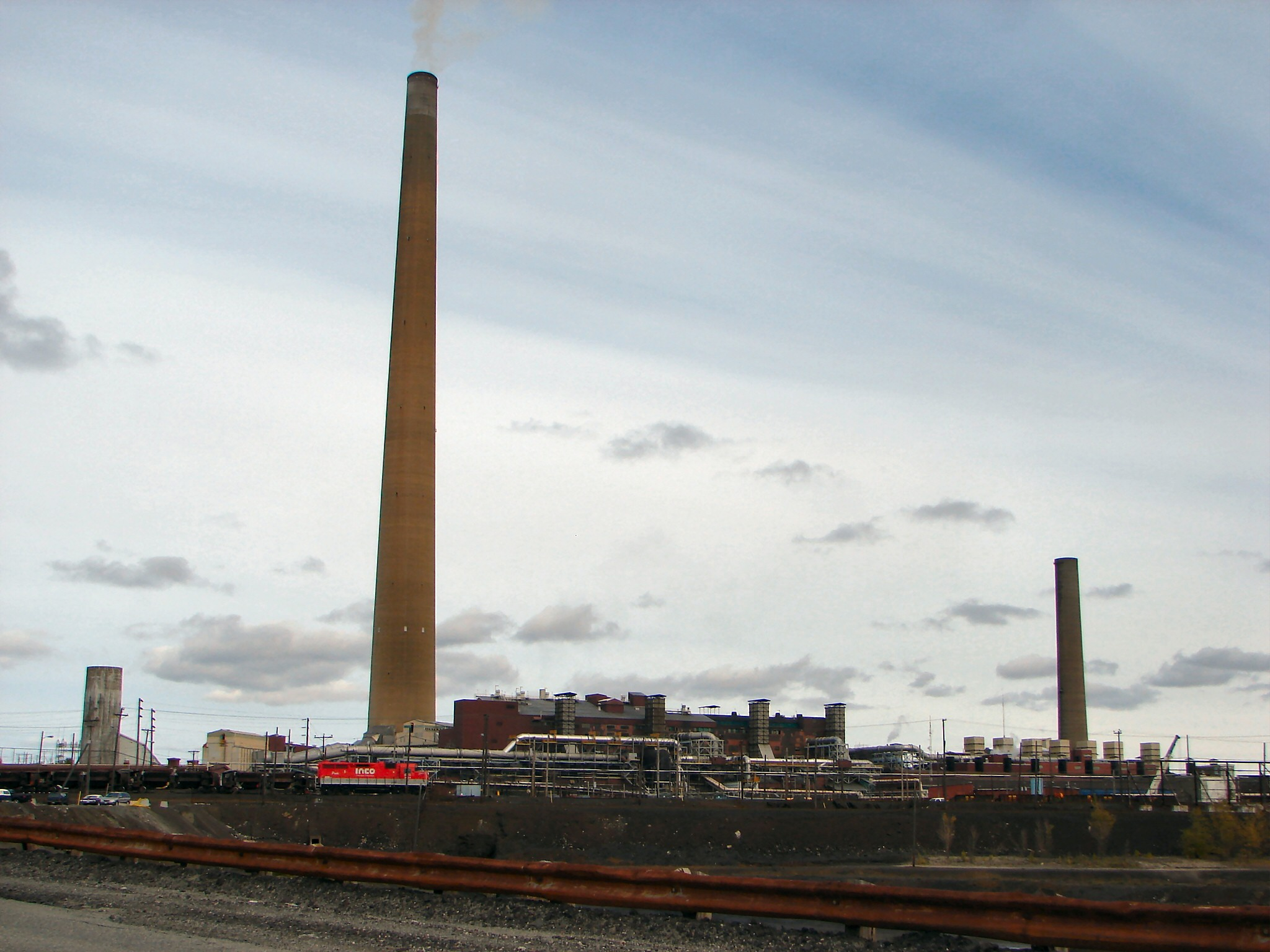
- The Vale-Inco Superstack at the Inco Copper Cliff smelter
- Alternative names: Vale Superstack

Record height
- Tallest in the world from 1971 to 1987^{[I]}
- Preceded by: Mitchell Power Plant
- Surpassed by: Ekibastuz GRES-2 Power Station

General information
- Status: Decommissioned
- Type: Chimney
- Location: Greater Sudbury, Canada
- Coordinates: 46°28′48.23″N 81°3′23.43″W
- Construction started: 1970
- Completed: 1972
- Cost: $25 million ($160 million inflation adjusted)
- Owner: Vale Canada

Height
- Height: 381 m (1,250 ft)

Dimensions
- Diameter: at base: 35 m (115 ft) at top: 16 m (52 ft)

Technical details
- Material: Reinforced concrete with stainless steel liner

The Inco Superstack in Sudbury, Ontario, with a height of 381 metres (1,250 ft), is the tallest chimney in Canada and in the Western Hemisphere and the second-tallest freestanding chimney in the world, after the Ekibastuz GRES-2 Power Station, in Kazakhstan. It is also the second-tallest freestanding structure of any type in Canada, behind the CN Tower but ahead of First Canadian Place. As of 2023, it is the 51st-tallest freestanding structure in the world. The Superstack has a tapered shape as it gets wider near the base reaching a width of 35 meters. It is located on top of the largest nickel smelting operation in the world at Vale's Copper Cliff processing facility in the city of Greater Sudbury.

In 2018, Vale announced that the stack would be decommissioned and dismantled, beginning in 2020. Two new, smaller stacks were constructed under the company's Clean Atmospheric Emissions Reduction Project. In July 2020, Vale announced that the Superstack had been officially taken out of service but would remain operational in standby mode for two more months as a backup in the event of a malfunction in the new system, and that the dismantling of the Superstack would then begin. Although some have called for the stack to be left in place as a tourist attraction, in September 2024, Vale announced an updated plan, which will see the stack dismantled by 2029. Dismantling of the Superstack commenced in September 2025 and as of October 2025 the stack height was reduced by about 35 meters, giving it a current height of approximately ~345 meters. The current height reduction resulted in the Superstack falling from second to eighth place for the tallest chimney in the world. Demolition work is set to begin in May 2026.

In addition to further reducing sulphur dioxide emissions by 85 per cent, the decommissioning of the stack was expected to cut the complex's natural gas consumption in half.

== History ==
The Superstack was built by Inco Limited (and later purchased by Vale) at an estimated cost of 25 million dollars. Construction was delayed by a 13-week labour dispute. Construction on the structure was underway during the Sudbury tornado of August 20, 1970; the structure swayed heavily in the wind but remained standing and suffered only minor damage. Six workers were on top of the construction platform when the storm hit, all of whom survived. The same day was the final day of construction on the stack, with the construction fully completed by the evening of August 21, 1970.

The stack entered full operation in 1972. From the date of its completion until the Ekibastuz GRES-2 chimney was constructed in 1987 in Kazakhstan, it was the world's tallest smokestack. Until the CN Tower's completion in 1975, it was the tallest freestanding structure in Canada for just under 3 years.

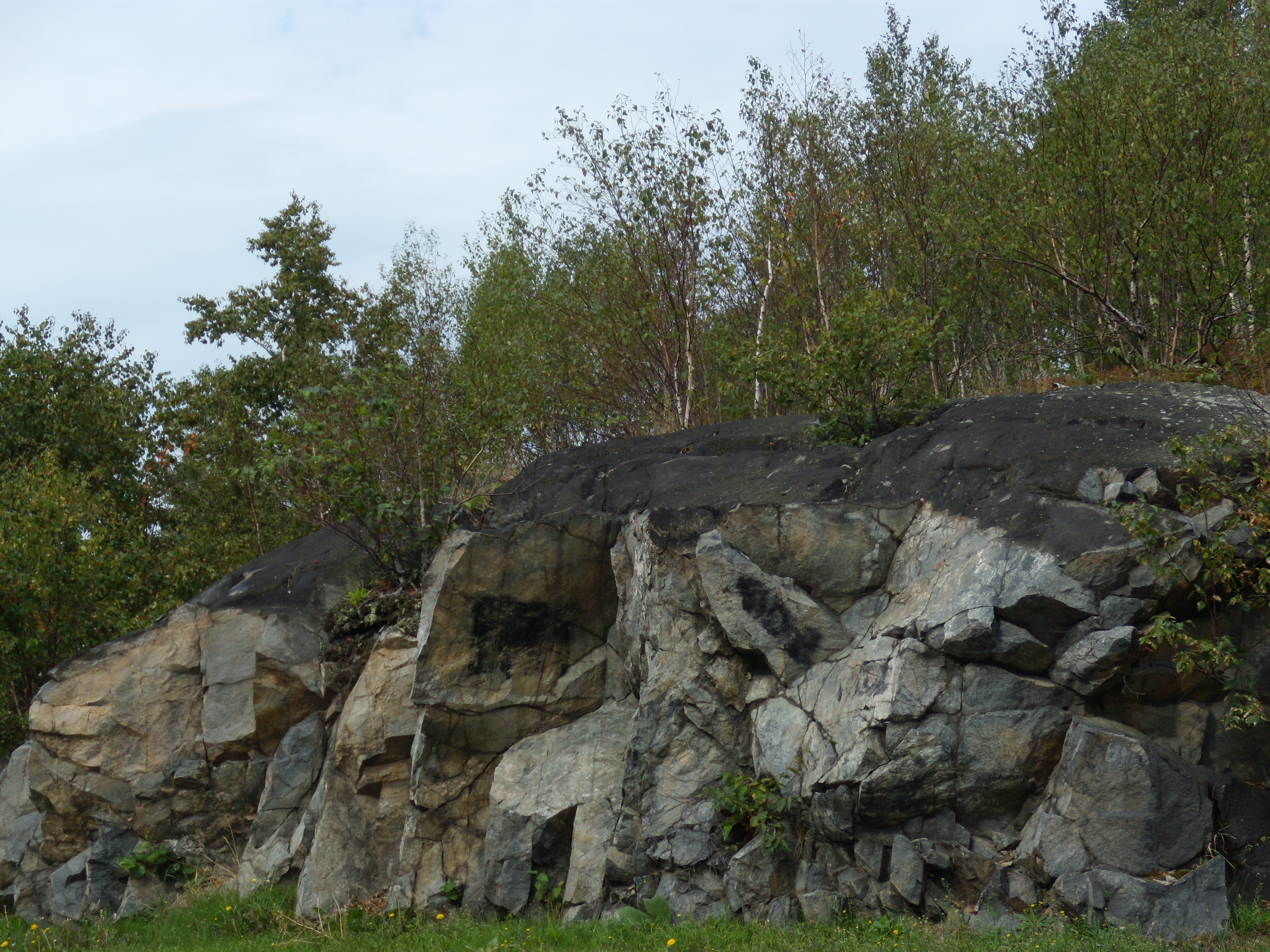
Blackened rocks in 2012

Prior to the construction of the Superstack, the waste gases had contributed to severe local ecological damage. The Copper Cliff smelter was already home to some of the world's tallest stacks, including two 500 ft (150 m) chimneys constructed in 1928-29 and 1936. However, they proved to be insufficient and were compounded by open coke beds in the early-to-mid-20th century and by logging for fuel, which inevitably caused a near-total loss of native vegetation and soil erosion. Of particular interest to geologists are the now-exposed rocky outcrops, which have been permanently stained charcoal black by pollution and acid rain in a layer which penetrates into the once pink-grey granite.

The Superstack was built to disperse sulphur gases and other byproducts of the smelting process away from the city of Sudbury. It did so by placing the gases high in the air, where they normally blew right past the city on the prevailing winds. As a result, the gases could be detected in the atmosphere around Greater Sudbury in a 240 kilometres (150 mi) radius of the Inco plant. The addition of the Superstack and dispersal of sulphur dioxide helped reduce acidity of lakes, however many lakes in the surrounding areas are still highly acidic. Research has shown that the long term decrease in toxic emission will result in rehabiliation for water bodies such as the lakes near Copper Cliff. During the 1970s and 80s, the sulphur dioxide plume formed a permanent, opaque, cloud-like formation running across the entire horizon as seen from a distance. Periodic inversions would cause the plume to fall into the city.

Construction of the Superstack was followed by an environmental reclamation project, which included rehabilitation of existing landscapes and selected water bodies such as Lake Ramsey. An ambitious regreening plan saw over three million new trees planted within the Greater Sudbury area. The application of limestone to soil and lakes was also done to increase pH levels. In 1992, Inco and the city were given an award by the United Nations in honour of their environmental rehabilitation programmes.

On November 3, 2014, Vale announced that it may decide to stop using the stack after a $1 billion project to reduce emissions by 85% negated the need for the stack. If no other use for it was found, Vale was to decommission the Superstack, demolish it, and replace it with a much smaller chimney. In 2017, Vale announced plans to decommission the Superstack upon the construction of two smaller, more energy efficient stacks. On July 28, 2020, Vale updated that news and stated that the Superstack at its Copper Cliff Complex had been taken out of service. It would remain on "hot standby" for about two months while the replacement flue connections were tested, but it would then be demolished over the years.

== Emissions ==
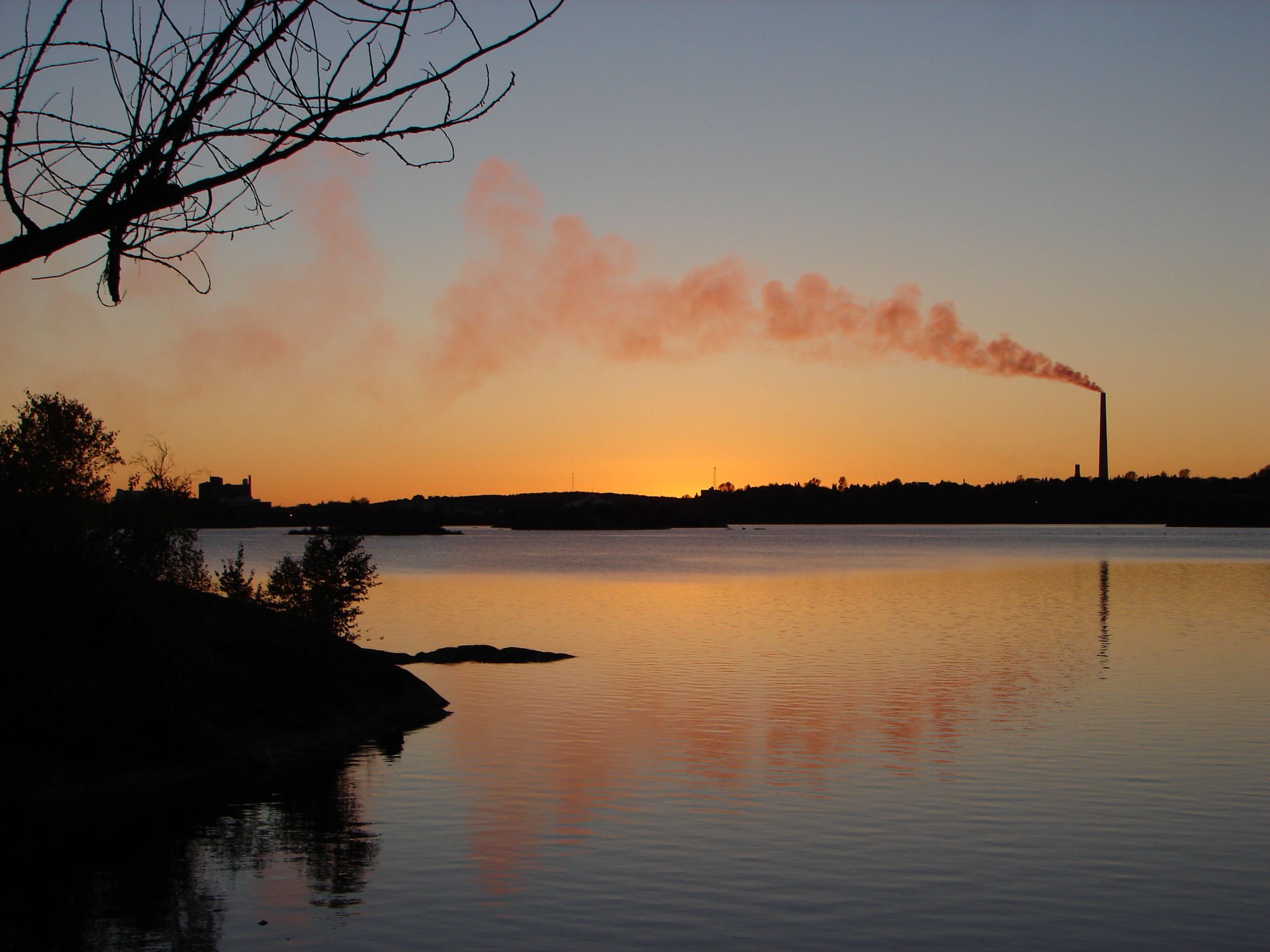
The Inco Superstack dominates the Sudbury skyline.

While the Superstack lowered the ground-level pollution in the city, it dispersed sulphur dioxide and nitrogen dioxide gases over a much larger area. Releasing to nearly one fourth of the total sulphur dioxide produced in Canada, making it a large contributor of pollution. Research from data gleaned up to the late 1980s demonstrated acid rain to have affected the biology of some 7,000 lakes.

Prior to Vale's purchase of Inco, a major construction effort by Inco in the early 1990s dramatically scrubbed waste gases before pumping them up the Superstack. The upgrades were completed in 1994 and emissions have since been significantly reduced. By comparison to the plume prior to installation, the plume now disperses quite rapidly and is often see-through, even at the stack site.

Emissions reductions and increases in thermal efficiency have reached the point that natural draught is no longer sufficient to draw flue gas up the stack and necessitate the use of induced draught fans and/or reheating of the flue gas using natural gas burners.

As well as SO_{2} emissions, Inco's Superstack has had very high arsenic, nickel, and lead emissions to the atmosphere. In 1998, Inco emitted 146.7 tonnes of lead from Copper Cliff while producing 238,500 tonnes of nickel-copper matte. That is 150 times more lead emission than would be permitted by a US EPA-regulated lead smelter producing 238,500 tonnes of lead. As a result of the excessive lead emissions from the Inco Superstack, soil tests of the surrounding community of Copper Cliff was found to have levels of lead that are sufficient to cause harm to young children.

== See also ==
- List of tallest chimneys
- List of tallest structures

Records
Preceded by Chimney of Mitchell Power Plant	World's tallest chimney 380 m (1247 ft); 1971–1987	Succeeded by Ekibastuz GRES-2 Power Station chimney
