= Ekibastuz GRES-2 Power Station =

Power station in Kazakhstan

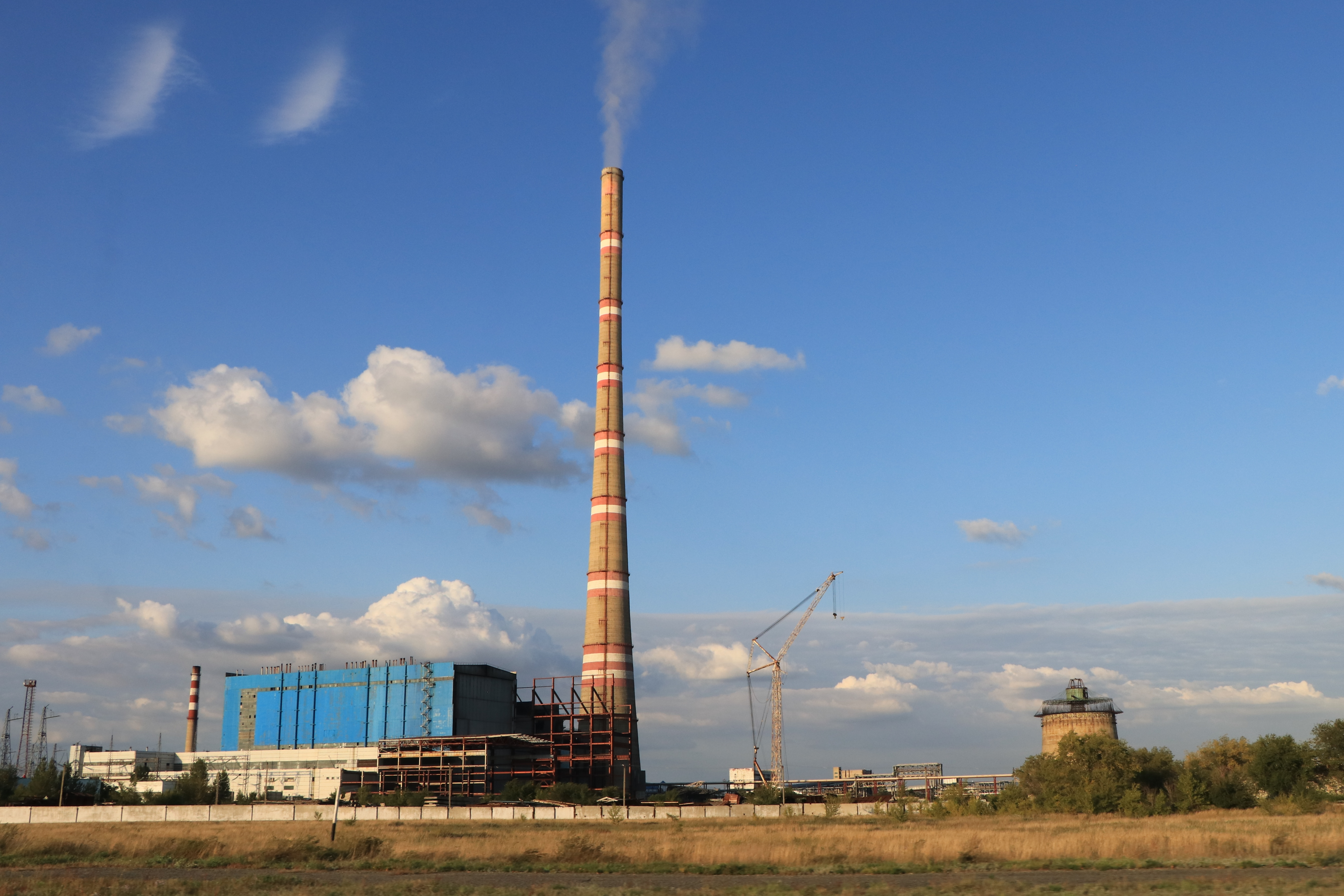
- The GRES-2 Power Plant in Ekibastuz, Kazakhstan
- Country: Kazakhstan
- Location: Ekibastuz
- Coordinates: 52°1′26.3″N 75°28′34.5″E
- Commission date: 1987
- Owners: Inter RAO UES (50%); Government of Kazakhstan (50%)

Thermal power station
- Primary fuel: Coal

Power generation
- Units operational: 2 × 500 MWe
- Nameplate capacity: 1,000 MW

External links
- Website: www.gres2.kz
- Commons: Related media on Commons

The GRES-2 Power Station (or Power Station Ekibastuz) is a coal-fueled power generating station in Ekibastuz, Kazakhstan. It is located close to Solnechny and to Shandaksor. The ashes of the station are dumped into Karasor, a nearby lake. As of 2025, the GRES-1 and GRES-2 power stations in Ekibastuz help to generate over 40% of Kazakhstan's electricity output.

== Description ==
GRES-2, commissioned in 1987, has an installed capacity of 1,000 MWe and has the world's tallest flue-gas stack at 419.7 metres (1,377 ft) tall. The reinforced concrete chimney is about 40 m (130 ft) taller than the Inco Superstack, in Sudbury, Ontario, Canada. It is the tallest chimney ever built.

The power station is the start of the Powerline Ekibastuz–Kokshetau and uses a transmission voltage of 1,150 kVAC, the highest transmission voltage in the world. The extension of the line to Chelyabinsk, Russia, is also designed for 1,150 kV, but it currently operates at only 500 kV. About three fourths of the energy produced by GRES-2 was exported to Russia.

Fifty percent of GRES-2 shares are owned by Inter RAO UES, and fifty percent by Kazakhstan's government.

== Individual units ==
The planned capacity of 4,000 MWe is to be provided by eight equal units, 500 MWe each.

- Unit 1 was launched into service in December 1990.
- Unit 2 was launched into service in December 1993.
- Construction of Unit 3 was started in 1990 but later stopped.

== See also ==
- Ekibastuz GRES-1
- List of chimneys
- List of towers
- List of tallest freestanding structures in the world
- Unfinished building
- List of tallest buildings and structures in the world

Records
Preceded by Inco Superstack; 380 m (1,250 ft)	World's tallest chimney 1987–present	Incumbent
