= Ekibastuz–Kokshetau high-voltage line =

Electric power line in Kazakhstan

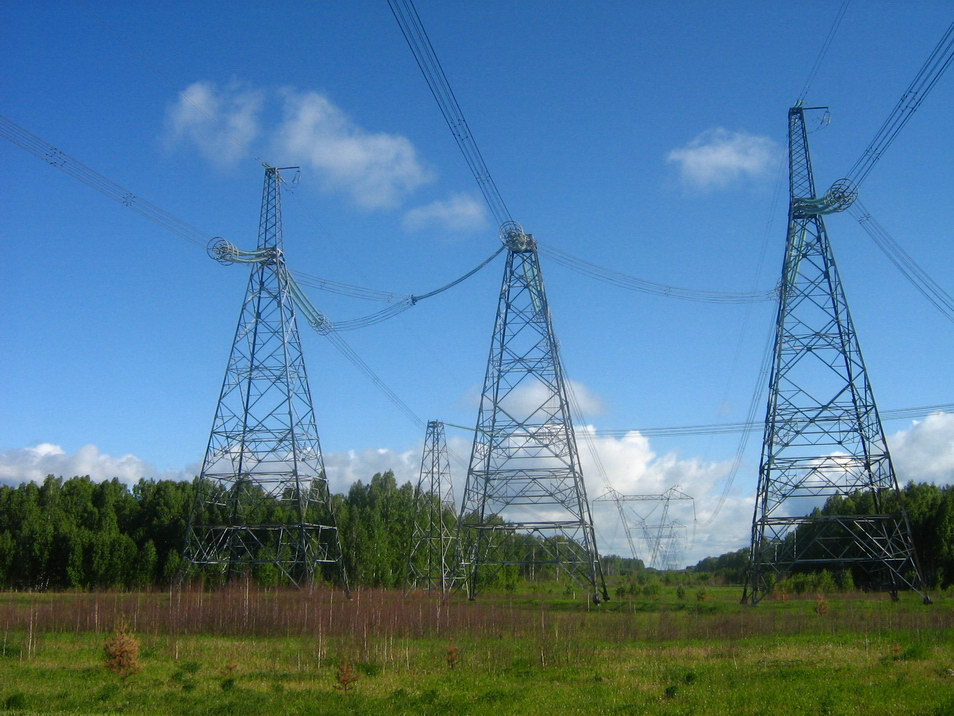

Location
- Country: Kazakhstan
- Coordinates: 51°52′51″N 75°12′59″E; 53°19′4″N 68°55′02″E
- From: Ekibastuz
- To: Kokshetau

Ownership information
- Operator: KEGOC

Construction information
- Construction started: 1980
- Commissioned: 1985

Technical information
- Type: Overhead power line
- Current type: AC
- Total length: 432 km (268 mi)
- Capacity: 5,500 MW (original)
- AC voltage: 1,150 kV (original); 500 kV (current)

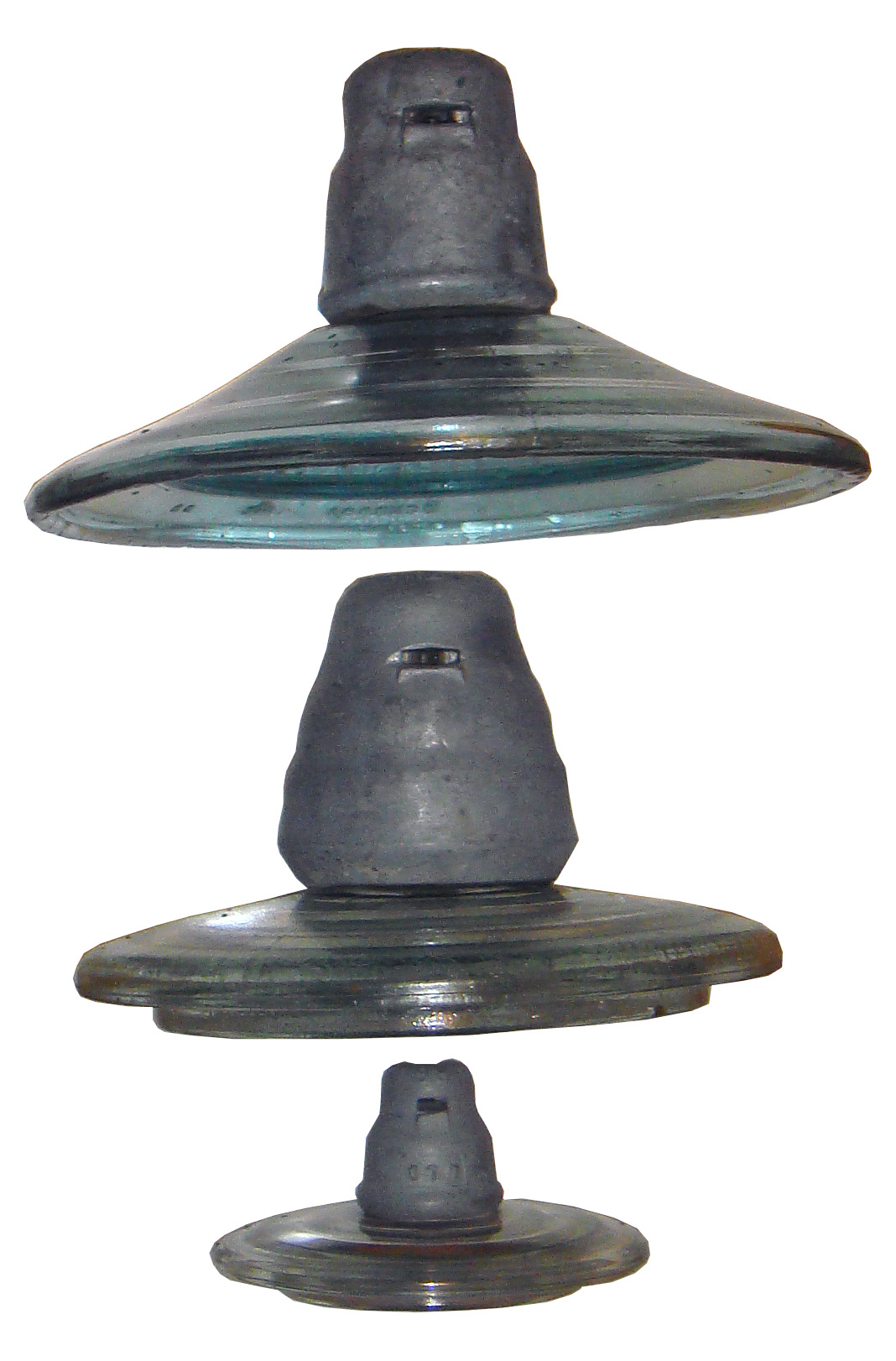
PSK-300A and PS-400A (U400A) disc suspension insulators used on 1150 kV powerlines in comparison with common U70BL insulator

The Ekibastuz–Kokshetau high-voltage line is an alternating current electrical power transmission line in Kazakhstan from Ekibastuz to Kokshetau. It was the first commercially used power line in the world which operated at 1,150 kV, the highest transmission line voltage in the world. It is a part of the Itatsk (Sharypovo)–Barnaul–Ekibastuz–Kokshetau–Kostanay–Chelyabinsk (Siberia–Kazakhstan–Urals) transmission system, which was designed to transfer electricity from Siberia and Kazakhstan to industrial regions in the Urals.

Designated as power line number 1101, it runs 432 kilometres (268 mi) from Ekibastuz to Kokshetau. It is mounted on transmission towers with an average height of 45 metres (148 ft). The weight of the conductors between the spans is approximately 50 tons. With a voltage of 1,150 kV, the line had a maximum transfer capacity of 5,500 MW.

The whole length of the Siberia–Kazakhstan–Urals line is 2,344 kilometres (1,456 mi), of which 1,421 kilometres (883 mi) is located in Kazakhstan and the rest is located in Russia.

== History ==
In 1973, the Soviet Union built a three-phase UHV experimental test circuit over a kilometre long at the Beily Rast substation, near Dmitrov in Moscow region. In 1978, a 270 km UHV test line for industrial use was built from Sharypovo to Novokuznetsk. In 1985, this test line became part of the Siberia–Urals line. At the time, no other country had an operational UHV line of this voltage, although several other countries were running experiments.

On 24 March 1977, the Central Committee of the Communist Party of the Soviet Union and the Council of Ministers of the Soviet Union took a decision to construct the Ekibastuz–Centre (Tambov) 1,500 kV direct current line. This line was put under construction but never finished. In addition, the Ekibastuz–Urals line was planned. Construction of this line started in 1980. The Ekibastuz–Kokshetau line was commissioned at the end of July 1985. The technical design of the line was done by Energosetproekt. The main contractor was Specsetstroy, while contractors for the 1,150 kV substations were Ekibastuzenergostroy and Yuzhuralenergostroy. Equipment for substations was provided by Zaporozhtransformator, Elektrosila, and Uralelektrotyazhmash.

In 1988, this 1,150 kV line was extended to Kostanay. By 1990, the whole line from Barnaul to Chelyabinsk was built; however, as 1,150 kV substations were built only in the territory of Kazakhstan, the rest of this system operated at 500 kV. After dissolution of the Soviet Union in 1991, the whole Siberia–Urals transmission system was downgraded to 500 kV. In 1998, the Siberia–Urals line was extended from Barnaul to Itatsk.

== Sites ==
Name	Coordinates
Chelyabinsk	54°59′29″N 60°40′40″E
Kostanay	53°4′37″N 63°20′46″E
Kokshetau	53°19′4″N 68°55′02″E
Ekibastuz	51°52′51″N 75°12′59″E
Barnaul	53°34′28″N 83°40′4″E
Sharypovo	55°26′11″N 89°04′25″E

== Bibliography ==
- Research Institute of Development Assistance (Japan), Regional cooperation in central Asia : focusing on infrastructure development, The Overseas Economic Cooperation Fund, Japan, Research Papers No. 27, July 1998 OCLC 40657952.
- Liu, Zhenya (2014). Ultra-high Voltage AC/DC Grids. Academic Press. ISBN 9780128021613.
- Liu, Zhenya (2015). Global Energy Interconnection. Academic Press. ISBN 9780128044063.
