= Solnechny (Pavlodar Region) =

Village in Pavlodar Region, Kazakhstan

Solnechny Солнечный
- Village
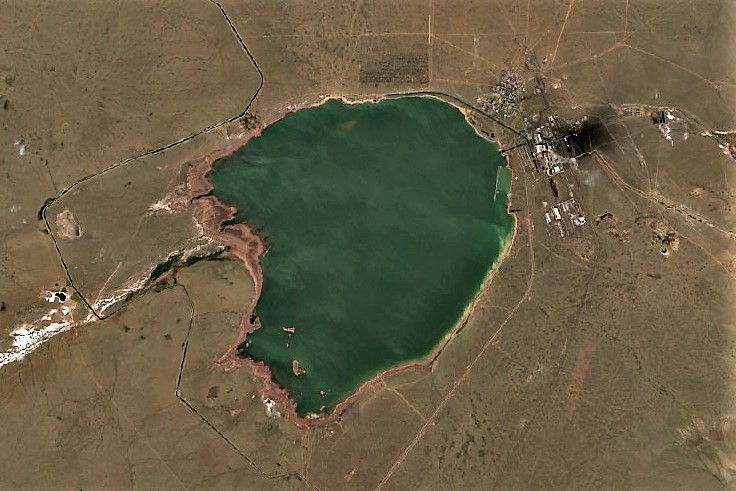
- Solnechny in the upper right

- Location in Kazakhstan
- Coordinates: 52°02′00″N 75°28′00″E
- Country: Kazakhstan
- Region: Pavlodar Region
- City administration: Ekibastuz City Administration
- Established: 1987

Population (2019)
  - Total: 5,821
- Time zone: UTC+5
- Postcode: 141216

Solnechny (Kazakh: Солнечный; Russian: Солнечный) is a village in the Ekibastuz City Administration, Pavlodar Region, Kazakhstan. It is the center and only populated unit of Solnechny Rural District (KATO code - 552253100).

Population: 4,892 (2009 census results); 8,881 (1999 census results).

== Geography ==
Solnechny is located 172 km (107 mi) west of Pavlodar and 42 km (26 mi) north of Ekibastuz. It lies near lake Shandaksor and the Ekibastuz GRES-2 Power Station.
