= Bucko Lake Mine =

Nickel mine in Manitoba, Canada

- Location within Manitoba
- Location: Manitoba, Canada; 54.878°N 98.657°W
- Opened: 2009
- Company: CaNickel Mining Ltd

Bucko Lake Mine is a nickel mine near Wabowden, Manitoba, Canada and is owned by CaNickel Mining LTD previously Crowflight Minerals who purchased the property in November 2008 from Xstrata. Production began on 10 June 2009.
