= Wabowden =

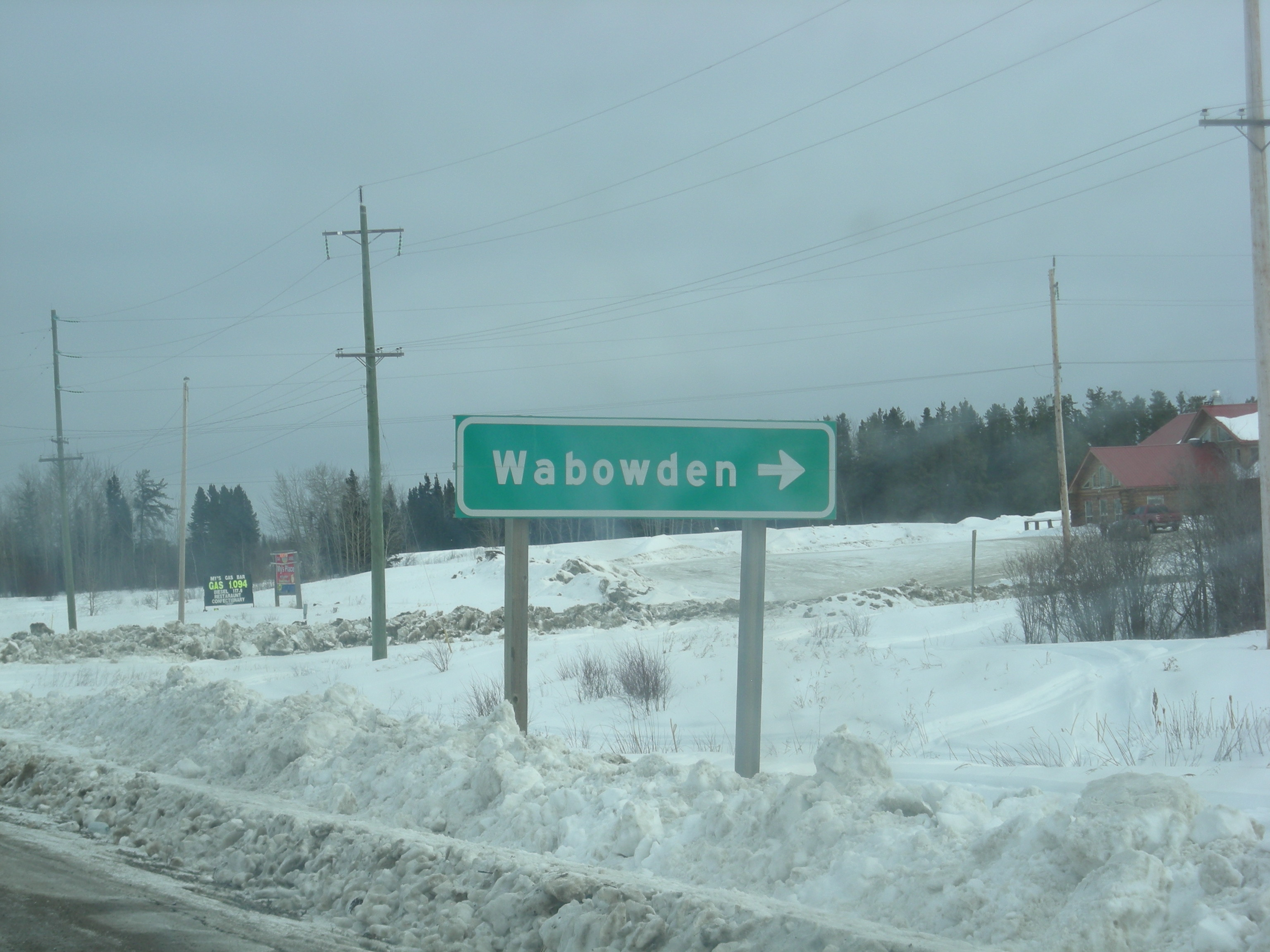
- Sign for Wabowden, Manitoba, Canada

- Boundaries

- Location in Manitoba
- Coordinates: 54°54′32″N 98°37′47″W
- Country: Canada
- Province: Manitoba
- Region: Nor - Man

Government
  - MP: Niki Ashton
  - MLA: Eric Redhead

Area
  - Total: 34.42 km^{2} (13.29 sq mi)

Population (2016 Census)
  - Total: 442
  - Density: 12.8/km^{2} (33/sq mi)
- Time zone: UTC−6 (CST)
  - Summer (DST): UTC−5 (CDT)
- Postal code: R0B 1S0
- Area code: 204
- NTS Map: 063J15
- GNBC Code: GBCTE
- Website: Community of Wabowden

Wabowden is a community in northern Manitoba, Canada. It is situated on Provincial Trunk Highway No. 6, which is the main route between Thompson and the provincial capital, Winnipeg.

== History ==
The community originated in the early 20th century as a service point on the Hudson Bay Railway. Although the railway's presence in Wabowden has diminished over time, it continues to serve the community by transporting freight and passengers. Today, Wabowden is served by Via Rail's Winnipeg–Churchill train.

Wabowden's name is derived from that of a one-time railway executive, W.A. Bowden.

== Demographics ==
In the 2021 Census of Population conducted by Statistics Canada, Wabowden had a population of 400 living in 138 of its 175 total private dwellings, a change of −9.5% from its 2016 population of 442. With a land area of 30.36 km^{2} (11.72 sq mi), it had a population density of 13.2/km^{2} (34.1/sq mi) in 2021.

== Climate ==
In spite of its latitude below the 55th parallel, Wabowden has a clear-cut rather than borderline subarctic climate. Its climate is dominated by its long and bitterly cold winters, but the short summers are relatively warm, keeping Wabowden well below the tree line.

Climate data for Wabowden
Month	Jan	Feb	Mar	Apr	May	Jun	Jul	Aug	Sep	Oct	Nov	Dec	Year
Record high °C (°F)	3 (37)	7 (45)	14 (57)	30 (86)	32 (90)	34 (93)	34 (93)	32 (90)	30 (86)	25 (77)	12 (54)	4 (39)	34 (93)
Mean daily maximum °C (°F)	−18 (0)	−15 (5)	−5 (23)	4 (39)	12 (54)	17 (63)	22 (72)	20 (68)	13 (55)	6 (43)	−6 (21)	−15 (5)	3 (37)
Daily mean °C (°F)	−22 (−8)	−20 (−4)	−11 (12)	−2 (28)	6 (43)	11 (52)	16 (61)	14 (57)	8 (46)	2 (36)	−9 (16)	−18 (0)	−2 (28)
Mean daily minimum °C (°F)	−27 (−17)	−26 (−15)	−18 (0)	−8 (18)	0 (32)	5 (41)	10 (50)	8 (46)	4 (39)	−1 (30)	−13 (9)	−22 (−8)	−7 (19)
Record low °C (°F)	−46 (−51)	−44 (−47)	−37 (−35)	−30 (−22)	−14 (7)	−5 (23)	1 (34)	−1 (30)	−8 (18)	−16 (3)	−36 (−33)	−43 (−45)	−46 (−51)
Average rainfall mm (inches)	10 (0.4)	10 (0.4)	10 (0.4)	20 (0.8)	30 (1.2)	70 (2.8)	80 (3.1)	60 (2.4)	60 (2.4)	20 (0.8)	20 (0.8)	10 (0.4)	450 (17.7)

== Mining ==
Crowflight Minerals is currently preparing Bucko Lake Mine for rehabilitation. The mine shaft was developed in the 1970s by Falconbridge Limited.

== Local media ==
- CBWMT (channel 10) (CBC)

== Notable people ==
- Ernest Monias, musician
