= Raglan Agreement =

The Raglan Agreement, signed in 1995, was the first Impact Benefit Agreement (IBA) in Canada to be negotiated and signed directly between a mining company and the Aboriginal group that would be ultimately affected by the mining operation.

== Raglan Mine ==
The Raglan mine is located in Nunavik, Quebec’s northernmost region. There has been exploration of the Nunavik Region’s mineral resources since the early 1930s. It was not until the 1990s, with an upswing in the global mineral market, that a real and concerted effort to explore arctic Quebec’s resources began. In 1992 a feasibility study of the future Raglan mine was conducted with positive results. Between 1992 and 1995 negotiations between the interested Inuit parties of Nunavik and the Mining company (Falconbridge Ltd) Canadian representatives began.

The Raglan Agreement was signed in January 1995. On signing, construction began on the facilities of the Raglan Mine. The actual mining operations began at the end of 1997. While it was originally estimated that the Raglan mine would operate for 15 years, with expansions over the years and potential future expansions, it is now estimated that the Raglan Mine could operate for an additional 15 years (a potential total of 30+ years).

Currently Raglan’s operations are massive. The entire mine spans 70 km from one end to the other. There are three underground mines in operation with the construction and beginnings of operations of two open pit mines. Each year Raglan extracts and treats about 1.3 million tonnes of ore, or about 3.6 tonnes per day.

== Mine operations ==
Raglan Mine’s main mineral productions are nickel and copper. Some cobalt, palladium, and platinum are also present but in insufficient quantities for commercial mining purposes.

After the mineral ore is extracted from the mines, the on site processing facility crushes, grinds, and treats it. The result is a nickel-copper concentrate, which is then transported by truck north of the Raglan site to coast at Deception Bay. From Deception Bay the concentrate is shipped by water to Sudbury, Ontario for smelting. Finally the smelted material is shipped to Norway for refining into usable product, metal product.

== Background ==
The Raglan exploration and mine is in Northern Quebec. The negotiations and signing of the agreement were done in the context of the 1975 James Bay and Northern Quebec Agreement (JBNQA). The JBNQA has an aspect of land claims and requirements of negotiations with Aboriginal groups. However, the land on which the Raglan Mine was to be situated was not on any "claimed" land nor directly overlapping an Inuit community; therefore, the requirement of negotiation or the creation of an IBA was not met.

However, keeping in mind the remote northern location of the Raglan Mine, the mining company was limited in their options in terms of transport of the mined materials. The easiest (relatively) and cheapest method was to truck to Deception Bay and ship over water from the coast. Unlike the land, Inuit communities claimed “to have rights, titles, claims, and interests in the offshore areas”. Meaning the waters surrounding Deception Bay and further down the coast were claimed or under negotiation with the Government of Canada for claims. It was these coastal and water claims that made it necessary for the mining company to negotiate with the Interested Inuit parties and ultimately create the Raglan Agreement.

== Signatories ==
There are 6 signatories to the Raglan agreement.

=== Makivik Corporation ===
An incorporated body whose general mandate is to “protect the rights, interests, and financial compensation” of the Nunavik Inuit groups under the JBNQA.

=== Qarqalik Landholding Corporation of Salluit ===
A corporation whose mandate is to administer the landholding interests of the Salluit Inuit beneficiaries.

=== Northern Village Corporation of Salluit ===
An incorporated “body politic” whose mandate is to “act and represent” the Salluit community and has the capacity to “execute [the Raglan] agreement”.

=== Nunatulik Landholding Corporation of Kangiqsujuaq ===
A corporation whose mandate is to administer the landholding interests of the Kangiqsujuaq Inuit beneficiaries.

=== Northern Village Corporation of Kangiqsujuaq ===
An incorporated “body politic” whose mandate is to “act and represent” the Kanqiqsujuaq community and has the capacity to “execute [the Raglan] agreement”.

=== Société Minière Raglan du Québec Ltée ===
The Quebec incorporated body representing the mining company.

Falconbridge Ltd (the head mining company) was not a signatory but acted as an intervener.

== Contents ==
There are six substantive sections of the Raglan Agreement (note there are 8 other sections which detail definitions, technical descriptions, operating procedures etc…). Below is a brief outline of each section; for more detailed content, please read the Raglan Agreement (link provided in sources).

1. Environment and Mitigation
  This section outlines the foreseen impacts of the mining project and the mitigating measures in place. It also lays out the procedure for handling unforeseen impacts and monitoring ongoing environmental concerns.
  As an example of the recognition of environmental impacts and mitigating measures the Raglan agreement states: “In the event that there are impacts that result from the Raglan Project that are not described [...] or in the event that the scope or significance of a foreseen impact described [...] is determined [...] to be materially greater than as described therein, Société Minière shall carry out such additional mitigating work as may be to require, eliminate, diminish or reduce to a level of significance that is mutually satisfactory to the parties”.
2. Inuit Training and Employment
  This section adopts a “human resource strategy” that makes provisions for the training, recruitment, hiring priority, employment, employment support systems (including discrimination policies), evaluation of the human resource strategy by the Raglan committee, and finally the provision for alternative employment upon permanent closing of the mine.
3. Inuit Enterprises
  Provides for the priority use of Inuit Enterprises by the mining company.
4. Financial Provisions
  Provides that the Inuit beneficiaries derive a direct economic benefit from the Raglan Mine in the form of a profit sharing program. It is estimated that the “mine’s direct contribution to Nunavik’s economy is forecast to be $130 million by the end of 2007”.
5. Raglan Committee
  Outlines the form and function of the Raglan Committee, whose mandate it is to ensure the enforcement of the Raglan Agreement and facilitate communication between all parties. There are six members of the Raglan Committee, with three Inuit representatives and three Raglan representatives.
6. Dispute Resolution
  Sets out the procedure for resolving disputes if the Raglan Committee is unable to come to an agreement. It includes a provision for mediation and arbitration.
