= Fording Canadian Coal Trust =

- Company type: Public (TSX: FDG.UN; NYSE: FDG); Royalty trust
- Industry: Mining
- Founded: 2003
- Defunct: 2008
- Fate: Takeover
- Successor: Teck Cominco
- Headquarters: Calgary, Alberta, Canada
- Key people: Michael A. Grandin; Boyd Payne (President)
- Products: Bituminous coal
- Number of employees: 1,855 (2008)

Fording Canadian Coal Trust (NYSE: FDG; TSX:FDG) was a Canadian-based royalty trust which owned a 60% stake in the Elk Valley Coal Partnership (EVCP), which in turn produced hard-coking metallurgical coal, primarily for steel production, at its facility in Elk Valley, British Columbia. Through the EVCP it also owned a 46% interest in Neptune Bulk Terminals (Canada) Ltd., which operates a dedicated coal berth at the Port of Vancouver. Its market capitalization was $11-billion USD in 2008.

The trust was formed in 2003 to assemble various assets from Luscar Ltd./CONSOL Energy Canada Ltd. joint ventures, Teck Cominco Ltd., and the former Fording Coal Ltd. (which was originally a unit of Canadian Pacific Railway until October 2001).

On July 29, 2008, Teck Cominco announced an agreement with Fording to purchase 100% of its assets; Teck Cominco had been the minority owner of the Elk Valley Coal Partnership, with a 40% stake. The purchase was closed on October 30, 2008, with a final cost of $14-billion USD to Teck. Elk Valley Coal Corporation will be renamed Teck Coal Limited.
