= Bely Rast High Voltage Research Station =

Facility for the development of high voltage equipment in Russia

Bely Rast Research Station
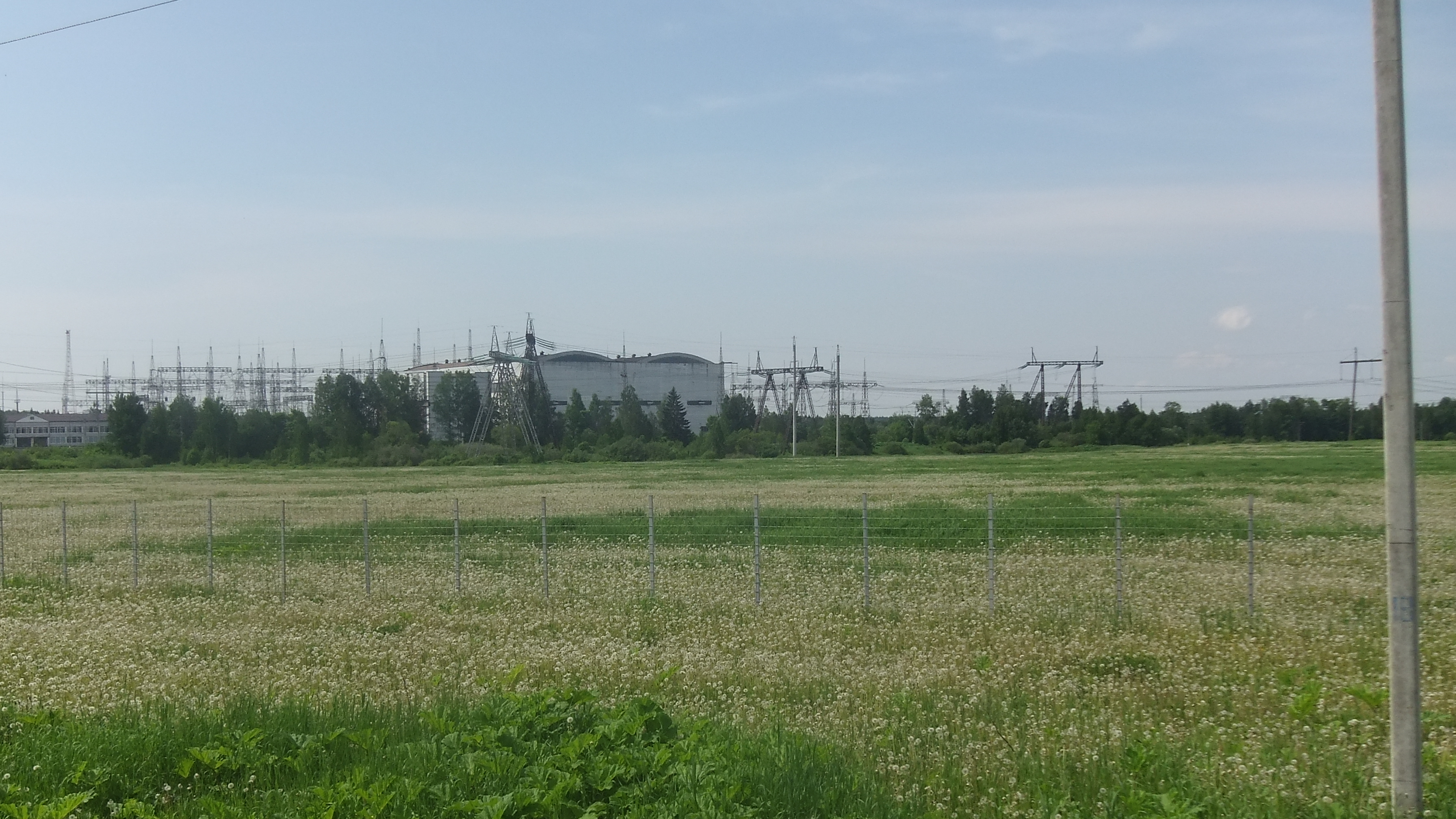

- Location within Russia

General information
- Location: Bely Rast, Dmitrovsky District, Moscow Oblast, Russia
- Coordinates: 56°7′24″N 37°26′23″E
- Opened: 1966

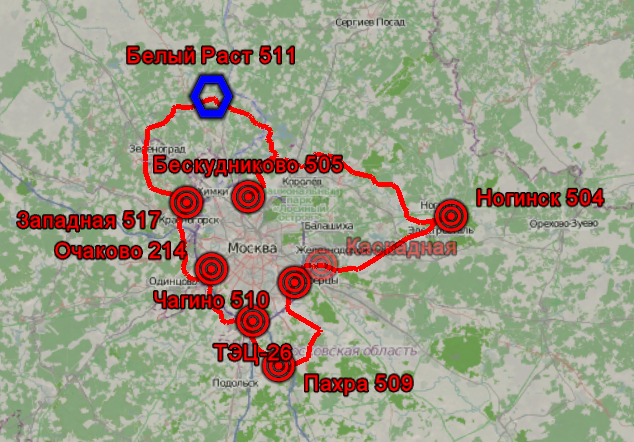
Map of the Moscow Power Ring. Bely Rast is shown with a blue hexagon.

Bely Rast High Voltage Research Station (Russian: Белый Раст) is a facility for the development of high voltage equipment in Russia, situated at Bely Rast, Moscow Oblast near the eponymous station of the Greater Ring of the Moscow Railway. Built in 1966, the equipment of the 750 kV- and 1150 kV-lines in Russia and other parts of the former Soviet Union were first developed and tested at this facility, as well as the equipment for the never completed HVDC Ekibastuz–Centre. The facility also has an unused 1150 kV AC and a 1500 kV DC line. The DC line was the prototype of the never finished HVDC Ekibastuz–Centre.
