= Birchtree Mine =

Nickel mine in Manitoba, Canada

- Location in Manitoba
- Location: Thompson, Manitoba, Canada; 55°42′06″N 097°55′37″W
- Products: Nickel
- Opened: 1965
- Active: 1965 - 1978; 1988 - 2017
- Closed: 2017
- Company: Vale Inco
- Website: Vale Inco

Birchtree Mine is an underground nickel mine, owned and operated by Vale Inco in the city of Thompson, Manitoba, Canada. It lies in the nickel containing Thompson Belt, a geologic feature associated with the Circum-Superior Belt large igneous province throughout the Superior craton.

== History ==
Birchtree mine originally opened in 1965 until 1978 when it was put in "standby" until 1988. The mine reopened again in 1989. In 2000, Inco authorized US$48 million to deepen the mine to 4,100 feet (1,250 m), expanding production to 3,800 tons per day. The Deepening Project allowed Inco to access ore between the 3950 level and 2300 level. In 2002, Birchtree Mine started producing ore from between 2750 level and 2300 level. In 2003, the first ore was extracted between the 3950 and 3450 level.

== Safety ==
In 2005, Birchtree mine was the recipient of the John T. Ryan Trophy for having achieving the lowest accident frequency of all Canadian metal mines. In 2008, it received the regional John T. Ryan trophy for the Prairies & Northwest Territories.
