= Vale Canada =

Majority owned subsidiary of the Brazilian mining company Vale

Vale Canada Limited
- Type: Majority owned subsidiary
- Industry: Mining
- Predecessor: Inco
- Founded: 4 January 2007
- Headquarters: Toronto, Ontario, Canada
- Products: Nickel, copper, cobalt, PGMs
- Revenue: ▲US$ 8.3 billion (2012)
- Net income: ▲US$ 3.8 Billion (2012)
- Number of employees: 12,000
- Parent: Vale
- Subsidiaries: PT Vale Indonesia (34.1%)
- Website: vale.com/canada

Vale Canada Limited, doing business as Vale Base Metals, is a majority owned subsidiary of the Brazilian mining company Vale with Manara Minerals holding a 10 per cent minority share. The company was created from the former Inco, which Vale acquired in 2007. Vale's nickel mining and metals division is headquartered in London with a corporate center in Toronto. It produces nickel, copper, cobalt, and other Platinum Group Metals. Prior to being purchased by CVRD (now Vale) in 2006, Inco was the world's second largest producer of nickel, and the third largest mining company outside South Africa and Russia of platinum group metals. It was also a charter member of the 30-stock Dow Jones Industrial Average formed on October 1, 1928.

== History ==
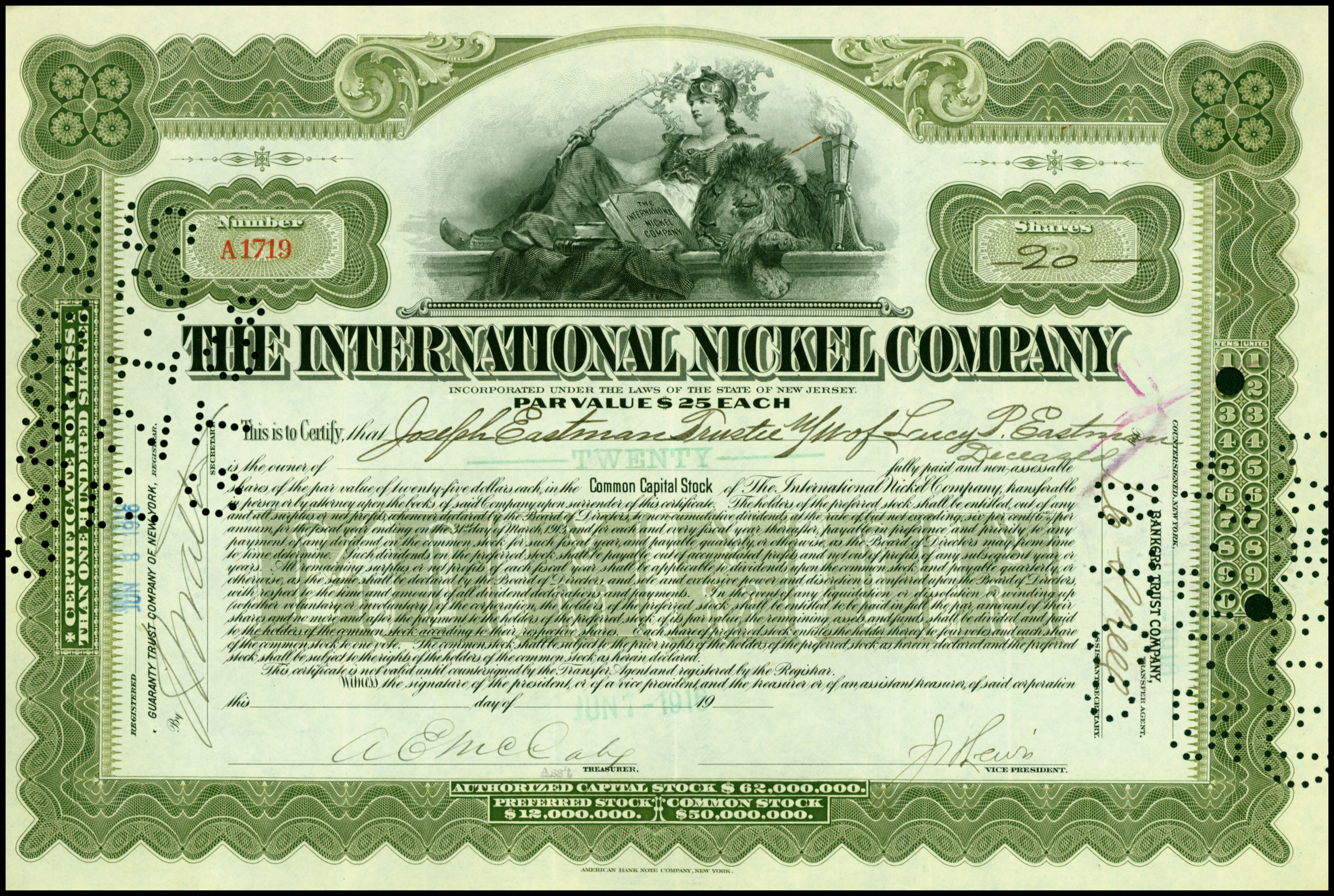
Share of the International Nickel Company, issued 7 June 1916

=== Takeovers (2005–2006) ===
Transitional "Vale Inco" logo

On October 11, 2005, Inco's CEO Scott Hand announced a friendly takeover bid to buy out the operations of longtime rival Falconbridge for $12 billion. If approved, the deal would have made Inco the world's largest producer of nickel. Davis's Xstrata (which already owned ~20% of Falconbridge shares) subsequently submitted a hostile takeover bid for Falconbridge, resulting in a bidding war between Inco and Xstrata. The Xstrata bid was successful, but not before Falconbridge employed a poison pill to delay the acquisition, raising its share price from $28 to $62.50 in the meantime.

Teck Cominco submitted a hostile takeover bid to purchase Inco on May 8, 2006 for $16 billion if it agreed to abandon its takeover of Falconbridge. On June 26 of the same year, Phelps Dodge submitted a friendly takeover bid to purchase a combined Inco and Falconbridge for around $40 billion; that offer was also withdrawn because of the failure of the Inco-Falconbridge merger.

On August 14, 2006 Brazilian mining company Vale S.A. (aka CVRD) extended an all-cash offer to buy Inco for $17 billion. That offer received approval from the Canadian government's investment review agency on October 19, and was accepted by Inco shareholders on October 23. Part of the takeover deal was that CVRD would operate Inco as a separate nickel mining division; all of CVRD's nickel operations, including mines at Onca Puma and Vermelho in Brazil, were transferred to Inco's management. Inco was delisted from the NYSE on November 16, 2006 and the TSX on January 5, 2007. According to its current web site, Inco is now a wholly owned subsidiary of Vale (formerly CVRD).

=== As subsidiary ===
The 2009-10 Vale-Inco strike lasted 15 months; one of the longest on record in Canada.

In May 2010, Vale changed the name of Vale-Inco to simply Vale, stating the change is "a milestone that aligns it more fully with other Vale operations worldwide and reflects its position as part of the world's second largest mining company".

In 2015, Vale was said to be exploring an IPO of its base metals unit for $30–35 billion, in order to lighten its debt load.

=== Reorganisation as VBM ===
In May 2023 it was announced that Mark Cutifani would be appointed as Chair of the new Vale Base Metals (VBM) subsidiary of global mining giant Vale S.A. Vale was looking to divest from its tar baby, as early as December 2022. At the time VBM was a supplier to Tesla and General Motors (GM). Reports were afoot that GM, Mitsui, and the Saudi Public Investment Fund were interested buyers of a 10% stake. Former Tesla executive Jerome Guillen would join the "energy transition board" of VBM along with Cutifani.

In May 2023 it was announced that VBM had entered a joint venture with the Ford Motor Company and Huayou Cobalt on a $4.5bn nickel processing facility in Indonesia.

Vale spun out its metals business as a separate ringfenced entity headquartered in Toronto, with an independent board chaired by Cutifani. That process completed in July 2023. The unit was then one of the world's largest producers of nickel, copper, and cobalt, and had operations across the globe. The parent company's chief executive Eduardo Bartolomeo stated that Cutifani could help the division explore a future “liquidity event”. In early 2023, the parent company earned 80% of its profits in its South American iron mines, and the balance from its Base Metals group.

In July 2023 Cutifani sold off 10% of the capital to the Saudi Public Investment Fund and 3% to Engine No. 1. The value of the transaction was $3.4 billion.

As of May 2024, Vale Canada was reported to have a sales agreement with "Xstrata Copper Canada" for the sale of copper anodes and copper concentrates produced in Sudbury.

== Criticism ==
In 2006 Inco was removed from the FTSE4Good Index for failing to meet their human rights criteria. The company has had disputes with native groups and environmental concerns over mine runoff.

== Labour relations ==
Employees for Inco in Canada are represented by the United Steelworkers throughout all the mergers. Because of the mergers, the United Steelworkers signed an agreement with all the unions that represent mining workers in countries where Vale/Inco operate to "work together cooperatively and strategically as global partners, to build the bargaining power of worker." The unions include Confederação Nacional dos Trabalhadores no Setor Minera, SINTICIM, Union syndicale des ouvriers et employés de Nouvelle-Calédonie, Union des Syndicats des Travailleurs Kanak et Exploités, Fagforbundet for Industri og Energi, Construction, Forestry, Mining and Energy Union, and the United Steelworkers.

== Current operations ==
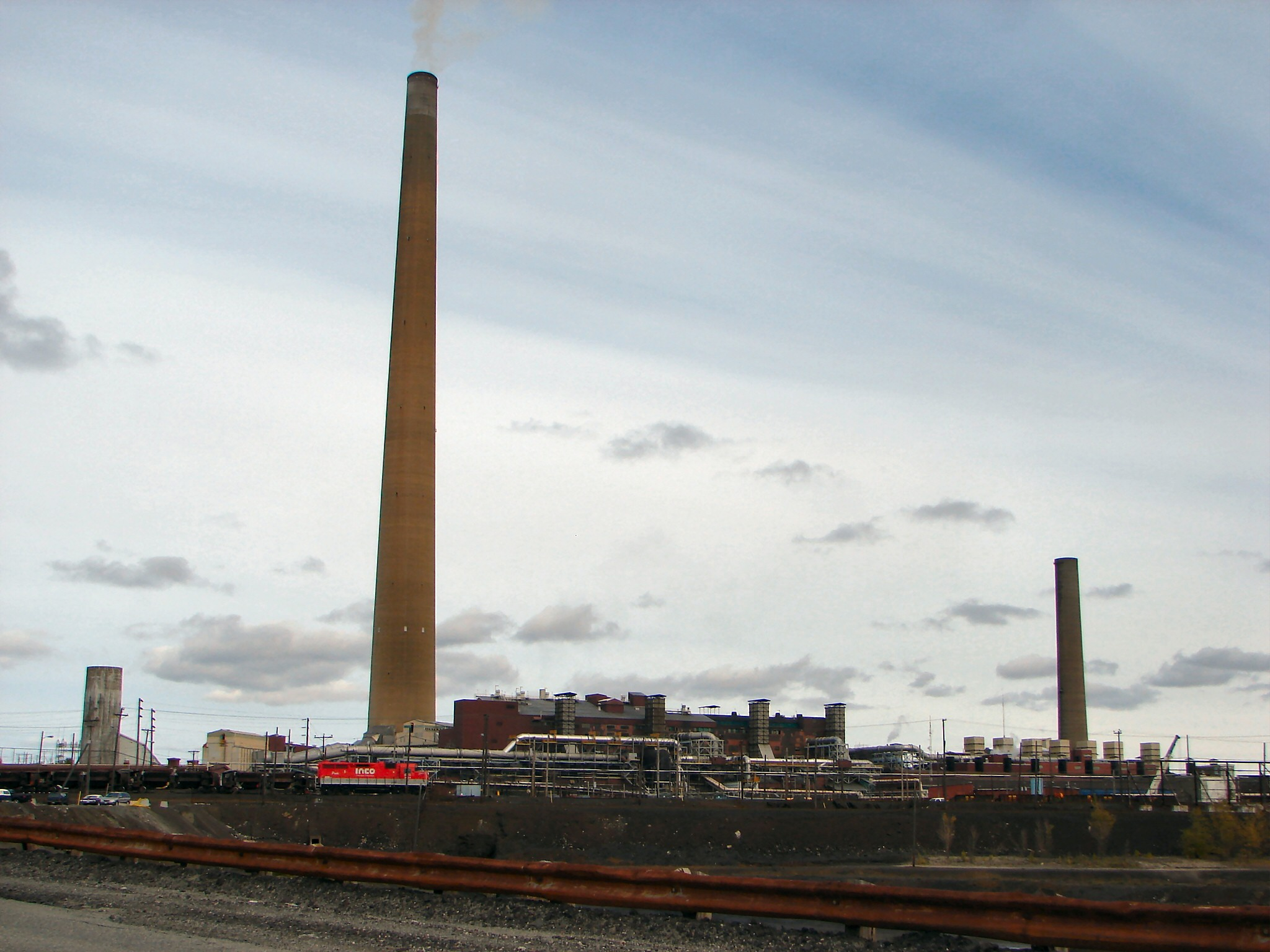
The INCO Superstack at the Vale Copper Cliff smelter in Sudbury.

=== Ontario, Canada ===
- Coleman Mine, Vale's flagship nickel mine
- Copper Cliff North Mine
- Copper Cliff South Mine
- Creighton Mine
- Garson Mine
- Port Colborne Refinery
- Clarabelle Mill
- Totten mine
- Copper Cliff Smelter
- Copper Cliff Nickel Refinery

=== Manitoba, Canada ===
- Birchtree Mine
- Thompson Mine

=== Newfoundland and Labrador, Canada ===
- Voisey's Bay Mine
- Long Harbour Nickel Processing Plant

=== Indonesia ===
- Vale Inco's Indonesian joint venture PT Vale Indonesia Tbk, an Indonesian company which is 20 percent publicly owned (IDX:INCO), is located in Sorowako. In August 2011, a dispute began because PT Inco broke its promise to build 2 smelters in Pomala and Bahodopi in 2005 and 2010 respectively, and to hand over 50,000 hectares of its 118,000-hectare concession to locals. Based on the latest feasibility study, only the Bahodopi smelter facility was possible. The dispute might go to court.
- October 11, 2011: After starting operation of its third hydropower plant at Karebbe with an output of 130 megawatts (MW), the company would increase production from 73,000 metric tons to 120,000 metric tons per year over the next five years. The first and second hydropower plants are located in Larona and Balambano with a combined output of 365 MW. As part of its Corporate Social Responsibility plan, the company has given a total of 8 MW from the plants to Perusahaan Listrik Negara (Indonesian Government Electric Company) for free.

=== New Caledonia ===
- Vale Inco New Caledonia

== In popular culture ==
Inco is a central theme in the Stompin' Tom Connors song "Sudbury Saturday Night". More recently, the Creighton Mine, owned by Vale and hosting the Sudbury Neutrino Observatory, figures largely in the plot of Robert J. Sawyer's Neanderthal Parallax trilogy.

== See also ==
- 1978 Inco strike
- 2009–2010 Vale Inco strike
