= Copper Cliff =

Coordinates: 46°28′23″N 81°04′10″W

- Community
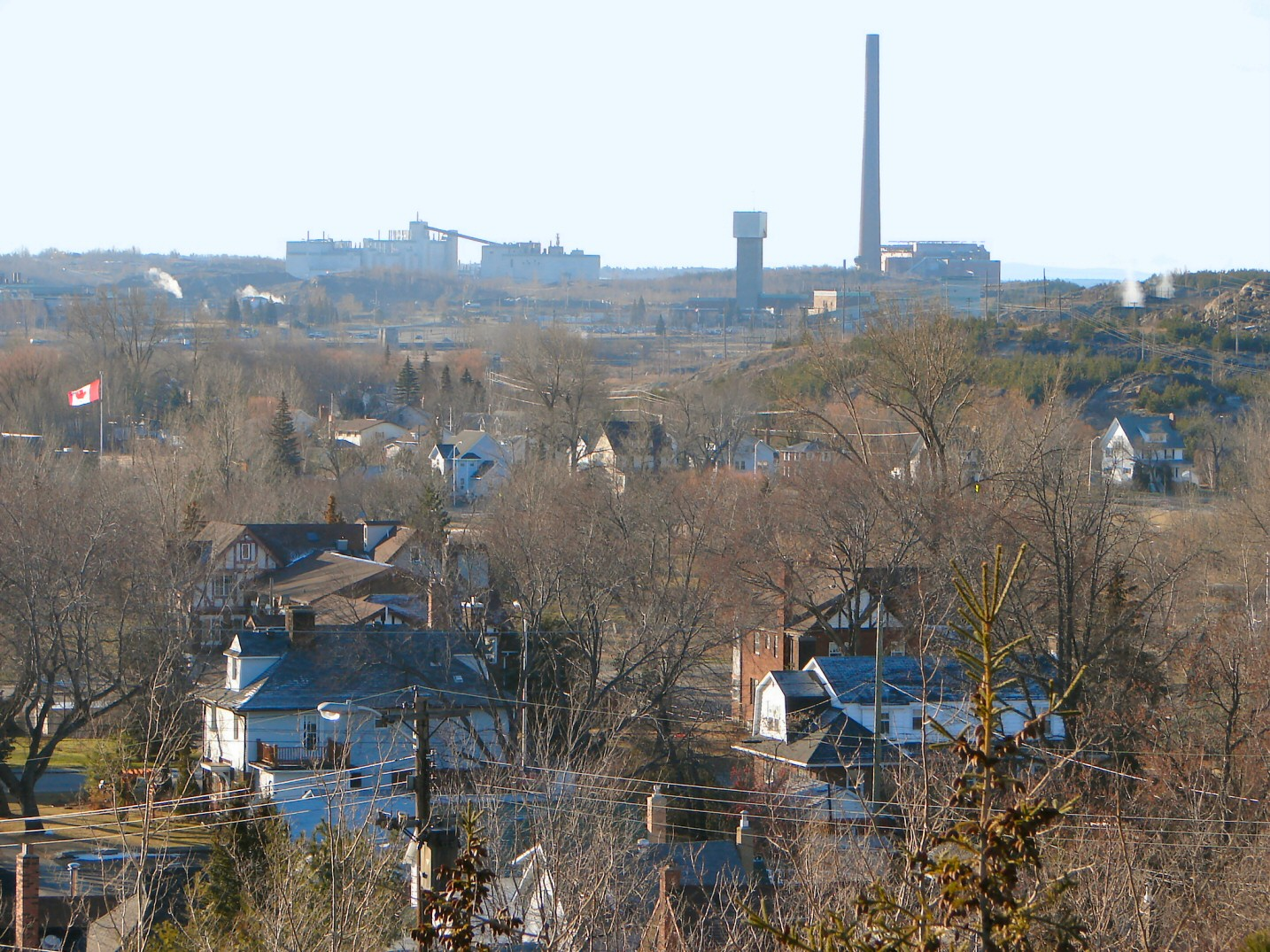
- Interactive map of Copper Cliff
- Country: Canada
- Province: Ontario
- City: Greater Sudbury
- Ward: 2
- Founded: 1883
- Incorporated: 1901
- Annexed: 1973

Government
  - City Councillor: Eric Benoit
  - Governing Body: Greater Sudbury City Council
  - MPs: Viviane Lapointe (Liberal)
  - MPPs: Jamie West (NDP)
- Time zone: UTC−5 (EST)
  - Summer (DST): UTC−4 (EDT)
- Postal Code FSA: P0M 0C1, P0M 1N0
- Area code: 705

Copper Cliff is a community and former company town in Greater Sudbury, Ontario, Canada. Incorporated in 1901, Copper Cliff was a separate municipality until it was annexed by the City of Sudbury in 1973 as part of the creation of the Regional Municipality of Sudbury.

== History ==
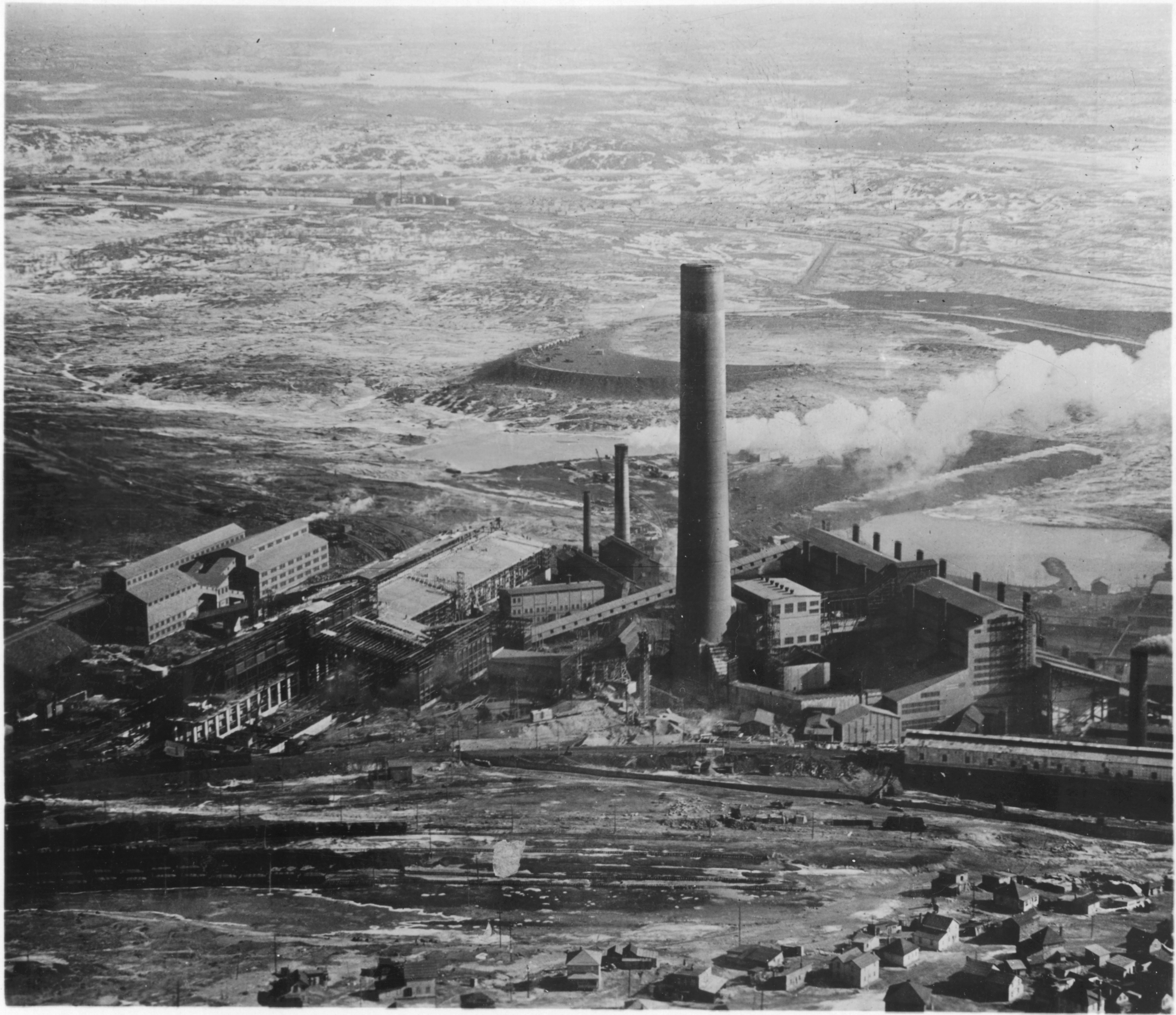
Copper Cliff Smelter, c. 1925

When the Canadian Pacific Railway was under construction in the region in 1883, blacksmith Tom Flanagan discovered chalcopyrite deposits in the area of what is now Copper Cliff. The ore was initially shipped to a smelting plant in Constable Hook, New Jersey, where it was discovered that the ore was rich in nickel. Robert M. Thompson discovered the first commercially viable method of separating Pentlandite-borne Nickel from Chalcopyrite-borne Copper in 1893, and nickel mining in the Sudbury area began throughout the 1890s. Large-scale nickel mining began in 1902 with the formation of the International Nickel Company backed by American banker J.P. Morgan and Charles Schwab.

Copper Cliff was founded as a company town by the Canadian Copper Company in the 1890s. When Copper Cliff was incorporated in 1901, it had a larger population than the Town of Sudbury. In 1916, the company was accused of selling metals from Canada to Germany during World War One. This led to the company forming a Canadian subsidiary, the International Nickel Company of Canada, later known as Inco, which was incorporated in Copper Cliff in 1916.

As a company town, Copper Cliff's early residential development coincided with strict segregation by class and nationality. The company's engineers and administrative employees, which were primarily English Canadians, Americans, and Britons lived in planned housing created by the company and with distance away from the mine. Conversely, many immigrant workers such as Poles, Finns, Italians, and French Canadians worked in a less developed area of the city just south of the mine often referred to as "Shantytown" because of the quantity of shacks and shanties present.

The City of Sudbury attempted to annex Copper Cliff a number of times in order to gain municipal taxation rights to the mining facilities in the community, but these attempts were rejected by the Ontario Municipal Board due to incompatibilities with federal and provincial mining taxation rules. As part of municipal restructuring in 1973, the town was annexed by the city as part of the creation of the Regional Municipality of Sudbury. At the time of the annexation, about 4,000 people lived in Copper Cliff. A ceremony was held by residents on 31 December 1972 to mourn the loss of the town. Some residents opposed the merger, and had formed a committee to oppose it.

The operations of the sintering plant in Copper Cliff that ran from 1948 to 1963 produced large amounts of nickel sulphide and sulphur dioxide that served as a significant health risk at the time to the workers at the plant and the local community. Workers that were exposed to the dust without proper protective equipment were victim to various forms of respiratory cancers, which led to an abnormally high mortality rate within the province. It wasn't until June 10, 1956, when a Jean Gagnon and a few coworkers performed a wildcat strike to try and bring attention to the health issues occurring at the plant and effectively blocked entry to the Inco smelter at the sintering plant for a day. Following this event, many began to make connections to the plant when their coworkers would get sick and soon after 90% of men always wore their masks within the plant. This event was the start of decades of fighting with the company for workers' compensation from illness as well as a general recognition of the diseases caused as a byproduct of industrial operations.

The Inco Superstack was completed by Inco in 1972, and was the tallest chimney in the world until the construction of the Ekibastuz GRES-2 Power Station in the Kazakh SSR in 1987. The Superstack was decommissioned in 2020. The superstack was constructed because of pressure from the local community and provincial government with the goal of dispersing the toxic emissions into the atmosphere to improve the air quality of Copper Cliff. Outside the community, the superstack is seen as a symbol of pollution, however the superstack holds deep meaning for the community of Copper Cliff. It represents a symbol of the workers' importance and identity to the community. For many in the community it has evoked "smokestack nostalgia" because of the economic stability that came with the industrial work of the past.

== Little Italy ==
Copper Cliff is home to an Italian Canadian community that traditionally inhabited the Little Italy neighbourhood located near the base of the Superstack centred on Diorite Street and Craig Street. A number of Italian-Canadians in Copper Cliff trace their heritage to the Italian town of Metaurilia in the Pesaro e Urbino commune of Fano.

Little Italy arose from the creation of a smelter by Inco leading to an influx of Italian immigrants in the area. Little Italy quickly became a ghetto for the Italian community reinforced by an Italian church, and Italian stores and services, which kept the community close and uneager to visit sections of Copper Cliff that did not have an Italian presence. In response to events occurring during World War Two, the Italian community faced significant social challenges in part because of the creation of the War Measures Act, which gave police freedom to arrest someone that is suspected as a threat to Canada. When Italy entered the war on June 10, 1940, several hundred Italian Canadians living in Sudbury were considered "enemy aliens" and put into work camps. Following the events of the war, the Italians in Sudbury were freed and allowed to continue daily life, however, the Italian community did not fully recover from the social disruption caused by the war until the 1950s and 60s when there was a new wave of Italian immigrants that restored the community's social life.

== See also ==
- List of company towns in Canada
