= National Academic Library of the Republic of Kazakhstan =

Coordinates: 51.1271°N 71.4272°E

The National Academic Library of Kazakhstan is a national library specializing in academic publications. Built during the presidency of National Library of Kazakhstan, the structure resembles a Möbius strip.

== See also ==
- National Library of Kazakhstan
- List of libraries in Kazakhstan
