= List of libraries in Kazakhstan =

This is a list of libraries in Kazakhstan.

== Libraries by locale ==
=== Akmola ===
- Akmola Regional Scientific Universal Library

=== Aktobe ===
- Aktobe Regional Universal Scientific Library

=== Almaty ===
- Al-Farabi Kazakh National University Library, Almaty
- Almaty Libraries
- Children's Library Named after S. Begalin
- National Library of Kazakhstan, Almaty
- Nazarbayev University Library

=== Astana ===
- Central Scientific Library of the Kazakh Ministry of Education and Science, Astana
- National Academic Library of the Republic of Kazakhstan, Astana

=== Atyrau ===
- Atyrau Regional Universal Scientific Library named after G. Slanov

=== East Kazakhstan ===
- East Kazakhstan Regional Library named after A.S. Pushkin, Oskemen
- Scientific Library of the East Kazakhstan State University named after S. Amanzholov
- Scientific Library of the East Kazakhstan State Technical University named after D. Serikbayeva

=== Jambyl ===
- Taraz Public Library

=== Karaganda ===
- Karaganda Regional Universal Scientific Library named after Gogol

=== Kostanay ===
- Kostanay Regional Universal Scientific Library Lev Nikolayevich Tolstoy

=== Kyzylorda ===
- Kyzylorda Regional Universal Scientific Library named after A. Tazhibayev

=== Mangystau ===
- Mangystau Regional Universal Library

=== North Kazakhstan ===
- North Kazakhstan Regional Universal Scientific Library Named after S. Mukanov, Petropavl

=== Pavlodar ===
- S. Toraighyrov Pavlodar Regional Universal Scientific Library, Pavlodar

=== West Kazakhstan ===
- West Kazakhstan Regional Scientific Library

== See also ==
- Copyright law of Kazakhstan
- Kazakh literature
- Library associations in Kazakhstan
- Mass media in Kazakhstan

in other languages

- Archives of Kazakhstan (in Russian)
- Libraries of Kazakhstan (in Kazakh)
- Libraries of the South Kazakhstan region (in Kazakh)
- Library Association of the Republic of Kazakhstan (in Russian)
