= Pavlodar =

Capital city of Pavlodar Region, Kazakhstan

Pavlodar Павлодар
- City
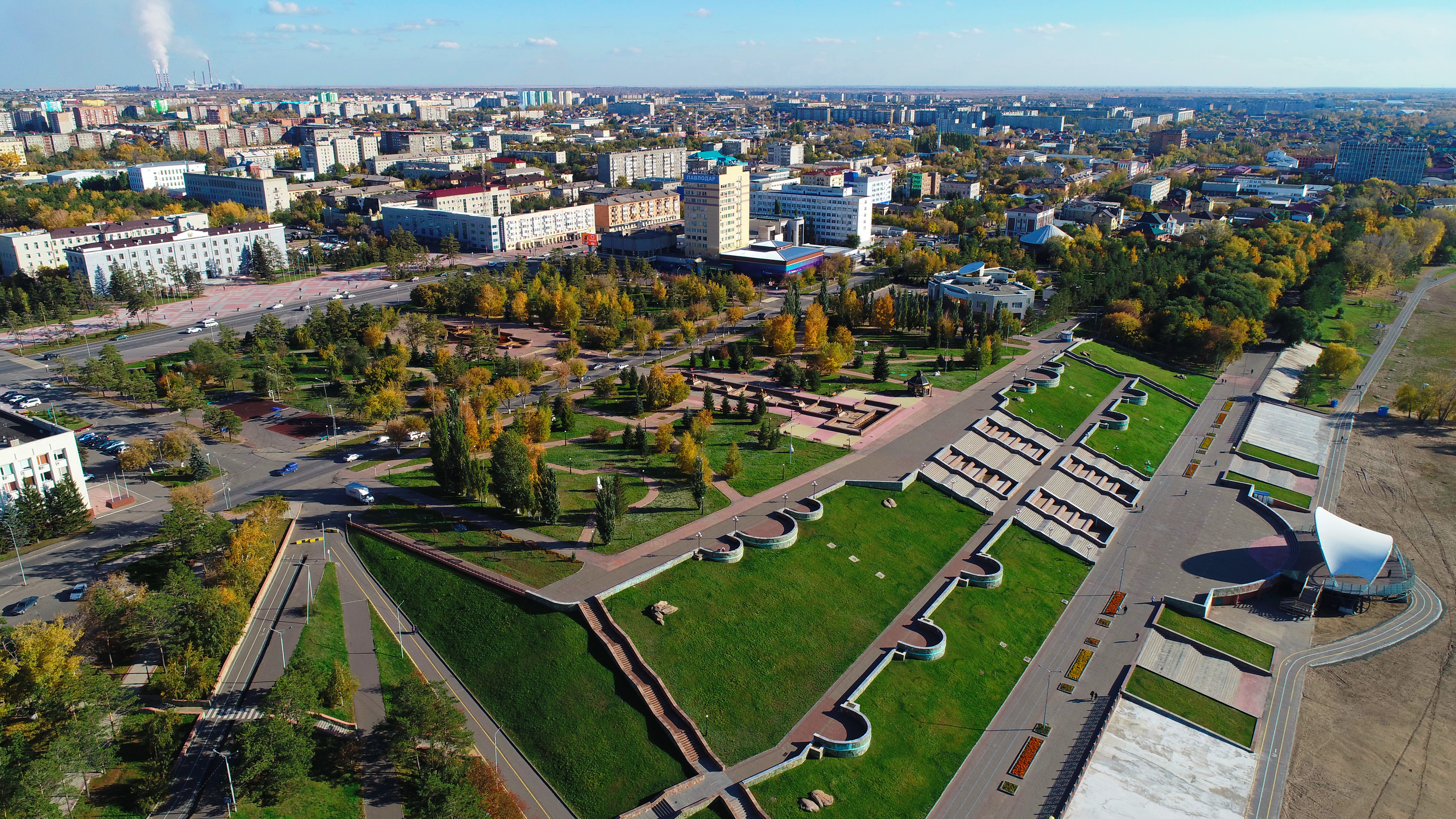
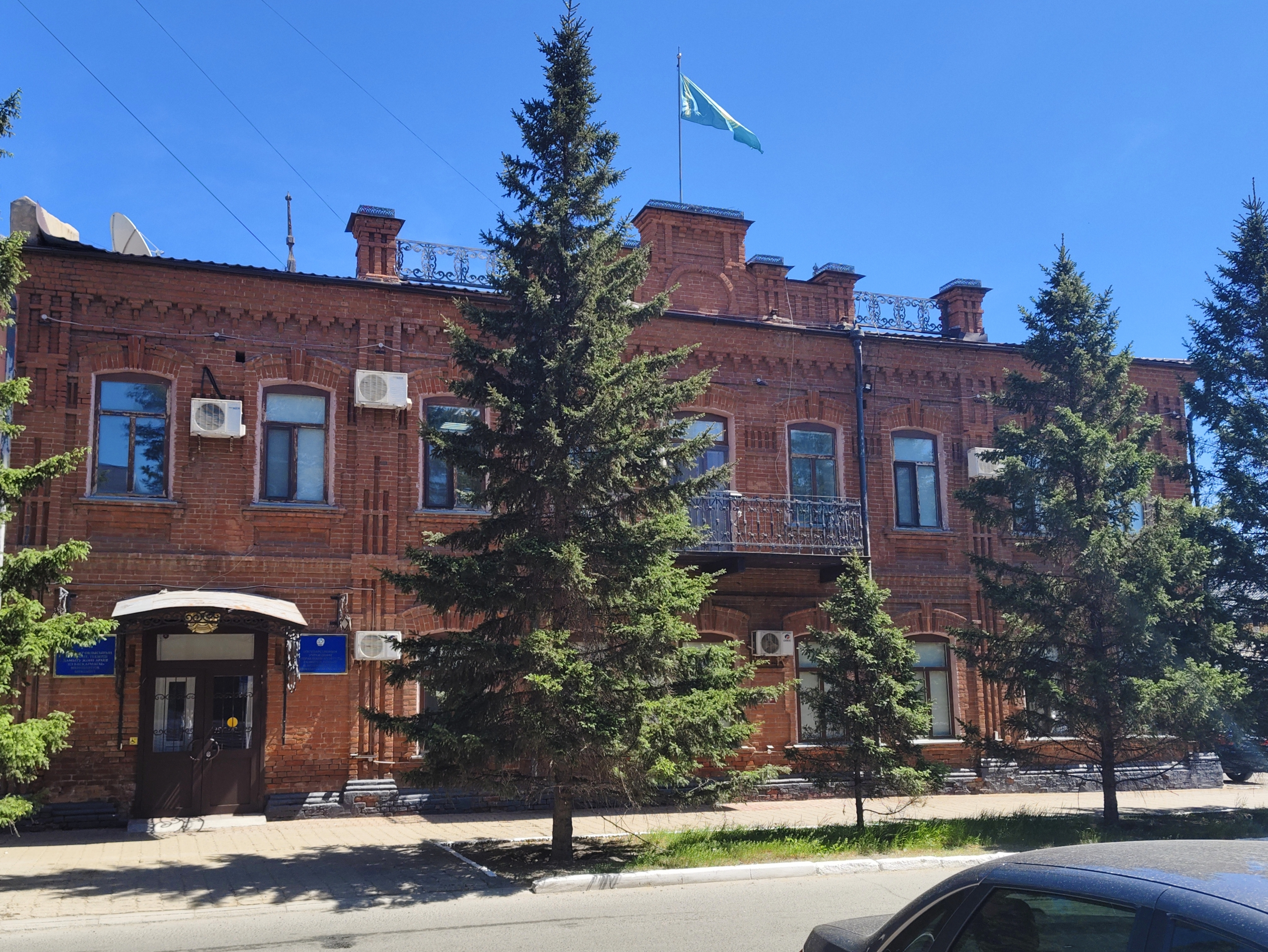
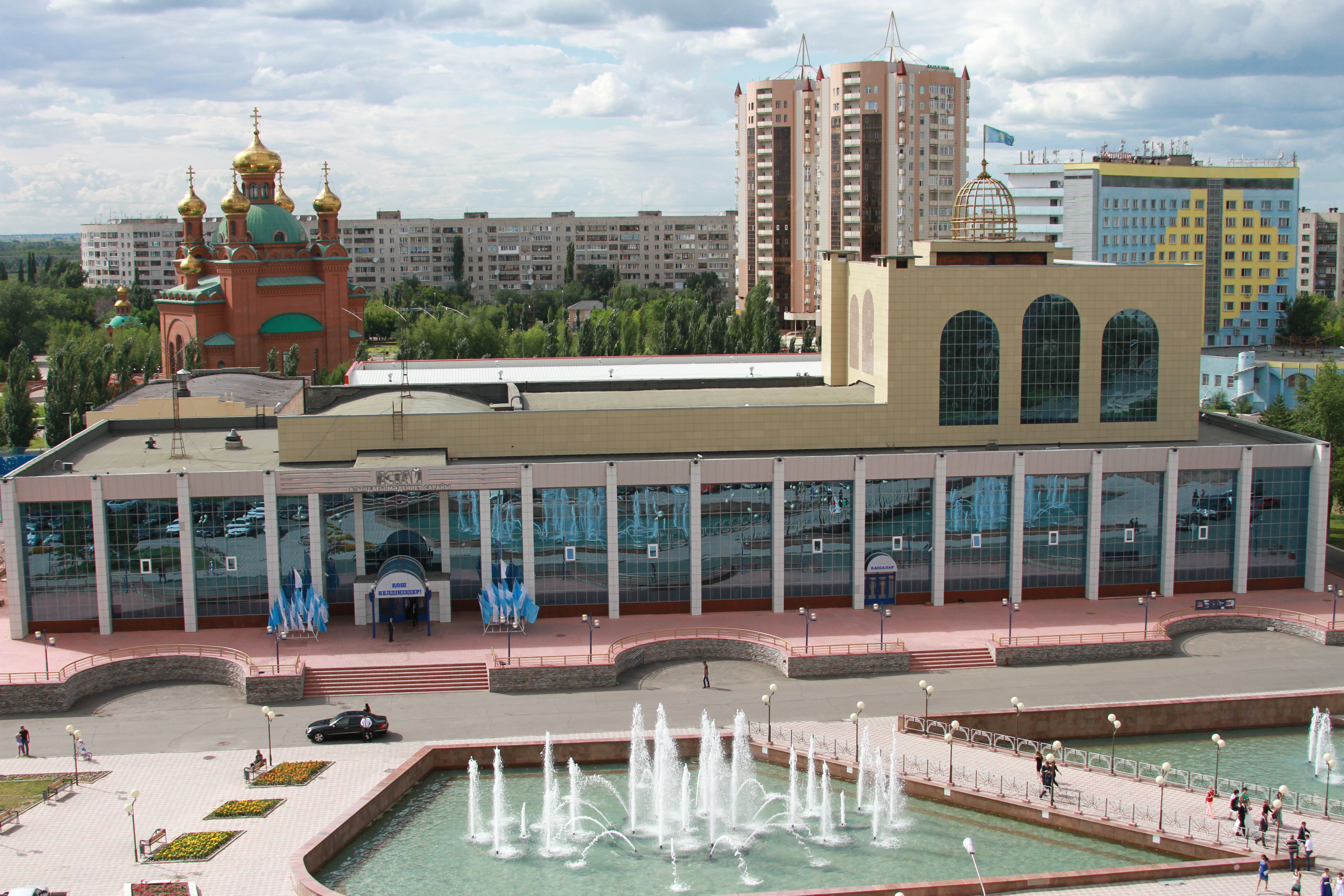
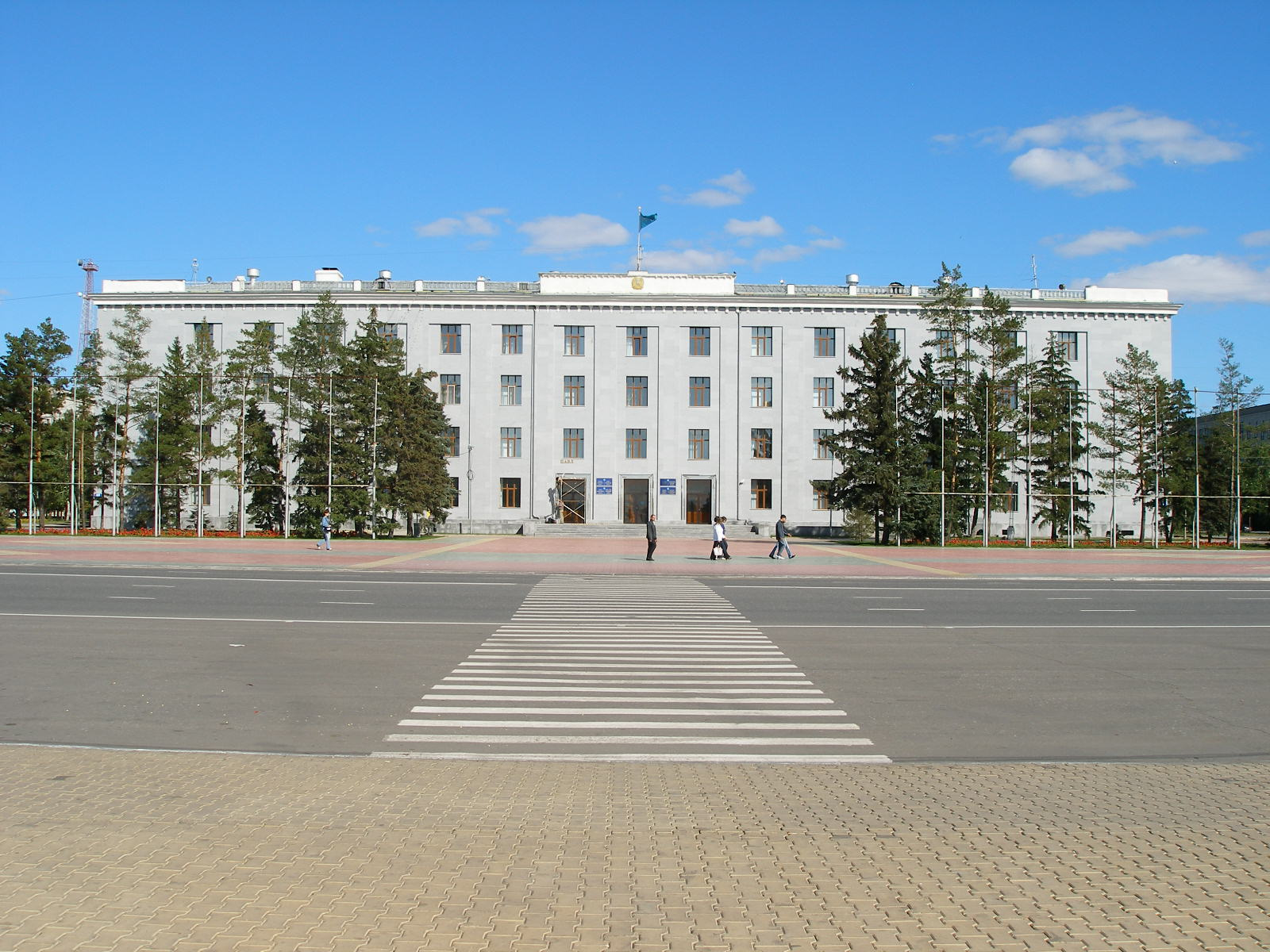
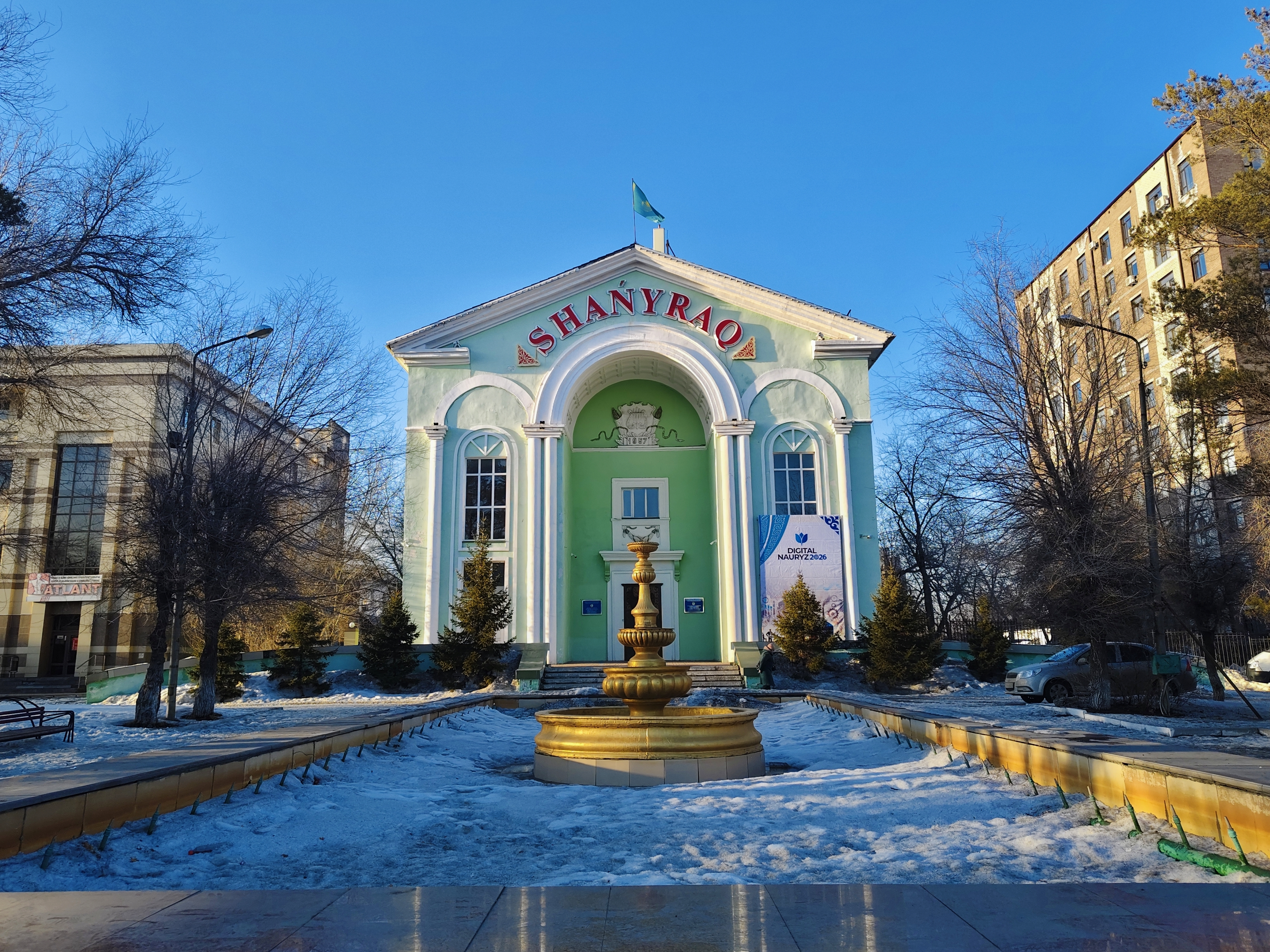
- Aerial view Department of Culture Estay Cultural Centre Regional administration Shanyraq Concert Hall

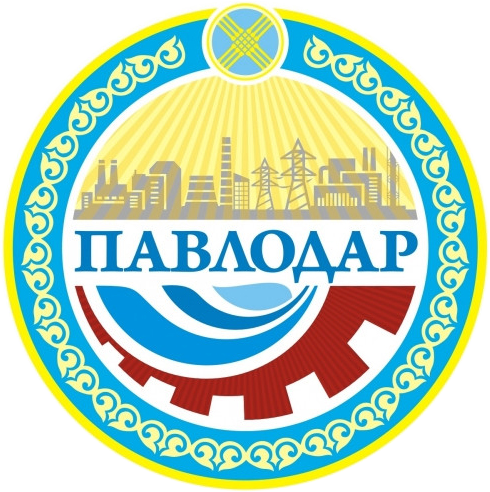
- Flag Coat of arms

- Location in Kazakhstan
- Coordinates: 52°18′N 76°57′E
- Country: Kazakhstan
- Region: Pavlodar Region
- Established: Early 9th century
- Incorporated: 1861

Government
  - Akim (mayor): Khassar Khabylbekov

Area
  - City: 631.3 km^{2} (243.7 sq mi)
  - Urban: 100 km^{2} (39 sq mi)
- Elevation: 123 m (404 ft)

Population (2023 estimate)
  - City: 367,254
  - Density: 581.7/km^{2} (1,507/sq mi)
  - Urban: 343,091
  - Urban density: 3,400/km^{2} (8,900/sq mi)
- (2022 estimate)
- Time zone: UTC+5 (UTC+5)
- Postal code: 140000–140017
- Area code: +7 7182
- Climate: Dfb
- Website: www.pavlodar.gov.kz

Pavlodar (/ˌpɑːvləˈdɑːr/; Kazakh: Павлодар [pɑvɫəˈdɑr]; Russian: Павлодар [pəvɫɐˈdar]) is a city in northeastern Kazakhstan and the capital of Pavlodar Region. It is located 450 kilometres (280 mi) northeast of the national capital Astana and 405 kilometres (252 mi) southeast of the Russian city of Omsk along the Irtysh River. In 2010, the city had a population of 331,710. The city is served by Pavlodar Airport.

== History ==
One of the oldest cities in northern Kazakhstan, Pavlodar was founded in the 9th century as the settlements of Khakan-Kimak and Imakia, the capitals of the Kimek–Kipchak confederation.

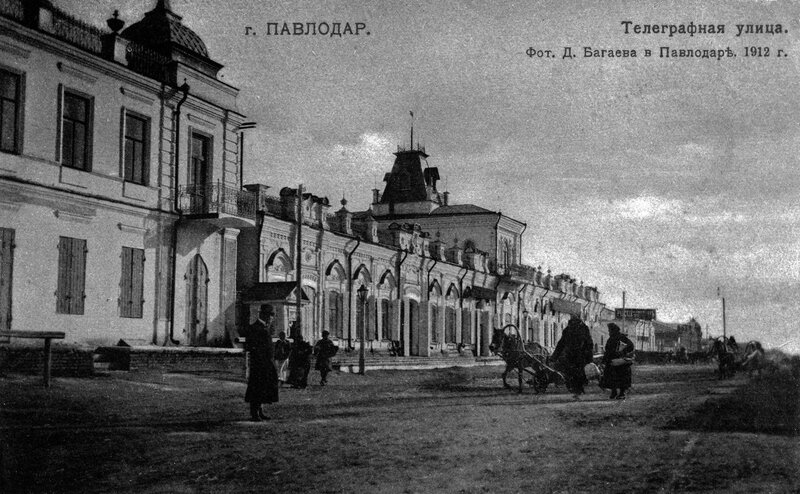
Pavlodar in 1912

Koryakovsky fort was founded in 1720 as an Imperial Russian outpost. The settlement was created to establish control over the region's salt lakes, an important source of valuable salt. In 1861 the settlement was renamed Pavlodar and incorporated as a town. Pavlodar's significance was due in large measure to the substantial agricultural and salt-producing industries that had developed there despite the town's relatively small population. Pavlodar's population numbered only about 8,000 in 1897. The name Pavlodar means The Gift of Paul, and was chosen to commemorate the birth of the Grand Duke Paul Alexandrovich of Russia.

During World War II, in connection with the formation of the Polish Anders' Army, a Polish diplomatic post was established in the city in February 1942, however it was closed in July 1942 when the Soviets arrested nine of its staff members (all of whom were released in October 1942).

After 1955, the Soviet Government's Virgin Lands Campaign provided the impetus for the rapid growth and development of modern Pavlodar. Under the program, large numbers of young men and women from throughout the Soviet Union were relocated to the city; industrial and commercial activity was increased; and from the mid-1960s on, Pavlodar grew to become a major industrial centre of both the Kazakh SSR and of the Soviet Union because of a major arms and armour manufacturing facility located in the city.

== Geography ==
=== Climate ===
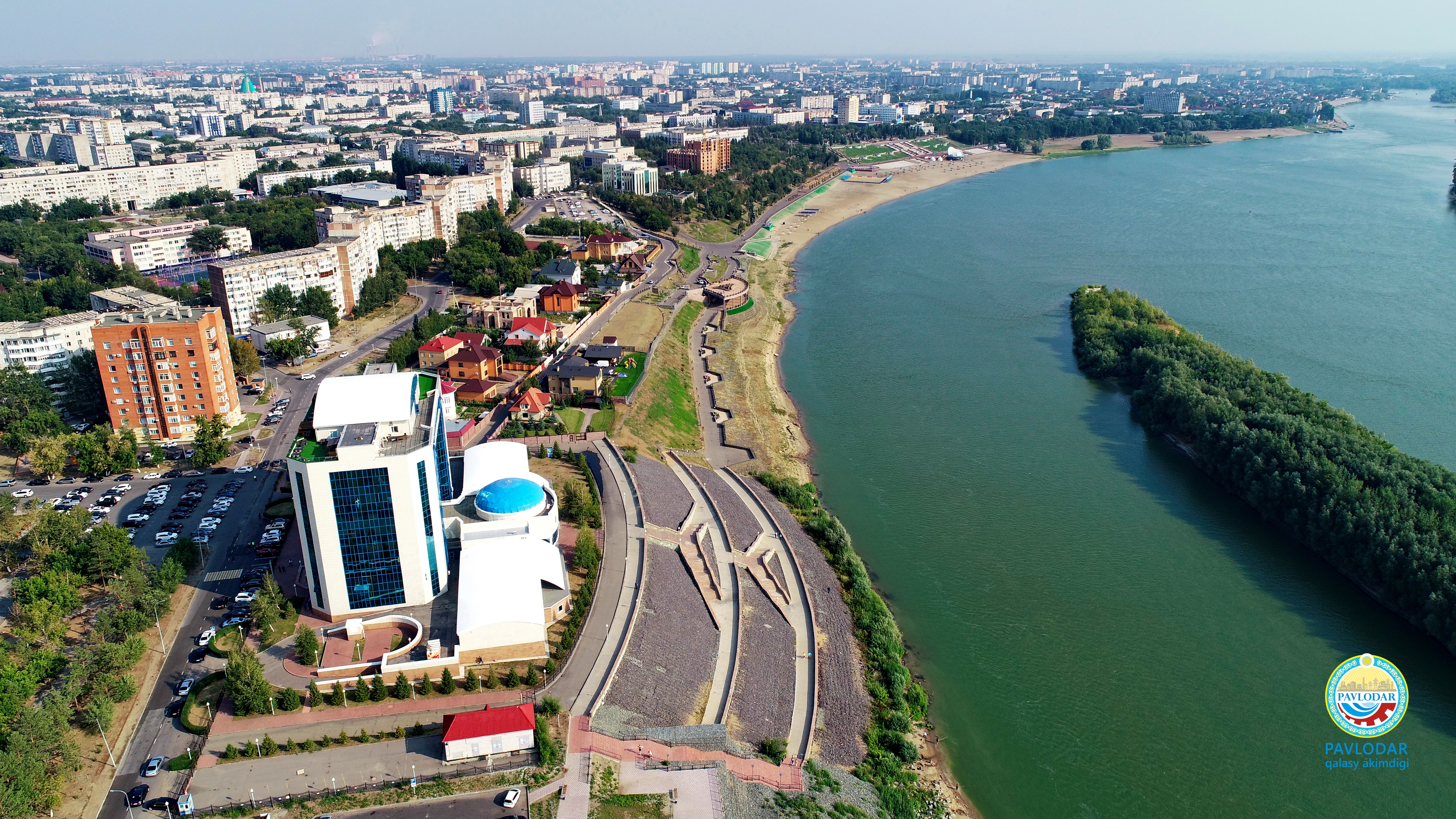
Irtysh River in Pavlodar

Pavlodar has a warm-summer humid continental climate that borders on the hot summer one (Köppen Dfb but only ½ a degree below Dfa) with long, cold winters and hot summers.

The average temperature in January is −15.8 °C (4 °F) with absolute observed lows reaching −45 to −47 °C (−49 to −53 °F). In July the temperature averages 21.5 °C (71 °F). Yearly precipitation amounts to 303 mm (12 in).

Climate data for Pavlodar (1991–2020, extremes 1948–present)
Month	Jan	Feb	Mar	Apr	May	Jun	Jul	Aug	Sep	Oct	Nov	Dec	Year
Record high °C (°F)	4.2 (39.6)	5.3 (41.5)	24.6 (76.3)	33.9 (93.0)	38.0 (100.4)	40.8 (105.4)	42.0 (107.6)	40.6 (105.1)	36.1 (97.0)	29.2 (84.6)	17.9 (64.2)	7.2 (45.0)	42.0 (107.6)
Mean daily maximum °C (°F)	−11.8 (10.8)	−9.1 (15.6)	−0.6 (30.9)	13.7 (56.7)	21.3 (70.3)	26.5 (79.7)	27.7 (81.9)	26.1 (79.0)	19.1 (66.4)	10.7 (51.3)	−1.4 (29.5)	−8.5 (16.7)	9.5 (49.1)
Daily mean °C (°F)	−16.7 (1.9)	−14.7 (5.5)	−6.2 (20.8)	6.8 (44.2)	14.2 (57.6)	19.8 (67.6)	21.2 (70.2)	19.0 (66.2)	12.1 (53.8)	4.5 (40.1)	−5.9 (21.4)	−13.1 (8.4)	3.4 (38.1)
Mean daily minimum °C (°F)	−21.6 (−6.9)	−20.1 (−4.2)	−11.5 (11.3)	0.1 (32.2)	6.6 (43.9)	12.8 (55.0)	14.9 (58.8)	12.2 (54.0)	5.6 (42.1)	−0.8 (30.6)	−10.1 (13.8)	−18.1 (−0.6)	−2.5 (27.5)
Record low °C (°F)	−45 (−49)	−42.8 (−45.0)	−37.2 (−35.0)	−27.2 (−17.0)	−7.2 (19.0)	−2.2 (28.0)	4.2 (39.6)	0.2 (32.4)	−9 (16)	−21.5 (−6.7)	−40 (−40)	−45.2 (−49.4)	−45.2 (−49.4)
Average precipitation mm (inches)	18.3 (0.72)	15.1 (0.59)	15.5 (0.61)	15.4 (0.61)	26.0 (1.02)	41.6 (1.64)	56.8 (2.24)	31.6 (1.24)	20.8 (0.82)	24.1 (0.95)	22.6 (0.89)	22.4 (0.88)	310.2 (12.21)
Average extreme snow depth cm (inches)	17 (6.7)	24 (9.4)	17 (6.7)	0 (0)	0 (0)	0 (0)	0 (0)	0 (0)	0 (0)	0 (0)	3 (1.2)	12 (4.7)	24 (9.4)
Average rainy days	1	0	3	8	12	12	15	12	12	10	5	1	91
Average snowy days	18	16	12	5	1	0.03	0	0.03	0	5	14	19	90
Average relative humidity (%)	79	79	80	62	54	55	60	61	63	71	80	80	69
Source: Pogoda.ru.net

== Demographics ==
The city's population is 331,119 (as of January 1, 2018), and the extended urbanized area has 342,321 inhabitants.

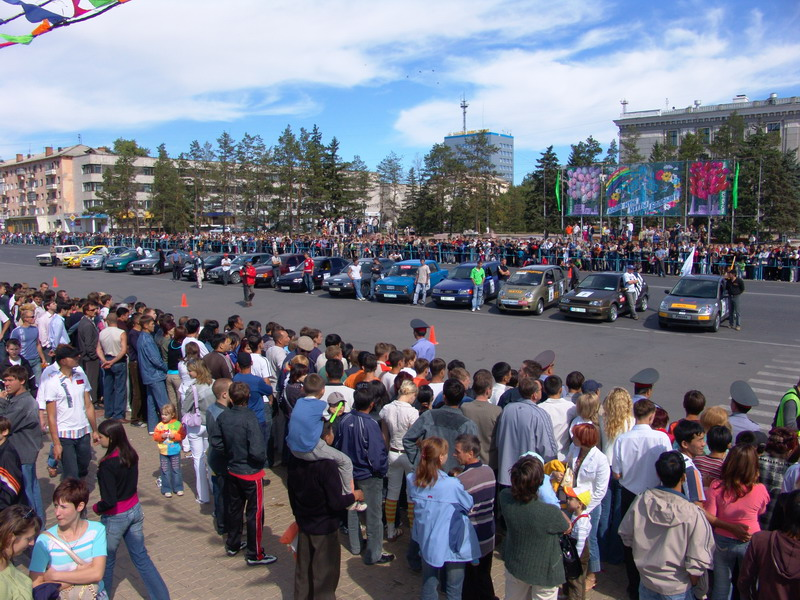
Amateur racing in downtown Pavlodar on "City Day" 2006

Ethnic groups are as follows (as of January 1, 2018):

- Kazakhs — 166,835 (46.54%)
- Russians — 152,032 (41.63%)
- Ukrainians — 15,184 (4.69%)
- Germans — 9,058 (2.73%)
- Tatars — 7,752 (2.34%)
- Belarusians — 2,852 (0.86%)
- Ingushetians — 1,279 (0.39%)
- Moldovans — 954 (0.29%)
- Azeris — 802 (0.24%)
- Chechens — 800 (0.24%)
- Koreans — 594 (0.18%)
- Polish — 574 (0.17%)
- Bulgarians — 475 (0.15%)
- Chuvash — 425 (0.14%)
- Bashkirs — 415 (0.13%)
- Others — 5,470 (1.65%)
- Total — 331,710 (100.00%)

== Economy ==
The largest local industries are aluminum, industrial chemicals, and farm machinery. An oil refinery was completed in 1978. In 2012 Polish rolling stock manufacturer Pesa Bydgoszcz announced its intentions to build a tram assembly plant in Pavlodar in conjunction with the city's plans to buy up to 100 new trams from the manufacturer to shore up its aging public transport infrastructure. The pharmaceutical company Romat is based in Pavlodar.

== Sports ==
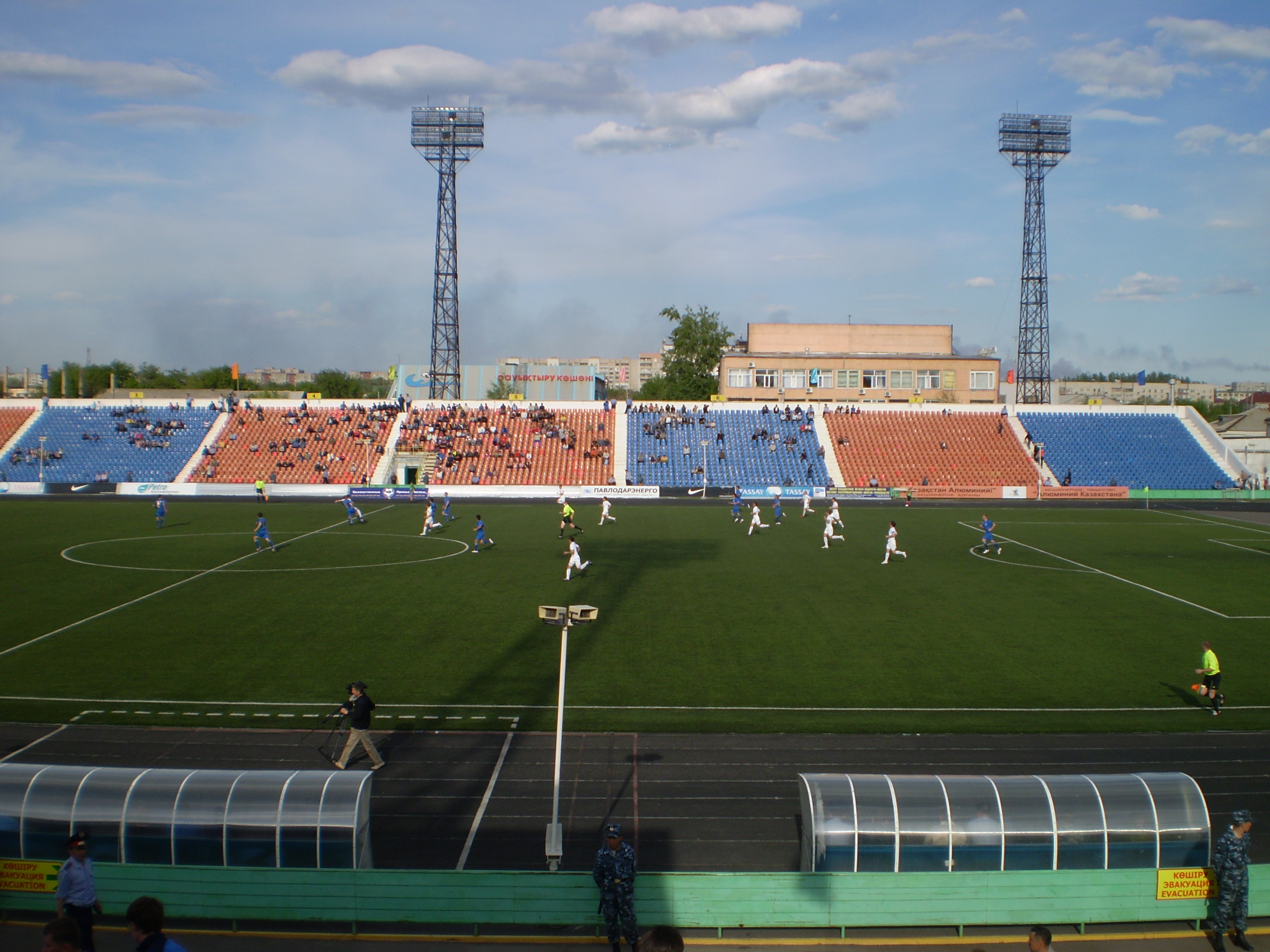
Pavlodar Central Stadium

FC Irtysh was a Kazakh football club based at the Central Stadium in Pavlodar. Another notable club formerly based in Pavlodar, FC Energetik, has since relocated to Ekibastuz.

The Chess Federation of Pavlodar organizes frequent citywide competitions such as «Pavlodar Open 2007» and «The Pavlodar Regional Cup», a fast chess competition. Several FIDE masters, and grandmasters including Rinat Zhumabayev, Pavel Kotsur, Yuri Nikitin Vladimir Grebenshikov, and Yelena Ankudinova, participate regularly in the events.

Ice hockey team Irtysh play in Nur-Sultan Ice Palace (capacity 2,800). Pavlodar hockey players were the champions of Kazakhstan three times in the row in the seasons 2012/2013, 2013/2014 and 2014/2015.

== Infrastructure ==
=== Public transportation ===
==== Tram ====
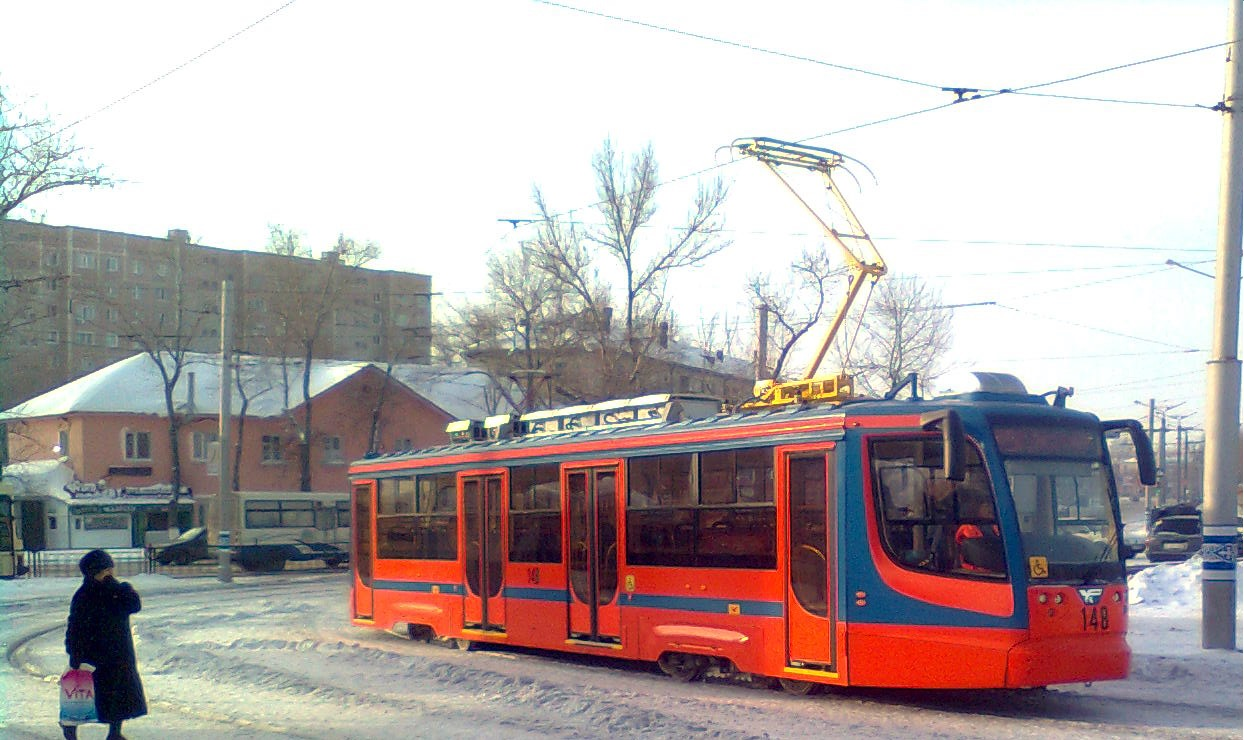
Tram on Pavlodar street

Pavlodar has an 89 km streetcar (tram) network, which began service in 1965 with, as of 2012, 20 regular and 3 special routes. The network has a 60% share of the local public transport market. However, its fleet of 115 trams is due to be replaced by 100 new trams produced locally by Polish manufacturer PESA SA.

==== River Port ====
Currently, Pavlodar River Port JSC is operating — a large transport and industrial enterprise engaged in cargo transit, extraction and sale of river sand, sells and transports crushed stone, coal, performs work on cleaning hydrological facilities.

Pavlodar River Port JSC is one of the active ports on the Irtysh River.

The project of the modern Pavlodar river port was developed in 1955 by the design institute "Giprorechtrans" on the instructions of the Ministry of the River Fleet of the USSR. Since 1965, the former wharf of Pavlodar, by the decree of the Council of Ministers of the Kazakh SSR, was renamed the Pavlodar River Port. Since that moment, a river port equipped with the latest transshipment equipment has been functioning in Pavlodar. By the mid-1980s, the Pavlodar River Port had become the largest transshipment hub. At that time, the Pavlodar River Port was in first place among forty river ports of the Soviet Union in terms of cargo transshipment volumes. During this period, on average, about 6.5 million tons of various cargoes were transported per year. Since 2001, Pavlodar River Port JSC has been a private enterprise.

==== Bus service ====
There are 21 bus routes and 13 minibus (marshrutka) routes in the city.

== Education ==
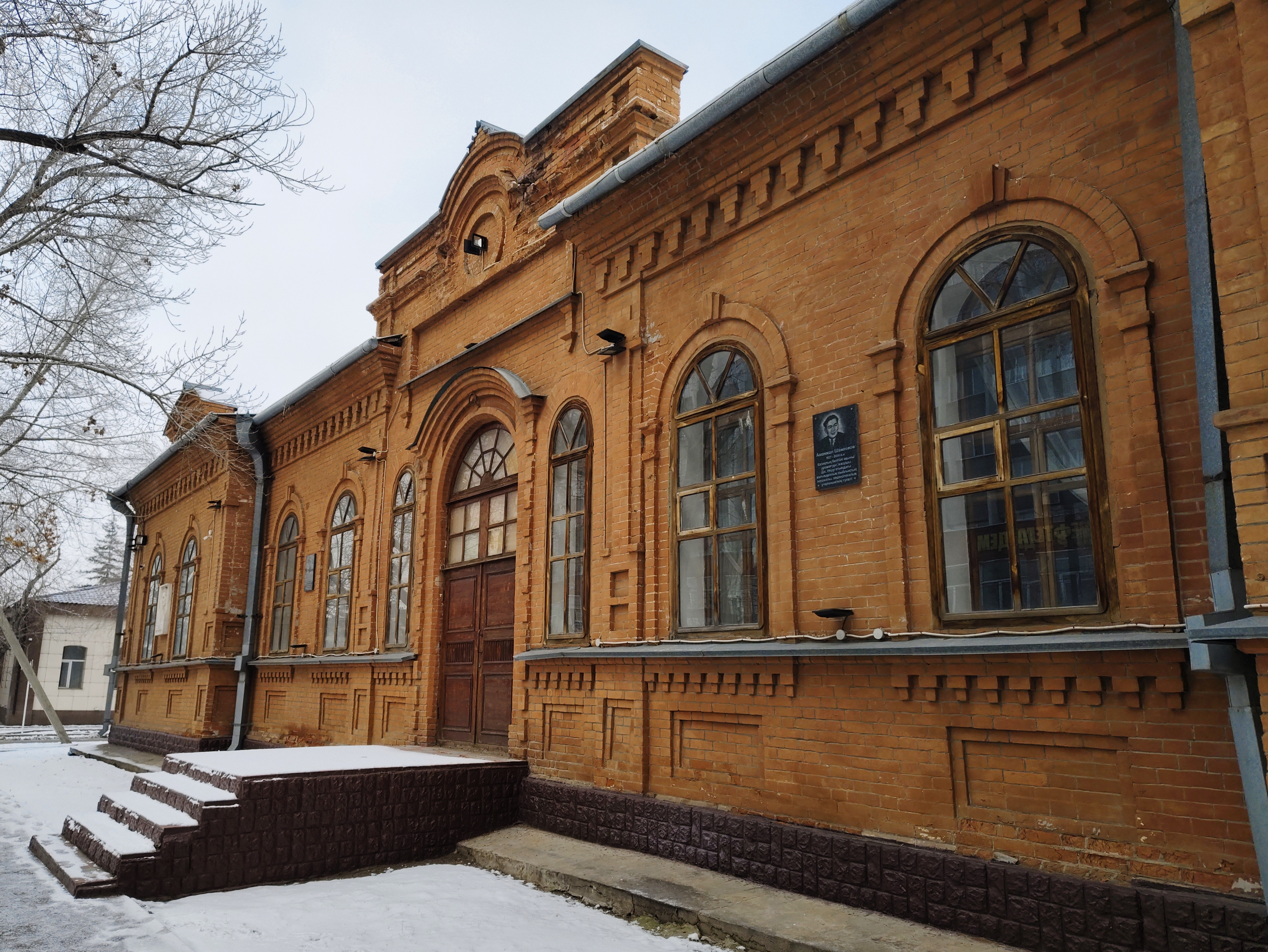
Higher Pedagogical College

Several universities are located in Pavlodar, among them:

- Pavlodar State University (named after S. Toraigyrov)
- Pavlodar State Pedagogical University
- Innovative University of Eurasia

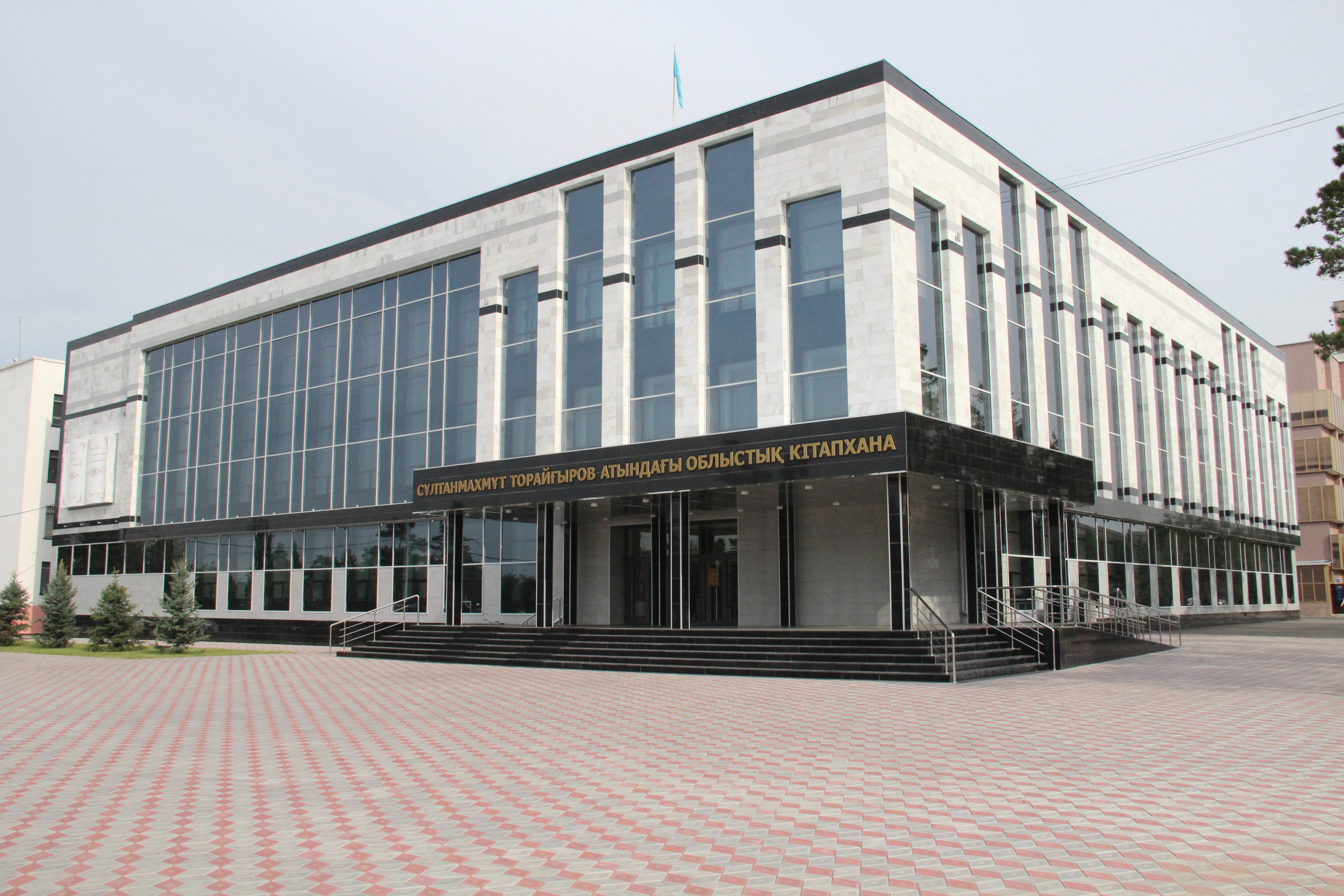
S. Toraighyrov Pavlodar Regional Universal Scientific Library

Pavlodar is also the location of S. Toraighyrov Pavlodar Regional Universal Scientific Library.

== Sister cities ==
- Bydgoszcz, Poland
- Omsk, Russia
- Denizli, Turkey
- Kropyvnytskyi, Ukraine

== Notable people ==
- Terenty Dmitrievich Deribas - a Bolshevik and member of the VChK, headed the Pavlodar revolutionary committee in 1920.
- Kanysh Imantayuli Satbayev - a Soviet geologist, studied at the Russian-Kyrgyz school in Pavlodar from 1911 until 1914.
- Maira Valievna Shamsutdinova - a native Kazakh singer and composer, was born in Pavlodar.
- Sergey Aleksandrovich Zaikov - a Kazakhstani gold medalist in the 4 × 400 metres relay, was born in Pavlodar.
- Mariya Agapova - a Kazakhstani mixed martial artist
- Vsevolod Ivanov - a Russian writer
- Maxim Kuznetsov - a Russian ice hockey player, Stanley Cup winner with Detroit Red Wings

== Gallery ==
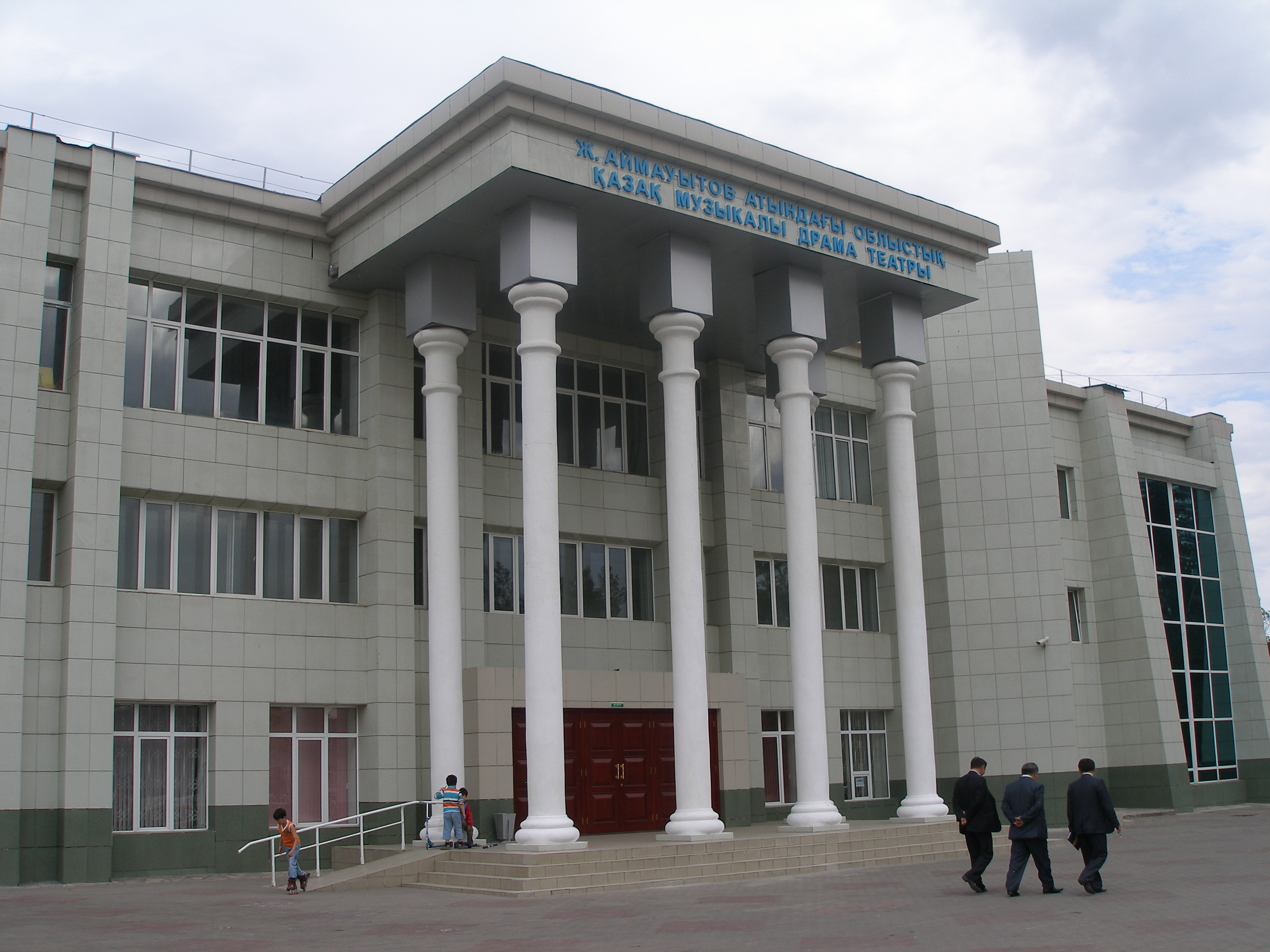
Ayimautov Theatre (Kaz. J. Aımaýytov atyndaǵy oblystyq qazaq mýzykaly drama teatry; Rus. Казахский драматический театр имени Аймаутова)

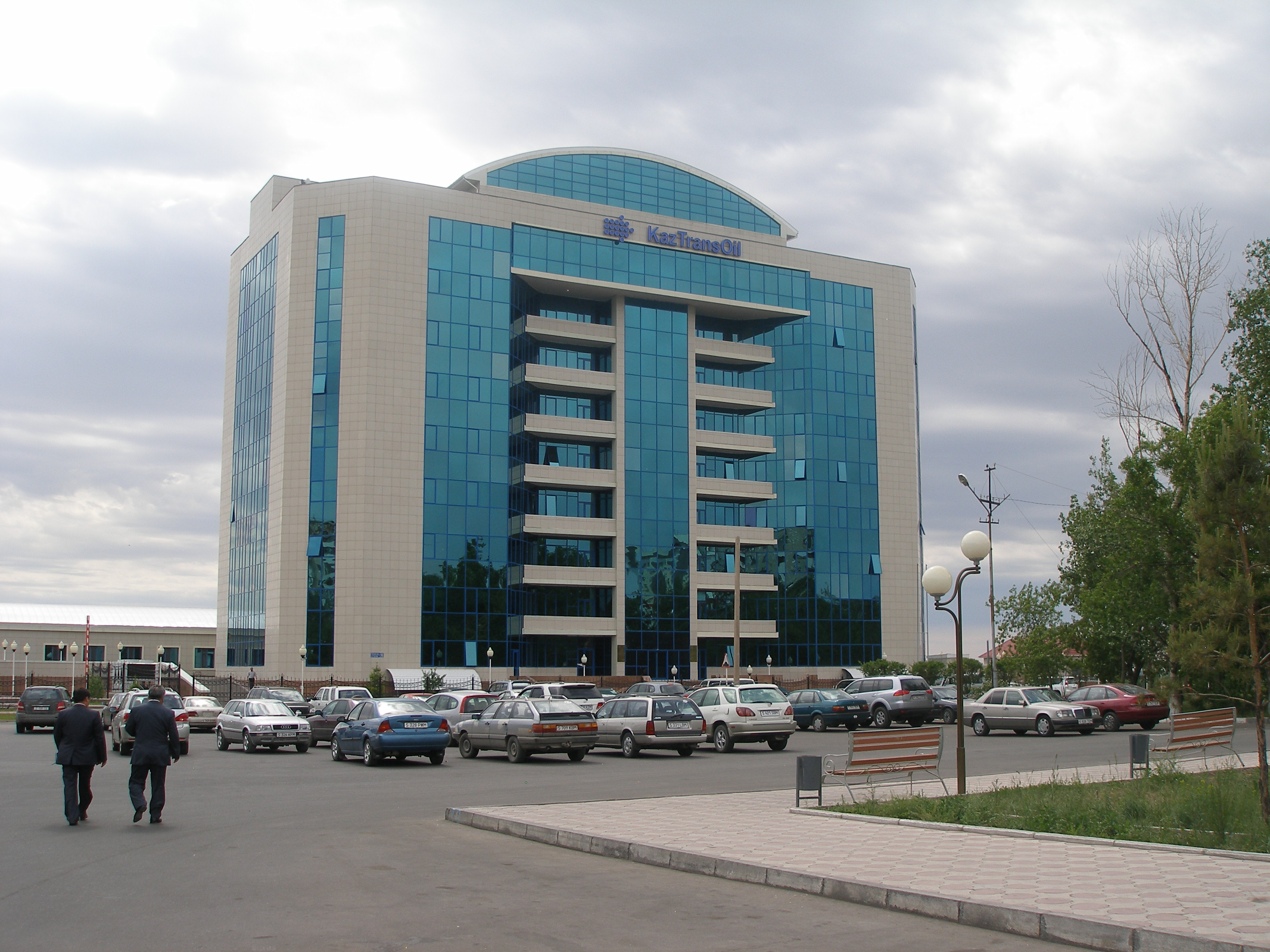
KazMunayGaz (Kaz. QazMunaıGaz-dyń ǵımaraty)

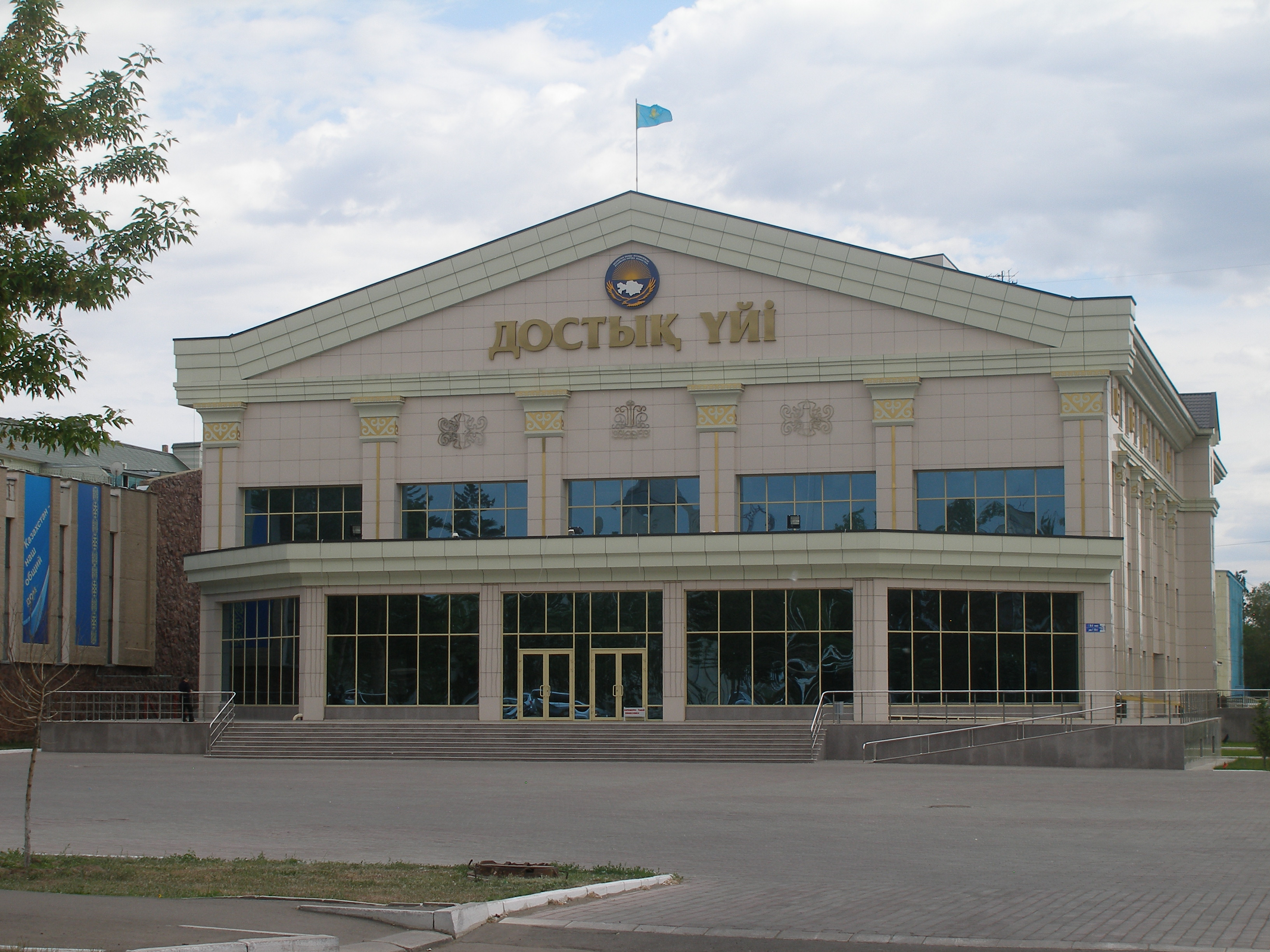
House of Friendship (Kaz. Dostyq úıi; Rus. Дом дружбы)

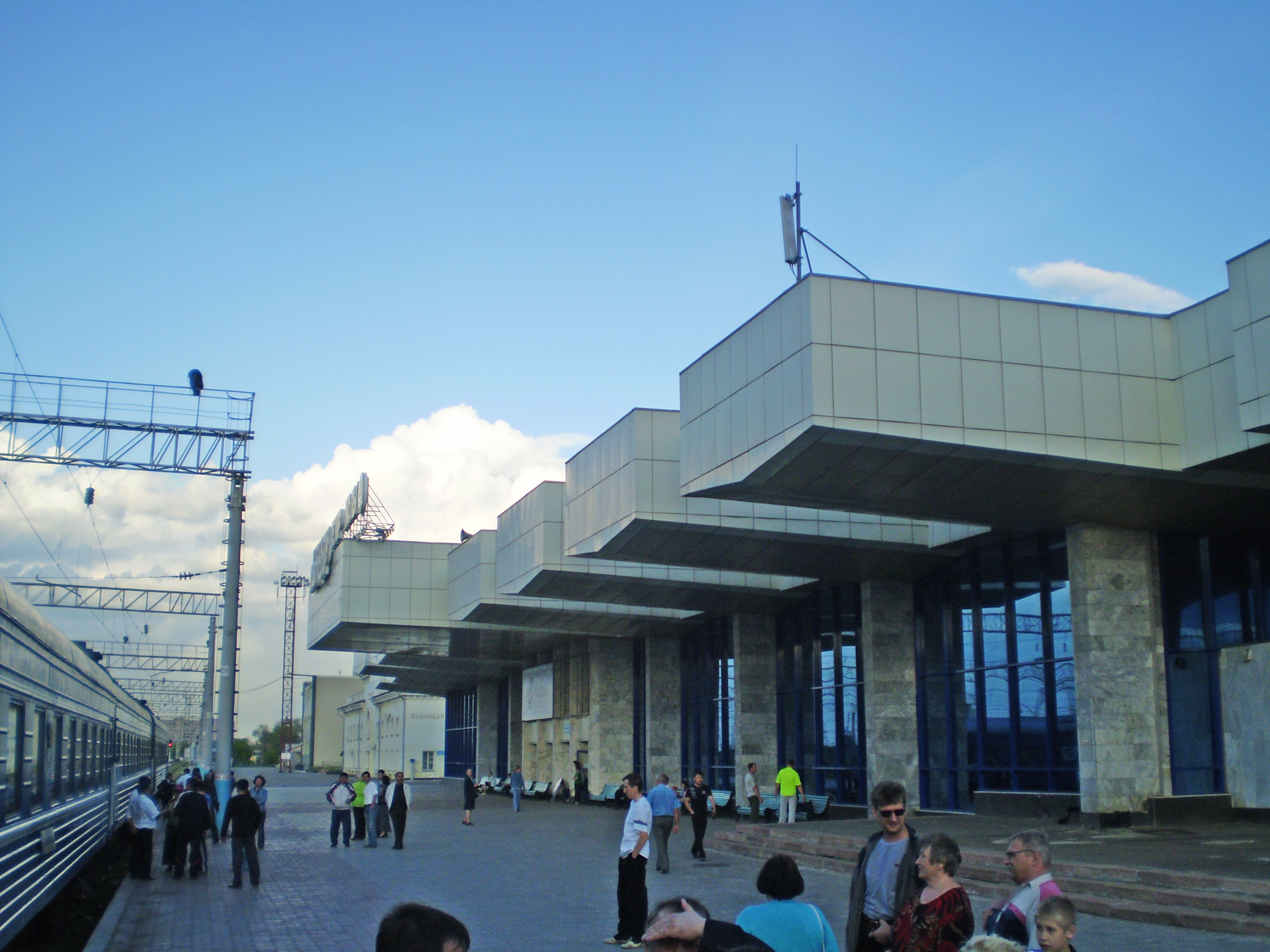
Train station

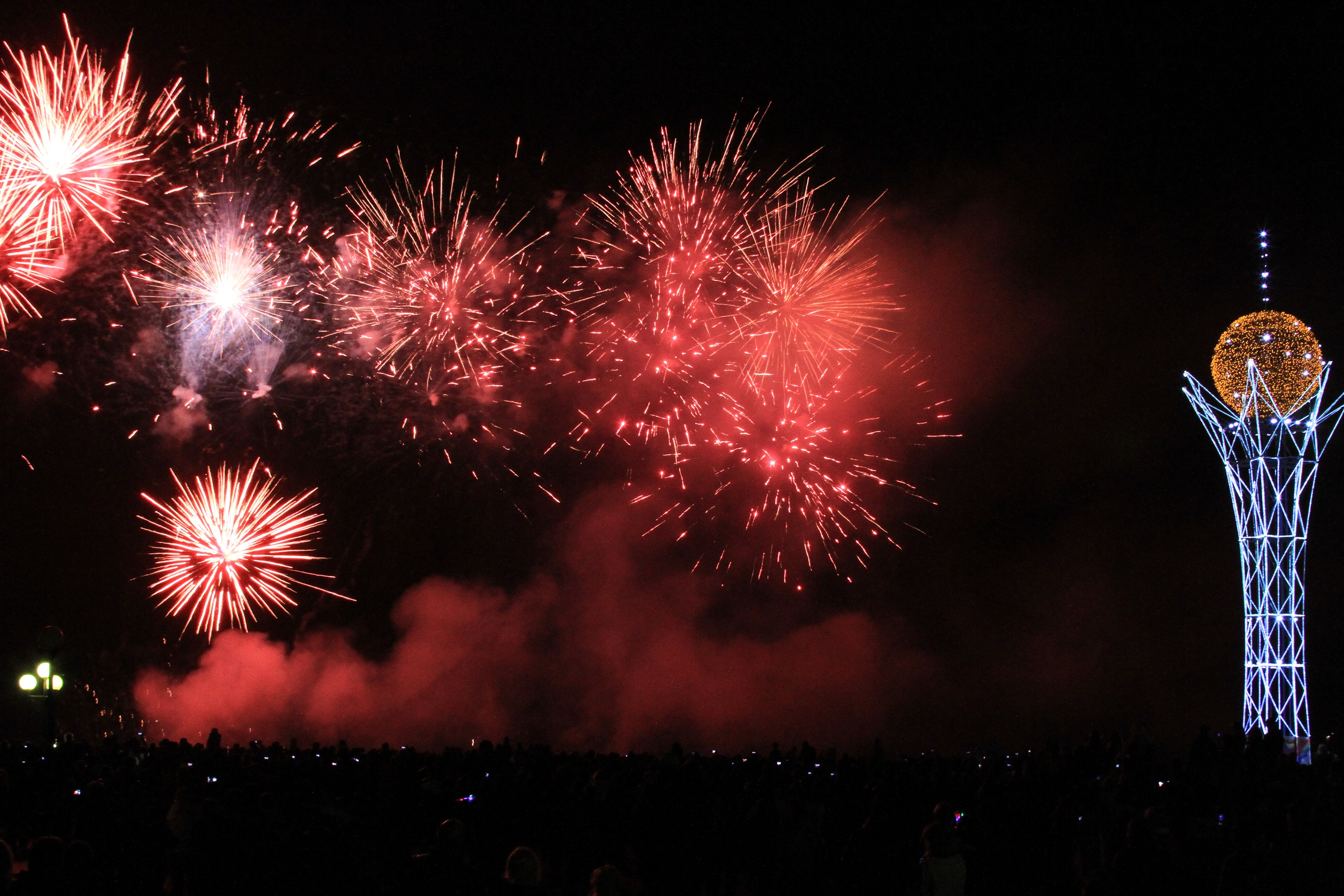
Fireworks in Pavlodar (Central Embankment)

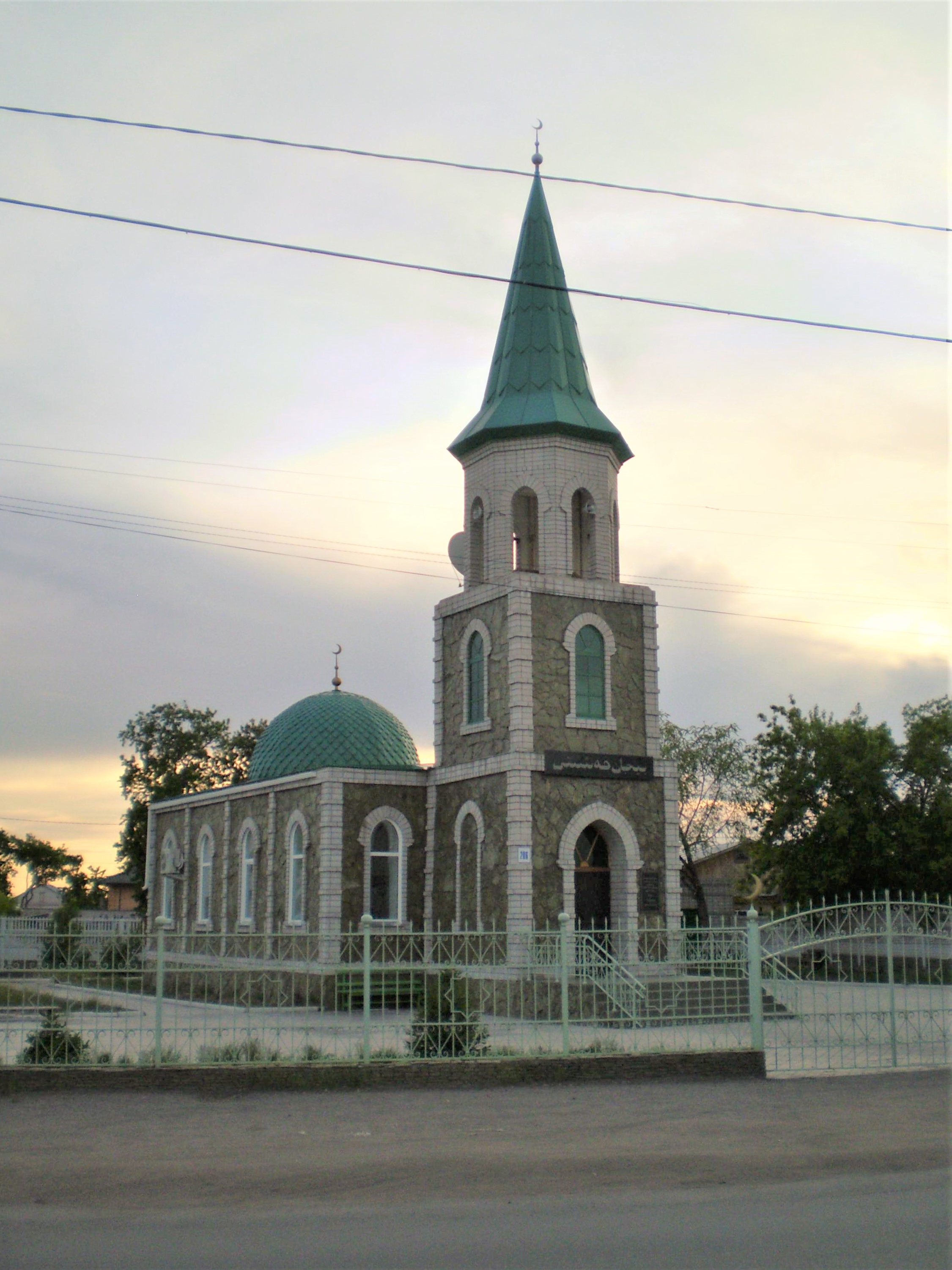
Old city mosque (Kaz. Jóndelgen Pavlodardyń eski meshiti)

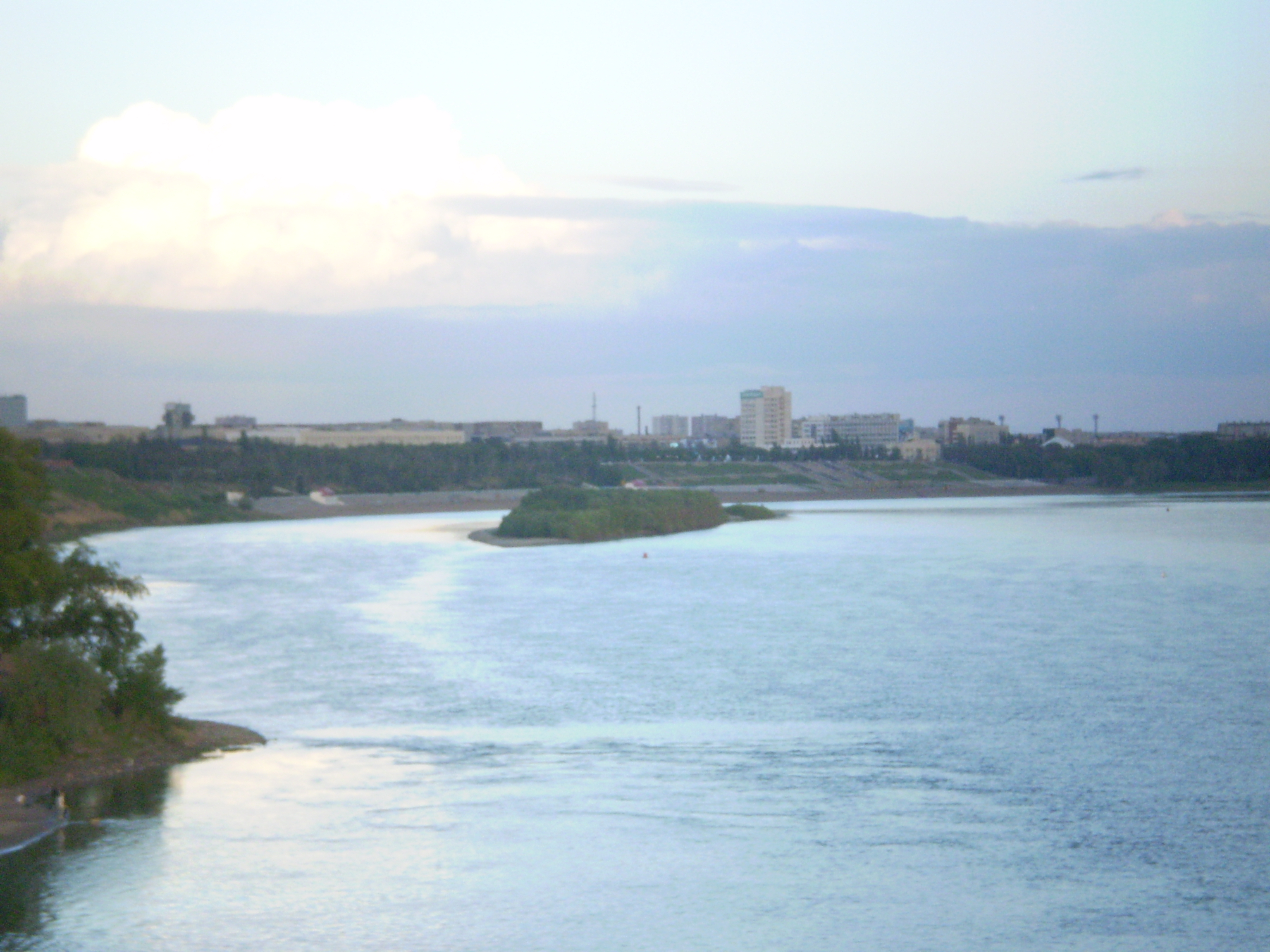
Irtysh river view

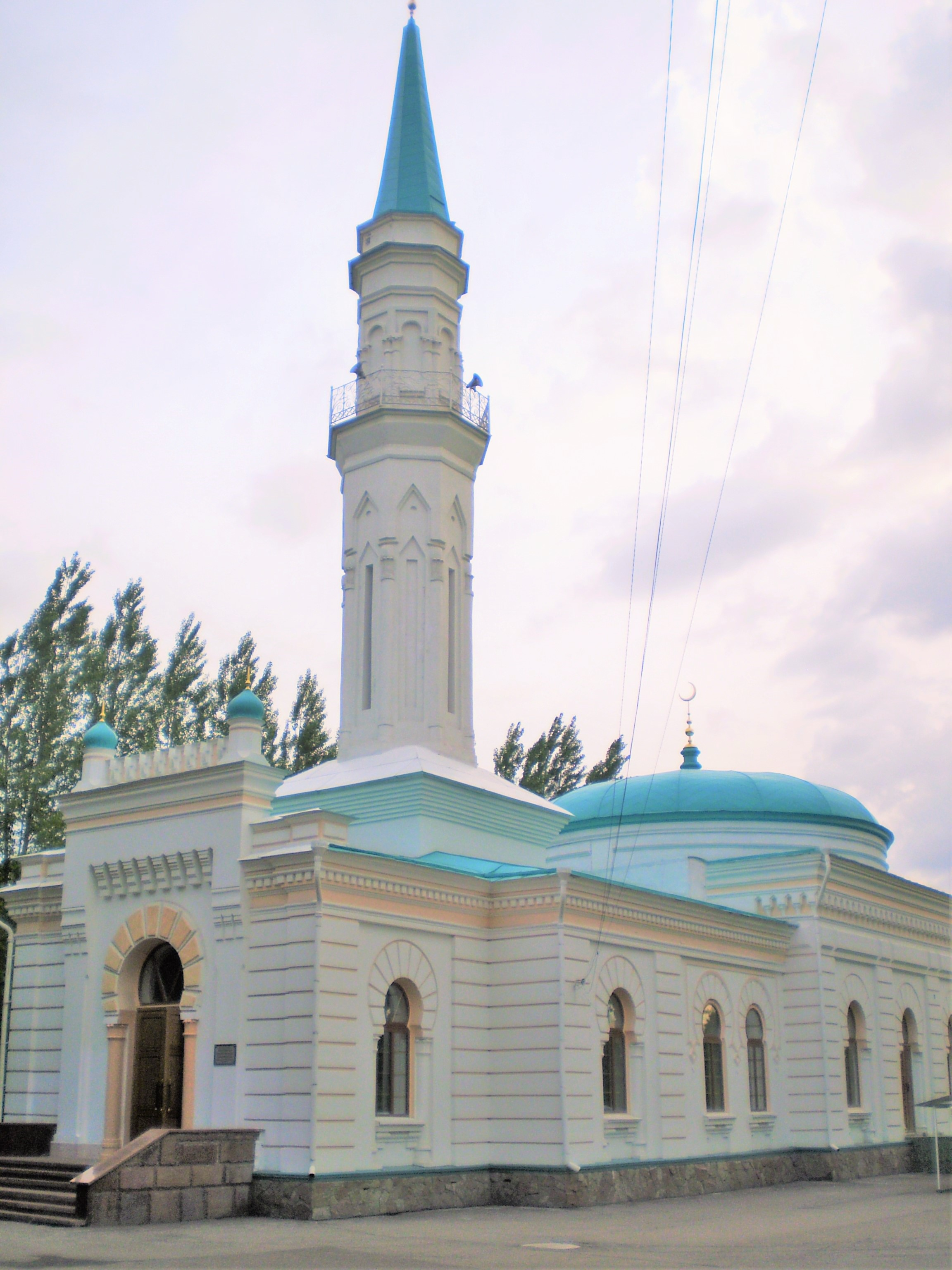
Abdulfattah Ramazanov mosque

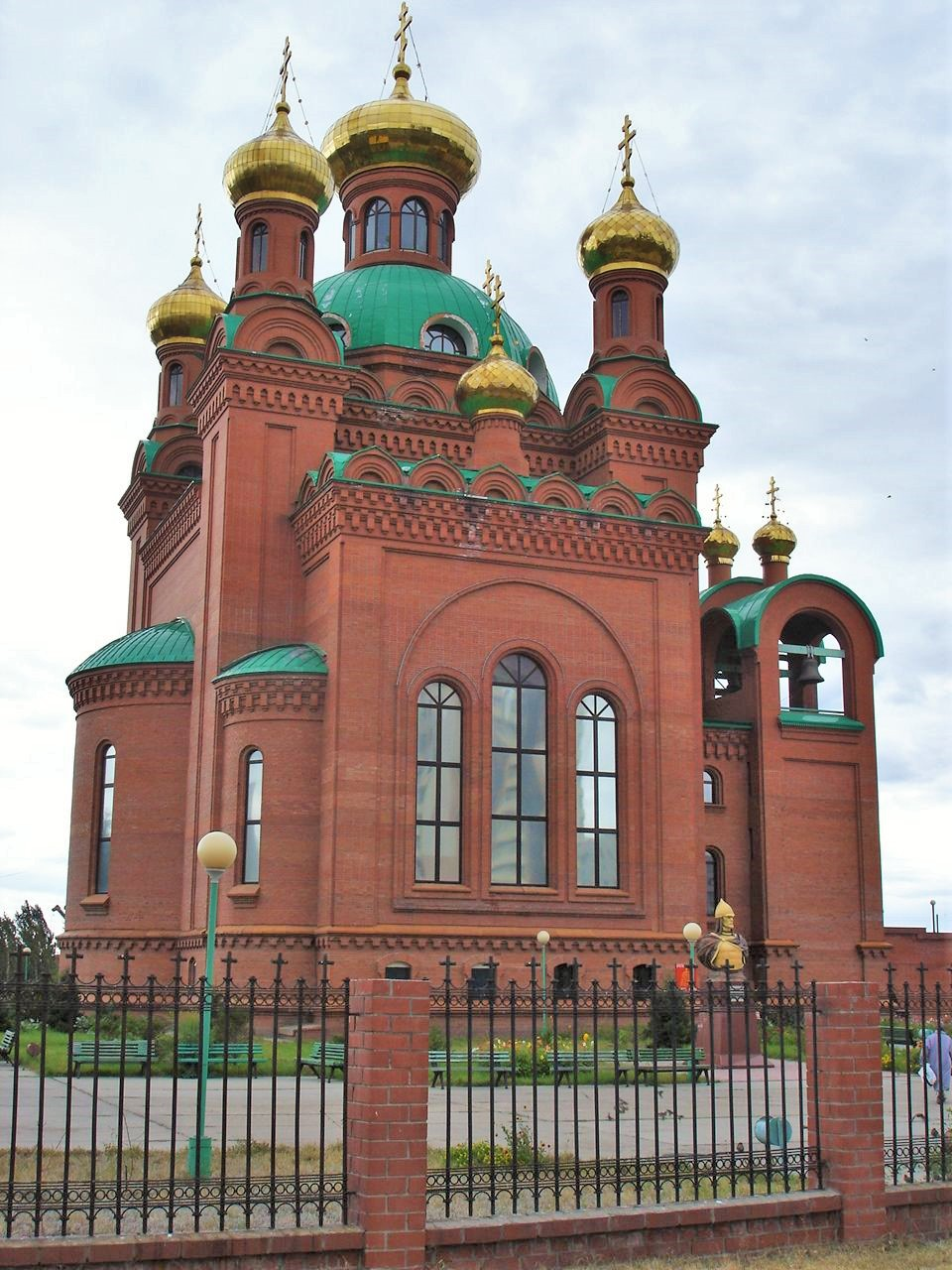
Blagoveschensky cathedral (Russian Orthodox Church)

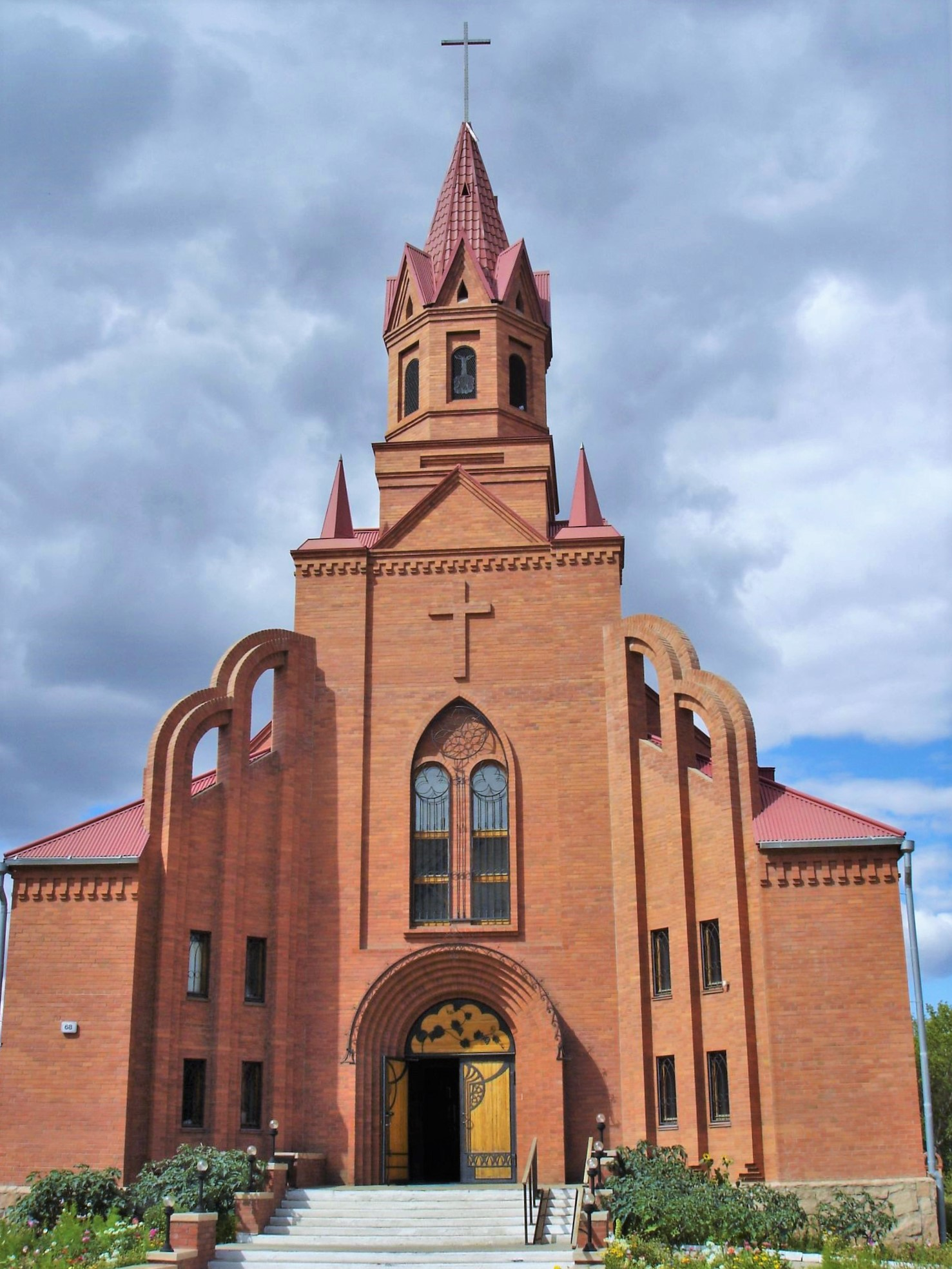
Catholic church of Saint Thereza
