= S. Toraighyrov Pavlodar Regional Universal Scientific Library =

Library in Kazakhstan

- Областная универсальная научная библиотека имени С. Торайгырова с.торайғыров атындағы облыстық кітапана
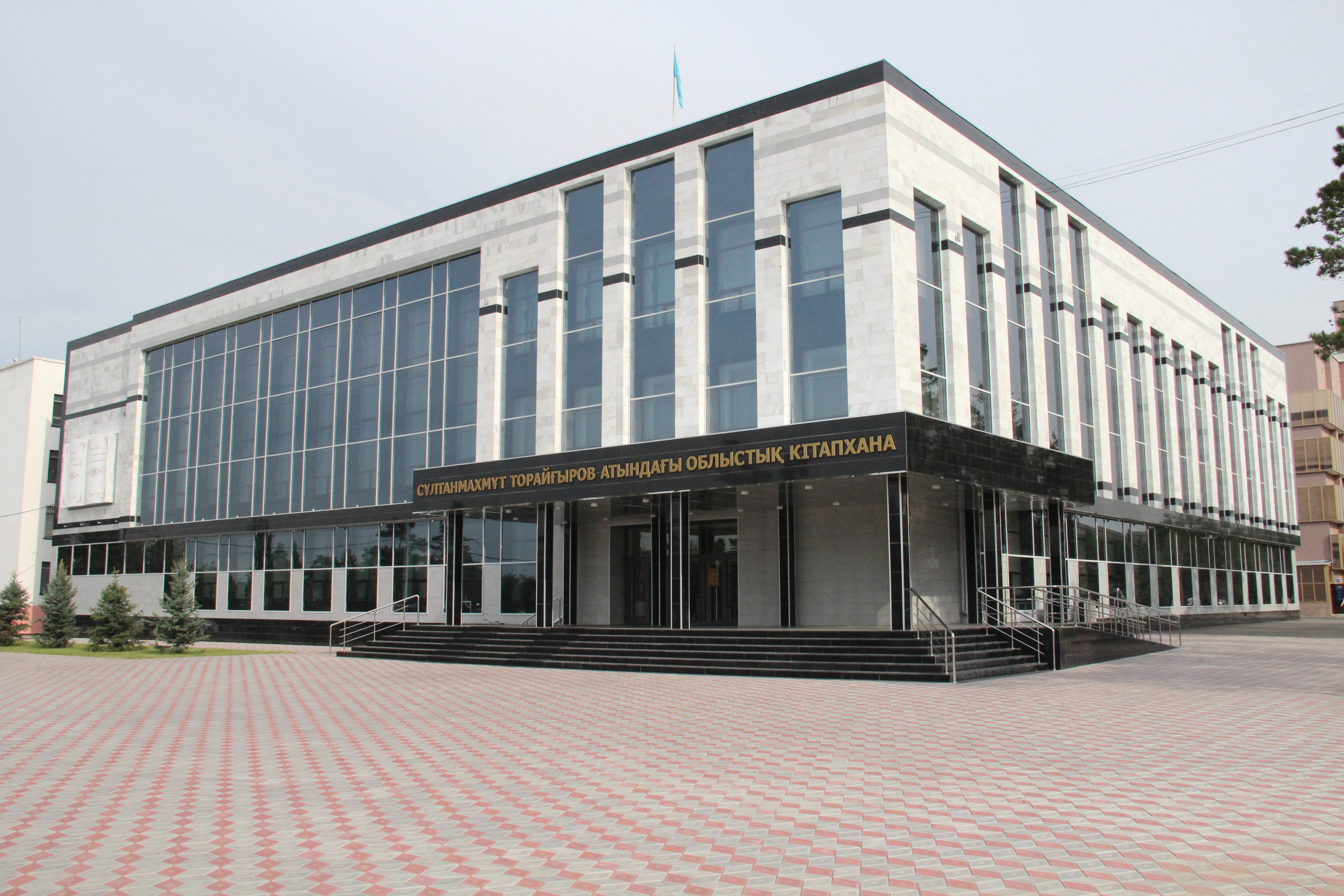
- Pavlodar Regional Library main entrance
- 52.286962°N 76.940896°E
- Location: 104 Akademika Satpayev Str., Pavlodar, Kazakhstan
- Type: Regional Universal Academic Library
- Established: 1896
- Service area: Pavlodar Region

Access and use
- Members: 55

Other information
- Director: Shahmetova Sholpan Bayanovna
- Website: http://pavlodarlibrary.kz/en/

The S. Toraighyrov Pavlodar Regional Universal Scientific Library is a library located in Pavlodar, Kazakhstan. It was established as a district library in 1896, evolving from a city library established a few years prior, growing in status through various political changes in Kazakhstan. With the formation of the Pavlodar Region in 1938, the library was granted the status of a regional library.

In 1959, the library was named after Soviet writer Nikolay Ostrovsky. In 1996, as the library celebrated its centenary, it was renamed after the Kazakh writer Sultanmahmut Toraygirov, and consolidated its collections in multiple separate buildings into a single building at a new location.

== History ==
In 1892, the Pavlodar municipal council established a city library and reading room, initially in a private home. Donations from merchant Artemy Ivanovich Derov and other patrons of the city raised funds for the library's maintenance.

By 1896, it had become a Uyezd ('District') Library, which is usually taken to be the year the library was founded. By that time the library had accrued 5475 books and magazines. In 1920, after the adoption of a RSFSR decree to centralize library work, the library was transferred to central funding which allowed it to increase its collections and equip 10 mobile libraries throughout the region, which were used to help combat illiteracy.

In 1938, after the formation of the Pavlodar Region, the library received the status of Oblastnoi ('Regional') library.

In 1951, the regional library was able to interloan with the Moscow-based Lenin Library, as policies were developed to support regional and city libraries. In 1959 the library changed its name, and was named after the famous Soviet writer Nikolay Ostrovsky. In 1988, by the order of the Ministry of Culture of KSSR, the Pavlodar Regional Universal Library, Youth Library and Children's Library united to become the largest in the region, the Regional United Universal Scientific Library.

=== Centenary ===
Until 1996, the regional library was located in five buildings scattered around the city, and not enough places for a single reading room. The books were stored in the book depository, which hindered the day-to-day functioning of the library. As part of the celebration of its 100th anniversary, the library was moved to the site of the current building, located at the corner of the intersection of Satpayev and Kairbayev streets, near the akimat of Pavlodar. The regional library was also renamed after the Kazakh poet, Sultanmahmut Toraygirov.

== See also ==
- List of libraries in Kazakhstan
