= National Library of Kazakhstan =

National library in Almaty, Kazakhstan

National Library of the Republic of Kazakhstan
- Kazakh: Қазақстан Республикасының Ұлттық кітапханасы Russian: Национальная Библиотека Республики Казахстан
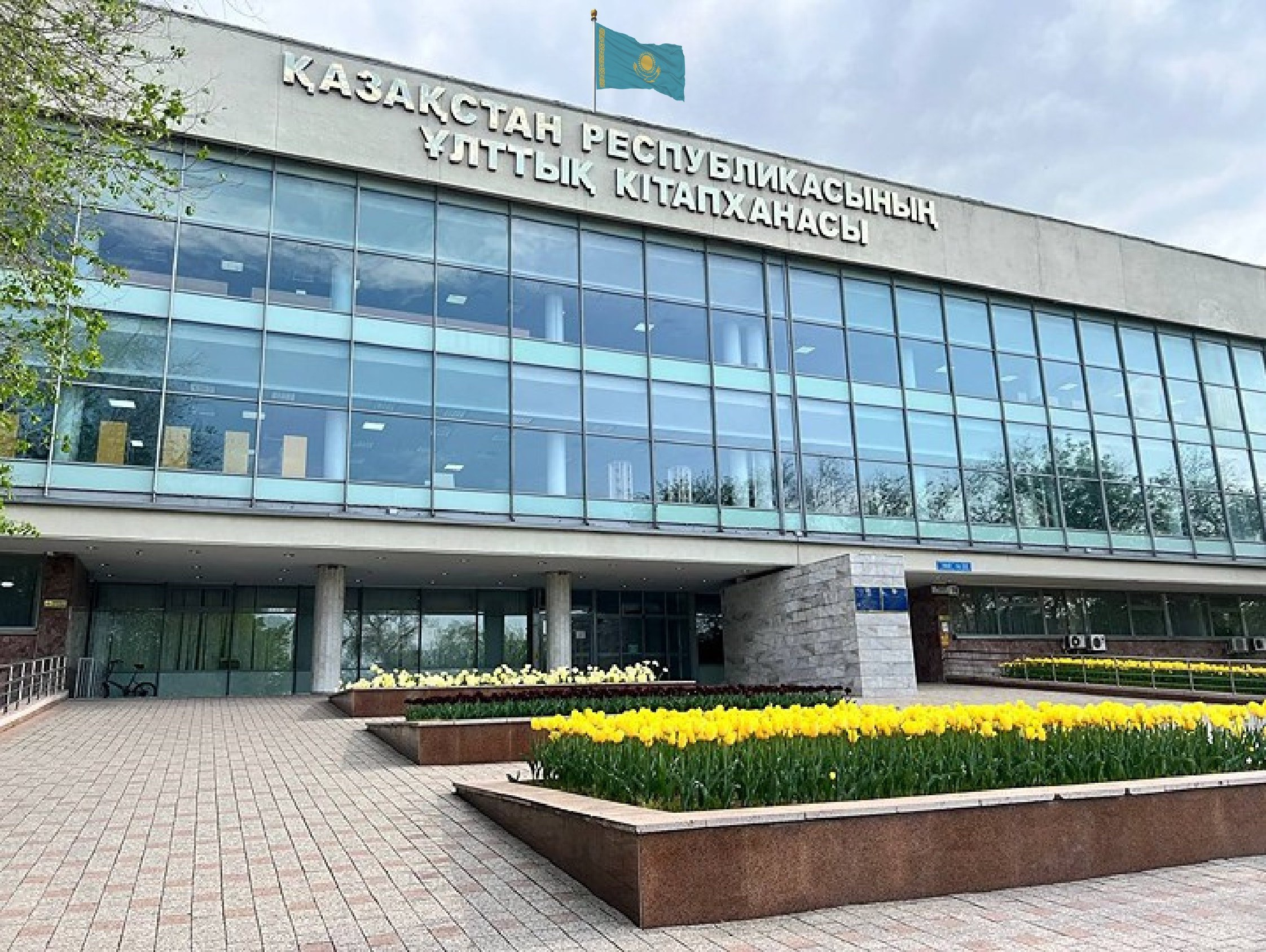
- 43°14′29″N 76°56′35″E
- Location: Almaty, Kazakhstan
- Established: 1910 (116 years ago)

Other information
- Director: Nurgalieva Gaziza Kudaibergenovna
- Website: www.nlrk.kz

The National Library of the Republic of Kazakhstan (kaz. Kazakhstan Republikasyn Ulttyk kitapkhanasy) is the national book depository of Kazakhstan, located in the city of Almaty.

== History ==
In 1910, the Vernenskaya City Library named after Leo Tolstoy was founded. In 1920, the Semirechensk Regional Public Library was organized on its basis, which was later renamed the Alma Ata Provincial and then the district library.

In 1931, by the decree of the Presidium of the Central Executive Committee of the Councils of the Kazakh SSR dated March 12, 1931 "On the establishment of the State Public Library of the Kazakh SSR", the library was transformed into the State Public Library of the Kazakh SSR. The library was named after Alexander Pushkin as a sign of perpetuation of the memory of the great Russian poet and in connection with the 100th anniversary of his death in February 1937.

Soon, the library became the largest in the region, the national book depository, the coordinating center for scientific, methodological and research work in the field of library science and the history of the Kazakh book, and the publication of the national bibliography. The Pushkin Library became the largest book depository in Kazakhstan, which received copies of newspapers, magazines, and other government printed publications and books from all over the Soviet Union. The functions of the library staff also included scientific work: correspondence with the largest libraries in the world, archival research, publication of works on librarianship. The library served as the republican branch body of scientific information on culture and art. The book collection, which in 1931 amounted to only 64 thousand printed publications, had grown to more than 4 million by 1982. The number of readers increased from 9,000 to 55,000 from 1940 to 1982.

On December 9, 1991, by a decree of the Cabinet of Ministers of the Kazakh SSR, the Pushkin State Library of the Kazakh SSR was renamed the National Library of the Kazakh SSR, then, after the renaming of the Kazakh SSR to the Republic of Kazakhstan, to the National Library of the Republic of Kazakhstan, and thus acquired state and public significance as a particularly valuable cultural object.

The National Library of the Republic of Kazakhstan has been a member of the International Federation of Library Associations and Institutions (IFLA), the Conference of Directors of National Libraries (CDNL) since 1992, and the Library Assembly of Eurasia (BAE) Non—profit Partnership since 1993. Since 2008, he has been the regional center of the IFLA/PAC Core Program (Conservation and Conservation).

== Management ==
1. Uraz Dzhandosov (1931-1932)
2. Baten Zhumabaev (1933-1937)
3. Mukhtar Zhangalin (1938-1942)
4. Elena Shmeleva (1942-1963)
5. Nazira Dauletova (1963-1987)
6. Rosa Berdigalieva (1987-2003)
7. Murat Auezov (2003-2007)
8. Orynbasar Isakhov (2007-2011)
9. Gulisa Balabekova (2011-2014)
10. Alibek Askar (2014-2016)
11. Zhanat Seidumanov (2016-2019)
12. Bakytzhamal Ospanova (2019-2025)
13. Gaziza Nurgalieva (from 2025)

The National Library is currently the largest scientific and methodological center of libraries in Kazakhstan; the depository of the obligatory copy of the works of the press of Kazakhstan; the depository of the Committee for Control in the field of Education and Science of the Ministry of Education and Science of the Republic of Kazakhstan for candidate and doctoral dissertations in all branches of knowledge defended in Kazakhstan; the depository of abstracts of the CIS countries; since 1993 — the depository of scientific dissertations and publications of UNESCO, since 2005 — the depository of literature published under the State Program "Cultural Heritage"; Since 2012, he has been the depository of publications of the Assembly of People of Kazakhstan in Almaty.

In 2020, according to the decree of the President of the Republic of Kazakhstan Kassym-Jomart Tokayev "On awarding the status of "National" to certain cultural organizations,"from November 20, 2020, the National Library of the Republic of Kazakhstan was awarded the status of "National". At the moment, the book collection of the National Library of the Republic of Kazakhstan has over 7 million books. The annual attendance of readers is over 1 million people, book distribution is about 2 million.

In 2020, the Abai Literary Center was opened in the library on the occasion of the 175th anniversary of the famous Kazakh poet and educator Abai Kunanbayev, where loud readings of Abai's poems, literature reviews, and various events are held. Also, in order to facilitate the familiarization and in-depth study of the thinker's scientific works and events, the al-Farabi Scientific Center was opened in the library, dedicated to the 1150th anniversary of the great philosopher and thinker. The Center is a permanent open-access exhibition of al-Farabi's works and publications about him.

== Building ==
The building housing the National Library of the Republic of Kazakhstan was built in 1970 according to the project of the Kazgorstroyproekt Institute (architects V. P. Ishchenko, K. N. Kalnoy, V. N. Kim, E. Kuznetsov, engineers V. Angelsky, A. Deev, G. Stulov).

The library is a three-storey building with two courtyards that serve as light wells. The main book depository, utility rooms and utility rooms are located in the basement. The northern building houses administrative buildings, while the southern building has been given over to reading rooms. The supporting structures of the building are prefabricated monolithic reinforced concrete frames, the floors are made of ribbed reinforced concrete slabs, the walls are reinforced cement, lightweight construction with insulation made of mineral wool slabs.

The ramp leading to the central entrance lifts the building above its surroundings, emphasizing its monumentality. The strict, concise solution of the facades contributes to the simplicity and clarity of the architectural and planning solution, which is based on the principle of open-plan reading rooms. The conditions of deep silence and comfort in the library are provided by acoustic silence techniques.

The library has 14 specialized halls with a capacity of 1,500 seats.

In 1982, the library building was included in the List of Historical and Cultural Monuments of the Kazakh SSR of national significance and taken under state protection.

== See also ==
- List of libraries in Kazakhstan
