= Copyright law of Kazakhstan =

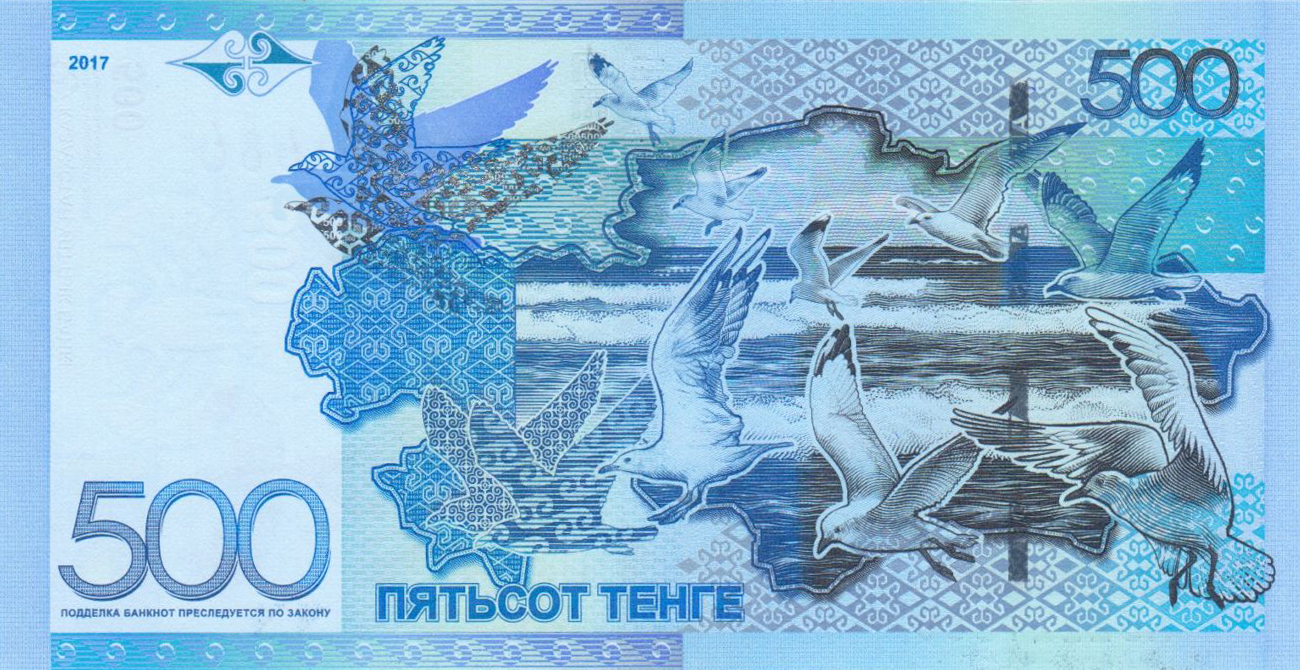
Reverse of a 500 KZT banknote, which belongs to a class of works not normally protected by the copyright law of Kazakhstan (Note: Two of the birds depicted on the note appear to be based on photos taken by Marcel Burkhard and Kate Tester, and may have been copied without permission. As it is unclear whether or not the banknote, a derivative work, can normally be reproduced without credit, this footnote provides the proper credit here.)

In Kazakhstan, the laws on copyright offer protection for the holders of certain intellectual property rights based on the creation of a work.

== Overview ==
The current laws are based on a law first adopted by Kazakhstan in 1996, and last amended in 2015. (Note: The 2015 amendment did not enter into force until 2016.) The laws largely follow the standards of the Berne Convention and the World Intellectual Property Organization (WIPO).

In general, works that are eligible for protection have a copyright term that ends 70 years after the death of the author.

== Enforcement ==
There are no specialized intellectual property courts in Kazakhstan. Civil cases are brought up in ordinary civil courts. Cases dealing with administrative or criminal matters are addressed in administrative or criminal courts.

== International treaties ==
The Berne Convention entered into force in Kazakhstan on 12 April 1999. The WIPO Copyright Treaty entered into force on 12 November 2004.

== Notes ==
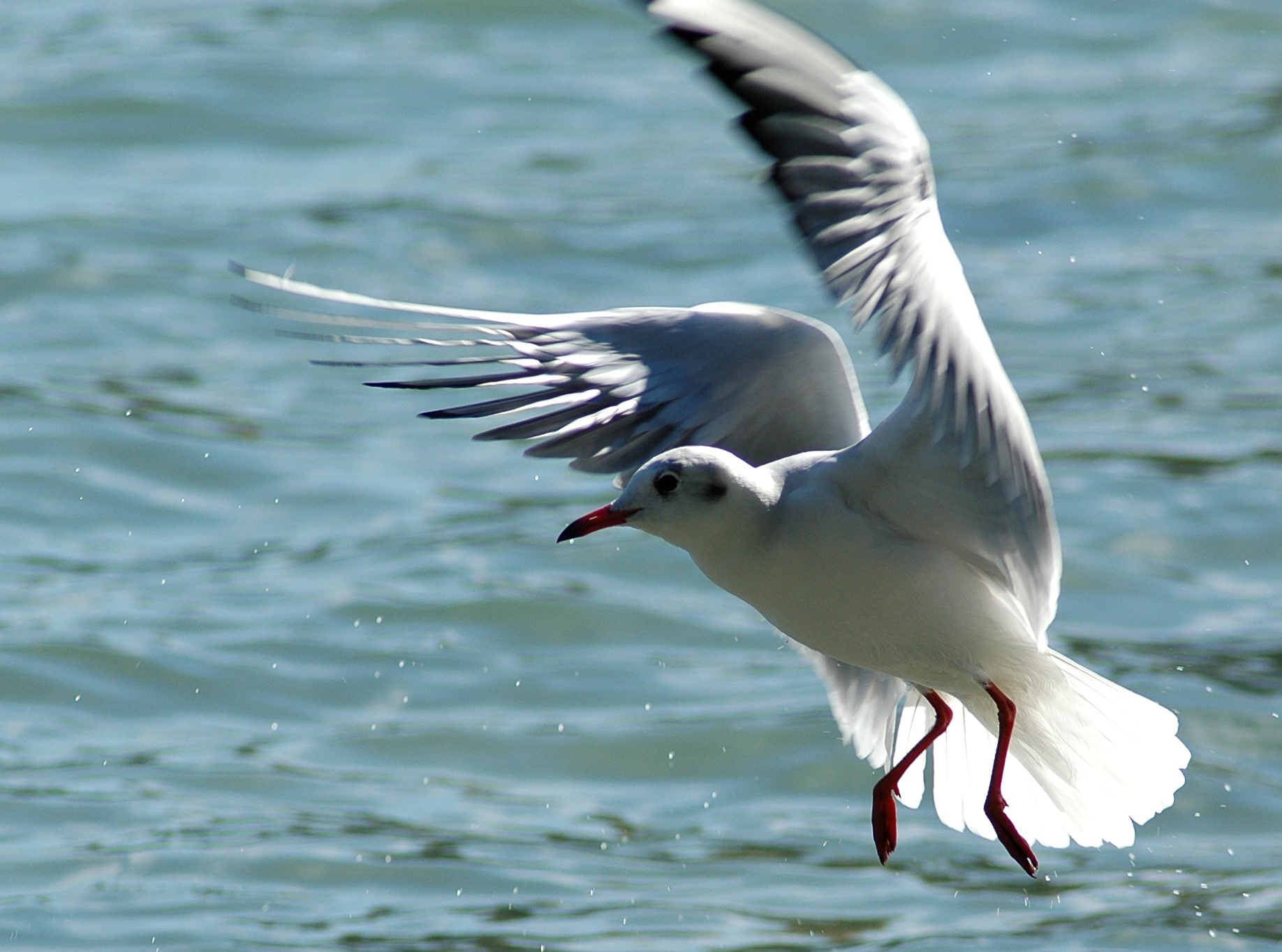
Marcel Burkhard's photo
